= Raghogarh Assembly constituency =

Constituency of the Madhya Pradesh legislative assembly in India

Coordinates: 22.71°N 76.18°E

Raghogarh
- Constituency No. 31 for the Madhya Pradesh Legislative Assembly

Constituency details
- Country: India
- Region: Central India
- State: Madhya Pradesh
- District: Guna
- Lok Sabha constituency: Rajgarh
- Established: 1951
- Reservation: None

Member of Legislative Assembly
- 16th Madhya Pradesh Legislative Assembly
- Incumbent Jaivardhan Singh
- Party: Indian National Congress
- Elected year: 2023
- Preceded by: Mool Singh

Raghogarh Assembly constituency is one of the 230 Vidhan Sabha (Legislative Assembly) constituencies of Madhya Pradesh state in central India. This constituency came into existence in 1951, as one of the 79 Vidhan Sabha constituencies of the erstwhile Madhya Bharat state.

== Overview ==
Raghogarh (constituency number 31) is one of the four Vidhan Sabha constituencies located in Guna district. This constituency covers parts of Raghogarh and Aron tehsils.

Raghogarh is part of Rajgarh Lok Sabha constituency along with seven other Vidhan Sabha segments, namely, Chachoura in this district, Narsinghgarh, Biaora, Rajgarh, Khilchipur and Sarangpur in Rajgarh district and Susner in Agar Malwa district.

It has frequently been held by members of one family. In June 2013, Mool Singh, a cousin of Digvijay Singh, announced that he would be stepping down from the seat at the next elections, paving the way for Digvijay's son, Jaivardhan, to be elected in a form of dynastic succession that is common. Mool Singh had suffered a stroke three years previously and gave poor health as the reason for his decision. The constituency has previously been held by Digvijay, his brother Lakshman Singh and by their father, Balbhadra Singh. It was noted in 2003 that the seat has been held by members of the family or their anointed candidates since 1977 and that the main opposition party, the Bharatiya Janata Party, had lost its election deposit on all but one occasion in the subsequent five elections up to that date. The candidates who had stood against the family candidate in the first elections from the constituency in 1952 had also lost their deposits.

== Members of the Legislative Assembly ==
=== As a constituency of Madhya Bharat ===
Election	Name	Party
1952	Balbhadra Singh	Independent

=== As a constituency of Madhya Pradesh ===
Election	Member	Party
1962	Dulichand	Indian National Congress
1967	P. Lalaram	Swatantra Party
1972	Harlal Shakyawar	Bharatiya Jana Sangh
1977	Digvijay Singh	Indian National Congress
1980	Digvijay Singh	Indian National Congress
1985	Mool Singh	Indian National Congress
1990	Lakshman Singh	Indian National Congress
1993	Lakshman Singh	Indian National Congress
1998	Digvijay Singh	Indian National Congress
2003	Digvijay Singh	Indian National Congress
2008	Mool Singh	Indian National Congress
2013	Jaivardhan Singh	Indian National Congress
2018	Jaivardhan Singh	Indian National Congress
2023	Jaivardhan Singh	Indian National Congress

== Election results ==
=== 2023 ===
2023 Madhya Pradesh Legislative Assembly election: Raghogarh
Party	Candidate	Votes	%	±%
INC	Jaivardhan Singh	95,738	48.58	−13.06
BJP	Hirendra Singh Banti Banna	91,233	46.3	+13.95
ASP(KR)	Sanjeev Ahirwar	2,451	1.24	
BSP	Dharmendra Gajramsingh Yadav	2,311	1.17	−1.11
NOTA	None of the above	2,113	1.07	−0.61
Majority		4,505	2.28	−27.01
Turnout		197,068	83.41	+6.29
INC hold		Swing		

=== 2018 ===
2018 Madhya Pradesh Legislative Assembly election: Raghogarh
Party	Candidate	Votes	%	±%
INC	Jaivardhan Singh	98,268	61.64	
BJP	Bhupendra Singh Raghuwanshi	51,571	32.35	
BSP	Banwari Lal Ahirwar	3,630	2.28	
NOTA	None of the above	2,683	1.68	
Majority		46,697	29.29	
Turnout		159,428	77.12	
INC hold		Swing		

=== 2013 ===
2013 Madhya Pradesh Legislative Assembly election: Raghogarh
Party	Candidate	Votes	%	±%
INC	Jaivardhan Singh	98,041	66.02	
BJP	Radhe Shyam Dhakad	39,837	26.83	
BSP	Rajesh Singh Dhakad	3632	2.45	
Independent	Brahmanand Lodha	1000	0.67	
Independent	Radheshyam Dhakad	841	0.57	N/A
Independent	Ashok Kumar Paliya	423	0.33	N/A
SP	Jagdish Sharma	777	0.52	N/A
Independent	Radheshyam Dhakad	590	0.40	
Independent	Rajesh Ahirwar	375	0.25	
Independent	Bablesh Prajapati	285	0.19	
Independent	Pappu Khatik	285	0.19	
LJP	Jitendra Valmeek	217	0.15	N/A
NOTA	None of the Above	2587	1.74	
Majority		58,204		
Turnout		148503	76.54	
INC hold		Swing		

== See also ==
- Raghogarh-Vijaypur
- Madhya Pradesh Vidhan Sabha
