= Raghunandan =

Raghunandan (literally, "son of Raghu") is a name of Rama, the legendary king of Ayodhya in India. Rama, who is considered to be an incarnation of Vishnu, was a descendant of the king Raghu.

Raghunandan may also refer to:

- Raghunandana (c.16th CE), a Sanskrit scholar from Bengal
- Raghunandan Lal Bhatia (1920–2021), Indian politician from Punjab; Governor of Bihar
- Raghunandan Swarup Pathak (1924–2007), 18th Chief Justice of India
- Raghunandan Sharma (Mandsaur) (born 1946), Indian politician from Madhya Pradesh
- Raghunandan Sharma (Rajgarh) (born 1950), Indian politician from Madhya Pradesh
- Raghu Nandan Mandal (1952–2016), Indian politician from Bihar
- Raghunandan Singh Bhadauria (born 1962), Indian politician from Uttar Pradesh
- Raghunandan Panshikar (born 1963), Indian classical vocalist
- Raghunandan Rao (born 1968), Indian politician from Telangana
- Raghunandan Yandamuri (born 1986), Indian murder and kidnapper incarcerated in the United States
- N. R. Raghunanthan (born 1980), Indian film score composer

== See also ==
- Raghunandan Sharma (disambiguation)
