= Rajgarh =

Rajgarh may refer to these places in India:

== Jammu and Kashmir ==
- Rajgarh, Jammu and Kashmir, town and tehsil capital

== Himachal Pradesh ==
- Rajgarh, Himachal Pradesh, town

== Madhya Pradesh ==
- Rajgarh, Madhya Pradesh, city and capital of the district and the former princely state
  - Rajgarh State, a former princely state
  - Rajgarh district
  - Rajgarh (Lok Sabha constituency)
  - Rajgarh (Vidhan Sabha constituency)
- Rajgarh, Dhar, a town in Dhar district

== Rajasthan ==
- Rajgarh, Rajasthan (also known as Sadulpur), a town and tehsil capital in Churu district
  - Rajgarh (Rajasthan Assembly constituency), defunct
- Rajgarh, Alwar, a town in Alwar district
  - Rajgarh railway station
- Rajgarh, Kota, a village in Kota district
