= Raghunandan Sharma =

Raghunandan Sharma is the name of:

- Raghunandan Sharma (Rajgarh), former BJP MLA from Rajgarh, Madhya Pradesh
- Raghunandan Sharma (Mandsaur) (born 1946), BJP MP, currently in the Rajya Sabha from Madhya Pradesh
