= Rajgarh Lok Sabha constituency =

Lok Sabha Constituency in Madhya Pradesh, India

Coordinates: 24°15′N 74°56′E

Rajgarh
- Lok Sabha constituency
- Interactive Map Outlining Rajgarh Lok Sabha constituency

Constituency details
- Country: India
- Region: Central India
- State: Madhya Pradesh
- Assembly constituencies: Chachoura; Raghogarh; Narsinghgarh; Biaora; Rajgarh; Khilchipur; Sarangpur; Susner
- Established: 1962
- Total electors: 18,75,211
- Reservation: None

Member of Parliament
- 18th Lok Sabha
- Incumbent Rodmal Nagar
- Party: Bharatiya Janata Party
- Elected year: 2024

Rajgarh Lok Sabha constituency is one of the 29 Lok Sabha constituencies in the Indian state of Madhya Pradesh. This constituency covers the entire Rajgarh district and parts of Guna and Agar Malwa districts.

== Assembly segments ==
Rajgarh Lok Sabha constituency presently comprises the following eight Vidhan Sabha segments:

#	Name	District	Member	Party	2024 Lead
30	Chachoura	Guna	Priyanka Penchi	BJP	BJP
31	Raghogarh	Guna	Jaivardhan Singh	INC	INC
160	Narsinghgarh	Rajgarh	Mohan Sharma	BJP	BJP
161	Biaora	Rajgarh	Narayan Singh Pawar	BJP	BJP
162	Rajgarh	Rajgarh	Amar Singh Yadav	BJP	BJP
163	Khilchipur	Rajgarh	Hajarilal Dangi	BJP	BJP
164	Sarangpur (SC)	Rajgarh	Gotam Tetwal	BJP	BJP
165	Susner	Agar Malwa	Bhairon Singh Bapu	INC	BJP

== Members of Parliament ==
Year	Member	Party
1952 (Note: Shajapur-Rajgarh Lok Sabha)	Liladhar Joshi	Indian National Congress
1952	Bhagu Nandu Malvia	Indian National Congress
1957 (Note: Shajapur Lok Sabha)	Liladhar Joshi	Indian National Congress
1957	Kanhaiyalal	Indian National Congress
1962	Bhanu Prakash Singh	Independent
1967	Baburao Patel	Bharatiya Jana Sangh
1971	Jagannathrao Joshi	Bharatiya Jana Sangh
1977	Vasant Kumar Pandit	Janata Party
1980	Vasant Kumar Pandit	Janata Party
1984	Digvijaya Singh	Indian National Congress
1989	Pyarelal Khandelwal	Bharatiya Janata Party
1991	Digvijaya Singh	Indian National Congress
1994^	Lakshman Singh	Indian National Congress
1996	Lakshman Singh	Indian National Congress
1998	Lakshman Singh	Indian National Congress
1999	Lakshman Singh	Indian National Congress
2004	Lakshman Singh	Bharatiya Janata Party
2009	Narayan Singh	Indian National Congress
2014	Rodmal Nagar	Bharatiya Janata Party
2019	Rodmal Nagar	Bharatiya Janata Party
2024	Rodmal Nagar	Bharatiya Janata Party

== Election results ==
=== 2024 ===
2024 Indian general election: Rajgarh
Party	Candidate	Votes	%	±%
BJP	Rodmal Nagar	758,743	53.10	▼12.27
INC	Digvijaya Singh	6,12,654	42.87	▲11.70
NOTA	None of the above	7,260	0.51	▼0.31
Majority		1,46,089	10.23	▼23.96
Turnout		14,28,997	76.04	▲1.62
BJP hold		Swing	▼12.27	

=== 2019 ===
2019 Indian general elections: Rajgarh
Party	Candidate	Votes	%	±%
BJP	Rodmal Nagar	823,824	65.37	+6.33
INC	Smt. Mona Sustani	3,92,805	31.17	−5.24
NOTA	None of the above	10,375	0.82	−0.20
SSMP	Th. Jagdish Singh Parmar	9,396	0.75	new
Majority		4,31,019	34.19	+11.56
Turnout		12,60,930	74.42	+0.39
BJP hold		Swing		

=== 2014 ===
2014 Indian general elections: Rajgarh
Party	Candidate	Votes	%	±%
BJP	Rodmal Nagar	596,727	59.04	+13.69
INC	Narayan Singh Amlabe	3,67,990	36.41	−12.69
BSP	Dr. Shivnarayan Verma	13,864	1.37	new
NOTA	None of the above	10,292	1.02	N/A
Majority		2,28,737	22.63	+18.88
Turnout		10,10,811	64.03	+12.46
BJP gain from INC		Swing		

=== 2009 ===
2009 Indian general elections: Rajgarh
Party	Candidate	Votes	%	±%
INC	Narayan Singh Amlabe	319,371	49.10	N/A
BJP	Lakshman Singh	2,94,983	45.35	N/A
Independent	Laxmansingh Aamdor	11,311	1.74	N/A
Majority		24,388	3.75	N/A
Turnout		6,50,344	51.57	N/A
INC gain from BJP		Swing		

=== 1998 Lok Sabha ===
- Lakshman Singh (Congress),
- Kailash Joshi (BJP)

=== 1980 Lok Sabha ===
- Pandit, Vasantkumar Ramakrishna (JNP) : 161,299 votes
- Mangilal Bhandari (INC-I) : 128,320

== See also ==
- Rajgarh, Madhya Pradesh
- Rajgarh district
- Raigarh, a city formerly in MP, and now in Chhattisgarh State in India
- Raigarh district
- List of constituencies of the Lok Sabha
