= Vasant Kumar Pandit =

Indian politician

Member of Parliament
- Preceded by: Jagannath Rao Joshi
- Succeeded by: Digvijaya Singh
- Constituency: Rajgarh

Personal details
- Born: 25 September 1921 Bombay, India
- Died: 5 June 1987 (aged 66) Bombay, India
- Party: Bharatiya Jan Sangh; Janata Party
- Spouse: Shushila Pandit
- Children: 3

Vasant Kumar Pandit (1921–1987) was an Indian politician belonging to the Bharatiya Jana Sangh party from Mumbai. Later he was part of Janata Party and Bharatiya Janata Party.

He was born on 5 June 1921 to Ramkrishna Pandit. He died on 25 September 1987. Famous classical singer Pandit Jasraj was his cousin. He was a professor of Sanskrit at Wilson College in Mumbai and an Astrologer. While he was from Maharashtra and represented Jana Sangh in Maharashtra Vidhan Parishad as a member, he contested 6th & 7th Lok Sabha elections from Madhya Pradesh in BJP strongholds in 1970's. He joined Jaya Prakash Narayan in his Sampoorna Kranti Movement.

A scholarly person, he was associated with Bhandarkar Oriental Research Institute in Pune, Bharatiya Sangeet Samsad, Indo-Israel League for 10 years, and Prince of Wales Museum for 3 years, among his many social activities.

He took the oath of membership of Lok Sabha in Sanskrit language. As for his association with astrology, BJP leader L. K. Advani has recounted how Pandit accurately predicted a period in the wilderness for his party in 1975-76 just when things were actually looking promising for them.

Dr. Pandit, a renowned professional astrologer said, 'At least my reading of astrology says we are heading for a two-year exile!'.

He was one of the Bharatiya Janata Party's executive members. "Dr Pandit was a member of the Maharashtra legislative council for 18 years and a member of the Lok Sabha from 1977 to 1984 from Madhya Pradesh"

== Organizational Positions ==
Secretary, Bharatiya Jan Sangh; Bombay Unit 1953–1966;
President, Bharatiya Jan Sangh, Bombay Unit, 1957–1966,
President, Maharashtra State Jan Sangh, 1969–1977;

== Elected Positions ==
He was elected to Lok Sabha from Rajgarh in Madhya Pradesh in 1977 on Janata Party's ticket. He won re-election from there in 1980. He joined Bharatiya Janata Party in April 1980 when Janata party split.
