= Mool Singh =

Indian politician

Mool Singh Chouhan Ex-MLA

Member of the Madhya Pradesh Legislative Assembly
- In office 1985–1990
- Preceded by: Digvijaya Singh
- Succeeded by: Lakshman Singh
- Constituency: Raghogarh
- In office 2008–2013
- Preceded by: Digvijaya Singh
- Succeeded by: Jaivardhan Singh

Personal details
- Born: 15 August 1947
- Died: 17 August 2016 (aged 69)
- Party: Indian National Congress
- Profession: Politician

Mool Singh Chouhan Peelaghata (also spelled Mul Singh, 15 August 1947 – 17 August 2016) was an Indian politician who was elected as a member of legislative assembly on Indian National Congress party symbol to the Madhya Pradesh Vidhan Sabha in 1985 and 2008 from the Raghogarh constituency.

== Political career ==
He also served as a zila panchayat head of Guna district in 2001. He was a cousin of Digvijay Singh, a former Chief Minister of Madhya Pradesh and thus related to politician Lakshman Singh, Digvijay's brother. He was resident of Peelaghata village situated in same constituency.

In June 2013, Singh announced that he would be stepping down from the seat at the next elections, paving way for Digvijay Singh's son, Jaivardhan Singh. Mool Singh cited poor health for his decision. The constituency has previously been held by Digvijay, Lakshman and by their father, Balbhadra Singh.

== Personal life ==
Mool Singh died on 17 August 2016, aged 69, after suffering a cardiac arrest at the Delhi railway station. He was admitted in a private hospital in Delhi and was returning to his home when he suffered from the heart attack at the station and died. He is survived by wife, two sons and a daughter.
