= Nexus Treasure Island Mall, Indore =

Nexus Treasure Island Mall
- नेक्सस ट्रेज़र आइलैंड मॉल
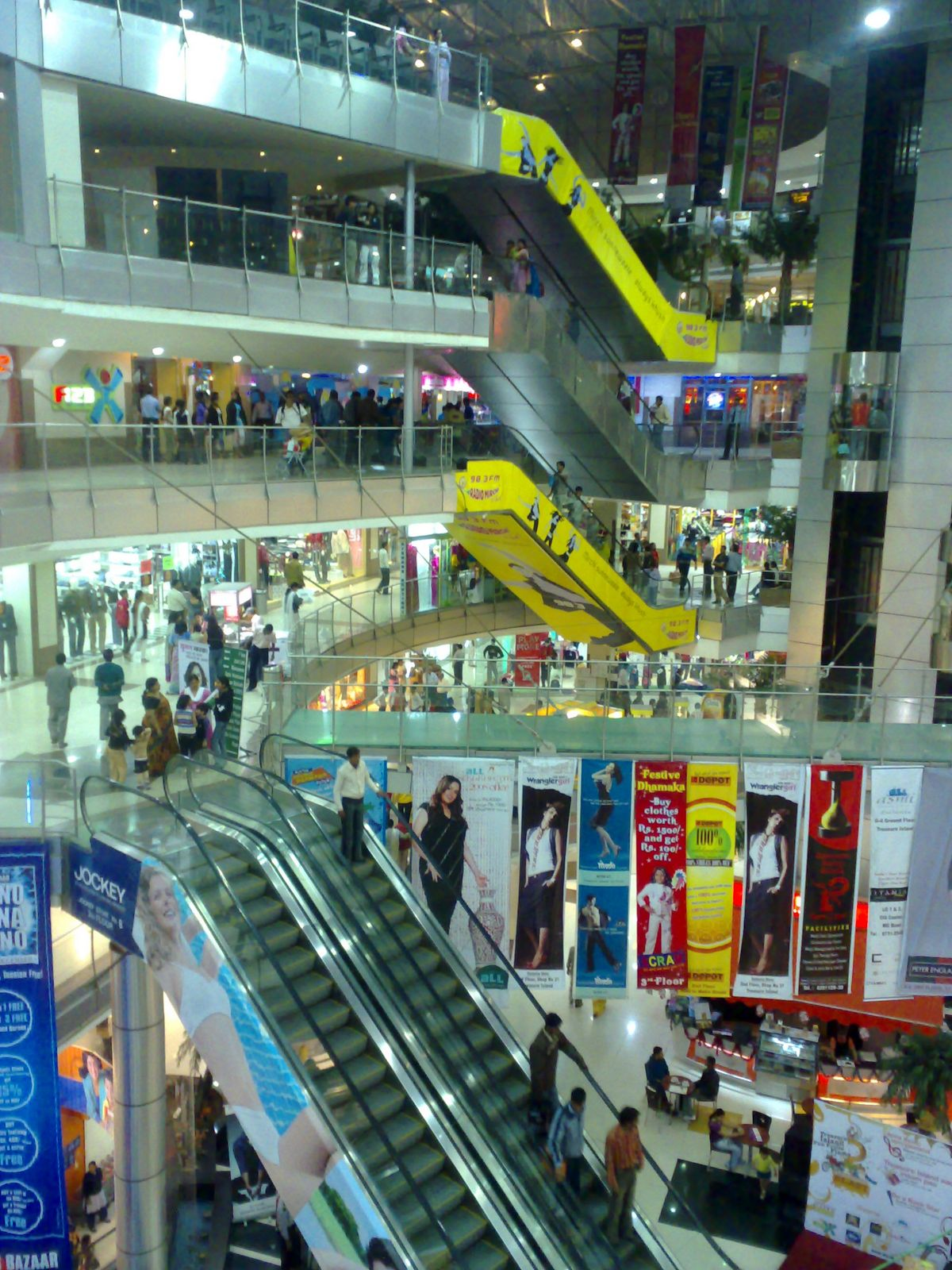
- Nexus Treasure Island Mall interior
- Location: Indore, India
- Coordinates: 22.72097°N 75.87853°E
- Address: 11, South Tukoganj, M.G. Road, Indore (M.P.)
- Opened: 2005
- Developer: Treasure Group
- Owner: Nexus Select Trust
- Floor area: 2,00,000 sq.ft.
- Floors: 8
- Parking: Multilevel
- Website: https://www.nexusselecttrust.com/nexus-treasure-island

Nexus Treasure Island Mall (popularly known as Treasure Island or TI Mall) is a shopping mall in the city of Indore in India. It was the first mall to be opened in Indore in the year 2005. The mall spans over 200,000 sq ft.

It is owned by the Nexus Select Trust and they operate 17 malls across 13 cities of India.

== Facilities ==
=== Stores ===
Pantaloons, Zudio, Marks & Spencer, Crocs, Adidas, Arrow, Allen Solly and more.

=== Multiplex ===
The mall features a 9-screen PVR Cinemas multiplex along with its premium offering Gold Class, 4DX and Playhouse.

=== Gaming ===
Two gamezones are currently functional in the mall. They have various activities like Bumper Cars, Bowling, Air Hockey etc. There is a scary house as well apart from the game zone.

== Controversy ==
The mall has been embroiled in a controversy regarding the diversion of land-use ever since its inception in 2005. The then chief minister of Madhya Pradesh Digvijaya Singh was at the center of this controversy.

== See also ==
- The Blackstone Group
