= Vijayvargiya (surname) =

Vijayvargiya is a surname. Notable people with the surname include:

- Akash Vijayvargiya, Indian politician
- Kailash Vijayvargiya, Indian politician
- Radhavallabh Vijayvargiya, Indian politician
- Ram Gopal Vijayvargiya, Indian painter
