= Narayan Singh Amlabe =

Indian politician

Narayan Singh

Member of Parliament, Lok Sabha
- In office 2009–2014
- Preceded by: Lakshman Singh
- Succeeded by: Rodmal Nagar
- Constituency: Rajgarh

Personal details
- Born: 1 June 1951 (age 75) Vill. Amlabe, Rajgarh district
- Party: Indian National Congress
- Spouse: Dev Bai (m. 1972)
- Children: 2 sons, 3 daughters
- Parents: Madho Singh (father); Gajra Bai (mother)
- Education: HSC
- As of 1 May, 2012 Source: []

Narayan Singh (born 1 June 1951 Village Amlabe, Rajgarh district) is an Indian politician, member of the Indian National Congress, member of the Committee on Agriculture, and member of the Consultative Committee for the Ministry of Rural Development and the Ministry of Panchayati Raj. In the 2009 election he was elected to the 15th Lok Sabha from the Rajgarh Lok Sabha constituency of Madhya Pradesh.

He was earlier Sarpanch for Gram Panchayat Amlabe village and President of Janpad Panchayat Jirapur.

He is an agriculturist and resides at Rajgarh district. He is married to Dev Bai and has three daughters and two sons.
