= Lakshman Singh (politician) =

Indian politician

Member of Madhya Pradesh Legislative Assembly
- In office 1990–1994
- Preceded by: Mool Singh
- Succeeded by: Digvijaya Singh
- Constituency: Raghogarh
- In office 2018–2023
- Preceded by: Mamta Meena
- Succeeded by: Priyanka Penchi
- Constituency: Chachoura

Member of Parliament, Lok Sabha
- In office 1994–2009
- Preceded by: Digvijaya Singh
- Succeeded by: Narayansingh Amlabe
- Constituency: Rajgarh

Personal details
- Born: 14 January 1955 (age 71) Indore, Madhya Bharat, India
- Party: Indian National Congress (1990–2004) (2013–2025)
- Other political affiliations: Bharatiya Janata Party (2004–2013)
- Spouse(s): Jagrati Singh (m. 1978–2001) Rubina Singh (m. 2001)
- Parent: Balbhadra Singh (father)
- Education: St. Stephen's College, Delhi
- Profession: Politician

Lakshman Balbhadra Singh (also spelled Laxman Singh) is an Indian politician who represented the Indian National Congress (INC), and later its rival BJP in the Lok Sabha, the lower house of the Parliament of India. He is a 5 term Member of Parliament and 3 term Member of legislative Assembly.

== Education and personal life ==
Lakshman Singh was born on 14 January 1955 in Indore, Madhya Pradesh. His father was Balbhadra Singh, who was an MLA (independent who supported Hindu Mahasabha) and had been the ruler of the former princely state of Raghogarh, the present day Guna district of Madhya Pradesh. His elder brother Digvijaya Singh was the Chief Minister of Madhya Pradesh as well as a member of the Lok Sabha. He studied at The Daly College, Indore, and St. Stephen's College, Delhi. In 1978, he married Jagrati Singh, and they later had a son and daughter. After her death he married Rubina Sharma in 2001.

== Political career ==
Singh was thrice elected as a member of the Madhya Pradesh Legislative Assembly, representing Raghogarh from 1990–1992 and 1993–1994, and Chachoura from 2018–2023. In 1994, he was elected to the 10th Lok Sabha in a by-election. He gained the second term in the 11th Lok Sabha in 1996 General Election and was elected to the 12th Lok Sabha in 1998 General Election. A further re-election followed in the 1999 General Election. All of these Lok Sabha elections were from the Rajgarh Lok Sabha constituency and as a candidate of the INC.

Singh switched political allegiance, joining the Bharatiya Janata Party (BJP), and was elected to the 14th Lok Sabha (2004-2009) from Rajgarh. But he lost the election for the 15th Lok Sabha, when Congress defeated BJP in Rajgarh constituency.

He returned to the Congress in January 2013.

Later in June 2025, Congress expelled Lakshman Singh, from primary membership for six years for making remarks against Rahul Gandhi. In a press release, the party stated that he has been removed from the Congress "with immediate effect" due to his anti-party activities.
