= K. R. Narayanan =

President of India from 1997 to 2002

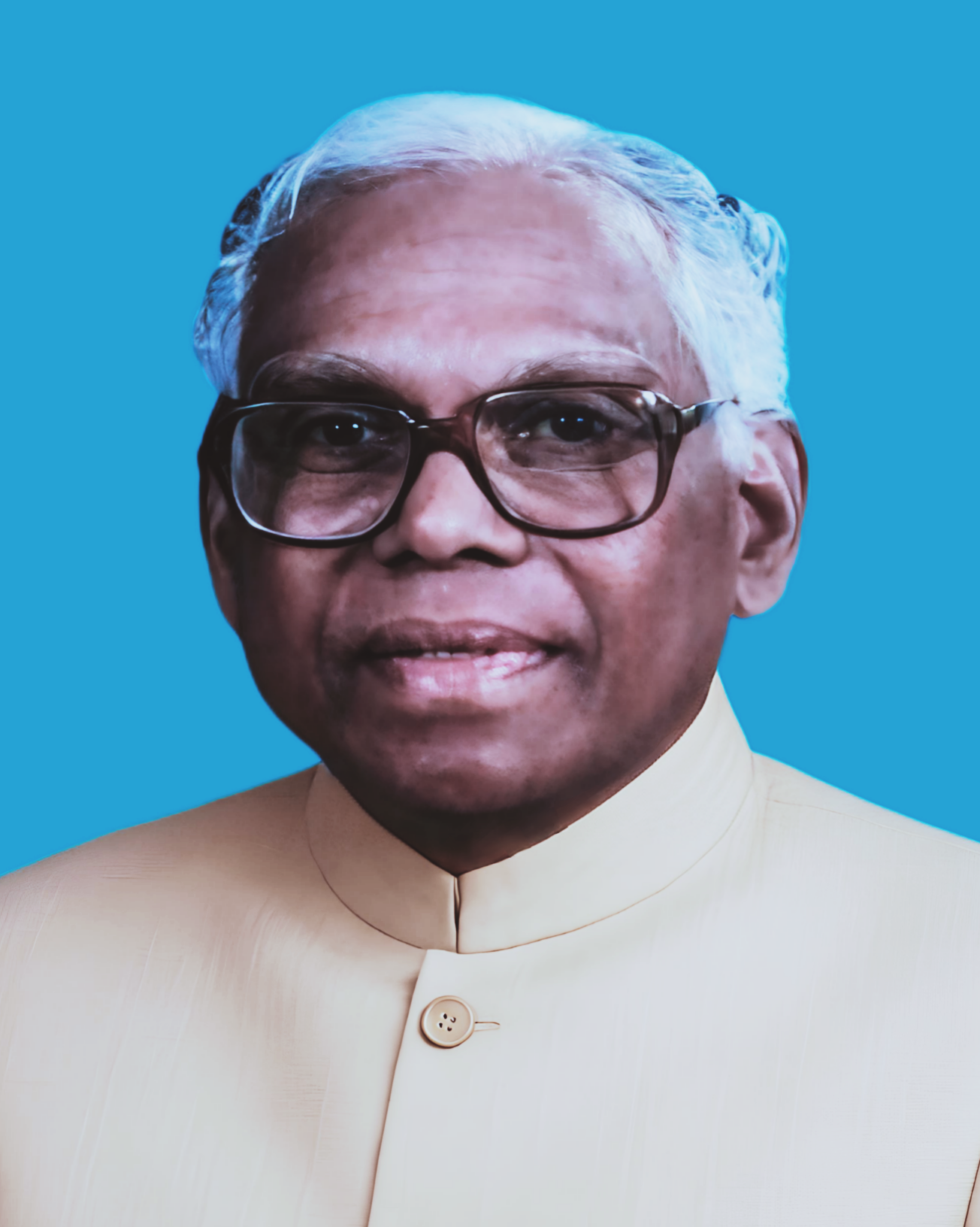
- Official portrait, 1997

President of India
- In office 25 July 1997 – 25 July 2002
- Prime Minister: Inder Kumar Gujral; Atal Bihari Vajpayee
- Vice President: Krishan Kant
- Preceded by: Shankar Dayal Sharma
- Succeeded by: A. P. J. Abdul Kalam

Vice President of India
- In office 21 August 1992 – 24 July 1997
- President: Shankar Dayal Sharma
- Prime Minister: P. V. Narasimha Rao; Atal Bihari Vajpayee; H. D. Deve Gowda; Imder Kumar Gujral
- Preceded by: Shankar Dayal Sharma
- Succeeded by: Krishan Kant

Member of Parliament, Lok Sabha
- In office 31 December 1984 – 26 July 1992
- Preceded by: A. K. Balan
- Succeeded by: Sivaraman
- Constituency: Ottapalam, Kerala

Ambassador of India to the United States
- In office 1980 – 1984
- Preceded by: Nanabhoy Palkhivala

Ambassador of India to China
- In office 7 July 1976 – 11 November 1978
- Succeeded by: Ram Sathe

Personal details
- Born: 27 October 1920 Uzhavoor, Kingdom of Travancore, British India (present-day Kottayam, Kerala, India)
- Died: 9 November 2005 (aged 85) New Delhi, Delhi, India
- Spouse: Usha Narayanan (m. 1951)
- Children: 2 (including Chitra Narayanan)
- Education: London School of Economics; (B.Sc) University of Kerala (B.A, M.A)
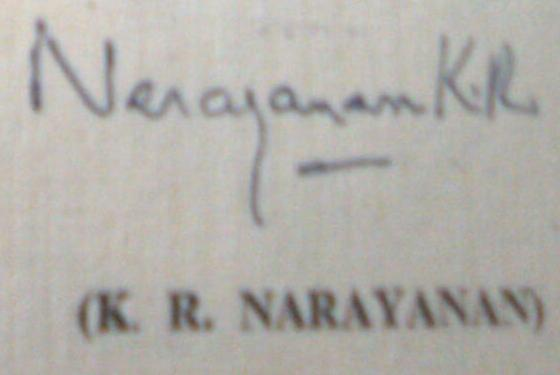
- Signature

Kocheril Raman Narayanan (27 October 1920 – 9 November 2005) was an Indian diplomat, academician, and statesman who served as the president of India from 1997 to 2002 and vice president of India from 1992 to 1997.

Narayanan was born in Perumthanam, Uzhavoor village, in the princely state of Travancore (present day Kottayam district, Kerala) into a Hindu family. After a brief stint with journalism and then studies at the London School of Economics with the assistance of a scholarship, Narayanan began his career in India as a member of the Indian Foreign Service in the Nehru administration. He served as ambassador to a number of countries, most principally to the United States and China, and was referred by Nehru as "the best diplomat of the country". He entered politics at Indira Gandhi's request and won three successive general elections to the Lok Sabha and served as a Minister of State in prime minister Rajiv Gandhi's cabinet. Elected as vice president in 1992, Narayanan went on to become president in 1997 and became the first Dalit to occupy either position.

Narayanan is regarded as an independent and assertive president who set several precedents and enlarged the scope of the presidency. He described himself as a "working president" who worked "within the four corners of the Constitution"; something midway between an "executive president" who has direct power and a "rubber-stamp president" who endorses government decisions without question or deliberation. He used his discretionary powers as a president and deviated from convention and precedent in many situations, including the appointment of the prime minister in a hung Parliament, in dismissing a state government and imposing President's rule there at the suggestion of the Union Cabinet, and during the Kargil conflict. He presided over the golden jubilee celebrations of Indian independence and in the country's general election of 1998, he became the first Indian president to vote when in office, setting another new precedent. As of 2025, he remains the last Indian to have been elected president, while serving as vice president.

== Early life ==
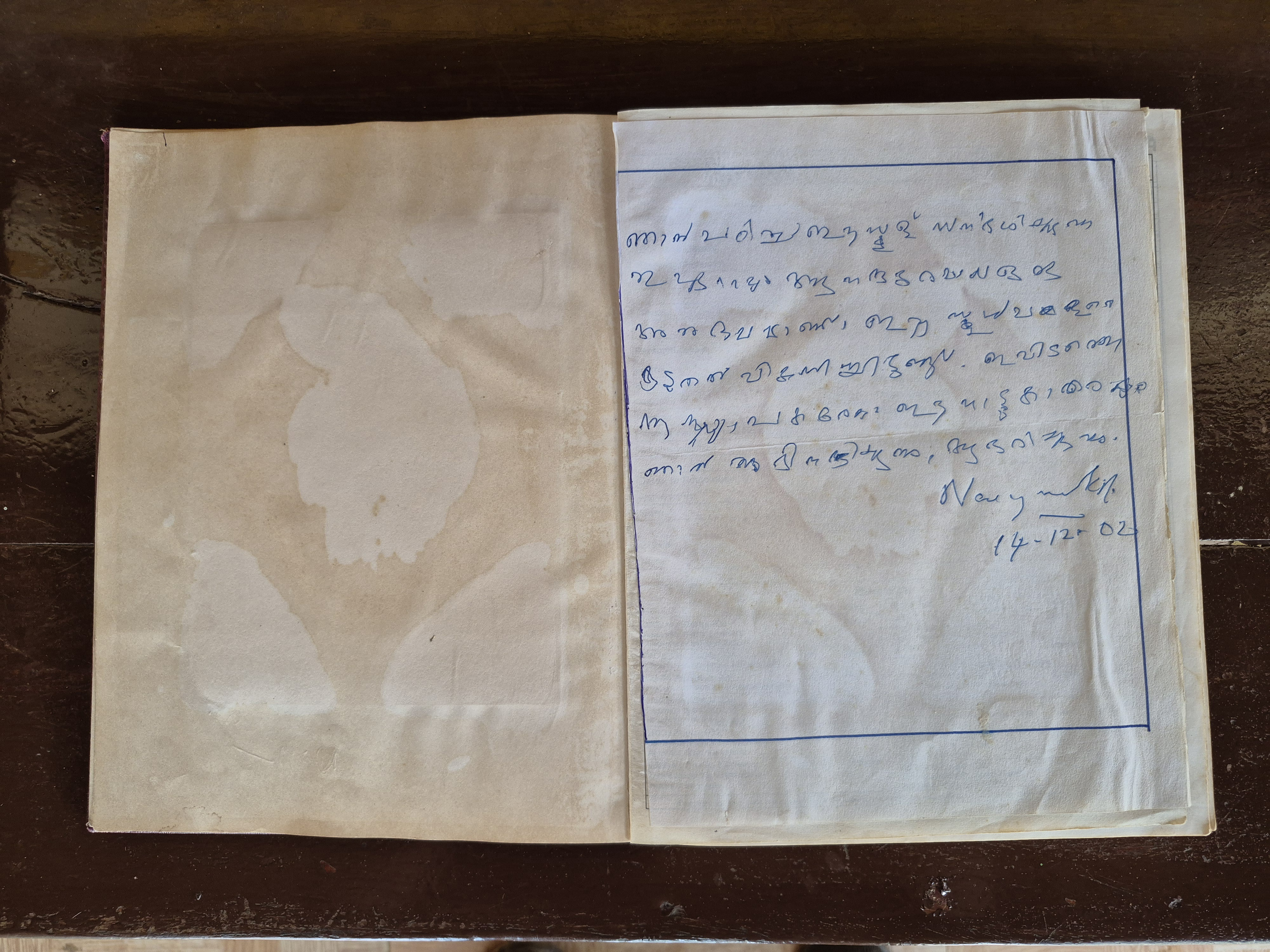
Handwriting of K R Narayanan

K. R. Narayanan was born at Perumthanam, Uzhavoor, as the fourth of seven children of Paappiyamma (of the Punnaththuraveettil house) and Kocheril Raman Vaidyar of the Kocheril house and a practitioner of the traditional Indian medical system of Ayurveda. His siblings were Vasudevan, Neelakandan, Gowri, Bhaskaran, Bhargavi and Bharathi. His family, belonging to the Paravar caste (whose members are involved in fishery, boatbuilding, sea trade), was poor, but his father was respected for his medical acumen.

Narayanan had his early schooling in Uzhavoor at the Government Lower Primary School, Kurichithanam (where he enrolled on 5 May 1927) and Our Lady of Lourdes Upper Primary School, Uzhavoor (1931–35). He walked to school for about 15 kilometres daily through paddy fields, and was often unable to pay the modest fees. He often listened to school lessons while standing outside the classroom, having been barred from attending because tuition fees were outstanding. The family lacked money to buy books and his elder brother K. R. Neelakantan, who was confined to home as he was suffering from asthma, used to borrow books from other students, copy them down, and give them to Narayanan. He matriculated from St. Mary's High School, Kuravilangad (1936–37) (he had studied at St. John's High School, Koothattukulam (1935–36) previously). He completed his intermediate at C. M. S. College, Kottayam (1938–40), aided by a scholarship from the Travancore Royal family.

Narayanan obtained his B. A. (Honors) and M.A. in English literature from the University of Travancore (1940–43) (present day University of Kerala), standing first in the university (thus becoming the first Dalit to obtain this degree with first class in Travancore). With his family facing grave difficulties, he left for Delhi and worked for some time as a journalist with The Hindu and The Times of India (1944–45). During this time, he once interviewed Mahatma Gandhi in Bombay on his own volition (10 April 1945).

In 1944, Narayanan was awarded a Tata Scholarship of Rs. 16,000 by J. R. D. Tata to read politics, economics and journalism at the London School of Economics and was awarded Bachelor of Science honors in Economics with specialisation in political science from the University of London. At the LSE (1945), he studied political science under Harold Laski; he also attended lectures by Karl Popper, Lionel Robbins, and Friedrich Hayek. During his years in London, he (along with fellow student K. N. Raj) was active in the India League under V. K. Krishna Menon. He was also the London correspondent of the Social Welfare Weekly published by K. M. Munshi. At the LSE he shared lodgings with K. N. Raj and Veerasamy Ringadoo (who later became the first president of Mauritius); another close friend was Pierre Trudeau (who later became Prime minister of Canada).

=== Diplomat and academician ===
When Narayanan returned to India in 1948, Laski gave him a letter of introduction to Prime Minister Jawaharlal Nehru. Years later, he narrated how he began his career in the public service:

Shri Krishna

When I finished with LSE, Laski, of his own, gave me a letter of introduction for Panditji. On reaching Delhi I sought an appointment with the PM. I suppose, because I was an Indian student returning home from London, I was given a timeslot. It was here in Parliament House that he met me. We talked for a few minutes about London and things like that and I could soon see that it was time for me to leave. So, I said goodbye and as I left the room, I handed over the letter from Laski and stepped out into the great circular corridor outside. When I was halfway round, I heard the sound of someone clapping from the direction I had just come. I turned to see Panditji [Nehru] beckoning me to come back. He had opened the letter as I left his room and read it. [Nehru asked:] "Why didn't you give this to me earlier?" [and KRN replied:] "Well, sir, I am sorry. I thought it would be enough if I just handed it over while leaving." After a few more questions, he asked me to see him again and very soon I found myself entering the Indian Foreign Service.

In 1949, he joined the Indian Foreign Service (IFS) on Nehru's request, and was appointed an attaché in the Ministry of External Affairs (MEA) on 18 April of that year. He worked as a diplomat in the embassies at Rangoon, Tokyo, London, Canberra, and Hanoi. Narayanan's diplomatic career proceeded as follows:

- Second Secretary, Indian Liaison Mission in Tokyo (appointed 19 August 1951)
- Appointment in the IFS confirmed (29 July 1953)
- First Secretary, High Commission of India to the United Kingdom (relinquished 17 December 1957)
- Deputy Secretary, Ministry of External Affairs (relinquished 11 July 1960)
- First Secretary, High Commission of India to Australia, including period as Acting High Commissioner of India, Canberra (relinquished 27 September 1961)
- Consul-General of India (Hanoi), North Vietnam
- Ambassador to Thailand (1967–69)
- Ambassador to Turkey (5 March 1973–1975)
- Secretary (East), Ministry of External Affairs (relinquished 1 May 1976)
- Ambassador to the People's Republic of China (appointed 1 May 1976)

During his diplomatic career, Narayanan also taught at the Delhi School of Economics (DSE) (1954) and was Jawaharlal Nehru fellow (1970–72). He retired from the IFS in 1978.

After his retirement, Narayanan served as the Vice-Chancellor of Jawaharlal Nehru University (JNU) in New Delhi from 3 January 1979 – 14 October 1980; he would later describe this experience as the foundation for his public life. Subsequently, he was recalled from retirement to serve as Indian Ambassador to the United States from 1980 to 1984, under the Indira Gandhi administration. Narayanan's tenures as Indian ambassador to China, the first such high level Indian diplomatic posting in that country after the 1962 Sino-Indian War, and to the US where he helped arrange Ms. Gandhi's landmark 1982 visit to Washington during the Reagan presidency helped mend India's strained relations with both these countries. Nehru, who had also been the Minister for External Affairs during his 16 years as PM, held that K. R. Narayanan was "the best diplomat of the country."(1955)

== Family ==
While working in Rangoon, Burma (Myanmar), K. R. Narayanan met Ma Tint Tint, whom he later married in Delhi on 8 June 1951. Ma Tint Tint was active in the YWCA and on hearing that Narayanan was a student of Laski, approached him to speak on political freedom before her circle of acquaintances. Their marriage needed a special dispensation from Nehru as per Indian law, because Narayanan was in the IFS and she was a foreigner. Ma Tint Tint adopted the Indian name Usha and became an Indian citizen. Usha Narayanan (1923–2008) worked on several social welfare programs for women and children in India and completed her master's degree in Social Work from Delhi School of Social Work. She also translated and published several Burmese short stories; a collection of translated stories by Thein Pe Myint, titled Sweet and Sour, appeared in 1998. She is the first woman of foreign origin to have become the First Lady of India. They have two daughters, Chitra Narayanan (Indian ambassador to Switzerland and The Holy See) and Amrita.

== Political initiation ==
Narayanan entered politics at the request of Indira Gandhi and won three successive general elections to the Lok Sabha in 1984, 1989 and 1991, as a representative of the Ottapalam constituency in Palakkad, Kerala, on a Congress ticket. He was a Minister of State in the Union cabinet under Rajiv Gandhi, holding the portfolios of Planning (1985), External Affairs (1985–86), and Science and Technology (1986–89). As a Member of Parliament, he resisted international pressure to tighten patent controls in India. He sat in the opposition benches when the Congress was voted out of power during 1989–91. Narayanan was not included in the cabinet when the Congress returned to power in 1991. K. Karunakaran, Congress Chief Minister of Kerala, a political adversary of his, informed him that he was not made a minister because of him being a "Communist fellow-traveller". He did not, however, respond when Narayanan pointed out that he had defeated Communist candidates (A. K. Balan and Lenin Rajendran, the latter twice) in all three elections.

== Vice Presidency and Presidency ==
=== Vice President of India (1992–1997) ===
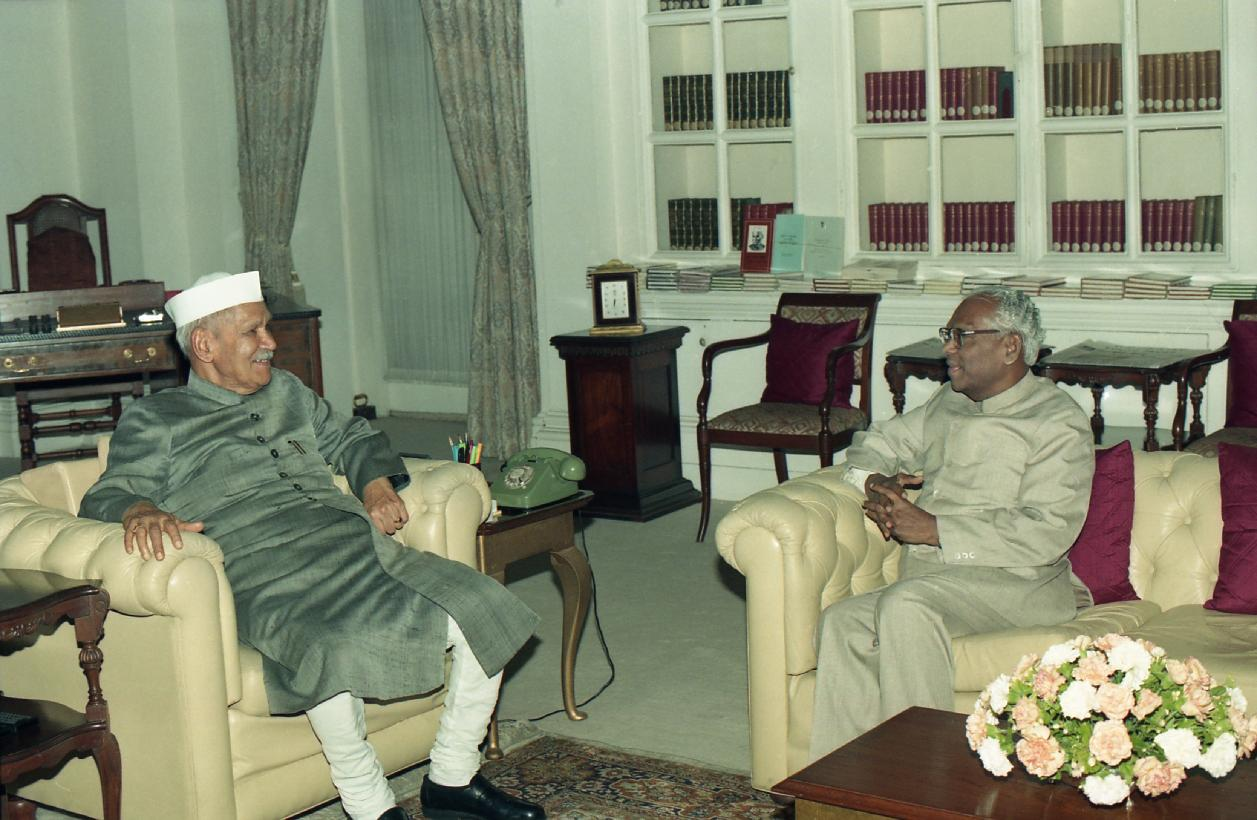
Vice President of India K. R. Narayanan meeting with the President, Shankar Dayal Sharma

=== Vice Presidential election ===
K. R. Narayanan was elected as the vice-president of India on 21 August 1992, under the presidency of Shankar Dayal Sharma. His name had been proposed initially by V. P. Singh, former prime minister and the then leader of the Janata Dal parliamentary party. The Janata Dal and the parliamentary left parties had jointly declared him as their candidate, and this had later garnered support from the Congress under P. V. Narasimha Rao, leading to a unanimous decision on his election. On his relationship with the Left front, Narayanan later clarified that he was neither a devotee nor a blind opponent of Communism; they had known of his ideological differences, but had supported him as vice-president (and later as president) because of special political circumstances that prevailed in the country. He had benefited from their support, and in turn, their political positions had gained acceptability. When the Babri Masjid was demolished on 6 December 1992, he described the event as the "greatest tragedy India has faced since the assassination of Mahatma Gandhi".

=== President of India (1997–2002) ===
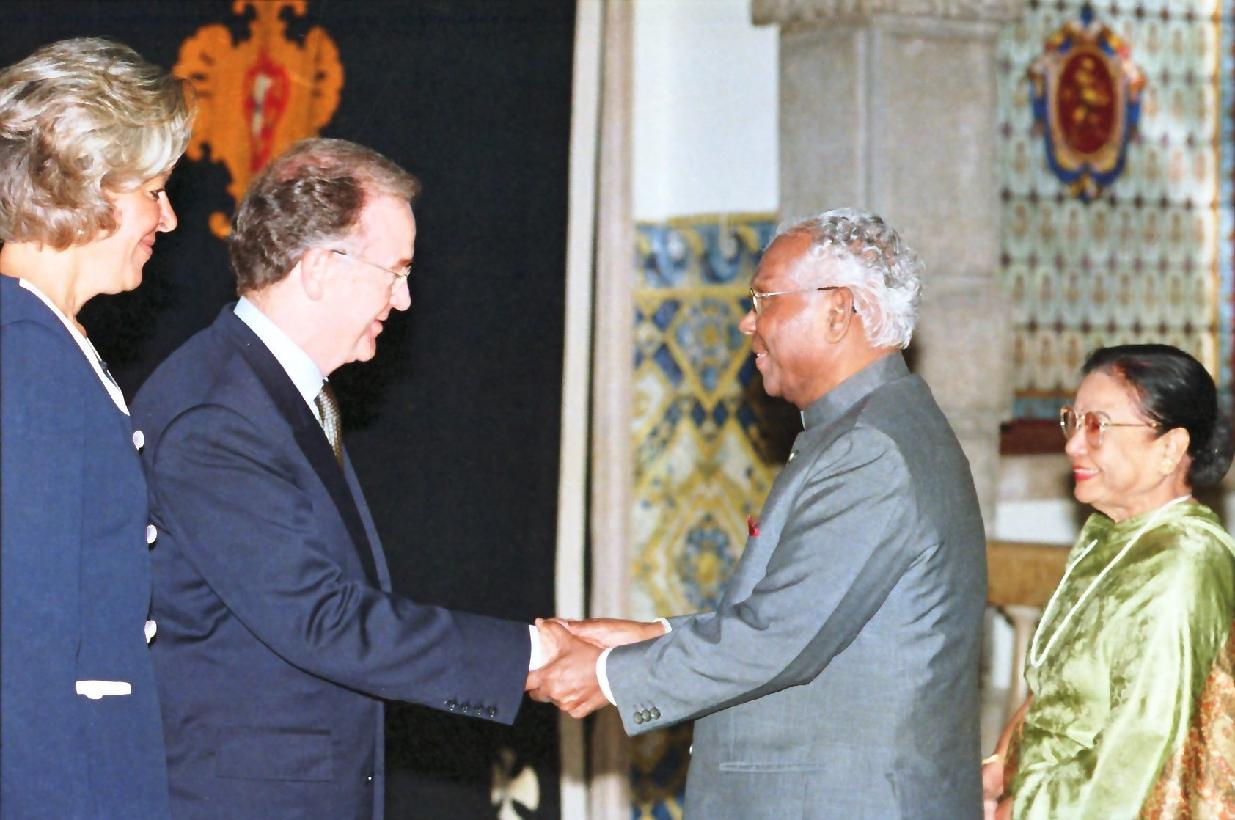
President Narayanan is welcomed by President Jorge Sampaio and his wife Maria Rodrigues in Portugal, September 1998

=== Presidential election ===
K. R. Narayanan was elected to the presidency of India (17 July 1997) with 95% of the votes in the electoral college, as a result of the presidential poll on 14 July. This is the only presidential election to have been held with a minority government holding power at the centre. T. N. Seshan was the sole opposing candidate, and all major parties save the Shiv Sena supported his candidature., while Seshan alleged that Narayanan had been elected solely for being a Dalit.

He was sworn in as the president of India (25 July 1997) by Chief Justice J. S. Verma in the Central Hall of Parliament. In his inaugural address, he said:

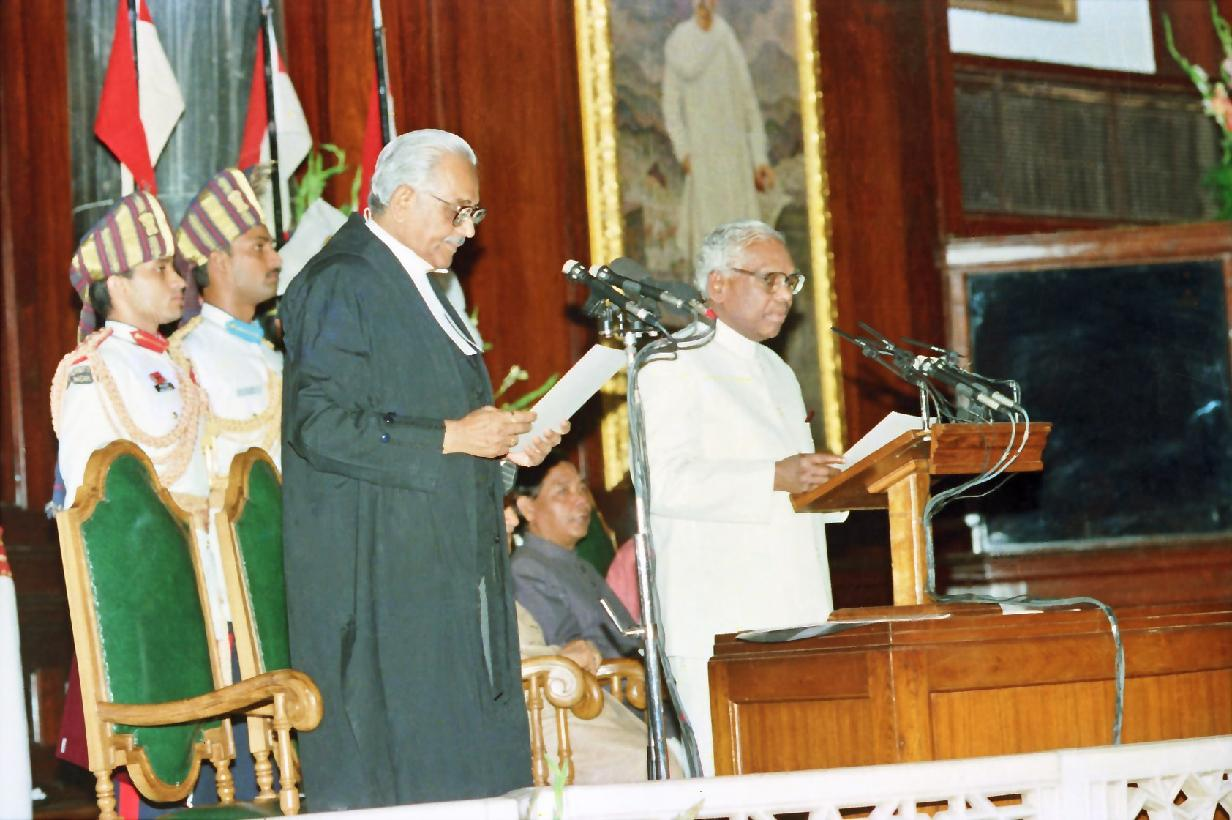
K. R. Narayanan being sworn in as the president of India

That the nation has found a consensus for its highest office in some one who has sprung from the grass-roots of our society and grown up in the dust and heat of this sacred land is symbolic of the fact that the concerns of the common man have now moved to the centre stage of our social and political life. It is this larger significance of my election rather than any personal sense of honour that makes me rejoice on this occasion.

Golden Jubilee of independence

The principal event of the Golden Jubilee of Indian independence was President K. R. Narayanan's midnight address to the nation during the special session of Parliament convened on the night of 14 August; in this address, he identified the establishment of a democratic system of government and politics to be the greatest achievement of India since independence. The following morning, Prime Minister I. K. Gujral, addressing the nation from the ramparts of the Red Fort, said:

When Gandhiji dreamt of India's future, he had said that the country will attain the real freedom only on the day when a Dalit would become the President of this country. This is our great fortune that today on the eve of golden jubilee of independence, we have been able to fulfil this dream of Gandhiji. In the person of Shri K. R. Narayanan we have been able to fulfil the dream of Gandhiji. Our President of whom the whole country is proud of, is from a very poor and downtrodden family and today he has endowed the Rashtrapati Bhavan with a new pride and respect. It is a matter of further happiness that the President has a very high place among the intellectuals of this country. This is a feather in the cap of our democracy that the backward sections of the society today are attaining their rightful place in society. All the countrymen today whether they are from minorities, scheduled castes [Dalits], or scheduled tribes [Adivasis] – are working unitedly for the development of the country.

Participation in the elections

In the general elections of 1998, K. R. Narayanan became the first sitting president to vote (16 February 1998), casting his vote at a polling booth in a school within the Rashtrapati Bhavan complex after standing in a queue like an ordinary citizen. He insisted on casting his vote, despite the departure from precedent being pointed out to him. Narayanan sought to change what was a long-standing practice of Indian presidents not voting during general elections. He also exercised his franchise as president in the 1999 general elections.

Golden jubilee of the Republic

President K. R. Narayanan's address to the nation on the golden jubilee of the Indian Republic (26 January 2000) is considered a landmark: it was the first time a president attempted to analyse, with due concern for growing disparities, the several ways in which the country had failed to provide economic justice to the Indian people, particularly the rural and agrarian population; he also stated that discontent was breeding and frustrations erupting in violence among the deprived sections of society. In his address to Parliament later that day, he praised the work of B. R. Ambedkar on the Indian constitution and cautioned against attempts to change its basic structure, concurring with Ambedkar's preference for accountability and responsibility over the stability of the government. He reiterated this in stronger terms in his next Republic day address (2001); on this occasion, he took exception to certain proposals seeking to abridge the franchise, and pointed out the wisdom of reposing faith in the common men and women of India as a whole, rather than in some elite section of society.

In these addresses, he articulated opinions which departed in many ways from certain views of the A. B. Vajpayee government.

=== Exercise of presidential discretion ===
President Narayanan introduced the important practice of explaining to the nation (by means of Rashtrapati Bhavan communiqués) the thinking that led to the various decisions he took while exercising his discretionary powers; this has led to openness and transparency in the functioning of the president.

Appointment of the prime minister and dissolution of Parliament

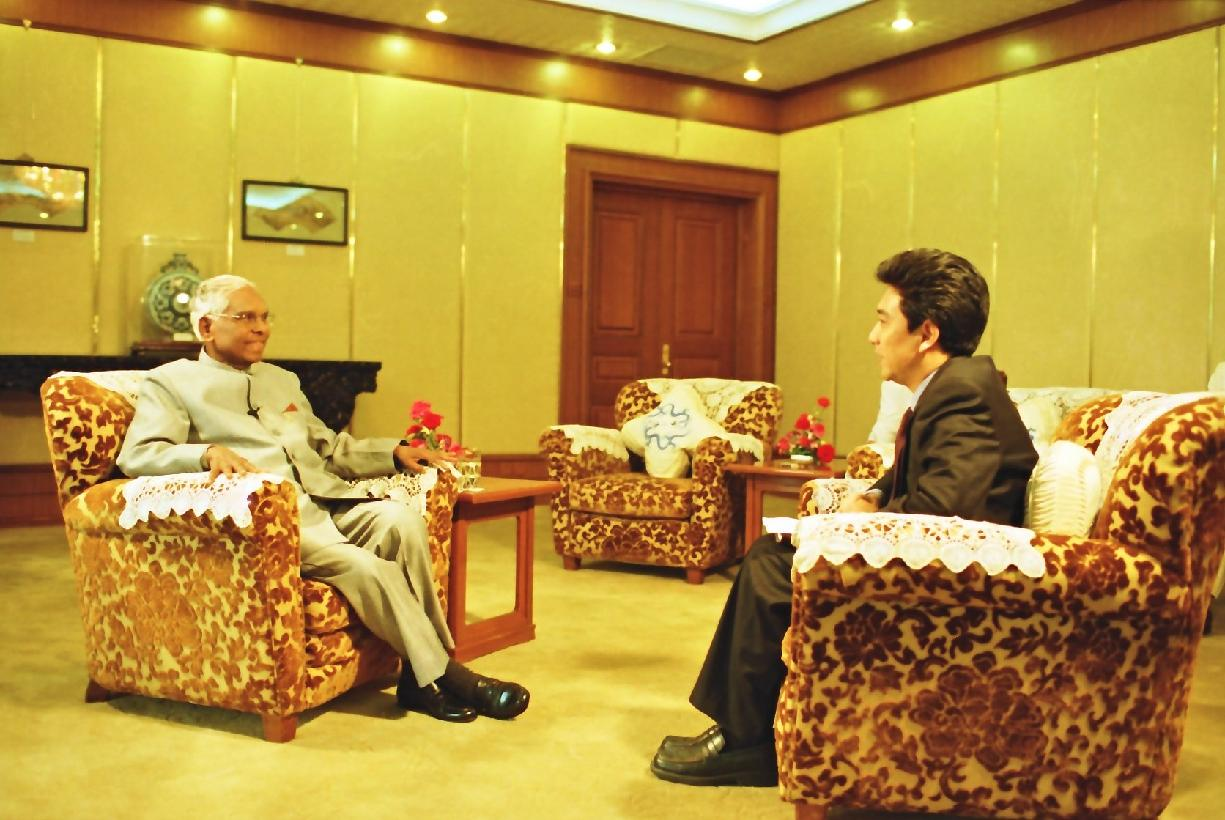
The President of India, K. R. Narayanan during an interview with China Central Television

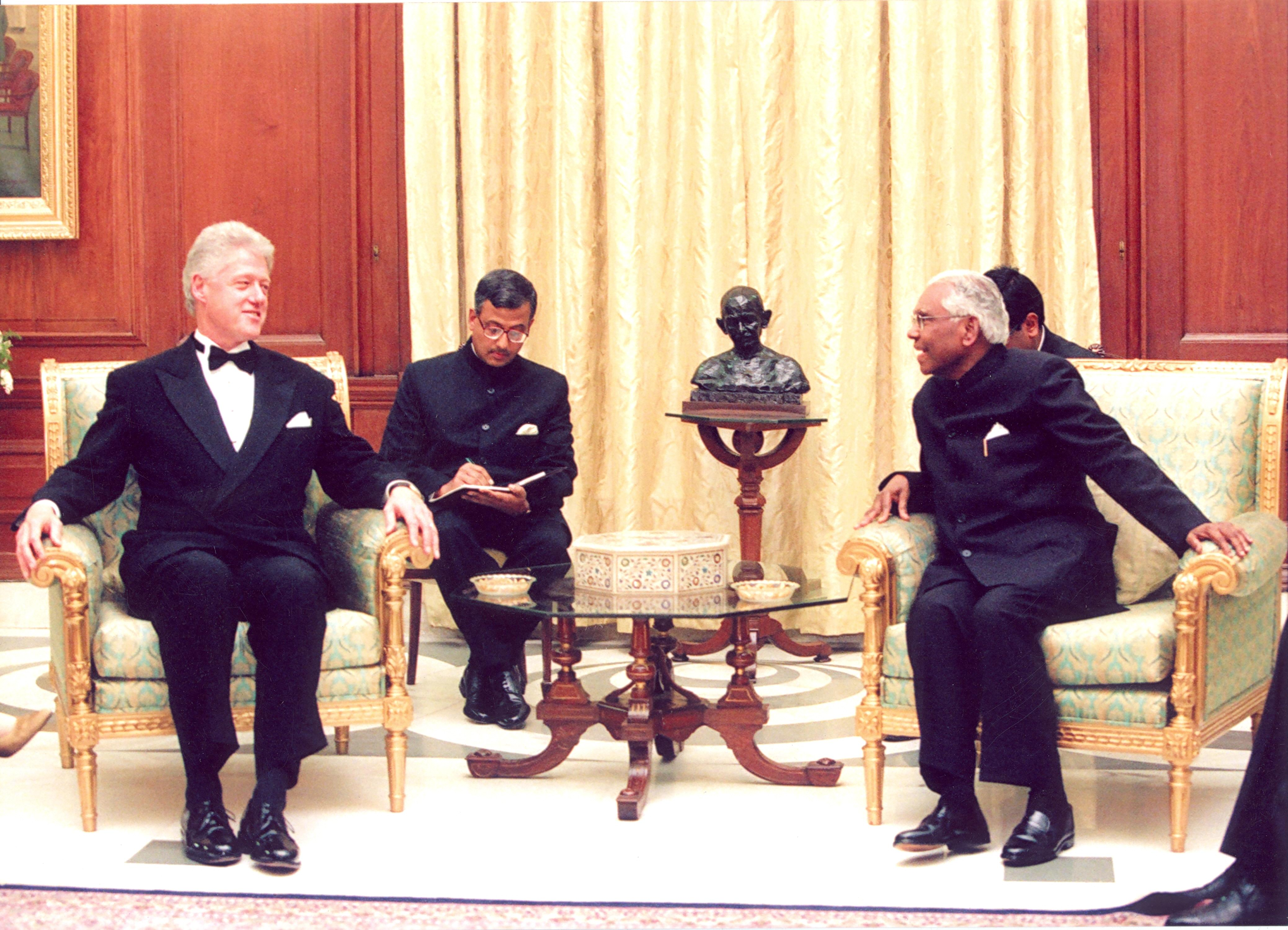
President Clinton with Indian president K. R. Narayanan

During his presidency, Narayanan dissolved the Lok Sabha twice after determining through consultations across the political spectrum, that no one was in a position to secure the confidence of the house. Congress president Sitaram Kesri withdrew his party's support of the I. K. Gujral government and staked his claim to form the government on 28 November 1997. Gujral advised Narayanan of the dissolution of the Lok Sabha. President Narayanan determined that no one would be able to secure a majority in the Lok Sabha and accepted Gujral's advice (4 December). In the ensuing general elections, the Bharatiya Janata Party (BJP) emerged as the single largest party, leading the largest pre-election coalition, the National Democratic Alliance (NDA), and the coalition leader Vajpayee staked his claim to form the government, though at that point he did not have a majority. Narayanan asked Vajpayee to furnish letters of support to demonstrate the NDA's ability to secure a majority. Vajpayee was able to meet this demand after support for the NDA grew, and subsequently he was appointed Prime Minister (15 March 1998) on the condition (which was met) that a vote of confidence be secured within 10 days.

One of the coalition partners supporting the minority government (the All India Anna Dravida Munnetra Kazhagam under J. Jayalalithaa) wrote a letter to the President withdrawing support on 14 April 1999, and Narayanan advised Vajpayee to seek a vote of confidence in the Lok Sabha. This motion was defeated (17 April). Both Vajpayee and the Congress president Sonia Gandhi (who considered as Leader of opposition), then staked claims to form the government. Narayanan asked the NDA and the Congress party to show proof of support since the loss of the confidence vote. When evidence from neither party was forthcoming, Narayanan informed the Prime Minister that fresh elections seemed to be the only way to resolve the crisis in governance. The Lok Sabha was then dissolved at Vajpayee's advice (26 April). (In the ensuing general elections, the NDA secured a majority and Vajpayee was reappointed Prime Minister (11 October 1999) in a straightforward manner.)

In these decisions, President Narayanan set a new precedent concerning the appointment of a prime minister – if no party or pre-election coalition had a majority, then a person would be appointed prime minister only if he was able to convince the president (through letters of support from allied parties) of his ability to secure the confidence of the house. In doing so, he diverged from the actions of his predecessors who had been faced with the task of appointing a prime minister from a hung parliament, Presidents N. Sanjiva Reddy, R. Venkataraman, and Shankar Dayal Sharma: the latter two had followed the practice of inviting the leader of the single largest party or pre-election coalition to form the government without investigating their ability to secure the confidence of the house.

Imposition of President's rule

President Narayanan returned for reconsideration the advices from the Union cabinet to impose President's rule in a state, in accordance with Article 356, in two instances: one from the Gujral government (22 October 1997) seeking to dismiss the Kalyan Singh government in Uttar Pradesh, and the other from the Vajpayee government (25 September 1998) seeking to dismiss the Rabri Devi government in Bihar. In both instances, he cited the Supreme court judgement of 1994 on S. R. Bommai vs. Union of India and exercised his discretion by, in the former case, returning the matter for reconsideration of the cabinet, which then decided not to move ahead in the matter. However, in the latter case, the cabinet re-advised the same to the president after couple of months, It was then the President's rule was imposed in Bihar in February 1999.

Kargil conflict

A military conflict was developed in Kargil on the Line of Control (LoC) with Pakistan in May 1999. The Vajpayee government had lost a no-confidence vote in Lok Sabha earlier that year and the opposition failed to form the next government. The Lok Sabha had been dissolved and a caretaker government was in office. This caused a problem with democratic accountability, as every major government decision is expected to be discussed, deliberated and consented by the parliament. Narayanan suggested to Vajpayee that the Rajya Sabha be convened to discuss the conflict, as demanded by several opposition parties (citing the precedent of Nehru convening a parliamentary session on Vajpayee's demand during the Sino-Indian war in 1962 ) though there was no precedent of convening the Rajya Sabha in isolation during an interregnum. Further, Narayanan was briefed by the chiefs of the three arms of the Indian Armed Forces on the conduct of the conflict. His Republic day address next year began by paying homage to the soldiers who had died defending the nation.

=== Concern for social and economic justice ===
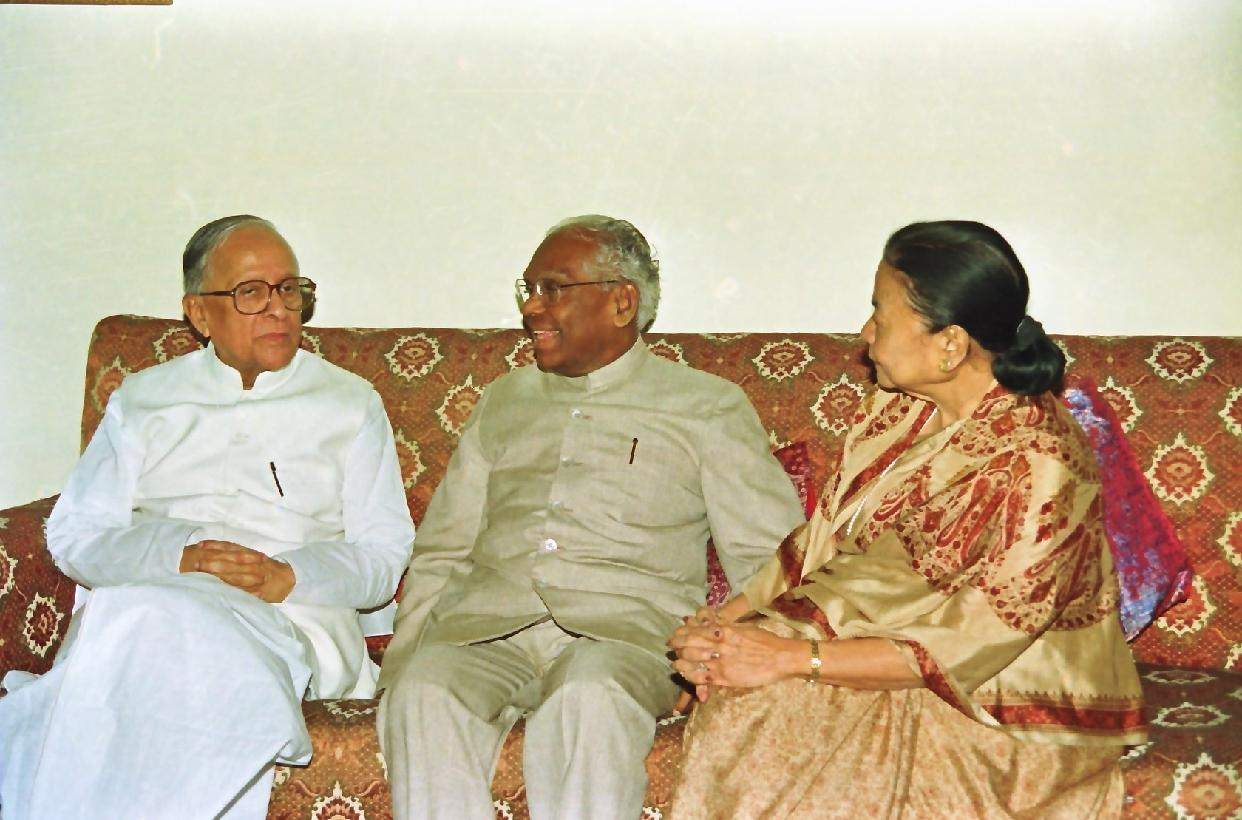
K. R. Narayanan and Usha Narayanan with Jyoti Basu

President Narayanan in his speeches consistently sought to remind the nation of its duties and obligations towards the Dalits and Adivasis, the minorities, and the poor and downtrodden. He called the nation's attention to various recalcitrant social ills and evils, such as atrocities against women and children, caste discrimination and the ingrained attitudes it nurtured, abuse of the environment and public utilities, corruption and lack of accountability in the delivery of public services, religious fundamentalism, advertisement-driven consumerism, and flouting of human rights, and lamented the absence of public concern, political debate, and civic action to address them. Drawing from the experiences of his own home state Kerala, he pointed out that education was at the root of human and economic development. He hoped that the establishment would not fear the awakening of the masses through education, and spoke of the need to have faith in the people.

President Narayanan spoke on various occasions on the condition of the Dalits, Adivasis, and other oppressed sections of society, and the various iniquities they faced (often in defiance of law), such as denial of civic amenities, ostracism, harassment and violence (particularly against women), and displacement by ill-conceived development projects.

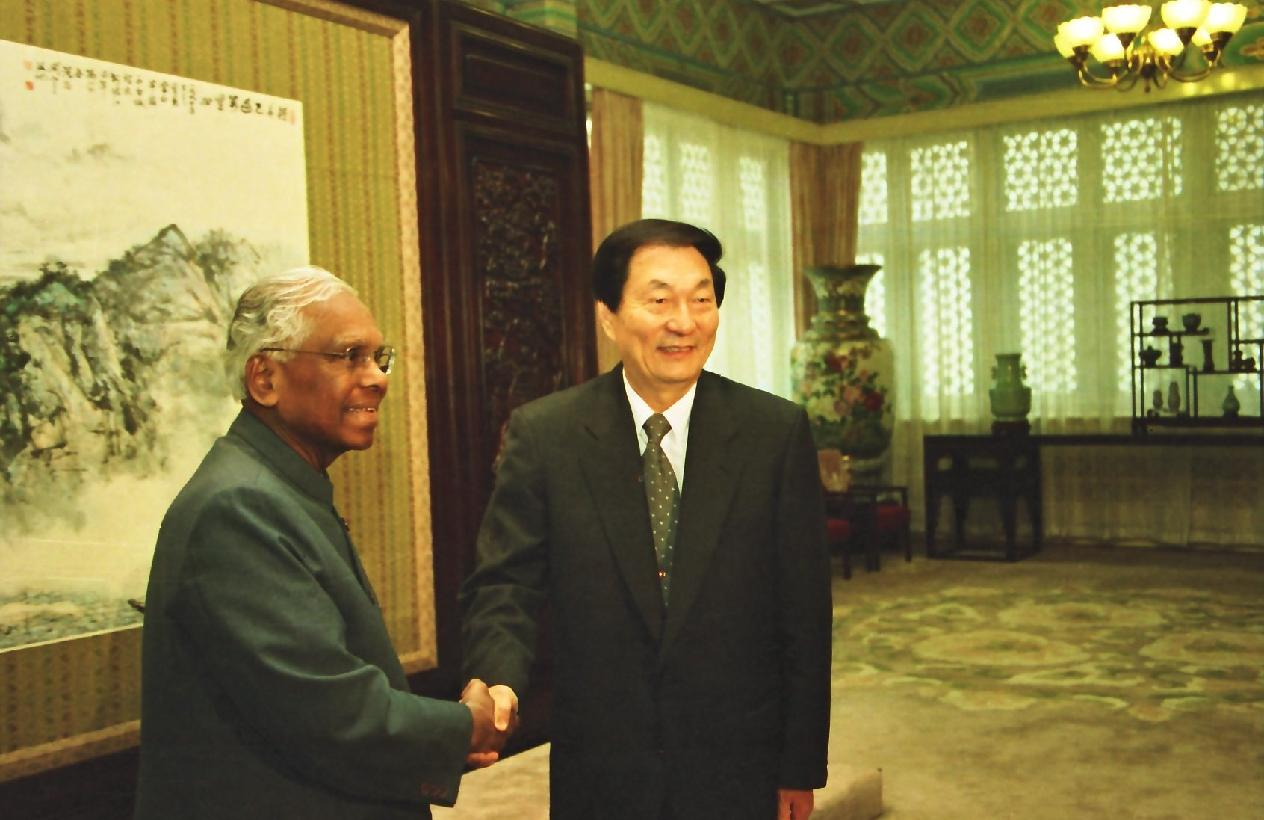
The President of India, Shri K. R. Narayanan meeting with the Premier of the People's Republic of China, Mr. Zhu Rongji at Beijing

He felt that the policy of reservations for the backward sections in education and the public sector had remained unfulfilled due to administrative distortions and narrow interpretations, and needed to be implemented with renewed vigour and sincerity; apprehensive of what he described as a counter-revolution among some privileged sections seeking to reverse progressive policies, he reminded the nation that these benefits were not charity, but had been provided by way of human rights and social justice to sections constituting a large portion of the population and contributing to the economy as landless agricultural labourers and industrial workers. In his 2002 Republic day address, he drew attention to the Bhopal Declaration. on the Dalit and Adivasi agenda for the 21st century and spoke of the necessity of the private sector adopting policies to promote equitable representation of the backward sections in their enterprises. In a governmental note on higher judicial appointments (which leaked to the press; January 1999), he observed that eligible persons from the backward sections were available and that their under-representation or non-representation was not justifiable; K. G. Balakrishnan, a Dalit, was elevated to the Supreme court (8 June 2000), the fourth such instance, and the only one since 1989.

He felt that Ambedkar's exhortation to "educate, organise, agitate" continued to be relevant; with the Dalits forming a quarter of the population in a democracy with universal adult franchise, he felt that the ultimate destiny of the backward sections lay in the hands of the backward sections themselves, organised socially and politically.

When the Australian missionary and social worker Graham Staines and his two minor sons were burned alive (22 January 1999), President Narayanan condemned it as a barbarous crime belonging to the world's inventory of black deeds.

Towards the end of his presidency, communal riots broke out in Gujarat (February 2002). President Narayanan was deeply pained and anguished, and described it as a grave crisis of the society and the nation; he called it the duty of every Indian to strive to restore peace and thus preserve and strengthen the foundations of the state and the tradition of tolerance. He did not stand the election for a second presidential term due to the lack of support from the ruling government. After the demission of presidential office, he lent his support to alternative globalisation movements like the World Social Forum. After he had left the presidency, and after the Vajpayee government had been voted out of power in the general elections of May 2004, in an interview on the third anniversary of the riots (in February 2005), he said;

There was governmental and administrative support for the communal riots in Gujarat. I gave several letters to Prime Minister Vajpayee in this regard on this issue. I met him personally and talked to him directly. But Vajpayee did not do anything effective.

I requested him to send the army to Gujarat and suppress the riots. The military was sent, but they were not given powers to shoot. If the military was given powers to shoot at the perpetrators of violence, recurrence of tragedies in Gujarat could have been avoided.

However, both the state (the Narendra Modi government) and central government did not do so. I feel there was a conspiracy involving the state and central governments behind the Gujarat riots.

He also stated that constitutional limits on his powers had prevented him from doing anything further. Throughout his presidency, Narayanan adopted the policy of not visiting places of worship or godmen/godwomen; he is the only president to have followed this practice.

=== Demission of office ===
As Narayanan's tenure neared its end, various sections of public opinion looked forward to a second term of his presidency. The NDA had a slender majority in the electoral college. Narayanan offered to be a consensus candidate. Opposition parties (including the Congress, the Left Front, Janata Dal (Secular), and various regional parties) supported a second term for him, and Sonia Gandhi met him to request his candidature; Vajpayee then met Narayanan, informed him that there was no consensus within the NDA on the question, and advised against his candidature. The NDA then proposed to elevate the vice-president, Krishan Kant, as a consensus; this drew support from the opposition and an agreement to this effect was conveyed by Vajpayee's representative to the Congress. However, within a day, the NDA unable to reach an internal consensus, decided to propose another candidate P. C. Alexander. Alexander's candidature drew disapproval of the opposition. The opposition parties approached Narayanan and renewed their request to seek a second term. The NDA then put forth a third candidate A P J Abdul Kalam as their official choice, without seeking consensus; one opposition party (the Samajwadi Party under Mulayam Singh Yadav) dissipated the unity of the Opposition by supporting this proposal. Narayanan opted himself out from a contest at this point.

When asked about these events later, Narayanan accused the BJP of scuttling a second term of his presidency.

In his farewell address to the nation (24 July 2002), K. R. Narayanan set his hopes for social action and progress on the service of the nation by its youth. He reflected on his varied experiences of the essential goodness and wisdom of the Indian people, recalling how he had grown up in Uzhavoor among adherents of several religions, how religious tolerance and harmony had prevailed, how upper-caste Hindus and well-off Christians had helped him in his early studies, and how upper-caste Hindus as well as Christians and Muslims had worked together enthusiastically for his election campaigns in Ottapalam. He said that the credibility and endurance of India's unity and democracy are founded on its tradition of tolerance, and spoke of the need for Hindus, who form the majority, to express the traditional spirit of their religion.

Reflecting on his presidency, K. R. Narayanan said:

As the President of India, I had lots of experiences that were full of pain and helplessness. There were occasions when I could do nothing for people and for the nation. These experiences have pained me a lot. They have depressed me a lot. I have agonised because of the limitations of power. Power and the helplessness surrounding it are a peculiar tragedy, in fact.

He was the also the first president addressed the state assembly.

== Subsequent life ==
After his retirement as president, K. R. Narayanan, along with his wife Usha, lived his remaining years in a central Delhi bungalow (on 34 Prithviraj Road).

At the World Social Forum (WSF) in Mumbai (21 January 2004), he lent his support to the alternative globalisation movement. Addressing the forum at its concluding session, he praised the WSF for demanding freedom in its most comprehensive form, and was happy that people had assembled under an important idea, rather than for narrow political ends; after reflecting on corporations displacing governments in various countries, and on how Mahatma Gandhi had fought British colonisers non-violently with the strength of the masses, he predicted that vocal masses the world over would successfully fight by non-violent means the capturing of the world's resources by a few corporations in the name of globalisation. He urged the people to struggle against power corporates and militarism and fight those aspects of globalisation which were against the interests of the people; he hailed people's power as a renascent factor of international politics.

K. R. Narayanan dedicated (15 February 2005) his tharavaadu at Uzhavoor to the Santhigiri Ashram in Pothencode for the purpose of establishing the Navajyothisree Karunakara Guru research centre for Siddha and Ayurveda. This turned out to be his last return to Uzhavoor.

K. R. Narayanan died on 9 November 2005 aged 85 at the Army Research and Referral Hospital, New Delhi, after being briefly ill with pneumonia and consequent renal failure. He was cremated with full state honors at sunset the following day, according to Hindu rites, which took place in Karma Bhumi near Rajghat, New Delhi. Every year on his death anniversary respects are paid at this Samadhi. The last rites were performed by his nephew P. V. Ramachandran, at Ekta sthal on the banks of the River Yamuna (adjacent to Shanti van, the memorial of his mentor Jawaharlal Nehru). Part of the urns containing the ashes were by taken by train to Haridwar where they were immersed in the Ganga by the eldest daughter in the presence of the Hindu pandit who performed the ceremony according to Hindu rites. The second part of the urns were accompanied by the younger daughter and taken to Kerala where the State Government arranged the procession to the Bharathapuzha river, a sacred river of Kerala.

Four siblings, K. R. Gowri, K. R. Bhargavi, K. R. Bharathi, and K. R. Bhaskaran, survived him; two elder brothers had died when Narayanan was in his twenties. His elder sister Gowri (a homoeopath, who remained unmarried) and his younger brother Bhaskaran (a teacher, also unmarried) had been living in Uzhavoor. Villagers of Uzhavoor marched silently to the tharavaadu of K. R. Narayanan and paid him reverent homage.

From the sidelines of society

About his life and its message, K. R. Narayanan said:

I see and understand both the symbolic as well as the substantive elements of my life. Sometimes I visualise it as a journey of an individual from a remote village on the sidelines of society to the hub of social standing. But at the same time I also realise that my life encapsulates the ability of the democratic system to accommodate and empower marginalised sections of society.

== Honours ==
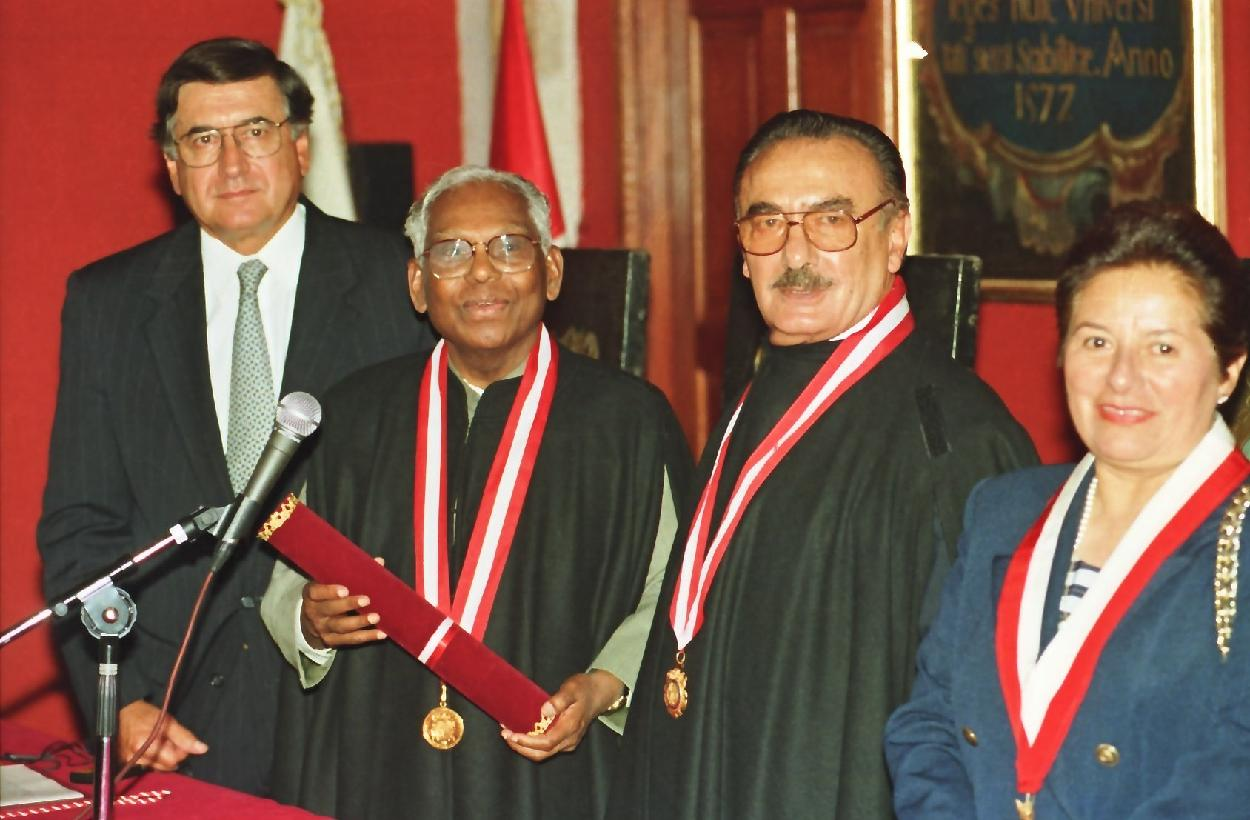
The President of India, Shri K R Narayanan being awarded an honorary doctorate by the National University of San Marcos, Lima, Peru

- Narayanan received honorary degrees from several universities, including the University of Toledo and National University of San Marcos.
- Narayanan also received the 1998 World Statesman Award.

== The K. R. Narayanan Foundation ==
The K. R. Narayanan Foundation (K.R.N.F) founded in December 2005, aims at propagating the ideals and perpetuating the memory of K. R. Narayanan. K.R.N.F is a mission of collective action to provide better future to the most vulnerable sections of Kerala Society – women, children, disabled persons, the aged and other disadvantaged groups – by providing educational training, protecting their health and environment, improving their living conditions and strengthening their family and community. The paradigms of K.R.N.F revolves around five crucial elements:

- research and development on science and technology for the dissemination of eco-friendly rural technology to the poor
- human resource development
- attitudinal change and self-management
- economic empowerment to the poor.

The Foundation is to identify and honour the best in areas of national importance like Integrity in Public Life, Journalism, Civil Service, Medical Science, Social Service, Literature, Sports, Entertainment, Politics etc.

K.R.N.F is also producing a documentary (both in Malayalam and English) on the life of K. R. Narayanan, entitled The Footprints Of Survival, aimed at propagating the ideals and perpetuating the memory of K.R.Narayanan. This documentary will be directed by Mr. Sunny Joseph, a senior journalist. The script will be based on a biography of the late president written by Eby J. Jose, who is also the General Secretary of the K.R.N.F. The Foundation has planned to distribute DVD copies of the creative work to all schools, colleges and public libraries.

The Foundation General Secretary Eby J. Jose has written a biography of the late president titled K. R. Narayanan Bharathathinte Suryathejassu. It is written in Malayalam, the mother tongue of K. R. Narayanan. This book traces the not-so-rosy life of the first Dalit president of India.

== In popular culture ==
The Films Division of India produced a feature length documentary film, titled K. R. Narayanan, directed by Suresh Menon it narrates the life of India's first Dalit president.

Political offices
Preceded by Shankar Dayal Sharma	Vice-President of India; 1992–1997	Succeeded by Krishan Kant
Preceded by Shankar Dayal Sharma	President of India; 1997–2002	Succeeded by Abdul Kalam
