= Rajgarh, Rajasthan Assembly constituency =

Former legislative assembly constituency of Rajasthan

Coordinates: 28.64°N 75.38°E

Rajgarh
- Former constituency for the Rajasthan Legislative Assembly

Constituency details
- Country: India
- Region: North India
- State: Rajasthan
- Established: 1962
- Abolished: 2008
- Reservation: None

Rajgarh (राजगढ़) Vidhan Sabha seat was one of the seats in Rajasthan Legislative Assembly in India. It became defunct in 2008 when electoral map of India was redrawn.

== Members of Vidhan Sabha ==
- 1962 : Hari Kishan (INC)
- 2003 : Samarth Lal (BJP)
- 2008 onwards : Seat does not exist. See : Rajgarh Laxmangarh (Vidhan Sabha constituency)

== Election results ==
=== 1962 Vidhan Sabha ===
- Hari Kishan (INC) : 14,124 votes
- Bharat Lal (IND) : 12,836

=== 2003 Vidhan Sabha ===
- Samarth Lal (BJP) : 36,903 votes
- Johri Lal (INC) : 28,224

== See also ==
- Rajgarh (disambiguation)
- Rajgarh District (राजगढ़ / राजगढ)
- Rajgarh, Madhya Pradesh
- Rajgarh, Rajasthan
