= Girish Bhandari =

Indian politician

Member of the Madhya Pradesh Legislative Assembly
- Incumbent
- Assumed office 2013
- Preceded by: Mohan Sharma
- Constituency: Narsinghgarh

Personal details
- Born: 30 January 1965 (age 61) Narsinghgarh, Rajgarh district
- Party: Indian National Congress
- Spouse: Jaya Bhandari
- Education: BCom
- Profession: Politician
- As of 13 June, 2018 Source: ["Biography:Bhandari, Girish" (PDF). Madhya Pradesh Legislative Assembly.]

Girish Bhandari is an Indian politician and a member of the Indian National Congress party.

== Political career ==
He became an MLA in 2013 Madhya Pradesh Legislative Assembly election.

== Personal life ==
He is married to Jaya Bhandari and has a son and a daughter.

== See also ==
- Madhya Pradesh Legislative Assembly
- 2013 Madhya Pradesh Legislative Assembly election
