= Gotam Tetwal =

Indian politician

Gautam Tetwal

Minister of State (I/C), Government of Madhya Pradesh
- Incumbent
- Assumed office 25 December 2023
- Chief Minister: Mohan Yadav
- Constituency: Sarangpur

Member of the Madhya Pradesh Legislative Assembly
- Incumbent
- Assumed office 2023
- Preceded by: Kunwarji Kothar
- Constituency: Sarangpur
- In office 2008–2013
- Preceded by: Amar Singh Kothar
- Succeeded by: Kunwarji Kothar
- Constituency: Sarangpur

Gotam Tetwal is an Indian politician from Madhya Pradesh. He is a two time elected member of the Madhya Pradesh Legislative Assembly from 2008 and 2023, representing Sarangpur Assembly constituency as a Member of the Bharatiya Janata Party.

== See also ==
- List of chief ministers of Madhya Pradesh
- Madhya Pradesh Legislative Assembly
