= Bhopal Conference =

The Bhopal Conference was held at Bhopal in the Hindi Belt state of Madhya Pradesh, India, on 12–13 January 2002. Its purpose was to address issues relating to improvement in the circumstances of the economically- and socially-deprived Dalit and Tribal communities of the state. The immediate outcome was the Bhopal Declaration which included a Dalit Agenda that has been described by Sudha Pai as "... a new effort to address the problems faced by Dalits and Tribals in keeping with liberalisation and the emergence of a competitive market economy." The results significantly influenced the policies of the then Chief Minister, Digvijay Singh, and caused the state to experience a markedly different style of Dalit politics to that which was typical in the neighbouring Belt areas, such as Bihar and Uttar Pradesh.

== Background ==
There were many expert attendees of the Conference, which was held in the Vidhan Sabha building of Bhopal, the state capital of Madhya Pradesh, and was organised by the state government. A key aim, as set out in the pre-Conference working note known as the Bhopal Document, was to examine how to uplift Dalit people by recourse to new ways of thinking that relied less on the prevailing concept of job reservation as a remedy for socio-economic depression. That concept had been promoted by B. R. Ambedkar and other Dalit intellectuals around the period when India became an independent nation and it was reliant upon a Marxist-based model of government economic intervention with a large public sector that, by the 1990s, was not sustainable and was being replaced by neoliberalism. Modern Dalit intellectual activists — notably, the journalist Chandra Bhan Prasad — had realised this and were campaigning for a strategy of "Dalit capitalism" that extended the requirement to reserve jobs into the private sector and also sought to empower Dalits by promoting an environment that would enable them to be business owners rather than reliant on others for employment. While some Dalits were already non-reliant because of their involvement in traditional occupations such as toddy tapping, those roles were under threat from globalisation. (Note: Kancha Ilaiah, a Dalit activist, had noted how the effects of globalisation were impacting on traditional Dalit occupations when he pointed to the use of slogans such as "down with Coca-Cola, up with coconut-water" and "down with toothpaste, up with neem stick.")

== Outcome ==
The Declaration that was agreed by the Conference proposed that the state "democratise capital" by allocating funds for the Dalit and Tribal communities that would enable them to invest both in developing their skills and their opportunities to enter the free market economy. It wanted compulsory, free education and a rearrangement of land ownership so that families had sufficient for sustainable cultivation. Furthermore, it appealed for both the public and the private sector to embrace the concepts of "Supplier Diversity" and "Dealership Diversity" that would ensure a market for the output of Dalit capitalism. Other aspects included a desire to see the job reservation scheme extended to encompass the Indian judiciary, an end to manual scavenging, a full application in spirit as well as law of the 1989 Scheduled Caste and Scheduled Tribe (Prevention of Atrocities) Act, and recognition of the particular problems faced by women of the Scheduled Castes and Tribes.

The 21 points that formed the Declaration were subsequently examined in more detail by specialist committees that were established for that purpose. Their remit was to propose strategies based upon the principles that had been declared. Those proposals were submitted to the Government of Madhya Pradesh, which accepted them on the first anniversary of the Conference in 2003.

Recent research shows that Dalit entrepreneurs have benefited from the Bhopal Conference, as it offered them opportunities to establish businesses, mainly through reservations in public procurement.

== Recognition ==
The principles contained in the Declaration had already been acknowledged by K. R. Narayan, then President of India and himself a Dalit, in his official Address to the Nation on the eve of Republic Day, 25 January 2002, when he said

[The Declaration was] charting out a new course for Dalits and the tribal people for the 21st century. After calling for the implementation of the policies enshrined in our Constitution for their development, the Declaration emphasizes the importance, in this present era of privatisation, of providing for representation for these deprived classes, not only in Government and public institutions but in private corporations and enterprises which benefit from Government funds and facilities. Indeed in the present economic system and of the future, it is necessary for the private sector to adopt social policies that are progressive and more egalitarian for these deprived classes to be uplifted from their state of deprivation and inequality and given the rights of citizens and civilized human beings. This is not to ask the private enterprise accept Socialism, but to do something like what the Diversity Bill and the affirmative action that a capitalist country like the United States of America has adopted and is implementing.
