= Mohan Sharma (politician) =

Indian politician

Member of Madhya Pradesh Legislative Assembly
- In office 2003–2013
- Preceded by: Dhul Singh Yadav
- Constituency: Narsinghgarh
- Incumbent
- Assumed office 2023
- Preceded by: Rajyavardhan Singh
- Constituency: Narsinghgarh

Personal details
- Party: Bharatiya Janata Party
- Profession: Politician

Mohan Sharma is an Indian politician from Madhya Pradesh. He is a three-time elected Member of the Madhya Pradesh Legislative Assembly from 2003, 2008, and 2023, representing Narsinghgarh Assembly constituency as a Member of the Bharatiya Janata Party.

== See also ==
- List of chief ministers of Madhya Pradesh
- Madhya Pradesh Legislative Assembly
