= Bhanwarlal Jivan =

Indian politician

- Constituency: Narsinghgarh Vidhan Sabha

Bhanwarlal Jivan was an Indian politician from the state of the Madhya Pradesh. He represented Narsinghgarh Vidhan Sabha constituency in Madhya Pradesh Legislative Assembly by winning General election of 1957.
