= Amar Singh Yadav =

Indian politician

Member of the Madhya Pradesh Legislative Assembly
- In office 2013–2018
- Preceded by: Hemraj Kalponi
- Succeeded by: Bapu Singh Tanwar
- Constituency: Rajgarh

Personal details
- Party: Bharatiya Janata Party

Amar Singh Yadav is an Indian politician of Bharatiya Janata Party and a member of the Madhya Pradesh Legislative Assembly from Rajgarh constituency. In 2018 Madhya Pradesh Legislative Assembly election Yadav lost to Bapu Singh Tanwar.
