= Jaivardhan Singh =

Indian politician

Minister of Urban Development and Housing Government of Madhya Pradesh
- In office 25 December 2018 – 23 March 2020
- Chief Minister: Kamal Nath
- Preceded by: Maya Singh
- Succeeded by: Bhupendra Singh

Member of the Madhya Pradesh Legislative Assembly
- Incumbent
- Assumed office 8 December 2013
- Preceded by: Mool Singh, INC
- Constituency: Raghogarh

Personal details
- Born: 9 July 1986 (age 40) Delhi, India
- Citizenship: Indian
- Party: Indian National Congress
- Spouse: Sreejamya Singh
- Children: 1
- Parents: Digvijaya Singh (father); Asha Digvijay Singh (mother)
- Education: B.Com Honors, M.P.A.
- Alma mater: Shri Ram College of Commerce, New Delhi, Columbia University, The Doon School
- Profession: Politician

Jaivardhan Digvijaya Singh (born 9 July 1986) is an Indian politician and a prominent leader of the Indian National Congress in Madhya Pradesh. He has been a Member of the Madhya Pradesh Legislative Assembly (MLA) for Raghogarh since 2013 and served as the Minister of Urban Development and Housing in the Government of Madhya Pradesh from 2018 to 2020. He is the son of Digvijaya Singh, a former Chief Minister of Madhya Pradesh.

== Early life and education ==
Jaivardhan Singh was born on 9 July 1986 in New Delhi, India, to Digvijaya Singh and Asha Devi. He completed his schooling at The Doon School, Dehradun, and graduated with a B.Com (Honours) degree from Shri Ram College of Commerce, University of Delhi. He later pursued a Master of in Public Administration (Development Practice) at the School of International and Public Affairs, Columbia University, New York.

== Political career ==
Jaivardhan Singh entered politics in 2013, contesting the Raghogarh constituency in the Madhya Pradesh Legislative Election, 2013. He won with a margin of over 59,000 votes, the highest among Indian National Congress candidates in the state that year, securing the seat previously held by his father, Digvijaya Singh. He was re-elected in the 2018 election and appointed as the Minister of Urban Development and Housing in the Kamal Nath ministry from 25 December 2018 until the government's collapse on 23 March 2020.

At the age of 32, Singh became the youngest cabinet minister in Madhya Pradesh's history during his tenure. He has been actively involved in strengthening the Congress party's presence in Madhya Pradesh, focusing on youth engagement and grassroots organization. In the 2023 election, he retained the Raghogarh seat, continuing his family's political legacy in the constituency.

== Achievements ==
- As the Minister of Urban Development and Housing, Jaivardhan Singh under the guidance of then Chief Minister Kamal Nath, facilitated a scheme in Madhya Pradesh to distribute e-rickshaws to 250 unemployed women in Indore city, promoting economic empowerment and sustainable transport. The initiative, launched in 2019, aimed to provide livelihood opportunities and was implemented through the urban development department.
- During his tenure as Minister, Singh played a key role in advancing urban infrastructure by overseeing the signing of a Memorandum of Understanding (MoU) between the Madhya Pradesh government and the central government in 2019 for the Bhopal and Indore Metro Rail projects, enhancing public transportation in the state.
- Jaivardhan Singh was honored with the Best MLA Award in recognition of his exemplary contributions as a legislator in Madhya Pradesh, reflecting his dedication to public service and effective representation of the Raghogarh constituency.

== Personal life ==
Jaivardhan Singh is married to Srijamya Shahi, a descendant of the Dumaria royal family from West Champaran, Bihar. The couple has one child. Singh is known for his interest in public policy and sustainable development, influenced by his academic background. He has also been featured in many articles for his personality and royal lineage.
