= Balbhadra Singh =

Indian politician

Raja Balbhadra Singh MLA
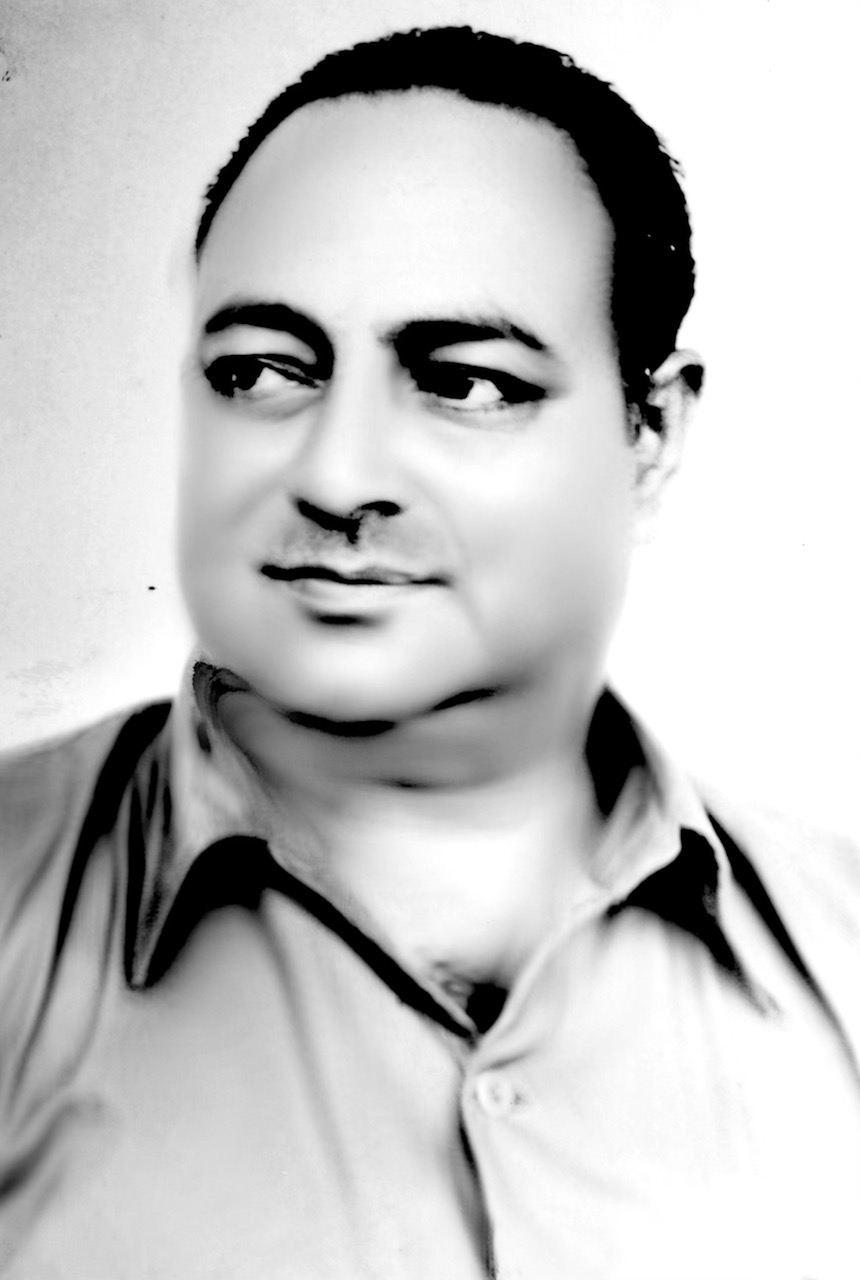
- Raja Balbhadra Singh of Raghogarh

Member of the Madhya Pradesh Legislative Assembly
- In office 1952–1957
- Succeeded by: Dulichand
- Constituency: Raghogarh

Personal details
- Born: April 16, 1916
- Died: 1967 (aged 50 or 51)
- Party: Independent
- Profession: Politician and Raja of Raghogarh

Balbhadra Singh (April 16, 1916 – 1967) was the 12th ruler of the former princely state of Raghogarh in the present-day Guna district of Madhya Pradesh, India, and a former elected member of the legislative assembly. He became a Member of the Legislative Assembly (MLA) as independent candidate for the Raghogarh Vidhan Sabha constituency. He was a member of the Indian National Congress till 1947 but remained independent thereafter till his death in 1967.

Balbhadra Singh was the father of two politician sons, Digvijaya Singh and Lakshman Singh.
