= Sarangpur Assembly constituency =

Constituency of the Madhya Pradesh legislative assembly in India

Coordinates: 23.57°N 76.47°E

Sarangpur
- Constituency No. 164 for the Madhya Pradesh Legislative Assembly

Constituency details
- Country: India
- Region: Central India
- State: Madhya Pradesh
- District: Rajgarh
- Lok Sabha constituency: Rajgarh
- Established: 1962
- Reservation: SC

Member of Legislative Assembly
- 16th Madhya Pradesh Legislative Assembly
- Incumbent Gotam Tetwal
- Party: Bharatiya Janata Party
- Elected year: 2023
- Preceded by: Kunwarji Kothar

Sarangpur is one of the 230 Vidhan Sabha (Legislative Assembly) constituencies of Madhya Pradesh state in central India.

It is part of Rajgarh district.

== Members of the Legislative Assembly ==
Year	Member	Party
1962	Gangram Jatav	Bharatiya Jana Sangh
1967	Gangram Jatav	Bharatiya Jana Sangh
1972	Sajjan Singh Vishnar	Indian National Congress
1977	Amar Singh Motilal	Independent
1980	Amar Singh Kothar	Bharatiya Janata Party
1985	Hajari Lal	Indian National Congress
1990	Amar Singh	Bharatiya Janata Party
1993	Amar Singh	Bharatiya Janata Party
1998	Krishna Mohan Malviya	Indian National Congress
2003	Amar Singh Kothar	Bharatiya Janata Party
2008	Gautam Tetwal	Bharatiya Janata Party
2013	Kunwarji Kothar	Bharatiya Janata Party
2018	Kunwarji Kothar	Bharatiya Janata Party
2023	Gautam Tetwal	Bharatiya Janata Party

== Election results ==
=== 2023 ===
2023 Madhya Pradesh Legislative Assembly election: Sarangpur
Party	Candidate	Votes	%	±%
BJP	Gotam Tetwal	97,095	55.5	+5.91
INC	Kala-Mahesh Malviya	74,041	42.32	−4.37
BSP	Dev Verma	1,964	1.12	−0.2
NOTA	None of the above	1,127	0.64	−0.41
Majority		23,054	13.18	+10.28
Turnout		174,950	84.82	+2.49
BJP hold		Swing		

=== 2018 ===
2018 Madhya Pradesh Legislative Assembly election: Sarangpur
Party	Candidate	Votes	%	±%
BJP	Kunwarji Kothar	75,005	49.59	
INC	Kala Mahesh Malviya	70,624	46.69	
BSP	Durgesh Ahirwar	1,999	1.32	
NOTA	None of the above	1,590	1.05	
Majority		4,381	2.9	
Turnout		151,248	82.33	
BJP gain from		Swing		

== See also ==
- Sarangpur, Madhya Pradesh
