= Rodmal Nagar =

Indian politician

Member of Parliament, Lok Sabha
- Incumbent
- Assumed office May 2014
- Preceded by: Narayan Singh Amlabe
- Constituency: Rajgarh

Personal details
- Born: 15 December 1960 (age 65) Raypuria, Rajgarh, Madhya Pradesh
- Party: Bharatiya Janata Party
- Spouse: Kamla Nagar
- Children: 2 Sons, 1 Daughter
- Parent(s): Bapulal Ji, Chhamee Bai
- Education: Vikram University
- Occupation: Politician

Rodmal Nagar (Hindi pronunciation: [ɾoːɖməl naːgəɾ]) is a member of the Bharatiya Janata Party and has won the 2014 and 2019 Indian general elections from the Rajgarh constituency. His net worth is approximately ₹3.61 crores.

== Political career ==
He became a member of parliament from Rajgarh Lok Sabha constituency in 2014. Earlier, this seat was held by Congress.

In the 2019 general election, he retained his seat, and became a member of parliament for a second term.

Nagar won the 2024 Lok Sabha Election and became Member of Parliament for a third consecutive term.
