= Susner Assembly constituency =

Constituency of the Madhya Pradesh legislative assembly in India

Coordinates: 23.94°N 76.10°E

Susner
- Constituency No. 165 for the Madhya Pradesh Legislative Assembly

Constituency details
- Country: India
- Region: Central India
- State: Madhya Pradesh
- District: Rajgarh
- Lok Sabha constituency: Rajgarh
- Established: 1957
- Reservation: None

Member of Legislative Assembly
- 16th Madhya Pradesh Legislative Assembly
- Incumbent Bhairon Singh
- Party: Indian National Congress
- Elected year: 2023
- Preceded by: Vikram Singh Rana

Susner is one of the 230 Vidhan Sabha (Legislative Assembly) constituencies of Madhya Pradesh state in central India.

It is part of Agar Malwa district. It comes under Malwa region. It forms a part of the border between Madhya Pradesh and Rajasthan.

== Members of the Legislative Assembly ==
=== Madhya Bharat Legislative Assembly ===
Election	Name	Party
1952	Rana Mal Singh	Indian National Congress

=== Madhya Pradesh Legislative Assembly ===
Election	Name	Party
1957	Hari Bhau	Bharatiya Jana Sangh
1962	Hari Bhau	Bharatiya Jana Sangh
1967	Shiv Lal	Bharatiya Jana Sangh
1972	Hari Bhau	Bharatiya Jana Sangh
1977	Hari Bhau	Janata Party
1980	Rana Natwar Singh	Indian National Congress
1985	Hari Bhau	Bharatiya Janata Party
1990	Badri Lal Soni	Bharatiya Janata Party
1993	Vallabhbhai Ambavatiya	Indian National Congress
1998	Vallabhbhai Ambavatiya	Indian National Congress
2003	Phoolchand Vaidia	Bharatiya Janata Party
2008	Santosh Joshi	Bharatiya Janata Party
2013	Murlidhar Patidar	Bharatiya Janata Party
2018	Vikaram Singh Rana	Independent
2023	Bhairon Singh	Indian National Congress

== Election results ==
=== 2023 ===
2023 Madhya Pradesh Legislative Assembly election: Susner
Party	Candidate	Votes	%	±%
INC	Bhairon Singh	97,584	48.27	+21.2
BJP	Vikram Singh Rana	84,939	42.02	+17.65
Independent	Jitu Patidar	12,632	6.25	
BSP	Naveen Mishra	2,838	1.4	−1.15
NOTA	None of the above	1,321	0.65	−0.93
Majority		12,645	6.25	−8.78
Turnout		202,154	85.93	+1.29
INC gain from Independent		Swing		

=== 2018 ===
2018 Madhya Pradesh Legislative Assembly election: Susner
Party	Candidate	Votes	%	±%
Independent	Vikaram Singh Rana Guddu Bhai	75,804	42.1	
INC	Mahendra Bhairu Singh Bapu	48,742	27.07	
BJP	Murlidhar Patidar	43,880	24.37	
BSP	Phool Chand Malviya	4,598	2.55	
NOTA	None of the above	2,842	1.58	
Majority		27,062	15.03	
Turnout		180,068	84.64	
Independent gain from BJP		Swing		

== See also ==
Susner
