= Radhavallabh Vijayvargiya =

Indian politician

Member of the Madhya Pradesh Legislative Assembly
- In office 1957–1962
- Succeeded by: Bhanuprakash Singh
- Constituency: Narsinghgarh

Vijayvargiya was an Indian politician from the state of the Madhya Pradesh. He represented Narsinghgarh Vidhan Sabha constituency in Madhya Pradesh Legislative Assembly by winning General election of 1957.
