= Rajgarh Assembly constituency =

Constituency of the Madhya Pradesh legislative assembly in India

Coordinates: 24.01°N 76.73°E

Rajgarh
- Constituency No. 162 for the Madhya Pradesh Legislative Assembly

Constituency details
- Country: India
- Region: Central India
- State: Madhya Pradesh
- District: Rajgarh
- Lok Sabha constituency: Rajgarh
- Established: 1957
- Reservation: None

Member of Legislative Assembly
- 16th Madhya Pradesh Legislative Assembly
- Incumbent Amar Singh Yadav
- Party: Bharatiya Janata Party
- Elected year: 2023
- Preceded by: Bapu Singh Tanwar

Rajgarh (राजगढ़) Vidhan Sabha seat is one of the seats in Madhya Pradesh Legislative Assembly in India. It is a segment of Rajgarh Lok Sabha seat. It is part of Rajgarh district.

== Members of the Legislative Assembly ==
=== Madhya Bharat Legislative Assembly ===
Election	Name	Party
1952	Pratibha Devi	Indian National Congress

=== Madhya Pradesh Legislative Assembly ===
Election	Name	Party
1957	Ram Kumar	Praja Socialist Party
1962	Shivprasad Satyendra Khujneri	Independent
1967	Bijesh Singh	Indian National Congress
1972	Gulab Singh	Indian National Congress
1977	Jamnalal Bhanwarlal	Janata Party
1980	Gupta Jamnalal	Bharatiya Janata Party
1985	Gulab Singh Sustani	Indian National Congress
1990	Raghunandan Sharma	Bharatiya Janata Party
1993	Raghunandan Sharma	Bharatiya Janata Party
1998	Pratap Singh Mandloi	Indian National Congress
2003	Pandit Hari Charan Tiwari	Bharatiya Janata Party
2008	Hemraj Kalponi	Indian National Congress
2013	Amar Singh Yadav	Bharatiya Janata Party
2018	Bapu Singh Tanwar	Indian National Congress
2023	Amar Singh Yadav	Bharatiya Janata Party

== Election results ==
=== 2023 ===
2023 Madhya Pradesh Legislative Assembly election: Rajgarh
Party	Candidate	Votes	%	±%
BJP	Amar Singh Yadav	104,032	53.53	+24.41
INC	Bapu Singh Tanwar	81,493	41.93	−5.09
ASP(KR)	Satish Kumar Bhartiya	1,944	1.0	
NOTA	None of the above	1,742	0.9	−0.02
Majority		22,539	11.6	−6.3
Turnout		194,347	84.0	−1.54
BJP gain from INC		Swing		

=== 2018 ===
2018 Madhya Pradesh Legislative Assembly election: Rajgarh
Party	Candidate	Votes	%	±%
INC	Bapusingh Tanwar	81,921	47.02	
BJP	Amar Singh Yadav	50,738	29.12	
Independent	Pratap Singh Mandloi	33,494	19.22	
AAP	Gordhansingh Tawar	2,125	1.22	
NOTA	None of the above	1,608	0.92	
Majority		31,183	17.9	
Turnout		174,231	85.54	
INC gain from		Swing		

== See also ==
- Rajgarh District
