= Narsinghgarh Assembly constituency =

Constituency of the Madhya Pradesh legislative assembly in India

Coordinates: 23.71°N 77.09°E

Narsinghgarh
- Constituency No. 160 for the Madhya Pradesh Legislative Assembly

Constituency details
- Country: India
- Region: Central India
- State: Madhya Pradesh
- District: Rajgarh
- Lok Sabha constituency: Rajgarh
- Established: 1957
- Total electors: 211,452
- Reservation: None

Member of Legislative Assembly
- 16th Madhya Pradesh Legislative Assembly
- Incumbent Mohan Sharma
- Party: Bharatiya Janata Party
- Elected year: 2023
- Preceded by: Rajyavardhan Singh

Narsinghgarh Assembly constituency is one of the 230 Vidhan Sabha (Legislative Assembly) constituencies of Madhya Pradesh state in central India.

It is part of Rajgarh district.

== Members of Legislative Assembly ==
=== Madhya Bharat Legislative Assembly ===
Election	Name	Party
1952	Radhavallabh Vijayvargiya	Indian National Congress
1952	Bhanwarlal Jivan	Indian National Congress

=== Madhya Pradesh Legislative Assembly ===
Election	Member	Party
1957	Bhanwarlal Jivan	Indian National Congress
1957	Radhavallabh Vijayvargiya	Indian National Congress
1962	Bhanuprakash Singh	Independent
1967	Krishnamohan	Bharatiya Jana Sangh
1972	Mangi Lal Bhandari	Indian National Congress
1977	Siddumal Dhallumal	Janata Party
1980	Siddumal Dhallumal	Bharatiya Janata Party
1985	Rajya Vardhan Singh	Indian National Congress
1990	Hanuman Prasad Garg	Bharatiya Janata Party
1993	Mangilal Bhandari	Indian National Congress
1998	Dhul Singh Yadav	Indian National Congress
2003	Mohan Sharma	Bharatiya Janata Party
2008	Mohan Sharma	Bharatiya Janata Party
2013	Girish Bhandari	Indian National Congress
2018	Rajyavardhan Singh	Bharatiya Janata Party
2023	Mohan Sharma	Bharatiya Janata Party

== Election results ==
=== 2023 ===
2023 Madhya Pradesh Legislative Assembly election: Narsinghgarh
Party	Candidate	Votes	%	±%
BJP	Mohan Sharma	113,084	56.29	+6.65
INC	Girish Bhandari	81,169	40.4	−3.7
NOTA	None of the above	1,088	0.54	−0.38
Majority		31,915	15.89	+10.35
Turnout		200,891	83.94	+3.5
BJP hold		Swing		

=== 2018 ===
2018 Madhya Pradesh Legislative Assembly election: Narsinghgarh
Party	Candidate	Votes	%	±%
BJP	Rajyavardhan Singh	85,335	49.64	
INC	Girish Bhandari	75,801	44.1	
Independent	Pankaj Yadav	3,459	2.01	
BSP	Dr. Shivnarayan Verma	2,605	1.52	
NOTA	None of the above	1,581	0.92	
Majority		9,534	5.54	
Turnout		171,897	80.44	
BJP gain from INC		Swing		

=== 2013 ===
2013 Madhya Pradesh Legislative Assembly election: Narsinghgarh
Party	Candidate	Votes	%	±%
INC	Girish Bhandari	85,847	54.87	
BJP	Mohan Sharma	62829	40.16	
BSP	Munna Bhai	2081	1.33	N/A
Independent (politician)	Mohan Dada	1297	0.83	
Independent	Girish	1288	0.82	
Independent	Mohan Sharma	875	0.56	
Independent	Neeraj Yadav	577	0.37	
NOTA	None of the Above	1669	1.07	
Majority				
Turnout		156463	80.18	
Swing to INC from BJP		Swing		

== See also ==
- Narsinghgarh, Rajgarh
