= Amlabe =

Village in Madhya Pradesh, India

Coordinates: 24°05′N 76°19′E

Amlabe (also known as Amlabey) is a village in the Jirapur Tehsil of Rajgarh District in the state of Madhya Pradesh in central India. The village population is approximately 1,850 residents and the number of households is around 465.

As per the 2001 Indian Census, the Location code or village code of Amlabe village is 478726. and its Postal Index Number is 465693.
