= Rajgarh, Dhar =

Rajgarh
- Town
- Location in Madhya Pradesh, India Rajgarh (India)
- Coordinates: 22.68°N 74.95°E
- Country: India
- State: Madhya Pradesh
- District: Dhar
- Elevation: 491 m (1,611 ft)

Population (2015)
  - Total: 40,000

Languages
  - Official: Hindi
- Time zone: UTC+5:30 (IST)
- ISO 3166 code: IN-MP
- Vehicle registration: MP

Rajgarh is a town and a nagar panchay, near city of Dhar in Dhar district in the Indian state of Madhya Pradesh.

== Demographics ==
As of 2001 India census, Rajgarh had a population of 15,610. Males constitute 51% of the population and females 49%. Rajgarh has an average literacy rate of 63%, higher than the national average of 59.5%: male literacy is 72%, and female literacy is 55%. In Rajgarh, 16% of the population is under 6 years of age. In the north side of town a small killa is there. A beautiful mandir (temple) of nagneshwari devi. (kuldevi of Rathore rajput's) situated. Mohankheda (Jain tirth) is also situated near rajgarh.

== History ==
Rajgarh is a guaranteed bhumiat of Dhar. The bhumia of Rajgarh holds one village and three Bhil hamlets from Dhar, two villages directly from the British government, and two other villages from Indore. In 1867, Indore and Dhar pressed their claims on the villages of Rajgarh and Dhar, but the Government of India decided that the bhumia should enjoy complete authority in those villages.

In 1886 and 1903, the Government of India recognised the right of the government of Dhar to exercise jurisdiction in the guaranteed thakurats and bhumiats subordinate to it. Upon this right being recognised, the government of Dhar conceded limited civil and criminal jurisdictional powers to the estate holders deemed capable of exercising them, Rajgarh included.
