= Raghunandan Sharma (Rajgarh) =

Indian politician

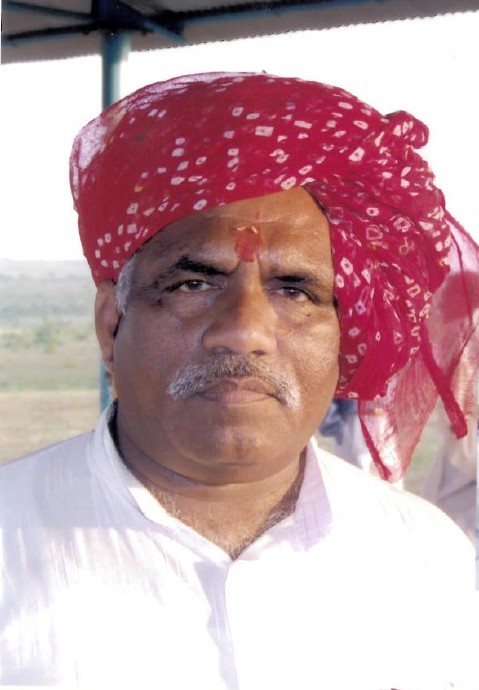

Raghunandan Sharma (Rajgarh) is a former Indian legislator. He was the member of the Legislative Assembly from Rajgarh, Madhya Pradesh. He is also a member of Bharatiya Janata Party's (BJP) national council and the Madhya Pradesh State BJP working committee. Sharma represented Rajgarh in the Madhya Pradesh Legislative Assembly for consecutive two terms, from 1990 to 1998.

== Childhood and education ==
Sharma was born in the village of Khujner in District Rajgarh on 19 January 1950. He was influenced by the ideologies of the Rashtriya Swayamsevak Sangh from an early age. He was the District College general secretary from Jansangh.

== Early youth and political career ==
After completing his BA and LLB, Sharma wanted to be a lawyer but, because of his poor economic background, he had to take a job as a clerk in the District Collectorate. In 1990, he joined politics and stood for election to the MLA on BJPs' ticket. He won this election with a margin of 19,000 votes. Elections were re-held in the state in 1993 after the revoking of the president's rule and Sharma won his second term by a margin of a mere 274 votes.

Sharma held various other positions such as state president of Gurjar Gaur Brahmin Sabha between 1990 and 1995, member of the state and national council of the BJP (2010 - 2013), district president of the BJP (2012 - 2015). From 2016 to 2018, he was appointed vice chairman (minister of state awarded) of the Khadi and Village Industries Board by the government of Madhya Pradesh.

harma is also owner and editor-in-chief of the monthly political magazine Nevaj.

== Social work ==
Sharma is part of various social organizations, religious trusts and NGOs. He started his own trust called Nirvindhya aiming to help make cleaning of rivers a social movement.

== Personal life ==
Sharma is married to Krishna Sharma. They have two sons and two daughters.
