= Raghunandan Sharma (Mandsaur) =

Indian politician

Raghunandan Sharma (born 7 April 1946 Sujaanpura, Mandsaur district) is a member of the Rajya Sabha from the Madhya Pradesh state of India. He is a leader of Bharatiya Janata Party.

== Personal life and education ==
Sharma was born on 7 April 1946 in the village of Sujaanpara in Mandsaur district, Madhya Pradesh to Gauri Shankar Sharma and Ram Sukhi Bai. He got his Master of Arts degree in Political Science at Vikram University, Ujjain.

He married Shanti Devi Sharma in 1966 and has two sons.

== Positions held ==
Sharma has held the following positions during his career as a legislator.

- 1977-1980 - Member, Madhya Pradesh Legislative Assembly
- April 2008 - Elected to Rajya Sabha
- May 2008 - May 2009 - Member, Committee on Chemicals and Fertilizers
- Aug. 2009 onwards - Member, Committee on Chemicals and Fertilizers
- May 2012 onwards - Committee on Official Language
- May 2008- Sept. 2009 - Member, Committee on Subordinate Legislation
- Aug. 2009 onwards - Member, Consultative Committee for the Ministry of Food Processing Industries
- May 2012 onwards - Member, Committee on Official Language
- Aug. 2012 onwards - Member, Committee on Chemicals and Fertilizers

== Current position ==
- July 2014 onwards - Honorary Advisor to the Bureau of Parliamentary Studies and Training (BPST), a wing of the Lok Sabha
