= List of by-elections to the Madhya Pradesh Legislative Assembly =

Indian state by-elections

The following is a list of by-elections held for the Madhya Pradesh Legislative Assembly, India, since its formation in 1956.

== 14th Assembly ==
=== 2014 ===
S.No	Date	Constituency	MLA before election	Party before election	Elected MLA	Party after election
1	24 April 2014	Vidisha	Shivraj Singh Chouhan	Bharatiya Janata Party	Kalyan Singh Thakur	Bharatiya Janata Party
2	21 August 2014	Bahoriband	Prabhat Pandey	Bharatiya Janata Party	Saurabh Singh	Indian National Congress
3	21 August 2014	Agar	Manohar Untwal	Bharatiya Janata Party	Gopal Parmar	Bharatiya Janata Party
4	21 August 2014	Vijayraghavgarh	Sanjay Pathak	Indian National Congress	Sanjay Pathak	Bharatiya Janata Party

=== 2015 ===
S.No	Date	Constituency	MLA before election	Party before election	Elected MLA	Party after election
1	27 June 2015	Garoth	Rajesh Yadav	Bharatiya Janata Party	Chander Singh Sisodia	Bharatiya Janata Party

=== 2016 ===
S.No	Date	Constituency	MLA before election	Party before election	Elected MLA	Party after election
1	13 February 2016	Maihar	Narayan Prasad	Indian National Congress	Narayan Tripathi	Bharatiya Janata Party
2	30 May 2016	Ghoradongri	Sajjan Singh Uikey	Bharatiya Janata Party	Mangal Singh Dhruve	Bharatiya Janata Party
3	19 November 2016	Nepanagar	Rajendra Shyamlal Dadu	Bharatiya Janata Party	Manju Rajendra Dadu	Bharatiya Janata Party

=== 2017 ===
S.No	Date	Constituency	MLA before election	Party before election	Elected MLA	Party after election
9	9 April 2017	Ater	Satyadev Katare	Indian National Congress	Hemant Katare	Indian National Congress
89	9 April 2017	Bandhavgarh	Gyan Singh	Bharatiya Janata Party	Shiv Narayan Singh	Bharatiya Janata Party
61	9 November 2017	Chitrakoot	Prem Singh	Indian National Congress	Neelanshu Chaturvedi	Indian National Congress

=== 2018 ===
S.No	Date	Constituency	MLA before election	Party before election	Elected MLA	Party after election
1	24 February 2018	Kolaras	Ram Singh Yadav	Indian National Congress	Mahendra Singh Yadav	Indian National Congress
2	24 February 2018	Mungaoli	Mahendra Singh Kalukheda	Indian National Congress	Brajendra Singh Yadav	Indian National Congress

== 15th Assembly ==
=== 2019 ===
S.No	Date	Constituency	MLA before election	Party before election	Elected MLA	Party after election
1	29 April 2019	Chhindwara	Deepak Saxena	Indian National Congress	Kamal Nath	Indian National Congress
2	21 October 2019	Jhabua	Guman Singh Damor	Bharatiya Janata Party	Kantilal Bhuria	Indian National Congress

=== 2020 ===
S.No	Date	Constituency	MLA before election	Party before election	Elected MLA	Party after election
1	3 November 2020	Joura	Banwari Lal Sharma	Indian National Congress	Subedar Singh Rajodha	Bharatiya Janata Party
2	3 November 2020	Sumaoli	Adal Singh Kansana	Indian National Congress	Ajab Singh Kushwah	Indian National Congress
3	3 November 2020	Morena	Raghuraj Singh Kansana	Indian National Congress	Rakesh Mavai	Indian National Congress
4	3 November 2020	Dimani	Girraj Dandotiya	Indian National Congress	Ravindra Singh Tomar Bhidosa	Indian National Congress
5	3 November 2020	Ambah	Kamlesh Jatav	Indian National Congress	Kamlesh Jatav	Bharatiya Janata Party
6	3 November 2020	Mehgaon	O. P. S. Bhadoria	Indian National Congress	O. P. S. Bhadoria	Bharatiya Janata Party
7	3 November 2020	Gohad	Ranvir Jatav	Indian National Congress	Mevaram Jatav	Indian National Congress
8	3 November 2020	Gwalior	Pradhumn Singh Tomar	Indian National Congress	Pradhumn Singh Tomar	Bharatiya Janata Party
9	3 November 2020	Gwalior East	Munnalal Goyal	Indian National Congress	Satish Sikarwar	Indian National Congress
10	3 November 2020	Dabra	Imarti Devi	Indian National Congress	Suresh Raje	Indian National Congress
11	3 November 2020	Bhander	Raksha Santram Saroniya	Indian National Congress	Raksha Santram Saroniya	Bharatiya Janata Party
12	3 November 2020	Karera	Jasmant Jatav	Indian National Congress	Pragilal Jatav	Indian National Congress
13	3 November 2020	Pohari	Suresh Dhakad	Indian National Congress	Suresh Dhakad	Bharatiya Janata Party
14	3 November 2020	Bamori	Mahendra Singh Sisodia	Indian National Congress	Mahendra Singh Sisodia	Bharatiya Janata Party
15	3 November 2020	Ashok Nagar	Jaipal Singh Jajji	Indian National Congress	Jaipal Singh Jajji	Bharatiya Janata Party
16	3 November 2020	Mungaoli	Brajendra Singh Yadav	Indian National Congress	Brajendra Singh Yadav	Bharatiya Janata Party
17	3 November 2020	Surkhi	Govind Singh Rajput	Indian National Congress	Govind Singh Rajput	Bharatiya Janata Party
18	3 November 2020	Malhara	Pradyuman Singh Lodhi	Indian National Congress	Pradyuman Singh Lodhi	Bharatiya Janata Party
19	3 November 2020	Anuppur	Bisahulal Singh	Indian National Congress	Bisahulal Singh	Bharatiya Janata Party
20	3 November 2020	Sanchi	Prabhuram Choudhary	Indian National Congress	Prabhuram Choudhary	Bharatiya Janata Party
21	3 November 2020	Biaora	Govardhan Dangi	Indian National Congress	Amlyahat Ramchandra Dangi	Indian National Congress
22	3 November 2020	Agar	Manohar Untwal	Bharatiya Janata Party	Vipin Wankhede	Indian National Congress
23	3 November 2020	Hatpipliya	Manoj Choudhary	Indian National Congress	Manoj Choudhary	Bharatiya Janata Party
24	3 November 2020	Mandhata	Narayan Patel	Indian National Congress	Narayan Patel	Bharatiya Janata Party
25	3 November 2020	Nepanagar	Sumitra Devi Kasdekar	Indian National Congress	Sumitra Devi Kasdekar	Bharatiya Janata Party
26	3 November 2020	Badnawar	Rajvardhan Singh	Indian National Congress	Rajvardhan Singh	Bharatiya Janata Party
27	3 November 2020	Sanwer	Tulsiram Silawat	Indian National Congress	Tulsiram Silawat	Bharatiya Janata Party
28	3 November 2020	Suwasra	Hardeep Singh Dang	Indian National Congress	Hardeep Singh Dang	Bharatiya Janata Party

=== 2021 ===
S.No	Date	Constituency	MLA before election	Party before election	Elected MLA	Party after election
55	17 April 2021	Damoh	Rahul Lodhi	Indian National Congress	Ajay Kumar Tandon	Indian National Congress
45	30 October 2021	Prithvipur	Brijendra Singh Rathore	Indian National Congress	Shishupal Yadav	Bharatiya Janata Party
62	30 October 2021	Raigaon	Jugal Kishore Bagri	Bharatiya Janata Party	Kalpana Verma	Indian National Congress
192	30 October 2021	Jobat	Kalawati Bhuria	Indian National Congress	Sulochana Rawat	Bharatiya Janata Party

== 16th Assembly ==
=== 2024 ===
Date	Constituency		Previous MLA		Reason	Elected MLA	Party
10 July 2024	123	Amarwara	Kamlesh Shah	Indian National Congress	Resigned on 29 March 2024	Kamlesh Shah	Bharatiya Janata Party
13 November 2024	2	Vijaypur	Ramnivas Rawat	Indian National Congress	Resigned on 8 July 2024	Mukesh Malhotra	Indian National Congress
13 November 2024	156	Budhni	Shivraj Singh Chouhan	Bharatiya Janata Party	Elected to Lok Sabha on 4 June	Ramakant Bhargava	Bharatiya Janata Party

=== 2026 ===
Date	Constituency		Previous MLA		Reason	Elected MLA	
30 July 2026	22	Datia	Rajendra Bharti	Indian National Congress	Disqualified on 2 April 2026	Kuwar Ghanshyam Singh	Indian National Congress
