= 2020 elections in India =

Elections in India
← 2019	2020	2021 →

Elections in India in 2020 included by-elections to the Lok Sabha, elections to the Rajya Sabha for 73 Seats, elections to state legislative assemblies of 3 states and numerous other by-elections to state legislative assemblies, councils and local bodies.

== Legislative assembly elections ==
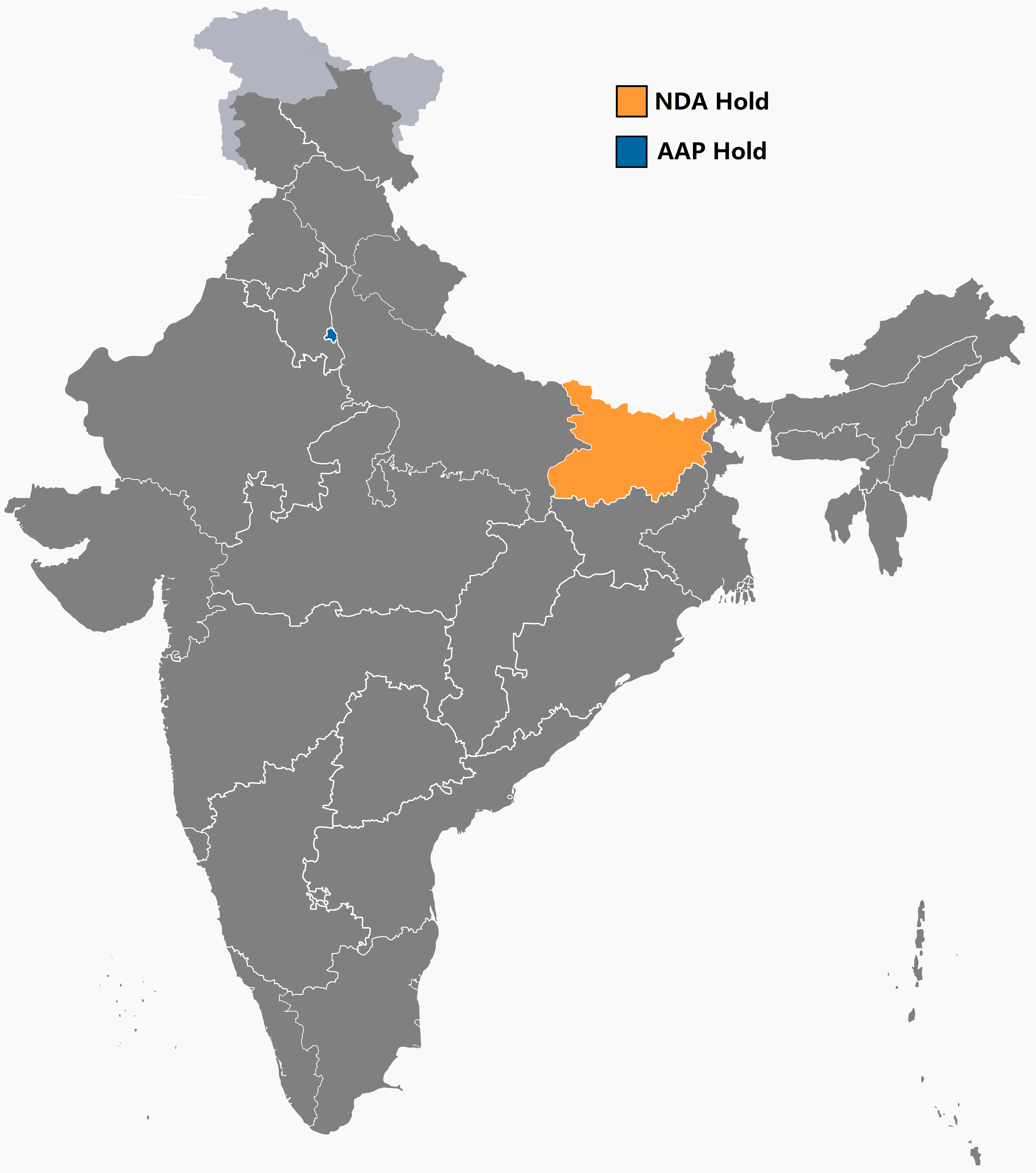
2020 Indian Election Result Map

Date(s)	State/UT	Government before	Chief Minister before election	Government after	Elected Chief Minister	Maps
8 February 2020	Delhi	Aam Aadmi Party	Arvind Kejriwal	Aam Aadmi Party	Arvind Kejriwal	
28 October 2020, 3 & 7 November 2020	Bihar	Janata Dal (United)	Nitish Kumar	Bharatiya Janata Party	Nitish Kumar	
28 October 2020, 3 & 7 November 2020	Bihar	Janata Dal (United)	Nitish Kumar	Janata Dal (United)	Nitish Kumar	
28 October 2020, 3 & 7 November 2020	Bihar	Bharatiya Janata Party	Nitish Kumar	Hindustani Awam Morcha	Nitish Kumar	
28 October 2020, 3 & 7 November 2020	Bihar	Bharatiya Janata Party	Nitish Kumar	Vikassheel Insaan Party	Nitish Kumar	

== Lok Sabha by-elections ==
S.No	Date	Constituency	State/UT	MP before election	Party before election	Elected MP	Party after election	Remarks
1	7 November 2020	Valmiki Nagar	Bihar	Baidyanath Prasad Mahto	Janata Dal (United)	Sunil Kumar	Janata Dal (United)	Death of Baidyanath Prasad Mahto

== Legislative Assembly by-elections ==
=== Chhattisgarh ===
S.No	Date	Constituency	MLA before election	Party before election	Elected MLA	Party after election
1	3 November 2020	Marwahi	Ajit Jogi	Janta Congress Chhattisgarh	Krishna Kumar Dhruw	Indian National Congress

=== Gujarat ===
S.No	Date	Constituency	MLA before election	Party before election	Elected MLA	Party after election
1	3 November 2020	Abdasa	Pradyumansinh Jadeja	Indian National Congress	Pradyumansinh Jadeja	Bharatiya Janata Party
2	3 November 2020	Limdi	Somabhai Gandalal Koli Patel	Indian National Congress	Kiritsinh Rana	Bharatiya Janata Party
3	3 November 2020	Morbi	Brijesh Merja	Indian National Congress	Brijesh Merja	Bharatiya Janata Party
4	3 November 2020	Dhari	J. V. Kakadiya	Indian National Congress	J. V. Kakadiya	Bharatiya Janata Party
5	3 November 2020	Gadhada	Pravin Maru	Indian National Congress	Atmaram Parmar	Bharatiya Janata Party
6	3 November 2020	Karjan	Akshay Patel	Indian National Congress	Akshay Patel	Bharatiya Janata Party
7	3 November 2020	Dang	Mangalbhai Gavit	Indian National Congress	Vijaybhai Patel	Bharatiya Janata Party
8	3 November 2020	Kaparada	Jitubhai Chaudhari	Indian National Congress	Jitubhai Chaudhari	Bharatiya Janata Party

=== Haryana ===
S.No	Date	Constituency	MLA before election	Party before election	Elected MLA	Party after election
1	3 November 2020	Baroda	Krishan Hooda	Indian National Congress	Indu Raj Narwal	Indian National Congress

=== Jharkhand ===
S.No	Date	Constituency	MLA before election	Party before election	Elected MLA	Party after election
1	3 November 2020	Dumka	Hemant Soren	Jharkhand Mukti Morcha	Basant Soren	Jharkhand Mukti Morcha
2	3 November 2020	Bermo	Rajendra Prasad Singh	Indian National Congress	Kumar Jaimangal (Anup Singh)	Indian National Congress

=== Karnataka ===
S.No	Date	Constituency	MLA before election	Party before election	Elected MLA	Party after election
1	3 November 2020	Sira	B Sathyanarayana	Janata Dal (Secular)	Rajesh Gowda	Bharatiya Janata Party
2	3 November 2020	Rajarajeshwari Nagar	Munirathna	Indian National Congress	Munirathna	Bharatiya Janata Party

=== Madhya Pradesh ===
S.No	Date	Constituency	MLA before election	Party before election	Elected MLA	Party after election
1	3 November 2020	Joura	Banwari Lal Sharma	Indian National Congress	Subedar Singh Rajodha	Bharatiya Janata Party
2	3 November 2020	Sumaoli	Adal Singh Kansana	Indian National Congress	Ajab Singh Kushwah	Indian National Congress
3	3 November 2020	Morena	Raghuraj Singh Kansana	Indian National Congress	Rakesh Mavai	Indian National Congress
4	3 November 2020	Dimani	Girraj Dandotiya	Indian National Congress	Ravindra Singh Tomar Bhidosa	Indian National Congress
5	3 November 2020	Ambah	Kamlesh Jatav	Indian National Congress	Kamlesh Jatav	Bharatiya Janata Party
6	3 November 2020	Mehgaon	O. P. S. Bhadoria	Indian National Congress	O. P. S. Bhadoria	Bharatiya Janata Party
7	3 November 2020	Gohad	Ranvir Jatav	Indian National Congress	Mevaram Jatav	Indian National Congress
8	3 November 2020	Gwalior	Pradhumn Singh Tomar	Indian National Congress	Pradhumn Singh Tomar	Bharatiya Janata Party
9	3 November 2020	Gwalior East	Munnalal Goyal	Indian National Congress	Satish Sikarwar	Indian National Congress
10	3 November 2020	Dabra	Imarti Devi	Indian National Congress	Suresh Raje	Indian National Congress
11	3 November 2020	Bhander	Raksha Santram Saroniya	Indian National Congress	Raksha Santram Saroniya	Bharatiya Janata Party
12	3 November 2020	Karera	Jasmant Jatav	Indian National Congress	Pragilal Jatav	Indian National Congress
13	3 November 2020	Pohari	Suresh Dhakad	Indian National Congress	Suresh Dhakad	Bharatiya Janata Party
14	3 November 2020	Bamori	Mahendra Singh Sisodia	Indian National Congress	Mahendra Singh Sisodia	Bharatiya Janata Party
15	3 November 2020	Ashok Nagar	Jaipal Singh Jajji	Indian National Congress	Jaipal Singh Jajji	Bharatiya Janata Party
16	3 November 2020	Mungaoli	Brajendra Singh Yadav	Indian National Congress	Brajendra Singh Yadav	Bharatiya Janata Party
17	3 November 2020	Surkhi	Govind Singh Rajput	Indian National Congress	Govind Singh Rajput	Bharatiya Janata Party
18	3 November 2020	Malhara	Pradyuman Singh Lodhi	Indian National Congress	Pradyuman Singh Lodhi	Bharatiya Janata Party
19	3 November 2020	Anuppur	Bisahulal Singh	Indian National Congress	Bisahulal Singh	Bharatiya Janata Party
20	3 November 2020	Sanchi	Prabhuram Choudhary	Indian National Congress	Prabhuram Choudhary	Bharatiya Janata Party
21	3 November 2020	Biaora	Govardhan Dangi	Indian National Congress	Amlyahat Ramchandra Dangi	Indian National Congress
22	3 November 2020	Agar	Manohar Untwal	Bharatiya Janata Party	Vipin Wankhede	Indian National Congress
23	3 November 2020	Hatpipliya	Manoj Choudhary	Indian National Congress	Manoj Choudhary	Bharatiya Janata Party
24	3 November 2020	Mandhata	Narayan Patel	Indian National Congress	Narayan Patel	Bharatiya Janata Party
25	3 November 2020	Nepanagar	Sumitra Devi Kasdekar	Indian National Congress	Sumitra Devi Kasdekar	Bharatiya Janata Party
26	3 November 2020	Badnawar	Rajvardhan Singh	Indian National Congress	Rajvardhan Singh	Bharatiya Janata Party
27	3 November 2020	Sanwer	Tulsiram Silawat	Indian National Congress	Tulsiram Silawat	Bharatiya Janata Party
28	3 November 2020	Suwasra	Hardeep Singh Dang	Indian National Congress	Hardeep Singh Dang	Bharatiya Janata Party

=== Manipur ===
S.No	Date	Constituency	MLA before election	Party before election	Elected MLA	Party after election
1	7 November 2020	Wangoi	Oinam Lukhoi Singh	Indian National Congress	Oinam Lukhoi Singh	Bharatiya Janata Party
2	7 November 2020	Lilong	Muhammad Abdul Nasir	Indian National Congress	Y. Antas Khan	Independent
3	7 November 2020	Wangjing Tentha	Paonam Brojen	Indian National Congress	Paonam Brojen	Bharatiya Janata Party
4	7 November 2020	Saitu	Ngamthang Haokip	Indian National Congress	Ngamthang Haokip	Bharatiya Janata Party
5	7 November 2020	Singhat	Ginsuanhau Zou	Indian National Congress	Ginsuanhau Zou	Bharatiya Janata Party

=== Nagaland ===
S.No	Date	Constituency	MLA before election	Party before election	Elected MLA	Party after election
1	3 November 2020	Southern Angami-I	Vikho-o Yhoshü	Nationalist Democratic Progressive Party	Medo Yhokha	Nationalist Democratic Progressive Party
2	3 November 2020	Pungro Kiphire	T. Torechu	Naga People's Front	T Yangseo Sangtam	Independent

=== Odisha ===
S.No	Date	Constituency	MLA before election	Party before election	Elected MLA	Party after election
1	3 November 2020	Balasore	Madanmohan Dutta	Bharatiya Janata Party	Swarup Kumar Das	Biju Janata Dal
2	3 November 2020	Tirtol	Bishnu Charan Das	Biju Janata Dal	Bijaya Shankar Das	Biju Janata Dal

=== Telangana ===
S.No	Date	Constituency	MLA before election	Party before election	Elected MLA	Party after election
1	3 November 2020	Dubbak	Solipeta Ramalinga Reddy	Bharat Rashtra Samithi	Madhavaneni Raghunandan Rao	Bharatiya Janata Party

=== Uttar Pradesh ===
S.No	Date	Constituency	MLA before election	Party before election	Elected MLA	Party after election
1	3 November 2020	Naugawan Sadat	Chetan Chauhan	Bharatiya Janata Party	Sangeeta Chauhan	Bharatiya Janata Party
2	3 November 2020	Bulandshahr	Virendra Singh Sirohi	Bharatiya Janata Party	Usha Sirohi	Bharatiya Janata Party
3	3 November 2020	Tundla	S. P. Singh Baghel	Bharatiya Janata Party	Prempal Singh Dhangar	Bharatiya Janata Party
4	3 November 2020	Bangarmau	Kuldeep Singh Sengar	Bharatiya Janata Party	Shrikant Katiyar	Bharatiya Janata Party
5	3 November 2020	Ghatampur	Kamal Rani Varun	Bharatiya Janata Party	Upendra Nath Paswan	Bharatiya Janata Party
6	3 November 2020	Deoria	Janmejay Singh	Bharatiya Janata Party	Satyaprakash Mani Tripathi	Bharatiya Janata Party
7	3 November 2020	Malhani	Parasnath Yadav	Samajwadi Party	Lucky Yadav	Samajwadi Party

== Local body elections ==
=== Ladakh ===
Date	Autonomous Council	Government before	Government after
26 October 2020	Ladakh Autonomous Hill Development Council, Leh	Bharatiya Janata Party	Bharatiya Janata Party

== See also ==
- 2020 Indian Rajya Sabha elections
- 2019 elections in India
- 2021 elections in India
