= 2020 Madhya Pradesh political crisis =

Political crisis in the Indian state of Madhya Pradesh

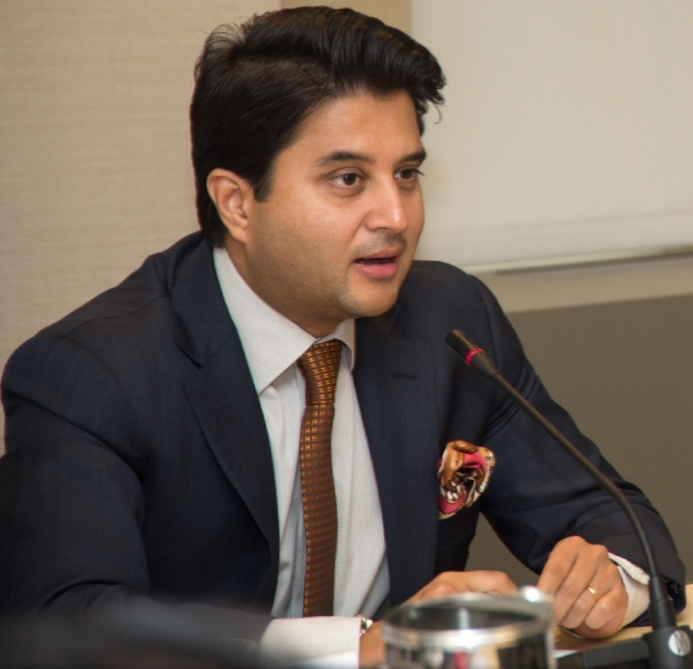
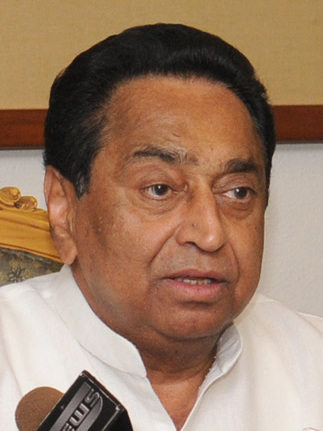
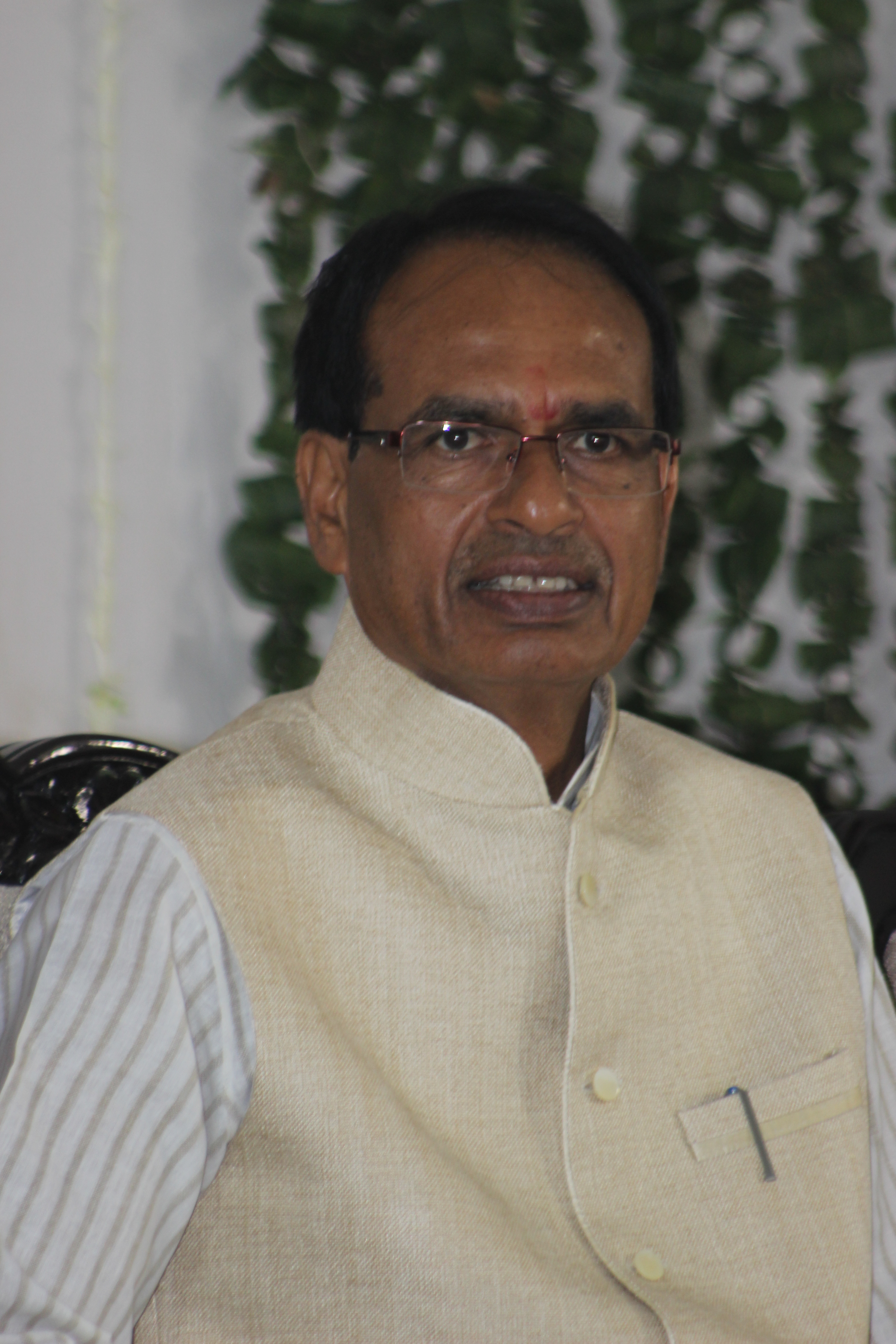
- Jyotiraditya Scindia (left), Kamal Nath (centre), Shivraj Singh Chouhan (right)
- Date: 5–20 March 2020
- Location: Madhya Pradesh, India
- Also known as: 2020 Madhya Pradesh government formation
- Type: Parliamentary crisis and government formation
- Cause: Resignation of Jyotiraditya Scindia and other Indian National Congress MLAs
- Participants: Bharatiya Janata Party (BJP); Indian National Congress (INC); Other political parties and Independents
- Outcome: Fall of the Kamal Nath government and formation of fourth Shivraj Singh Chouhan government.

In March 2020, a political crisis developed in the state of Madhya Pradesh, India, due to the resignation of 22 sitting MLAs of the Indian National Congress party from the state's Legislative Assembly. It eventually led to the fall of the Kamal Nath government and the subsequent formation of the fourth Shivraj Singh Chouhan government in Madhya Pradesh.

== Timeline ==
- In November 2018, elections in Madhya Pradesh were held for all constituencies of the Legislative Assembly. Although no party got a majority, the Indian National Congress (INC) was the single largest party in the assembly. They formed the government with the help of one BSP MLA, one SP MLA and four Independent MLAs. Kamal Nath was sworn in as the Chief Minister of Madhya Pradesh.
- On 5 March 2020, 10 MLAs (6 Congress members, 2 from BSP, 1 from SP and 1 Independent), flew to Delhi. 6 of these MLAs initially returned. The remaining 4 MLAs then flew to Bengaluru, where Congress MLA Hardeep Dang resigned from the party. The remaining three MLAs returned soon and denied the claims, made by other Congress leaders, that they were a part of horse-trading.
- On 10 March 2020, a senior leader of INC, Jyotiraditya Scindia suddenly went to meet Prime Minister Narendra Modi, and Amit Shah, Home Minister of India. After meeting them, at around 11:30 am, he resigned from the Congress party, saying that he felt very guilty while working for Congress.
- The next day (11 March), at around 3:00 pm, he joined Bharatiya Janata Party in the presence of Jagat Prakash Nadda, National President of Bharatiya Janata Party. After joining the party, he slammed Chief Minister of Madhya Pradesh, Kamal Nath and other Congress leaders for not giving the importance in the party. Throughout his press conference, he didn't mention the names of the Nehru-Gandhi Family. After joining the party, he was given the ticket of Rajya Sabha from Madhya Pradesh by Shivraj Singh Chouhan.
- Both the parties (INC and BJP) approached the Supreme Court (SC) to ask for a floor test in Madhya Pradesh. On 19 March 2020, the SC ordered that the floor test in the Madhya Pradesh Legislative Assembly should be done by 5:00 pm, of 20 March 2020.
- On 20 March 2020, after a press conference at noon, the Chief Minister Kamal Nath tendered his resignation.
- On 21 March 2020, in Delhi, all the 22 rebel ex-Congress MLAs joined the Bharatiya Janata Party, in presence of BJP's national president J P Nadda.
- On 23 March 2020, Shivraj Singh Chouhan took oath as the new Chief Minister.

=== Later events ===
- By 23 July 2020, another 3 Congress MLAs (Pradyuman Singh Lodhi (of Malhara), Sumitra Devi Kasdekar (of Nepanagar) and Narayan Patel (of Mandhata)) had resigned to join the BJP.
- On 3 November 2020, by-elections were conducted in the constituencies of all the resigning members to fill the vacant seats.

== List of MLAs who resigned ==
S.No	Constituency	Member	Date of resignation	2020 by-election results
1.	Surkhi	Govind Singh Rajput; Cabinet Minister	10 March 2020	Won back seat as BJP candidate
2.	Dabra	Imarti Devi; Cabinet Minister	10 March 2020	Lost election to INC candidate Suresh Raje
3.	Sanwer	Tulsi Ram Silawat; Cabinet Minister	10 March 2020	Won back seat as BJP candidate
4.	Bamori	Mahendra Singh Sisodia; Cabinet Minister	10 March 2020	Won back seat as BJP candidate
5.	Sanchi	Prabhuram Choudhary; Cabinet Minister	10 March 2020	Won back seat as BJP candidate
6.	Gwalior	Pradhumn Singh Tomar; Cabinet Minister	10 March 2020	Won back seat as BJP candidate
7.	Ashok Nagar	Jaipal Singh Jajji	10 March 2020	Won back seat as BJP candidate
8.	Karera	Jasmant Jatav	10 March 2020	Lost election to INC candidate Pragilal Jatav
9.	Suwasra	Hardeep Singh Dang	10 March 2020	Won back seat as BJP candidate
10.	Gohad	Ranvir Jatav	10 March 2020	Lost election to INC candidate Mevaram Jatav
11.	Gwalior East	Munnalal Goyal	10 March 2020	Lost election to INC candidate Satish Sikarwar
12.	Anuppur	Bisahulal Singh	10 March 2020	Won back seat as BJP candidate
13.	Morena	Raghuraj Singh Kansana	10 March 2020	Lost election to INC candidate Rakesh Mavai
14.	Badnawar	Rajvardhan Singh Dattigaon	10 March 2020	Won back seat as BJP candidate
15.	Mehgaon	O. P. S. Bhadoria	10 March 2020	Won back seat as BJP candidate
16.	Ambah	Kamlesh Jatav	10 March 2020	Won back seat as BJP candidate
17.	Mungaoli	Brajendra Singh Yadav	10 March 2020	Won back seat as BJP candidate
18.	Pohari	Suresh Dhakad	10 March 2020	Won back seat as BJP candidate
19.	Bhander	Raksha Santram Saroniya	10 March 2020	Won back seat as BJP candidate
20.	Dimani	Girraj Dandotiya	10 March 2020	Lost election to INC candidate Ravindra Singh Tomar Bhidosa
21.	Sumawali	Adal Singh Kansana	10 March 2020	Lost election to INC candidate Ajab Singh Kushwah
22.	Hatpipliya	Manoj Choudhary	10 March 2020	Won back seat as BJP candidate
23.	Malhara	Pradyuman Singh Lodhi	12 July 2020	Won back seat as BJP candidate
24.	Nepanagar	Sumitra Devi Kasdekar	17 July 2020	Won back seat as BJP candidate
25.	Mandhata	Narayan Singh Patel	23 July 2020	Won back seat as BJP candidate

== Outcome ==
A new government was formed by Shivraj Singh Chouhan as Chief Minister of Madhya Pradesh of the Bharatiya Janata Party.

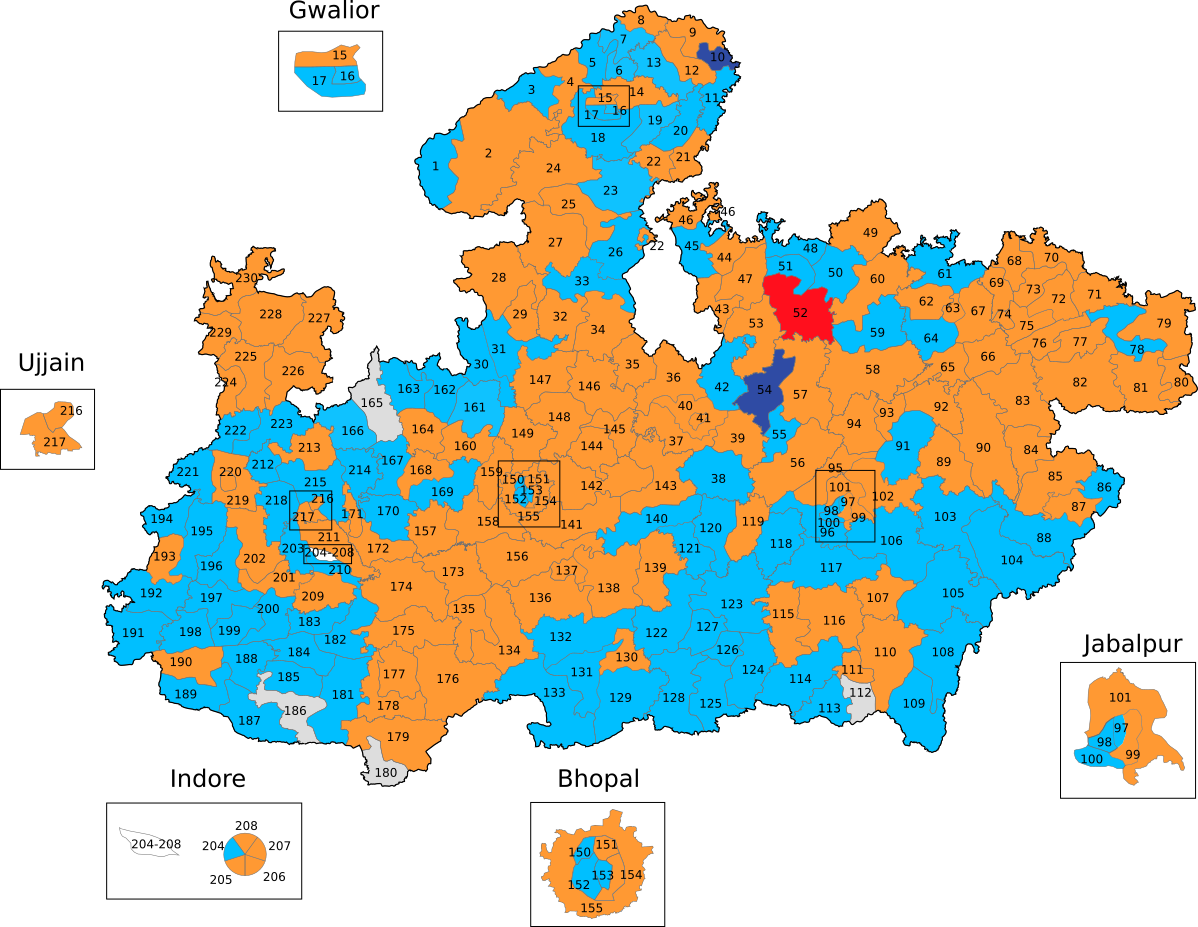
Constituency map after the 2020 by-elections

Due to these resignations, by-elections needed to be held for all these constituencies. The 2020 Madhya Pradesh Legislative Assembly by-elections were carried out in November 2020. 18 of the 25 MLAs involved in the crises, won their seats back as BJP candidates and the BJP government retained their majority in the Legislative Assembly.

== See also ==
- 2019 Karnataka political crisis
- 2019 Maharashtra political crisis
- 2020 Rajasthan political crisis
- 2020 Madhya Pradesh Legislative Assembly by-elections
