= Ramsiya Bharti =

Indian politician (born 1986)

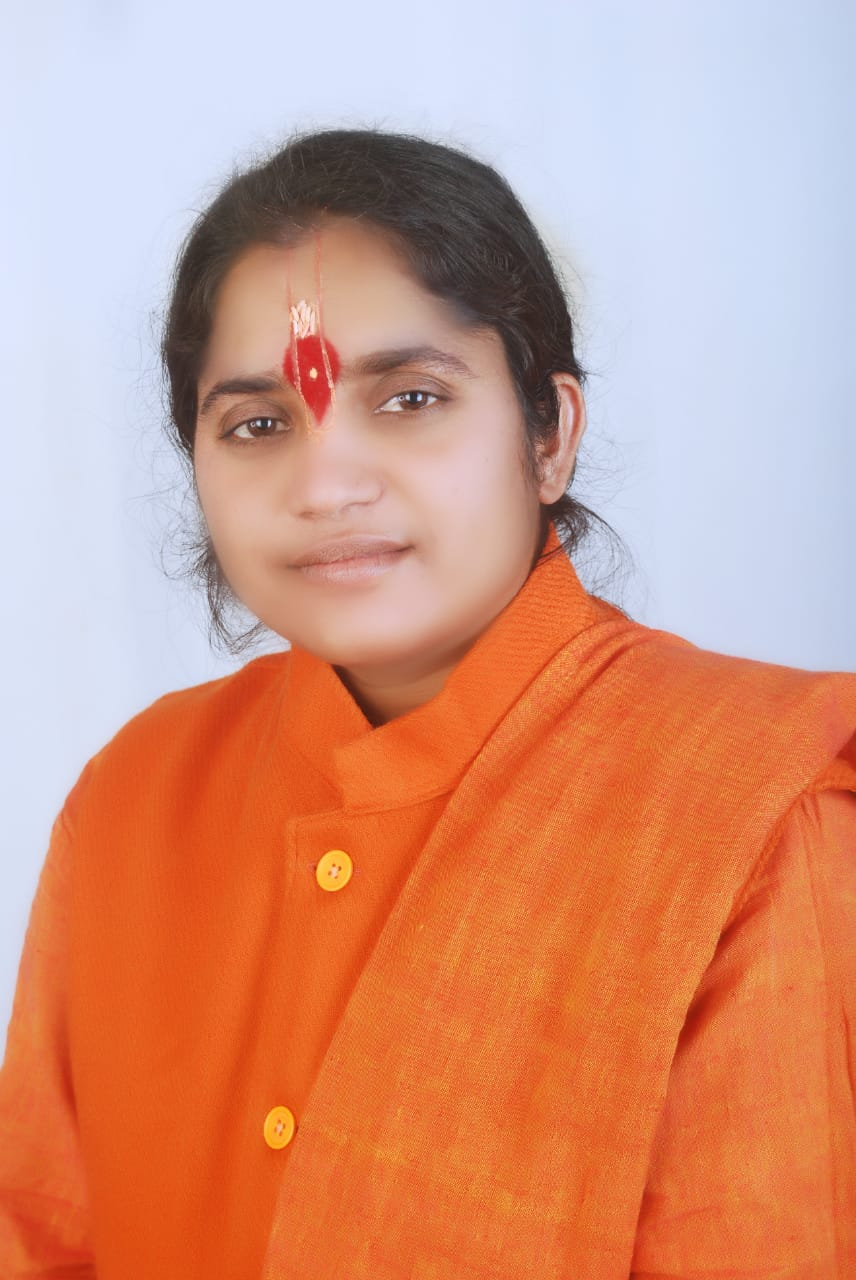
- Ramsiya Bharti in 2023

Member of Madhya Pradesh Legislative Assembly
- Incumbent
- Assumed office 2023
- Constituency: Malhara

Personal details
- Born: 1 April 1986 (age 39); Bamni Ghat, Bada Malhera
- Political party: Indian National Congress
- Parent: Swami Prasad Rajpoot

Ramsiya Bharti (born 1 April 1986) is an Indian politician from Madhya Pradesh, India. She was elected to the Madhya Pradesh Legislative Assembly winning the 2023 Madhya Pradesh Legislative Assembly Election from Malhara Assembly Constituency in Chhatarpur district. She represents Indian National Congress.

== Early life and education ==
Bharti was born in Bamni Ghaat, Bada Malehra. At a young age of 7 years, she started giving Pravachana. She completed her higher secondary education from Bada Malehra.

== Career ==
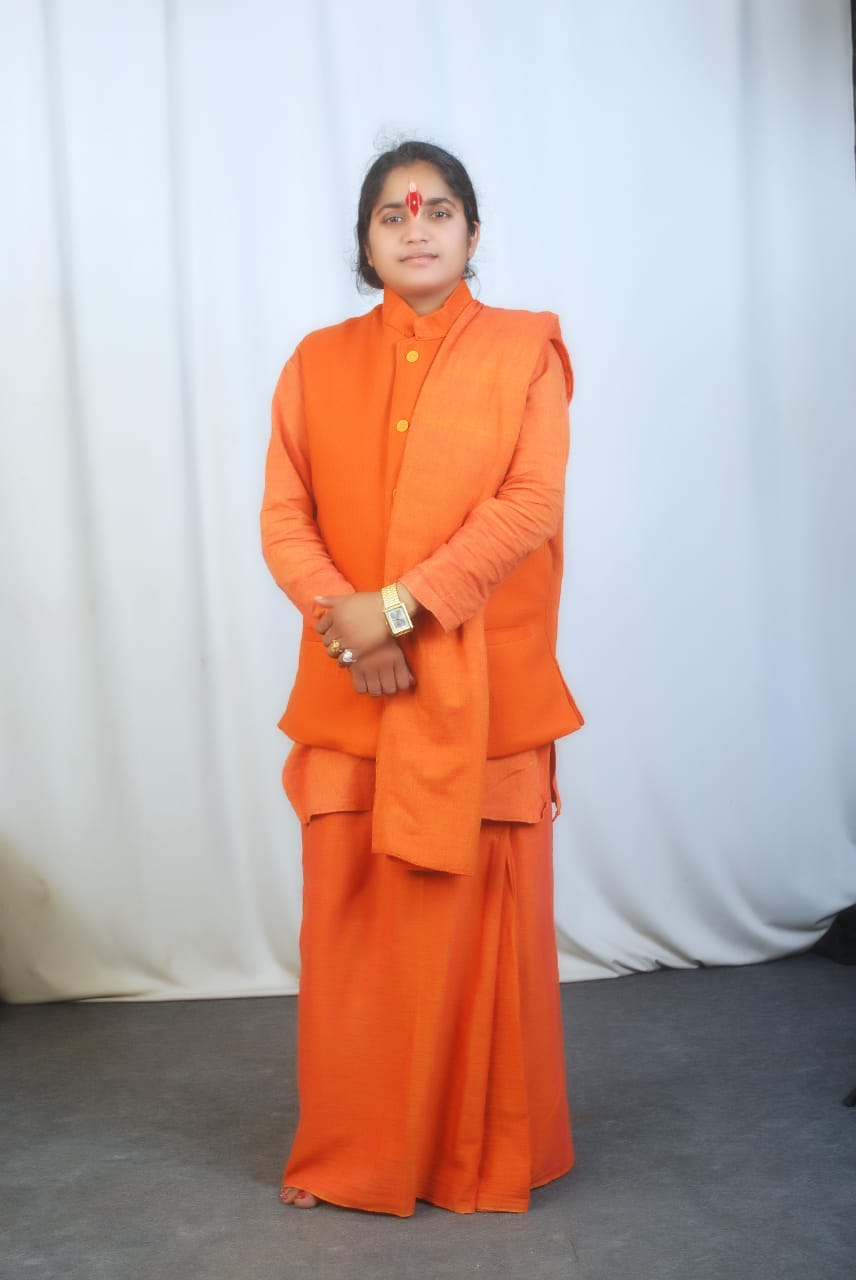
Standing portrait of Ramsiya Bharti in 2023

Bharti began her political journey with the Indian National Congress in 2015. She was elected to the Madhya Pradesh Legislative Assembly in 2023 from Malhara Assembly Constituency. She defeated Pradyuman Singh Lodhi of Bharatiya Janata Party by a margin of 21,532 votes. Earlier, she contested in the 2020 Madhya Pradesh Legislative Assembly by-elections but lost the Malhara seat.
