= 2020 Madhya Pradesh Legislative Assembly by-elections =

Indian state by-elections

- 3 November 2020

28 vacant seats in the Madhya Pradesh Legislative Assembly
- Turnout: 70.86%
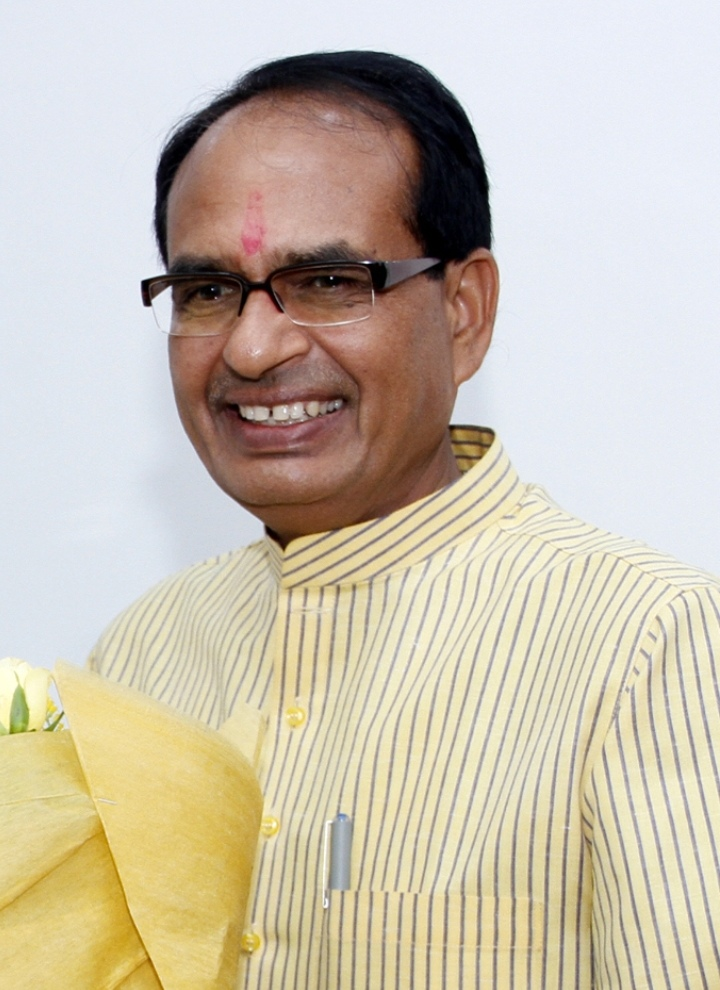

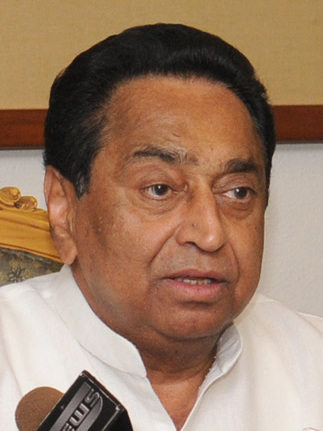
	Majority party	Minority party
Leader	Shivraj Singh Chouhan	Kamal Nath
Party	BJP	INC
Alliance	NDA	UPA
Leader's seat	Budhni	Chhindwara
Seats before	1	27
Seats won	19	9
Seat change	▲18	▼18
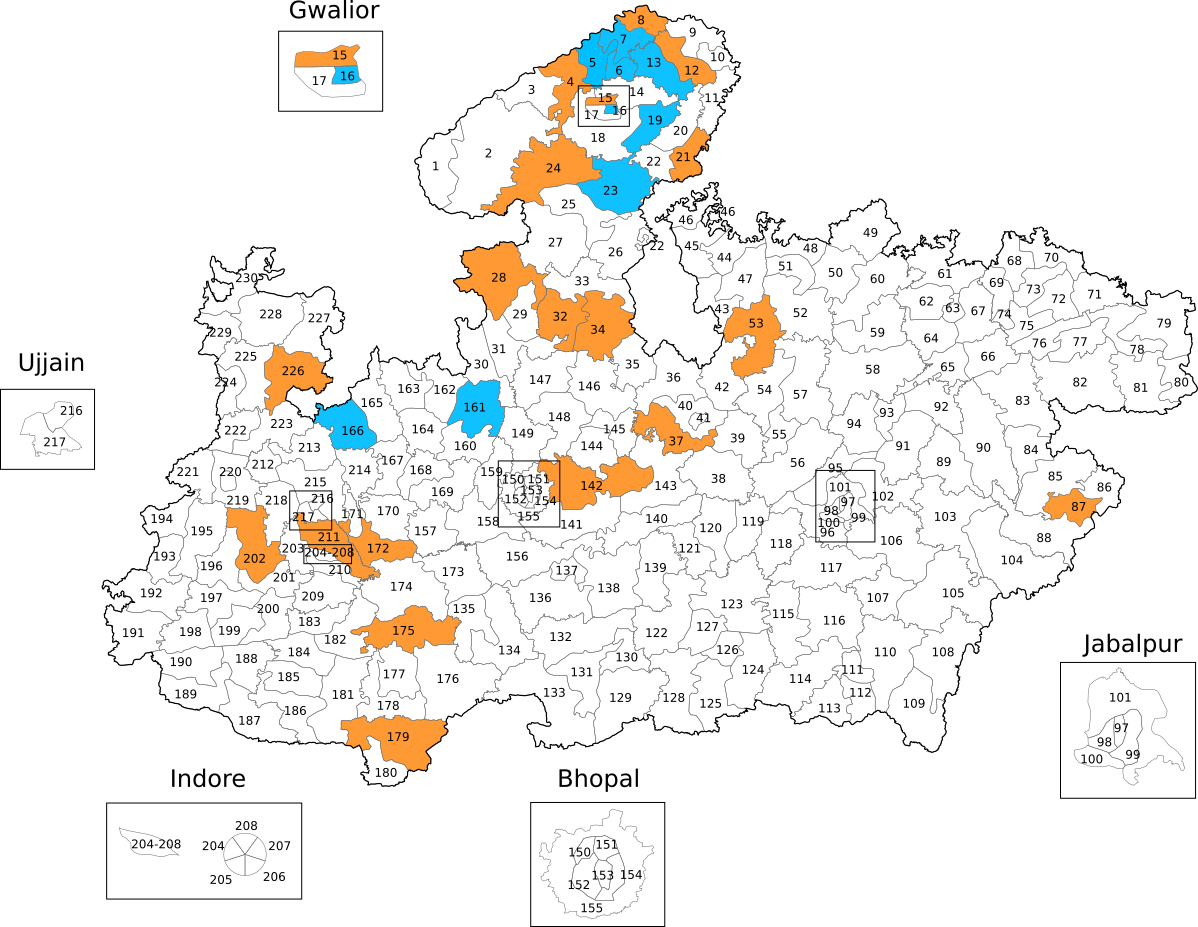
- Election results (by constituencies)
Chief Minister before election
Shivraj Singh Chouhan
BJP
Chief Minister
Shivraj Singh Chouhan
BJP

By-elections for twenty eight state assembly constituencies were held in Madhya Pradesh on 3 November 2020. The ruling BJP won 19 out of the 28 seats, gaining 18 seats and retaining its majority in the Madhya Pradesh Legislative Assembly. The opposition Congress won nine seats, losing 18 seats following the election.

== Background ==
In March 2020, Congress leader Jyotiraditya Scindia, along with 22 Congress MLAs, defected to the BJP. This resulted in the toppling of the Kamal Nath ministry and the ascendancy of Shivraj Singh Chouhan-led BJP government. By 23 July 2020, another three Congress MLAs (Pradyuman Singh Lodhi (of Malhara), Sumitra Devi Kasdekar (of Nepanagar) and Narayan Patel (of Mandhata)) had resigned to join the BJP.

In addition, three seats (Joura, Agar and Biaora) became vacant due to the deaths of their respective sitting MLAs. The elections were scheduled to be held on or before September 2020, but were delayed due to the COVID-19 pandemic.

== Election schedule ==
Event	Date	Day
Date for nominations	9 October 2020	Friday
Last date for filing nominations	16 October 2020	Friday
Date for scrutiny of nominations	17 October 2020	Saturday
Last date for withdrawal of candidatures	19 October 2020	Monday
Date of poll	3 November 2020	Tuesday
Date of counting	10 November 2020	Tuesday
Date before which the election shall be completed	12 November 2020	Thursday

== Results ==
=== Summary ===
Party	Popular vote		Seats		
Party	Votes	%	Contested	Won	+/−
Bharatiya Janata Party	2,229,584	49.5	28	19	▲18
Indian National Congress	1,825,488	40.5	28	9	▼18
Bahujan Samaj Party	259,155	5.75	28	0	Steady
Communist Party of India		0.08		0	Steady
Shiv Sena		0.13		0	Steady
Samajwadi Party		0.25		0	Steady
All India Forward Bloc		0.00		0	Steady
Others (Not including NOTA)		2.95		0	Steady
None of the Above		0.88			
Total/Turnout	4,512,231	70.86			
Source:ECI

=== Results by constituency ===
Serial No	Assembly constituency		Winner			Runner-up			Margin
Serial No	AC No.	Name	Candidate	Party	Votes	Candidate	Party	Votes	Margin
1	4	Joura	Subedar Singh Rajodha	BJP	67,599	Pankaj Upadhyay	INC	54,121	13,478
2	5	Sumaoli	Ajab Singh Kushwah	INC	86,909	Adal Singh Kansana	BJP	75,962	10,947
3	6	Morena	Rakesh Mavai	INC	53,301	Raghuraj Singh Kansana	BJP	47,550	5,751
4	7	Dimani	Ravindra Singh Tomar Bhidosa	INC	72,445	Girraj Dandotiya	BJP	45,978	26,467
5	8	Ambah	Kamlesh Jatav	BJP	51,588	Satyaprakash Sakhawar	INC	37,696	13,892
6	12	Mehgaon	O. P. S. Bhadoria	BJP	73,599	Hemant Satyadev Katare	INC	61,563	12,036
7	13	Gohad	Mevaram Jatav	INC	63,643	Ranvir Jatav	BJP	51,744	11,899
8	15	Gwalior	Pradhumn Singh Tomar	BJP	96,027	Sunil Sharma	INC	62,904	33,123
9	16	Gwalior East	Satish Sikarwar	INC	75,342	Munnalal Goyal (Munna Bhaiya)	BJP	66,787	8,555
10	19	Dabra	Suresh Raje	INC	75,689	Imarti Devi	BJP	68,056	7,633
11	21	Bhander	Raksha Santram Saroniya	BJP	57,043	Phool Singh Baraiya	INC	56,882	161
12	23	Karera	Pragilal Jatav	INC	95,728	Jasmant Jatav	BJP	65,087	30,641
13	24	Pohari	Suresh Dhakad Rathkheda	BJP	66,344	Kailash Kushwah	BSP	43,848	22,496
14	28	Bamori	Mahendra Singh Sisodia	BJP	1,01,124	Kanhaiyalal Rameshwar Agrawal	INC	47,971	53,153
15	32	Ashok Nagar	Jajpal Singh "Jajji"	BJP	78,479	Asha Dohare	INC	63,849	14,630
16	34	Mungaoli	Brajendra Singh Yadav	BJP	83,153	Kanhairam Lodhi	INC	61,684	21,469
17	37	Surkhi	Govind Singh Rajput	BJP	93,294	Parul Sahu Keshri	INC	52,303	40,991
18	53	Malhara	Pradyuman Singh Lodhi	BJP	67,532	Ram Siya Bharti	INC	49,965	17,567
19	87	Anuppur	Bisahu Lal Singh	BJP	75,600	Vishvnath Singh	INC	40,736	34,864
20	142	Sanchi	Dr. Prabhuram Choudhary	BJP	1,16,577	Madanlal Choudhary	INC	52,768	63,809
21	161	Biaora	Amlyahat-Ramchandra Dangi	INC	95,397	Narayansingh Panwar	BJP	83,295	12,102
22	166	Agar	Vipin Wankhede	INC	88,716	Manoj Manohar Utwal	BJP	86,718	1,998
23	172	Hatpipliya	Manoj Narayansingh Choudhari	BJP	84,405	Ku. Rajvir Singh Rajendra Singh Baghel	INC	70,501	13,904
24	175	Mandhata	Narayan Singh Patel	BJP	80,394	Uttampal Singh	INC	58,265	22,129
25	179	Nepanagar	Sumitra Devi Kasdekar	BJP	98,881	Ramkishan Patel	INC	72,425	26,340
26	202	Badnawar	Rajvardhan Singh Dattigaon	BJP	99,137	Kamalsing Patel	INC	67,004	32,133
27	211	Sanwer	Tulsi Ram Silawat	BJP	1,29,676	Premchand Guddu	INC	76,412	53,264
28	226	Suwasra	Hardeep Singh Dang	BJP	1,17,955	Bhai Rakesh Patidar	INC	88,515	29,440

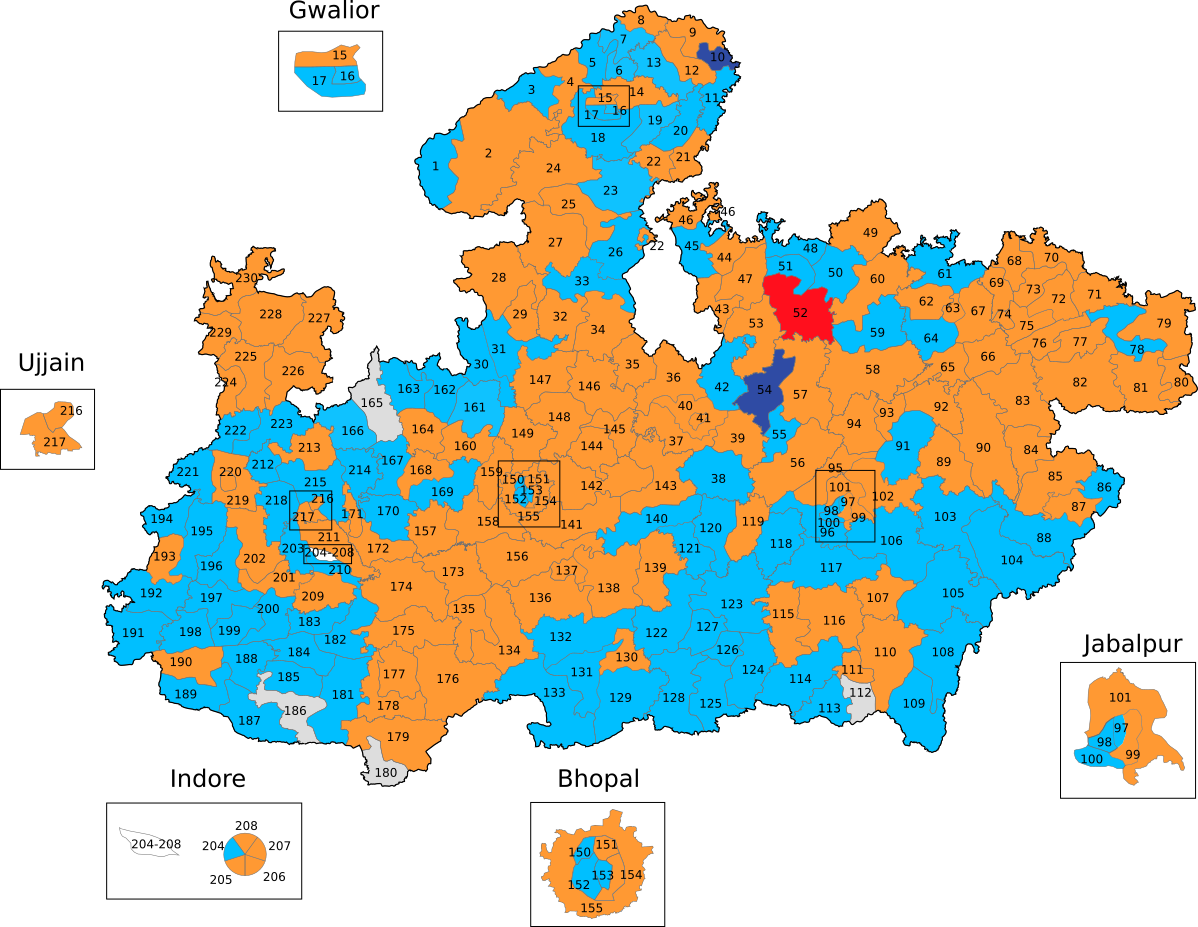
Madhya Pradesh Assembly constituency map after the 2020 by-elections

== See also ==
- 2020 Madhya Pradesh political crisis
