= Hindoria =

Hindoria Hindorgarh
- Town
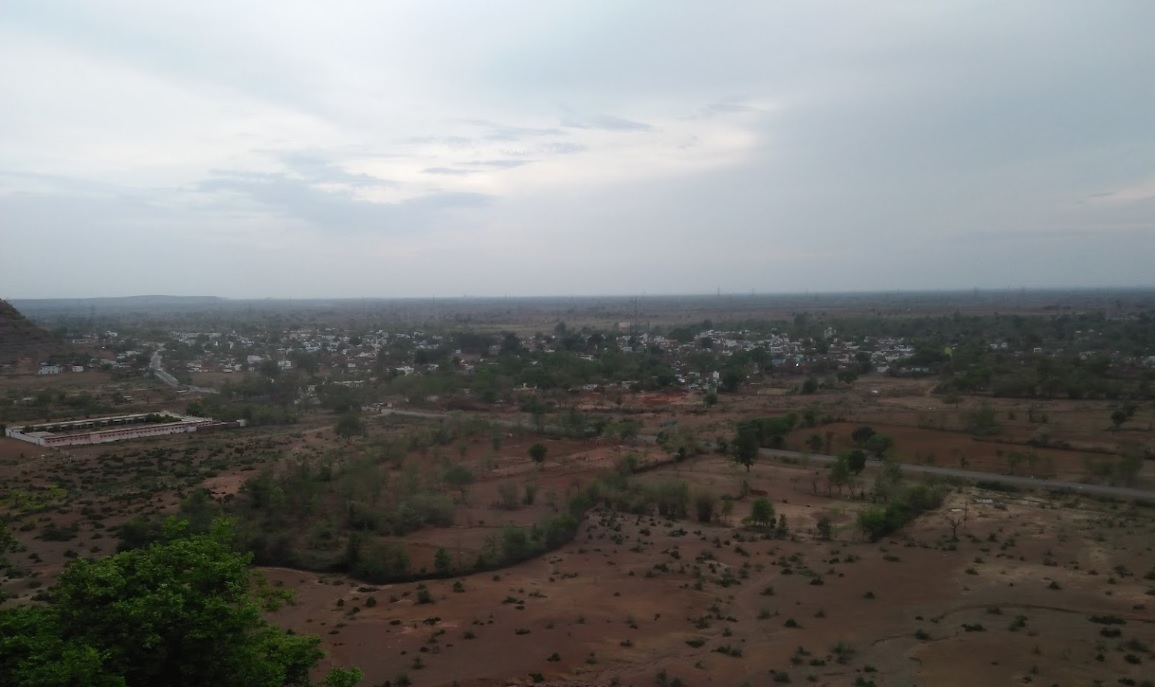
- View of Hindoria Town
- Nickname: "Raja Kishor Singh Ki Nagri"
- Location in Madhya Pradesh, India Hindoria (India)
- Coordinates: 23.9°N 79.57°E
- Country: India
- State: Madhya Pradesh
- District: Damoh

Government
  - Type: Nagar Parishad
- Elevation: 385 m (1,263 ft)

Population (2011)
  - Total: 16,001

Languages
  - Official: Hindi
- Time zone: UTC+5:30 (IST)
- PIN: 470771
- ISO 3166 code: IN-MP
- Vehicle registration: MP 34
- Website: hindoria.wixsite.com/hindoria

Hindoria is a town and a nagar panchayat in Damoh district in the Indian state of Madhya Pradesh.

== Geography ==
Hindoria is located at 23.9°N 79.57°E. It has an average elevation of 385 metres (1,263 feet). The peak of Bhondla is highest in Damoh district.

== History ==
Hindoria Riyasat or jagir was established by Raja Budhh Singh Lodhi a companion of Maharaja Chhatrasal Bundela. Hindoria Riyasat kept pace with national interests and under the able leadership of Raja Kishore Singh Lodhi of Hindoria, Raja Devi Singh of Singrampur, Pancham Singh of Karijog, Gangadhar Rao, Raghunath Rao, Mejban Singh, Govind Rao, and some others fought against the British rule in the rebellion of 1857. Hindoria was the biggest village in Madhya Pradesh till 1980.

== Demographics ==
The Hindoria city is divided into 15 wards for which elections are held every 5 years. The Hindoria Nagar Parishad has population of 16,001 of which 8,304 are males while 7,697 are females as per report released by Census India 2011.

The population of children aged 0-6 is 2,301 which is 14.38% of total population of Hindoria (NP). In Hindoria Nagar Parishad, the female sex ratio is 927 against state average of 931. Moreover the child sex ratio in Hindoria is around 929 compared to Madhya Pradesh state average of 918. The literacy rate of Hindoria is 78.88% higher than the state average of 69.32%. male literacy is around 88.09% while the female literacy rate is 68.93%.

Hindoria Nagar Parishad has total administration over 3,287 houses to which it supplies basic amenities like water and sewerage.

=== Caste factor ===
Schedule Caste (SC) constitutes 20.95% while Schedule Tribe (ST) were 5.06% of total population in Hindoria (NP).

=== Work profile ===
Out of the total population, 7,135 were engaged in work or business activity. Of this 4,576 were males while 2,559 were females. In census survey, worker is defined as person who does business, job, service, and cultivator and labour activity. Of the total 7135 working population, 76.31% were engaged in Main Work while 23.69% of total workers were engaged in Marginal Work.

== Education ==
Schools in Hindoria include:

=== Government schools ===
1. GOVT HSS BOYS, HINDORIA
2. GOVT HSS GIRLS, HINDORIA
3. GOVT MS BOYS, HINDORIA, JANPAD
4. GOVT MS BOYS, SENIOR BASIC, HINDORIA
5. GOVT MS GIRLS, HINDORIA
6. GOVT PS GIRLS, HINDORIA
7. GOVT PS HINDORIA
8. GOVT PS HINDORIA, MUKERWA WARD
9. GOVT PS HINDORIA, KILA WARD
10. GOVT PS HINDORIA, KANCHAN PURA
11. GOVT PS HINDORIA, CHIRAIPANI

=== Private schools ===
1. Shri Jageshwar Nath Middle School, Hindoria
2. Saraswati Sishu Mandir Hindoria
3. Gayatri Vidhya Peeth School, Hindoria
4. Shri G.P.Choubey Memorial English Medium School, Hindoria
5. Gyan Amrit English/Hindi Medium Middle School, Hindoria
6. Kumud Karmarkar English Medium School, Hindoria
7. Rajendra Pathak Memorial English Medium School, Hindoria
8. Priyadarshni ball mandir school, Hindoria

== Famous personalities ==
=== Pradyuman Singh Lodhi ===
- Thakur Pradyumn Singh Lodhi elected as MLA from Malhera constituency in state assembly election 2018. He is member and head of royal house of Hindoria and descendant of Raja Kishore Singh Lodhi who rebelled against britishers in 1857.
- Elected again as MLA in the November 2020 by-election as BJP Candidate 53 BADAMAlHERA SEAT.
- Now in charge of Chairman of State civil supplies corporation (SCSC).
- Rank:- Cabinet Minister, MP Government.

=== Thakur Rahul Singh ===
- Thakur Rahul Singh Lodhi, member of Royal house of Hindoria and former member of legislative assembly of Madhya Pradesh from the Damoh constituency. He defeated the former finance minister of Madhya Pradesh.
- He also quit Congress and joined BJP but his fate was not same as his cousin, he lost the by election to Congress veteran Ajay Tondon from Damoh constituency seat.
