= Ginsuanhau Zou =

Indian politician

Member of the Manipur Legislative Assembly
- In office 2012–2020
- Preceded by: T. Hangkhanpao
- Succeeded by: Chinlunthang
- Constituency: Singhat

Personal details
- Born: Ginsuanhau Zou
- Party: Bharatiya Janata Party
- Other political affiliations: Indian National Congress
- Profession: Social Worker

Ginsuanhau Zou is an Indian politician of Manipur and member of the Bharatiya Janata Party. He was elected as a member of the Manipur Legislative Assembly from Singhat constituency in Churachandpur District from the Indian National Congress in the 2012 and 2017 Manipur Assembly elections.

During the 2020 Manipur vote of confidence, he was one of the eight MLAs who skipped the assembly proceedings, defying the party whip for the trust vote. He resigned from Indian National Congress and later joined Bharatiya Janata Party in presence of Ram Madhav, Baijayant Panda and Chief Minister of Manipur N. Biren Singh. He was elected unopposed from Singhat in the 2020 Assembly by-elections.
