= Chinlunthang =

Indian politician

Member of the Manipur Legislative Assembly

Chinlunthang Manlun (born 1975) is an Indian politician from Manipur. He is a member of the Manipur Legislative Assembly from Singhat Assembly constituency, which is reserved for Scheduled Tribes, in Churachandpur district. He won the 2022 Manipur Legislative Assembly election, representing the Kuki People's Alliance.

== Early life and education ==
Chinlunthang is from Hiangtam village, Singhat, Churachandpur district, Manipur. He is the son of late Thangkhanlal. He completed his LLB in 2004 at Manipur University.

== Career ==
Chinlunthang won the 2022 Manipur Assembly election from Singhat constituency, representing the Kuki People's Alliance. He polled 12,098 votes and defeated his nearest rival, Ginshuanhau Zhao of the Bharatiya Janata Party (BJP), by 1,919 votes. In the 2017 Manipur Legislative Assembly election he contested on the BJP ticket and lost to Ginsuanhau Zou of the Indian National Congress by 1,162 votes.
