= Suresh Raje =

Indian politician

Suresh Raje (born 1960) is an Indian politician from Madhya Pradesh, India. He is an MLA of Indian National Congress from Dabra Assembly constituency of Gwalior district which is reserved for SC community. He won the 2023 Madhya Pradesh Legislative Assembly election. He received a total of 84,717 votes and won with the margin of 2,267 votes.
