= Bada Malhera =

- Nickname: BM City
- Location in Madhya Pradesh, India Bada Malhera (India)
- Coordinates: 24°34′9″N 79°19′46″E
- Country: India
- State: Madhya Pradesh
- District: Chhatarpur

Population (2013)
  - Total: 45,000

Languages
  - Official: Hindi
- Time zone: UTC+5:30 (IST)
- PIN: 471311
- Telephone code: Badamalhera 07689
- Vehicle registration: MP 16

Bada Malhera, is a town in the Chhatarpur district of the state of Madhya Pradesh, India.

== Demographics ==
The total area of Bada Malhera is 623 km^{2}, consisting of 596.07 km^{2} of rural area and 27.16 km^{2} of urban area. According to a nationwide census held in 2001, Bada Malhera's population is 53% male and 47% female, with a total population of 15,042. The population of children under 6 years of age is 18%, higher than the national average of 13.2%. Bada Malhera's average literacy rate is estimated at 56%, just below the 59.5% national average with 61% of males and 39% females considered functionally illiterate.

== State Representation ==
Bada Malhera comes under the Malhara Vidhan Sabha constituency. As of December 2020, its representative in Madhya Pradesh's Legislative Assembly is Pradyuman Singh Lodhi.

== Tourism ==
=== Nearby places of interest ===
- Khajuraho
- Dhubela
- Chhatarpur
- Bheem Kund, Bajna
- Cave of Sadwa

== Transport ==
=== By road ===
Bada Malhera is situated on the Kanpur-Sagar National Highway 146.

=== By train ===
The nearest railway stations are at Chhatarpur (55 km), Teekamgarh (65 km), Khajuraho (95 km), Harpalpur (105 km), Jhansi (175 km), Mauranipur (105 km), Sagar (110 km), and Satna (190 km).

== Education ==
Bada Malhera has a college affiliated with the University of Sagar (Dr. Hari Singh Gour University), which offers graduate and post-graduate courses in arts, commerce, and education.

== Economy ==
There are few opportunities for employment in Bada Malhera, with the local economy mostly dependent on farming (some of the locals are well-known grain merchants). However, the town does have a growing private commercial sector, mainly in retail. As such, the town needs help from the State to keep businesses running.

== Members of Legislative Assembly ==
Constituency of Vindhya Pradesh:

- 1951: Basant Lal, Indian National Congress

Constituency of Madhya Pradesh:

- 1962: Hans Raj, Indian National Congress
- 1967: Govind Singh Ju Deo, Independent
- 1972: Dashrath, Indian National Congress
- 1977: Jang Bahadur Singh, Janata Party
- 1980: Kapur Chand Ghuwara, Communist Party of India
- 1985: Shivraj Singh, Bharatiya Janata Party
- 1990: Ashok Kumar, Bharatiya Janata Party
- 1993: Uma Yadav, Indian National Congress
- 1998: Swami Prasad, Bharatiya Janata Party
- 2003: Uma Bharti, Bharatiya Janata Party
- 2006 (by-election): Kapur Chand Ghuwara, Bharatiya Janata Party
- 2008: Rekha Yadav, Bharatiya Janshakti Party
- 2013: Rekha Yadav, Bharatiya Janta Party
- 2018: Pradumanya Singh Lodhi, Indian National Congress

== List of villages ==
- Andhiyara
- Arol
- Balya
- Baman Kola
- Bamni
- Bamnora Khurd
- Bandha
- Bandhar
- Bankpura
- Baraj
- Barethi
- Barkhera
- Barma
- Barsat
- Beeron
- Sadwa
