= Singhat Assembly constituency =

Legislative Assembly constituency in Manipur State, India

Coordinates: 24.15°N 93.59°E

Singhat
- Constituency for the Manipur Legislative Assembly

Constituency details
- Country: India
- Region: Northeast India
- State: Manipur
- District: Churachandpur
- Lok Sabha constituency: Outer Manipur
- Established: 1972
- Total electors: 27,832
- Reservation: ST

Member of Legislative Assembly
- 12th Manipur Legislative Assembly
- Incumbent Chinlunthang
- Party: KPA
- Alliance: None
- Elected year: 2022

Singhat is one of the 60 Legislative Assembly constituencies of Manipur state in India.

It is part of Churachandpur district and is reserved for candidates belonging to the Scheduled Tribes.

== Members of the Legislative Assembly ==
Year	Member	Party
1972	Thangkhanlal	Indian National Congress
1974	Gougin	Manipur Hills Union
1980	Thangkhanlal	Indian National Congress
1984	T. Gouzadou	Indian National Congress
1990	Thangkhanlal	Kuki National Assembly
1995	T. Gouzadou	National People's Party
1998 by-election	Thangkhanlal	Indian National Congress
2000	N. Zatawn	Janata Dal
2002	Thangso Baite	Manipur State Congress Party
2007	T. Hangkhanpau	National People's Party
2012	Ginsuanhau Zou	Indian National Congress
2017	Ginsuanhau Zou	Indian National Congress
2020 by-election	Ginsuanhau Zou	Bharatiya Janata Party
2022	Chinlunthang	Kuki People's Alliance

== Election results ==
Vote share of winning candidates
2022	51.41%
2020 by-election	100%
2017	44.35%
2012	83.70%
2007	56.90%
2002	35.74%
2000	31.96%
1998 by-election	51.33%
1995	36.09%
1990	37.54%
1984	51.10%
1980	32.19%
1974	55.91%
1972	48.59%

=== 2027 Assembly election ===
2027 Manipur Legislative Assembly election: Singhat
Party	Candidate	Votes	%	±%
INC	Tuankhan Kiamlo Hangzo			
NDA				
NOTA	None of the above			
Majority				
Turnout				
gain from		Swing		

=== Assembly Election 2022 ===
2022 Manipur Legislative Assembly election: Singhat
Party	Candidate	Votes	%	±%
KPA	Chinlunthang	12,098	51.41%	New
BJP	Ginsuanhau Zou	10,079	42.83%	New
JD(U)	T. Hangkhanpau	1,031	4.38%	New
INC	Tuankhan Kiamlo Hangzo	267	1.13%	New
NOTA	None of the Above	57	0.24%	New
Margin of victory		2,019	8.58%	
Turnout		23,532	84.55%	▲84.55
Registered electors		27,832		▲5.04
KPA gain from BJP		Swing		

=== Assembly By-election 2020 ===
2020 Manipur Legislative Assembly by-election: Singhat
Party	Candidate	Votes	%	±%
BJP	Ginsuanhau Zou	Unopposed		
Registered electors		26,496		▼0.70
BJP gain from INC		Swing		

=== Assembly Election 2017 ===
2017 Manipur Legislative Assembly election: Singhat
Party	Candidate	Votes	%	±%
INC	Ginsuanhau Zou	8,131	44.35%	▼39.35
BJP	Chinlunthang	6,969	38.01%	New
NPP	Henlianthang Thanglet	3,124	17.04%	New
NOTA	None of the Above	111	0.61%	New
Margin of victory		1,162	6.34%	▼63.15
Turnout		18,335	68.71%	▲4.31
Registered electors		26,684		▲11.71
INC hold		Swing	▼39.35	

=== Assembly Election 2012 ===
2012 Manipur Legislative Assembly election: Singhat
Party	Candidate	Votes	%	±%
INC	Ginsuanhau Zou	12,875	83.70%	▲40.89
AITC	T. Hangkhanpau	2,185	14.20%	New
CPI	Lunkhomang	274	1.78%	New
Margin of victory		10,690	69.49%	▲55.39
Turnout		15,383	64.40%	▼26.35
Registered electors		23,886		▼4.08
INC gain from NPP		Swing		

=== Assembly Election 2007 ===
2007 Manipur Legislative Assembly election: Singhat
Party	Candidate	Votes	%	±%
MPP	T. Hangkhanpau	12,859	56.90%	New
INC	Thangso Baite	9,673	42.80%	▲14.93
Margin of victory		3,186	14.10%	▲6.23
Turnout		22,599	90.76%	▲2.82
Registered electors		24,901		▲14.84
MPP gain from MSCP		Swing		

=== Assembly Election 2002 ===
2002 Manipur Legislative Assembly election: Singhat
Party	Candidate	Votes	%	±%
MSCP	Thangso Baite	6,815	35.74%	▲30.21
INC	Hangkhanpao	5,314	27.87%	New
FPM	N. Zatawn	3,305	17.33%	▼3.89
SAP	T. Ngaizanem	1,455	7.63%	▼17.47
NCP	T. Gouzadou	1,332	6.99%	New
Manipur National Conference	Jubilee Momoi	531	2.78%	New
Margin of victory		1,501	7.87%	▲1.01
Turnout		19,067	87.93%	▼5.04
Registered electors		21,684		▼0.11
MSCP gain from JD(U)		Swing	▲3.78	

=== Assembly Election 2000 ===
2000 Manipur Legislative Assembly election: Singhat
Party	Candidate	Votes	%	±%
JD(U)	N. Zatawn	6,450	31.96%	New
SAP	T. Ngaizanem	5,066	25.10%	New
FPM	Thangkhenkhup	4,283	21.22%	New
RJD	Thangso Baite	2,751	13.63%	New
MSCP	T. Gouzadou	1,116	5.53%	▼43.14
MPP	Khamlienkhup	237	1.17%	New
Margin of victory		1,384	6.86%	▲4.20
Turnout		20,183	92.97%	▲5.89
Registered electors		21,708		▲0.35
JD(U) gain from INC		Swing	▼19.37	

=== Assembly By-election 1998 ===
1998 Manipur Legislative Assembly by-election: Singhat
Party	Candidate	Votes	%	±%
INC	Thangkhanlal	9,670	51.33%	▲24.54
MSCP	T. Ngaizanem	9,169	48.67%	New
Margin of victory		501	2.66%	▼3.64
Turnout		18,839	87.61%	▲1.21
Registered electors		21,633		▲5.98
INC gain from NPP		Swing		

=== Assembly Election 1995 ===
1995 Manipur Legislative Assembly election: Singhat
Party	Candidate	Votes	%	±%
MSCP	T. Gouzadou	6,327	36.09%	New
MPP	T. Ngaizanem	5,223	29.79%	New
INC	Thangkhanlal	4,696	26.79%	▲1.00
FPM	Vungkholian	977	5.57%	New
Margin of victory		1,104	6.30%	▼5.45
Turnout		17,530	85.88%	▼4.38
Registered electors		20,413		▲7.00
MSCP gain from KNA		Swing	▼1.45	

=== Assembly Election 1990 ===
1990 Manipur Legislative Assembly election: Singhat
Party	Candidate	Votes	%	±%
KNA	Thangkhanlal	6,464	37.54%	New
INC	T. Gouzadou	4,441	25.79%	▼25.30
INS(SCS)	Paughuam	4,440	25.79%	New
Manipur Hill People'S Council	S. Lianzakap	1,682	9.77%	New
Margin of victory		2,023	11.75%	▼2.91
Turnout		17,218	90.26%	▼0.37
Registered electors		19,077		▲34.53
KNA gain from INC		Swing	▼13.55	

=== Assembly Election 1984 ===
1984 Manipur Legislative Assembly election: Singhat
Party	Candidate	Votes	%	±%
INC	T. Gouzadou	6,567	51.10%	New
Independent	Thangkhanlal	4,683	36.44%	New
Independent	Goukhenpau	1,140	8.87%	New
Independent	Paukhogin	205	1.60%	New
Margin of victory		1,884	14.66%	▲11.74
Turnout		12,852	90.63%	▲9.44
Registered electors		14,181		▲0.13
INC gain from INC(I)		Swing	▲18.91	

=== Assembly Election 1980 ===
1980 Manipur Legislative Assembly election: Singhat
Party	Candidate	Votes	%	±%
INC(I)	Thangkhanlal	3,701	32.19%	New
INC(U)	Henlianthang Thanglet	3,365	29.27%	New
KNA	S. Lianzakap	1,750	15.22%	New
JP	T. Gougin	1,680	14.61%	New
Independent	Amchinkam	393	3.42%	New
Independent	Nengkhosuam	362	3.15%	New
Margin of victory		336	2.92%	▼11.96
Turnout		11,498	81.18%	▼1.33
Registered electors		14,163		▲23.83
INC(I) gain from Manipur Hills Union		Swing	▼23.72	

=== Assembly Election 1974 ===
1974 Manipur Legislative Assembly election: Singhat
Party	Candidate	Votes	%	±%
Manipur Hills Union	Gougin	5,276	55.91%	New
INC	Thangkhanlal	3,872	41.03%	▼7.56
Independent	Nengkhosuan	59	0.63%	New
Independent	Kamkhanthang	54	0.57%	New
Margin of victory		1,404	14.88%	▼5.48
Turnout		9,437	82.51%	▲6.81
Registered electors		11,437		▼18.57
Manipur Hills Union gain from INC		Swing	▲7.32	

=== Assembly Election 1972 ===
1972 Manipur Legislative Assembly election: Singhat
Party	Candidate	Votes	%	±%
INC	Thangkhanlal	5,166	48.59%	New
Independent	Kulzaoal	3,002	28.24%	New
Independent	Ginzanang	2,288	21.52%	New
Margin of victory		2,164	20.35%	
Turnout		10,632	75.70%	
Registered electors		14,045		
INC win (new seat)				

== See also ==
- List of constituencies of the Manipur Legislative Assembly
- Churachandpur district
