= Kamal Nath ministry =

Government of Madhya Pradesh (2018–2020)

- Ministry of Madhya Pradesh
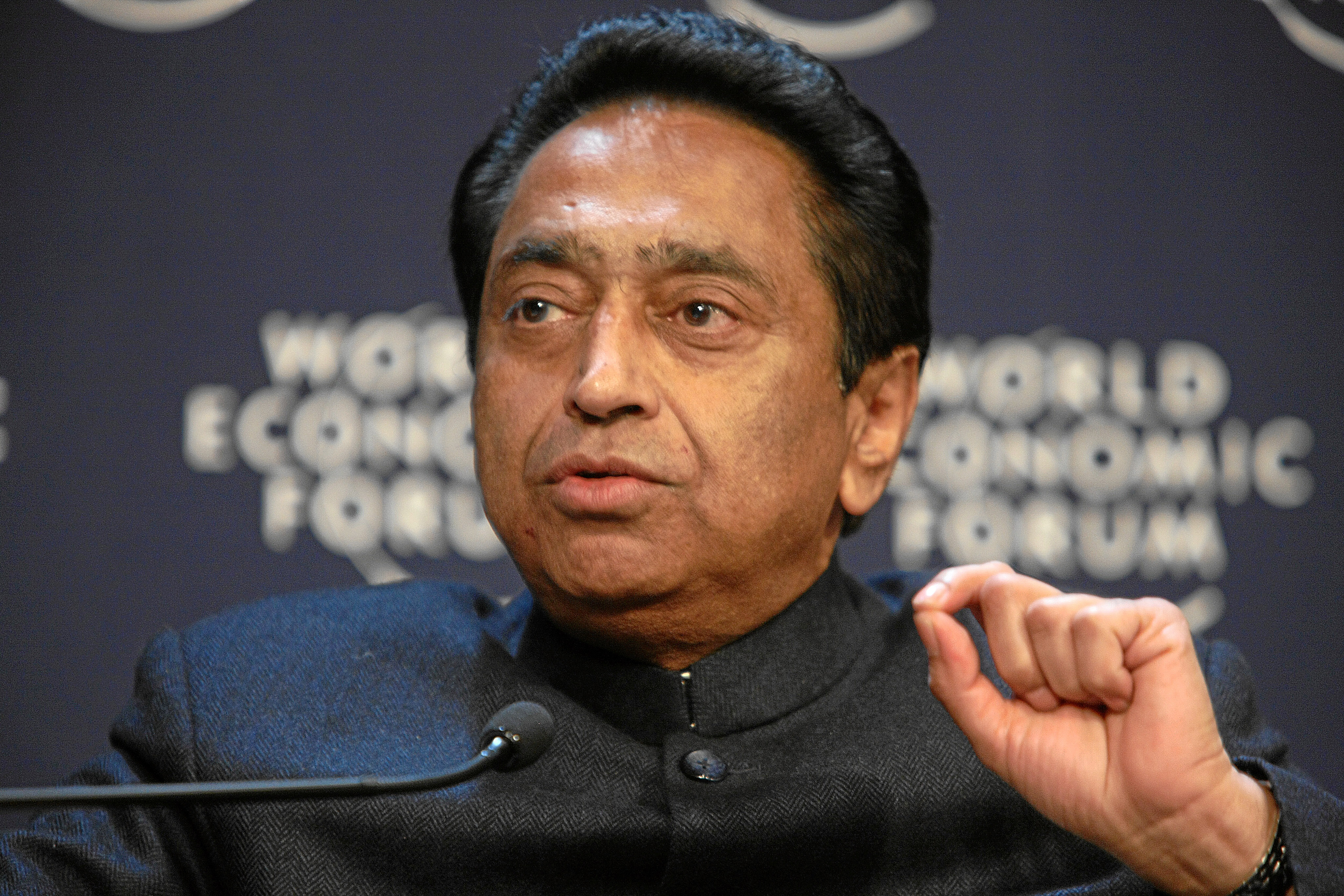
- Kamal Nath; Hon'ble Chief Minister of Madhya Pradesh
- Date formed: 17 December 2018
- Date dissolved: 20 March 2020

People and organisations
- Head of state: Governor Lalji Tandon
- Head of government: Kamal Nath
- No. of ministers: 2
- Ministers removed: 21
- Total no. of members: 23
- Member parties: INC; IND
- Status in legislature: Majority
- Opposition party: BJP
- Opposition leader: Gopal Bhargava

History
- Election: 2018
- Outgoing election: 2018
- Legislature term: 5 years
- Incoming formation: 2018
- Outgoing formation: 2020
- Predecessor: Shivraj Singh Chouhan Third ministry
- Successor: Shivraj Singh Chouhan Fourth ministry

The Kamal Nath ministry was the Council of Ministers in 15th Madhya Pradesh Legislative Assembly headed by Chief Minister Kamal Nath.

All the ministers were of Cabinet rank. Due to the political crisis in the month of March 2020, the ministry lasted for only 15 months i.e. from 17 December 2018 to 20 March 2020.

== Council of Ministers ==
Colour key for Party
INC
IND

SI No.	Name	Constituency	Departments	Party
1.	Kamal Nath; Chief Minister	Chhindwara	Industrial Policy.; Investment Promotion.; Non Resident Indian.; Other Departments not allocated to a Minister.	INC
2.	Pradeep Jaiswal	Waraseoni	Mineral Resources.	IND

=== Former Members ===
SI No.	Name	Constituency	Department	Tenure	Party	Reason
Ministers who resigned due to Political turmoil.
1.	Bala Bachchan	Rajpur (ST)	Home.; Jail.; Technical education.; Skill development and Employment.; Public Service management.; Affiliated with the Chief Minister.	December 2018 - March 2020	INC	Resigned due to Political turmoil.
2.	Tarun Bhanot	Jabalpur West	Finance.; Planning.; Economics.; Statistics.	December 2018 - March 2020	INC	Resigned due to Political turmoil.
3.	Vijayalaxmi Sadho	Maheshwar	Culture.; Medical Education.; AYUSH.	December 2018 - March 2020	INC	Resigned due to Political turmoil.
4.	Govind Singh	Lahar	Cooperatives.; Parliamentary affairs.; General administration.	December 2018 - March 2020	INC	Resigned due to Political turmoil.
5.	Sajjan Singh Verma	Sonkatch	Public Works Department.; Environment.	December 2018 - March 2020	INC	Resigned due to Political turmoil.
6.	Arif Aqueel	Bhopal Uttar	Bhopal Gas Tragedy Relief and Rehabilitation.; Backward Classes and Minorities Welfare.; Micro Small and Medium Enterprises.	December 2018 - March 2020	INC	Resigned due to Political turmoil.
7.	Sachin Subhash Yadav	Kasrawad	Farmers Welfare and Agricultural Development.; Horticulture.; Food Processing.	December 2018 - March 2020	INC	Resigned due to Political turmoil.
8.	Karada Hukum Singh	Shajapur	Water Resources.	December 2018 - March 2020	INC	Resigned due to Political turmoil.
9.	Lakhan Singh Yadav	Bhitarwar	Animal Husbandry.; Fishermen Welfare and Fisheries Development.	December 2018 - March 2020	INC	Resigned due to Political turmoil.
10.	Omkar Singh Markam	Dindori	Tribal Affairs.; Denotifed Nomadic and Semi-nomadic Tribes Welfare.	December 2018 - March 2020	INC	Resigned due to Political turmoil.
11.	Harsh Yadav	Deori	Cottage and Village Industries.; New and Renewable Energy.	December 2018 - March 2020	INC	Resigned due to Political turmoil.
12.	Jaivardhan Singh	Raghogarh	Urban Development.; Housing.	December 2018 - March 2020	INC	Resigned due to Political turmoil.
13.	Jitu Patwari	Rau	Sports & Youth Welfare.; Higher Education.	December 2018 - March 2020	INC	Resigned due to Political turmoil.
14.	P.C. Sharma	Bhopal Dakshin - Pashchim	Law and Legal Affairs.; Public Relations.; Science and Technology.; Civil Aviation.; Associated with the Chief Minister.	December 2018 - March 2020	INC	Resigned due to Political turmoil.
15.	Surendra Singh Baghel	Kukshi	Narmada Valley Development.; Tourism.	December 2018 - March 2020	INC	Resigned due to Political turmoil.
16.	Umang Singhar	Gandhwani	Forest.	December 2018 - March 2020	INC	Resigned due to Political turmoil.
17.	Kamleshwar Patel	Sihawal	Panchayat and Rural Development.	December 2018 - March 2020	INC	Resigned due to Political turmoil.
18.	Priyavrat Singh	Khilchipur	Energy.	December 2018 - March 2020	INC	Resigned due to Political turmoil.
19.	Sukhdeo Panse	Multai	Public Health Engineering.	December 2018 - March 2020	INC	Resigned due to Political turmoil.
20.	Brijendra Singh Rathore	Prithvipur	Commercial Tax.	December 2018 - March 2020	INC	Resigned due to Political turmoil.
21.	Lakhan Ghanghoriya	Jabalpur East	Social Justice and Disabled Welfare.; Scheduled Castes Welfare.	December 2018 - March 2020	INC	Resigned due to Political turmoil.
Ministers who resigned in support of Jyotiraditya Scindia, but were later removed by the Governor on the recommendation of the Chief Minister.
22.	Tulsiram Silawat	Sanwer	Public Health and Family Welfare.	December 2018 - March 2020	INC	Removed by the Governor on the recommendation of the Chief Minister.
23.	Govind Singh Rajput	Surkhi	Revenue.; Transport.	December 2018 - March 2020	INC	Removed by the Governor on the recommendation of the Chief Minister.
24.	Imarti Devi	Dabra	Women and Child Development.	December 2018 - March 2020	INC	Removed by the Governor on the recommendation of the Chief Minister.
25.	Prabhuram Choudhary	Sanchi (SC)	School Education.	December 2018 - March 2020	INC	Removed by the Governor on the recommendation of the Chief Minister.
26.	Pradhumn Singh Tomar	Gwalior	Food & Civil Supplies.; Consumer Protection.	December 2018 - March 2020	INC	Removed by the Governor on the recommendation of the Chief Minister.
27.	Mahendra Singh Sisodia	Bamori	Labour.	December 2018 - March 2020	INC	Removed by the Governor on the recommendation of the Chief Minister.

On 9 March 2020, due to the Political turmoil situation created by senior congress leader Jyotiraditya Scindia, an emergency cabinet meeting was held at the residence of Chief Minister Kamal Nath, where 16 ministers tendered their resignations in order to reconstitute the cabinet.

All the ministers expressed their faith in Chief Minister Kamal Nath and gave him free hand to reconstitute the cabinet.

All the ministers who resigned are considered to be close to Chief Minister Kamal Nath and Former Chief Minister Digvijaya Singh.

On 14 March 2020, the Governor of Madhya Pradesh, Lalji Tandon removed 6 ministers supporting Jyotiraditya Scindia. Chief Minister Kamal Nath had made the recommendation to the Governor to remove these 6 ministers.

On 20 March 2020, Chief Minister Kamal Nath resigned from the post of Chief Minister of Madhya Pradesh, after he failed to convince the Rebel Congress MLAs, who were campaigning in a resort in Bengaluru.
