= Buxwaha =

- town
- Location within Madhya Pradesh Location within India
- Coordinates: 24°15′7″N 79°17′15″E
- Country: India
- State: Madhya Pradesh
- District: Chhatarpur

Government
  - Type: Nagarparishad

Population (2011)
  - Total: 10,216

Languages
  - Official: Hindi
- Time zone: UTC+5:30 (IST)
- ISO 3166 code: IN-MP
- Vehicle registration: MP

Buxwaha is a Tehsil and a nagar panchayat in Chhatarpur district in the state of Madhya Pradesh, India.

Buxwaha is located between Latitude 24°15'N latitude - 79°17'E Longitude. Buxwaha Nagar Parishad (BUNP) covers an area of 14.73 sq.km and has a population of 10236 in 2011 with average household size as 6 and density of 800 persons per sq.km

== Demographics ==
As of 2001 India census, Buxwaha had a population of 9,064. Males constitute 53% of the population and females 47%. Buxwaha has an average literacy rate of 54%, lower than the national average of 59.5%; with male literacy of 63% and female literacy of 44%. 19% of the population is under 6 years of age.

There is a hilly forest area, spread over 384 hectare named buxwaha forest located near sagoria village.
