= Kamal Nath =

18th Chief Minister of Madhya Pradesh

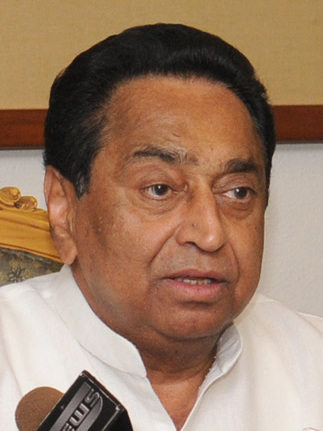
- Nath in 2012

18th Chief Minister of Madhya Pradesh
- In office 17 December 2018 – 23 March 2020
- Governor: Anandiben Patel; Lalji Tandon
- Preceded by: Shivraj Singh Chouhan
- Succeeded by: Shivraj Singh Chouhan

17th Leader of the Opposition in Madhya Pradesh Legislative Assembly
- In office 17 July 2020 – 28 April 2022
- Preceded by: Gopal Bhargava
- Succeeded by: Govind Singh

Member, Madhya Pradesh Legislative Assembly
- Incumbent
- Assumed office 10 June 2019
- Preceded by: Deepak Saxena
- Constituency: Chhindwara
Union ministerial offices
Union Minister of Parliamentary Affairs
In office 28 October 2012 – 26 May 2014
Prime Minister	Manmohan Singh
Deputy	Rajeev Shukla
Preceded by	Pawan Kumar Bansal
Succeeded by	Venkaiah Naidu
Union Minister of Urban Development
In office 19 January 2011 – 26 May 2014
Prime Minister	Manmohan Singh
Deputy	Saugata Roy; Deepa Dasmunsi
Preceded by	Jaipal Reddy
Succeeded by	Venkaiah Naidu
Union Minister of Road Transport and Highways
In office 28 May 2009 – 19 January 2011
Prime Minister	Manmohan Singh
Deputy	Mahadeo Singh Khandela; R. P. N. Singh
Preceded by	T. R. Baalu
Succeeded by	C. P. Joshi
Union Minister of Commerce and Industry
In office 23 May 2004 – 22 May 2009
Prime Minister	Manmohan Singh
Deputy	S. S. Palanimanickam; E. V. K. S. Elangovan
Preceded by	Arun Jaitley
Succeeded by	Anand Sharma
Union Minister of State (Independent Charge) for Textiles
In office 15 September 1995 – 20 February 1996
Prime Minister	P. V. Narasimha Rao
Preceded by	Gaddam Venkatswamy
Succeeded by	Gaddam Venkatswamy
Union Minister of State (Independent Charge) for Environment and Forests
In office 21 June 1991 – 15 September 1995
Prime Minister	P. V. Narasimha Rao
Preceded by	Maneka Gandhi
Succeeded by	Rajesh Pilot
Parliamentary offices
Pro tem Speaker of the Lok Sabha
In office 11 June 2014 – 14 June 2014
Preceded by	Manikrao Gavit
Succeeded by	Virendra Kumar Khatik
Member of Parliament, Lok Sabha
In office 10 March 1998 – 10 December 2018
Preceded by	Sunder Lal Patwa
Succeeded by	Nakul Nath
Constituency	Chhindwara, Madhya Pradesh
In office 18 January 1980 – 9 May 1996
Preceded by	Gargi Shankar Mishra
Succeeded by	Alka Nath
Constituency	Chhindwara, Madhya Pradesh

Personal details
- Born: 18 November 1946 (age 79) Cawnpore, United Provinces, British India
- Party: Indian National Congress
- Spouse: Alka Paul (m. 1973)
- Children: 2 (including Nakul Nath)
- Education: St. Xavier's College, Kolkata (B.Com)

Kamal Nath (born 18 November 1946; Hindi pronunciation: [kəməl n̪aːt̪ʰ]) is an Indian politician who served as the 18th Chief Minister of Madhya Pradesh from 2018 to 2020 and resigned after a political crisis. He was the Leader of the Opposition in the Madhya Pradesh Legislative Assembly from March 2020 to April 2022.

As a leader of the Indian National Congress he has served as the Minister of Urban Development. He is one of the longest serving and most senior members of the Lok Sabha, the lower house of India's bicameral Parliament. He was appointed the Pro Tem Speaker of the 16th Lok Sabha. He has been elected nine times from the Chhindwara Lok Sabha constituency of Madhya Pradesh. Nath was elected president of the Madhya Pradesh Congress Committee in May 2018, leading the party in the November–December 2018 assembly election. He assumed the office of Chief Minister on 17 December 2018 and resigned on 20 March 2020 due to lack of majority in government. He was elected as MLA of Chhindwara in 2019 after Deepak Saxena vacated his seat.

== Early life ==
Kamal Nath was born in Kanpur in a merchant family. His father Mahendra Nath established firms involved with exhibition and distribution of films, publishing, trading power transmission. Kamal is an alumnus of The Doon School. Later, he graduated in Commerce from St. Xavier's College, Kolkata.

== Career ==
=== Political career ===
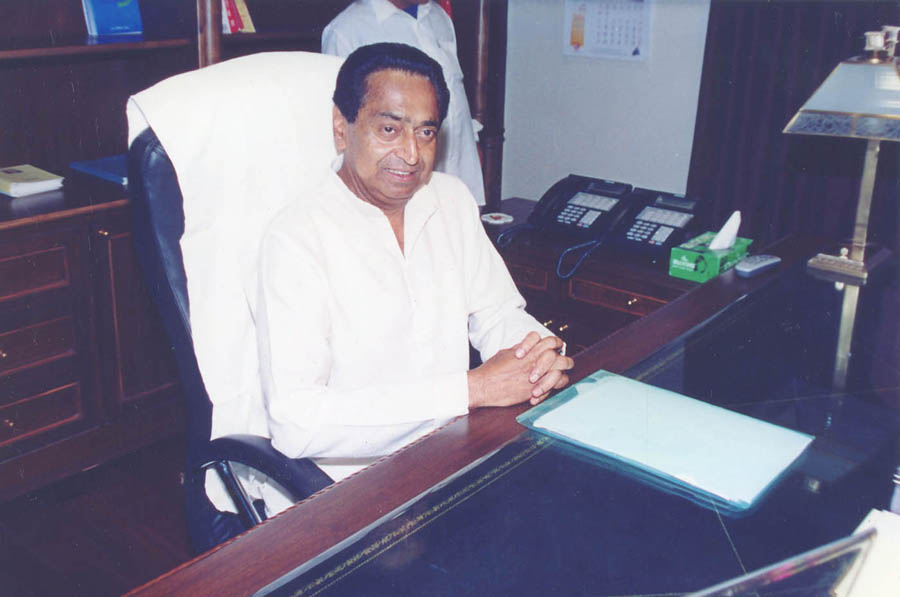
Kamal Nath assumes the charge of the Union Minister of Commerce and Industry in New Delhi on 24 May 2004

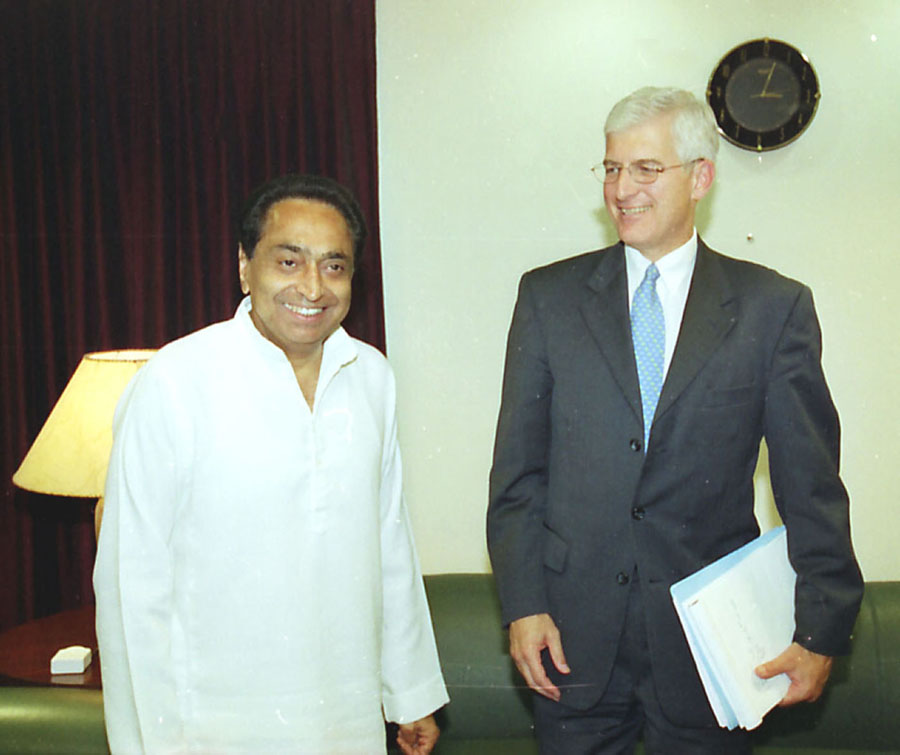
US Undersecretary of State for Economic, Business, and Agricultural Affairs Alan Larson and Kamal Nath in New Delhi in 2004.

Nath was first elected to the 7th Lok Sabha in 1980. He was re-elected to the 8th Lok Sabha in 1984, the 9th Lok Sabha in 1989, and the 10th Lok Sabha in 1991. He was inducted into the Union Council of Ministers as Union Minister of State (Independent Charge) of Environment and Forests in June 1991. From 1995 to 1996 he served as Union Minister of State (Independent Charge) of Textiles.

Nath was elected to the 12th Lok Sabha in 1998 and the 13th Lok Sabha in 1999. From 2001 to 2004, he was the General Secretary of the Indian National Congress (INC). He was re-elected to the 14th Lok Sabha in the 2004 elections and served as Union Cabinet Minister of Commerce and Industry from 2004 to 2009.

On 16 May 2009 he was re-elected to the 15th Lok Sabha and re-entered the Cabinet, this time as Union Minister of Road Transport and Highways. In 2011, as a result of a cabinet reshuffle, Nath replaced Jaipal Reddy as the Minister of Urban Development.

In October 2012 Nath was confirmed to the Ministry of Parliamentary Affairs in addition to his current role as Minister of Urban Development.

In late 2012 Nath replaced Pranab Mukherjee to help the United Progressive Alliance (UPA) government win a crucial debate on foreign direct investment in India (FDI). Nath also replaced Minister of Rural Development Jairam Ramesh as an ex officio member of the Planning Commission in December 2012.

From 4 to 5 June 2014 Kamal Nath was the only member to have taken the official oath as a member of the newly elected 16th Lok Sabha, and was made the Pro Tem Speaker. The first day of the Lok Sabha, on which the Pro Tem Speaker normally administers the oath to all other elected members, was interrupted by the death of Union Cabinet Minister of Rural Development Gopinath Munde. The House was adjourned after paying tribute to Munde and observing a two-minute silence. Since no other elected member had taken the oath that day, they were not officially members of parliament.

On 13 December 2018, Kamal Nath was elected as the Chief Minister of Madhya Pradesh after the INC emerged as the single largest party with 114 seats. His chief ministership was cut short following the decision of Jyotiraditya Scindia to join the BJP and resign from the INC. Other MLAs loyal to Scindia also resigned from the INC and their MLA posts. This led to the 2020 Madhya Pradesh political crisis which in turn resulted in the resignation of Nath as chief minister on 23 March 2020. Nath's replacement, Shivraj Singh Chouhan, was sworn in as chief minister of Madhya Pradesh on 23 March 2020.

On 28 April 2022, Kamal Nath stepped down from his position as Leader of Opposition in the Madhya Pradesh Assembly.

=== Political associations ===
Kamal Nath is a member of the INC (Indian National Congress) political party and served as general secretary from 2001 to 2004.

Nath has close ties with the Nehru–Gandhi family, being young friends and schoolmates with Sanjay Gandhi at the Doon School, an independent boarding school located in Dehradun.

=== Business career ===
Kamal Nath serves as president of the board of governors for The Institute of Management Technology (IMT), a management institution.

He is Chairman of "Madhya Pradesh Child Development Council" and Patron to the Bharat Yuvak Samaj (Youth Wing of All India Bharat Seva Samaj).

=== Achievements ===
Kamal Nath, as the Minister of Commerce and Industry, played a pivotal role in the formulation and implementation of India's National Foreign Trade Policy (FTP) during his tenure. This policy aimed to boost India's share in global trade and foster an export-friendly environment through innovative schemes such as the Focus Product Scheme (FPS) and Focus Market Scheme (FMS), introduced in 2006 under the Foreign Trade Policy 2004-2009. These schemes provided exporters with financial benefits like duty credits and helped target specific products and markets with export potential. India merchandise exports increased from $63.84 billion in 2003-2004 to $314.40 billion in 2013-2014.

== Political views ==
=== Economic development ===
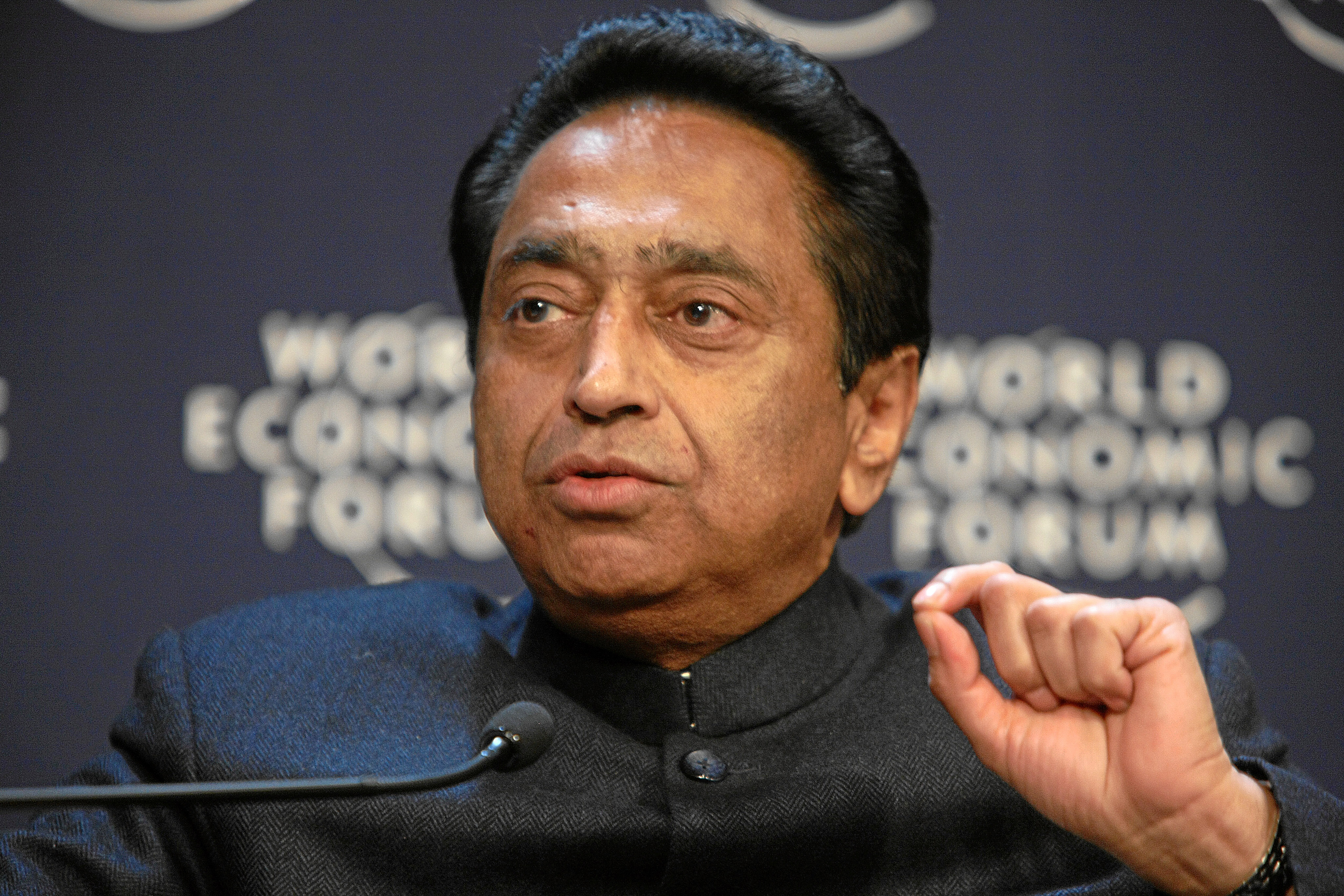
Kamal Nath at the World Economic Forum

Nath is a strong proponent of economic development in India. At the World Economic Forum (WEF) Davos, Switzerland in 2011 Nath shared his views on improving market access for developing countries in the area of agriculture stating India's applied tariffs for exports in developed countries was very low. Nath claims that this is due to continued imports through schemes like EPCG (Export Promotion Capital Goods Scheme) where tariffs are not levied.

=== Competing in the world market ===
Nath disagrees with the Trade protectionist outlook displayed among struggling countries and considers it to be the wrong response to a financial crisis. He has pushed for stronger international co-operation in India, such as expanding on Indo-German relations. Nath stated for a mutually beneficial relationship with Germany to exist it must rely on using both countries' manufacturing strengths. He outlined focus areas of production including telecom, engineering, environmental technology, chemicals, pharmaceuticals and food processing, and renewable energy. Kamal Nath describes India's entrepreneurial spirit and the countries' potential for global commerce growth in his book India's Century.

=== Kamal Nath on infrastructure development ===
Nath emphasises the need for infrastructure development in India with projects like the Delhi-Mumbai Industrial Corridor, a 90-billion-dollar industrial development project. The DMIC proposes major expansion of infrastructure and industry and aims to develop an industrial zone across six states in India. Within the first five years of the project expectations are set at doubling employment potential, tripling industrial output, and quadrupling exports from the region.

=== Public–private partnership (PPP) ===
Kamal Nath advocates a PPP model on completing such ambitious projects like the DMIC and other infrastructure development projects. He references success with PPP models implemented in India's Metro operations.

== Positions held ==
Year	Description
1980 - 1984	Elected to 7th Lok Sabha
1984 - 1989	Elected to 8th Lok Sabha
1989 - 1991	Elected to 9th Lok Sabha
1991 - 1996	Elected to 10th Lok Sabha: Minister of State for Environment and Forests (Independent Charge) (1991-95); Minister of State for Textiles (Independent Charge) (1995-96)
1998 - 1999	Elected to 12th Lok Sabha: Member, Standing Committee on Petroleum and Chemicals; Member, Committee on Members of Parliament Local Area Development Scheme; Member, Consultative Committee, Ministry of Power
1999 - 2004	Elected to 13th Lok Sabha: Member, Standing Committee on Finance (1999-2000); Member, Consultative Committee, Ministry of Mines and Minerals (2000-04)
2004 - 2009	Elected to 14th Lok Sabha: Union Cabinet Minister for Commerce & Industry
2009 - 2014	Elected to 15th Lok Sabha: Union Cabinet Minister for Road Transport and Highways (2009-11); Union Cabinet Minister for Urban Development (2011-14); Union Cabinet Minister for Parliamentary Affairs (2012-14)
2014 - 2018	Elected to 16th Lok Sabha: Pro-tem Speaker; Member, Standing Committee on Commerce; Member, Consultative Committee, Ministry of Finance and Corporate Affairs
2019 - 2023	Elected to 15th Madhya Pradesh Assembly: Chief Minister of Madhya Pradesh (2018-20); leader of opposition, Madhya Pradesh (2020-22)

== Controversies ==
=== Rice export accusations ===
In 2007, during Kamal Nath's tenure as Commerce minister, an Empowered Group of Ministers that included Nath, Pranab Mukherjee, and Sharad Pawar helped lift a ban on the export of non-basmati rice. It was alleged that PSUs involved in export of this rice to Africa outsourced the efforts to domestic private companies. It is claimed that the private companies made large profits while the PSUs reported small margins.

He was charge sheeted in the Hawala scandal and denied a ticket by the Congress itself in 1996, wherein he made his wife Alka Nath stand for elections from the Chhindwara (Lok Sabha constituency).

=== 1984 anti-Sikh massacre ===
On 1 November 1984, a day after Indira Gandhi's assassination, an anti-Sikh massacre broke out in Delhi as a result of which at least 2,733 people were killed by mobs. The Nanavati commission, led by a retired Judge of the Supreme Court of India, investigated the riots some 25 years after they happened but was unable to find surviving evidence. The commission found that the allegations of his involvement lacked sufficient evidence as of 2008–09. Nath was not charged and he later stated that he was "fully absolved" by the Nanavati Commission.

=== 2019 Income Tax Raid ===
The Income Tax Department, an Indian government agency, conducted inspections at the properties of relatives and aides of CM Kamal Nath in April 2019. The agency claimed detecting about ₹281 crore in unaccounted cash, including ₹20 crore paid to the Congress headquarters in Delhi through hawala. Kailash Vijayvargiya tweeted about the estimation of the detected illegal cash before the Central Board of Direct Taxes' statement on the raids, Kamal Nath's media coordinator Narender Saluja in turn said the raids were orchestrated to malign his party.

=== Misogynistic comments ===
While addressing a rally during the 2020 Madhya Pradesh By-Election, Nath referred to MP cabinet minister Imarti Devi as 'Item' (colloquially considered as a sexually provocative word/objectification of women). His comments were heavily criticised by several leaders and activists. The Bharatiya Janata Party and the National Commission for Women approached to the Election Commission of India to complain about the derogatory remarks against the Scheduled Caste candidate and demanded to ban him from campaigning during the by-polls.

On 30 October 2020, the Election Commission of India revoked the star campaigner status of Kamal Nath citing repeated violation of Model Code of Conduct while campaigning for the elections.

== Election history ==
=== Lok Sabha ===
Year	Constituency	Party	Votes	%	Opponent	Opponent party	Opponent votes	%	Result	Margin	%
2014	Chhindwara	INC	5,59,755	50.54	Ch. Chandrabhan Kuber Singh	BJP	4,43,218	40.01	Won	1,16,537	10.53
2009	Chhindwara	INC	4,09,736	49.41	Marot Rao Khavase	BJP	2,88,516	34.79	Won	1,21,220	14.62
2004	Chhindwara	INC	3,08,563	40.89	Prahlad Singh Patel	BJP	2,44,855	32.45	Won	63,708	8.44
1999	Chhindwara	INC	3,99,904	63.98	Santosh Jain	BJP	2,10,976	33.75	Won	1,88,928	30.23
1998	Chhindwara	INC	4,06,249	57.1	Sunder Lal Patwa	BJP	2,52,851	35.5	Won	1,53,398	21.6
1997*	Chhindwara	INC	3,06,622	45.75	Sunder Lal Patwa	BJP	3,44,302	51.37	Lost	-37,680	-5.62
1991	Chhindwara	INC	2,14,456	55.98	Chandrabhan Singh Chaudhary	BJP	1,34,824	35.19	Won	79,632	20.79
1989	Chhindwara	INC	2,11,799	50.14	Madhav Lal Dube	JD	1,71,695	40.65	Won	40,104	9.49
1984	Chhindwara	INC	2,34,846	67.17	Batra Ram Kishan	BJP	81,021	23.17	Won	1,53,825	44
1980	Chhindwara	INC	1,47,779	51.59	Pratul Chandra Dwivedi	JP	77,648	27.11	Won	70,131	24.48

- (*) denotes by-election

=== Madhya Pradesh Legislative Assembly ===
Year	Constituency	Party	Votes	%	Opponent	Opponent party	Opponent votes	%	Result	Margin	%
2023	Chhindwara	INC	1,32,302	56.44	Vivek Bunty Sahu	BJP	95,708	40.83	Won	36,594	15.61
2019*	Chhindwara	INC	1,14,459	55.53	Vivek Bunty Sahu	BJP	88,622	43.00	Won	25,837	12.53

- (*) denotes by-election

== Personal life ==
Kamal Nath was born in 1946 In Kanpur to Mahendra Nath and Lila Nath. He has two sisters, Anita Puri and Rita Jolly. He married Alka Nath on 27 January 1973 and has two sons, Nakul Nath and Bakul Nath. The family has owned several successful businesses including real estate, aviation, plantations and hospitality. Alka Nath and Nakul Nath have both been elected to India's parliament.

== Awards and recognition ==
- In 2006 Kamal Nath received an Honorary Doctorate from Jabalpur's Rani Durgavati University for his contributions to the public sector.
- Kamal Nath was named the FDI Personality of the Year 2007 by the FDI magazine and the Financial Times Business for his "Active efforts to attract foreign businesses to India, boost exports, and promote trade and investment".
- In 2008 he was honoured with the title "Business Reformer of the year" by The Economic Times.
- In November 2012, he received the "ABLF Statesman Award" at the Asian Business Leadership Forum Awards 2012.

== See also ==
- Kamal Nath ministry

Lok Sabha
Preceded by Gargi Shankar Mishra	Member of Parliament for Chhindwara; 1980 – 1996	Succeeded by Alka Nath
Preceded by Sunder Lal Patwa	Member of Parliament for Chhindwara; 1998 – 2019	Succeeded by Nakul Nath
Political offices
Preceded by Arun Jaitley	Union Minister of Commerce and Industry; 23 May 2004 – 22 May 2009	Succeeded by Anand Sharma
Preceded by T R Baalu	Union Minister of Road Transport and Highways; 22 May 2009 – 18 January 2011	Succeeded by C. P. Joshi
Preceded by Jaipal Reddy	Union Minister of Urban Development; 19 January 2011 – 25 May 2014	Succeeded by Venkaiah Naidu
Preceded by Shivraj Singh Chouhan	Chief Minister of Madhya Pradesh; 17 December 2018 – present	Incumbent
