= Rekha Yadav =

Indian politician

Rekha Yadav (Hindi: रेखा यादव) is an Indian politician and a member of the Bharatiya Janshakti Party. She was the member of the Madhya Pradesh Legislative Assembly, representing Malhara constituency in Chhatarpur district. She was elected from this constituency in 2008.

== See also ==
- Madhya Pradesh Legislative Assembly Election 2008
