= Bisahulal Singh =

Indian politician

Member of Madhya Pradesh Legislative Assembly
- Incumbent
- Assumed office 2018
- Preceded by: Ramlal Rautel
- Constituency: Anuppur

Personal details
- Born: 1 August 1950 (age 75) Village Parasi, Post Latar, Dist. Anuppur
- Party: Bharatiya Janata Party
- Other political affiliations: Indian National Congress
- Spouse: Jagotiya Bai
- Children: 6 sons
- Education: M. A.
- Profession: Agriculture
- source

Bisahulal Singh is an Indian politician. He was elected to the Madhya Pradesh Legislative Assembly from Anuppur. He was an elected member of the Madhya Pradesh Legislative Assembly as a member of the Indian National Congress. During 2020 Madhya Pradesh political crisis, he supported senior Congress leader Jyotiraditya Scindia and was one of the 22 MLAs who resigned and later joined Bharatiya Janata Party.
