= Imarti Devi =

Indian politician

Minister of Women and Child Development, Madhya Pradesh Government
- In office July 2020 – November 2020
- Chief Minister: Shivraj Singh Chouhan
- In office December 2018 – March 2020
- Chief Minister: Kamal Nath
- Preceded by: Archana Chitnis

Member of the Madhya Pradesh Legislative Assembly
- In office 2008 – November 2020
- Preceded by: Narottam Mishra
- Succeeded by: Suresh Raje
- Constituency: Dabra

Personal details
- Born: 14 April 1975 (age 51) Charbara, Madhya Pradesh, India
- Party: Bharatiya Janata Party
- Spouse: Puran Singh Suman
- Parent: Shri Ram Singh
- Education: HSC
- Profession: Politician, Agriculturist
- As of 23 July, 2018 Source: ["Biography" (PDF). Vidhan Sabha, Madhya Pradesh Legislative Assembly.]

Imarti Devi (born 14 April 1975) is an Indian politician and a member of the Bharatiya Janata Party. She had served as Minister of Women and Child Development in Madhya Pradesh Government, first in Kamal Nath's Congress government from December 2018 to March 2020, and later under Shivraj Chauhan's BJP government from July 2020 to November 2020. She lost the 2020 Madhya Pradesh Legislative Assembly by-elections from Dabra against the Suresh Raje of Indian National Congress.

== Political career ==
She started her political career by becoming the Sr. Vice-President of District IYC, Gwalior in 1997.

During 2004–2009 she was a member of District Panchayat, Gwalior and is the chairperson of Block Congress Dabra since 2005. She was elected to Madhya Pradesh Legislative Assembly for the first time in 2008. She subsequently got re-elected in 2013 assembly elections.

In December 2018, She was inducted into the Kamal Nath cabinet as Public Health and Family Welfare of Madhya Pradesh. During 2020 Madhya Pradesh political crisis, She supported senior Congress leader Jyotiraditya Scindia and was one of the 22 MLAs who resigned.

== Personal life ==
She is married to Puran Singh Suman and has one daughter.

== Legal Affairs ==
In November 2016, Gwalior sessions court had ordered to book Imarti Devi, as she was accused of harassing her nephew's wife for dowry. Later on the proceedings were stayed by the High Court and finally she was acquitted from all the charges.

== See also ==
- Madhya Pradesh Legislative Assembly
- 2013 Madhya Pradesh Legislative Assembly election
- 2008 Madhya Pradesh Legislative Assembly election
