= Malhara Assembly constituency =

Assembly constituency in Madhya Pradesh, India

Coordinates: 25.04°N 79.68°E

Malhara
- Constituency No. 53 for the Madhya Pradesh Legislative Assembly

Constituency details
- Country: India
- Region: Central India
- State: Madhya Pradesh
- District: Chhatarpur
- Lok Sabha constituency: Damoh
- Established: 1951
- Reservation: None

Member of Legislative Assembly
- 16th Madhya Pradesh Legislative Assembly
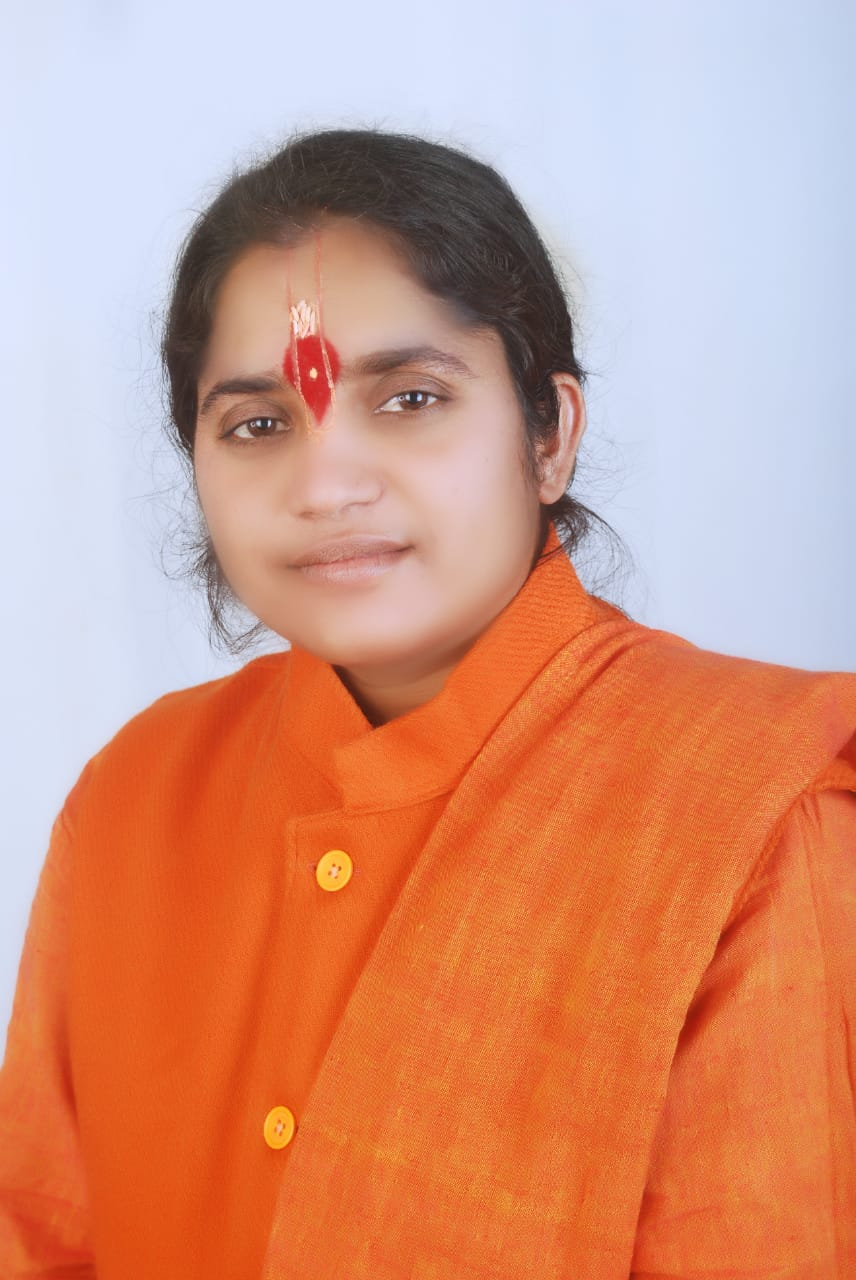
- Incumbent Ramsiya Bharti
- Party: Indian National Congress
- Elected year: 2023
- Preceded by: Pradyuman Singh Lodhi

Malhara Assembly constituency (formerly, Malehra) is one of the 230 Vidhan Sabha (Legislative Assembly) constituencies of Madhya Pradesh state in central India. This constituency came into existence in 1951, as one of the 48 Vidhan Sabha constituencies of the erstwhile Vindhya Pradesh state, but it was abolished in 1956. It again came into existence in 1961, following delimitation of the legislative assembly constituencies.

== Overview ==
Malhara (constituency number 53) is one of the 6 Vidhan Sabha constituencies located in Chhatarpur district. This constituency covers the entire Bada Malhera tehsil, Buxwaha nagar panchayat and part of Bijawar tehsil of the district.

Malhara is part of Damoh Lok Sabha constituency along with seven other Vidhan Sabha segments, namely, Deori, Rehli and Banda in Sagar district and Pathariya, Damoh, Jabera and Hatta in Damoh district.

== Members of Legislative Assembly ==
=== Vindhya Pradesh Legislative Assembly ===
Election	Name	Party
1952	Basant Lal	Indian National Congress

=== Madhya Pradesh Legislative Assembly ===
Election	Name	Party
1962	Hans Raj	Indian National Congress
1967	Govind Singh Judeo	Independent politician
1972	Dashrath	Indian National Congress
1977	Jang Bahadur Singh	Janata Party
1980	Kapur Chand Ghuwara	Communist Party of India
1985	Shivraj Singh Lodhi	Bharatiya Janata Party
1990	Ashok Kumar	Bharatiya Janata Party
1993	Uma Yadav	Indian National Congress
1998	Swami Prasad Lodhi	Bharatiya Janata Party
2003	Uma Bharti	Bharatiya Janata Party
2006 (Note: by-poll)	Kapur Chand Ghuwara	Bharatiya Janata Party
2008	Rekha Yadav	Bharatiya Janshakti Party
2013	Rekha Yadav	Bharatiya Janata Party
2018	Pradyuman Singh Lodhi	Indian National Congress
2020 (Note: by-poll)	Pradyuman Singh Lodhi	Bharatiya Janata Party
2023	Ramsiya Bharti	Indian National Congress

== Election results ==
=== 2023 ===
2023 Madhya Pradesh Legislative Assembly election: Malhara
Party	Candidate	Votes	%	±%
INC	Ramsiya Bharti	89,053	52.04	+18.64
BJP	Pradyuman Singh Lodhi	67,521	39.46	−5.68
Independent	Karan Singh Lodhi Sunwaha	4,220	2.47	
BSP	Lakhan Ramtoriya	1,860	1.09	−12.61
AAP	Chanda	1,751	1.02	+0.14
NOTA	None of the above	1,118	0.65	+0.30
Majority		21,532	12.58	+0.84
Turnout		171,115	73.51	+3.55
INC gain from BJP		Swing		

=== 2020 bypolls ===
2020 Madhya Pradesh Legislative Assembly by-elections: Malhara
Party	Candidate	Votes	%	±%
BJP	Pradyuman Singh Lodhi	67,532	45.14	+10.59
INC	Ramsiya Bharti	49,965	33.4	−11.76
BSP	Akhanad Pratap Singh Yadav	20,502	13.7	+3.63
Independent	Rajendra Jain Ghuwara	1,656	1.11	
NOTA	None of the above	518	0.35	−0.30
Majority		17,567	11.74	+1.13
Turnout		149,604	69.96	−1.90
BJP gain from INC		Swing		

=== 2018 ===
2018 Madhya Pradesh Legislative Assembly election: Malhara
Party	Candidate	Votes	%	±%
INC	Pradyuman Singh Lodhi	67,184	45.16	
BJP	Lalita Yadav	51,405	34.55	
BSP	Eng. Hari Krishna	14,922	10.03	
Independent	Sunil Kapoor Chandra Ghuwara	2,685	1.8	
Independent	Laxman Singh Thakur	2,187	1.47	
CPI	Raja Ram Vishvakarma Sendapa	1,902	1.28	
NOTA	None of the above	963	0.65	
Majority		15,779	10.61	
Turnout		148,782	71.86	
INC gain from BJP		Swing		

== See also ==
- Bakswaha
- Bada Malhara
