= Ajab Singh Kushwah =

Indian politician

Member of Legislative Assembly from Madhya Pradesh
- In office 2020–2023
- Preceded by: Adal Singh Kansana
- Constituency: Sumawali

Personal details
- Party: Bahujan Samaj Party
- Other political affiliations: Indian National Congress
- Spouse: Sheela Kushwah
- Children: 4
- Education: 12th Pass
- Profession: Politician
- As of 19 Mar, 2023 Source: ["Biography:Kushwah, Ajab Singh" (PDF). Madhya Pradesh Legislative Assembly.]

Ajab Singh Kushwah is an Indian politician from Madhya Pradesh. He is the Indian National Congress MLA of Sumawali state Assembly constituency.

== Political career ==
He was elected as an MLA for the first time in 2020 by-elections.
