= Sumawali Assembly constituency =

Constituency of the Madhya Pradesh legislative assembly

Coordinates: 26.71°N 78.23°E

Sumawali
- Constituency No. 5 for the Madhya Pradesh Legislative Assembly

Constituency details
- Country: India
- Region: Central India
- State: Madhya Pradesh
- District: Morena
- Lok Sabha constituency: Morena
- Established: 1976
- Reservation: None

Member of Legislative Assembly
- 16th Madhya Pradesh Legislative Assembly
- Incumbent Adal Singh Kansana
- Party: Bharatiya Janata Party
- Elected year: 2023
- Preceded by: Ajab Singh Kushwah

Sumawali Assembly constituency is one of the 230 Vidhan Sabha (Legislative Assembly) constituencies of Madhya Pradesh state in central India. This constituency came into existence in 1976, following the delimitation of the legislative assembly constituencies.

Sumawali (constituency number 5) is one of the six Vidhan Sabha constituencies located in Morena district. This constituency covers parts of Joura and Morena tehsils.

Sumawali is part of Morena Lok Sabha constituency.

== Members of Legislative Assembly ==
| Year | Member | Party |
|---|---|---|
| 1977 | Jahar Singh | Janata Party |
| 1980 | Yogender Singh | Bharatiya Janata Party |
| 1985 | Kirat Ram Singh Kansana | Indian National Congress |
| 1990 | Gajraj Singh Sikarwar | Janata Dal |
| 1993 | Adal Singh Kansana | Bahujan Samaj Party |
| 1998 | Adal Singh Kansana | Bahujan Samaj Party |
| 2003 | Gajraj Singh Sikarwar | Bharatiya Janata Party |
| 2008 | Adal Singh Kansana | Indian National Congress |
| 2013 | Satya Pal Singh | Bharatiya Janata Party |
| 2018 | Adal Singh Kansana | Indian National Congress |
| 2020 (Note: by-poll) | Ajab Singh Kushwah | Indian National Congress |
| 2023 | Adal Singh Kansana | Bharatiya Janata Party |

== Election results ==
=== 2023 ===
2023 Madhya Pradesh Legislative Assembly election: Sumawali
| Party | Candidate | Votes | % | ±% |
|---|---|---|---|---|
| BJP | Adal Singh Kansana | 72,508 | 38.95 | −6.20 |
| BSP | Kuldeep Singh Sikarwar | 56,500 | 30.35 | +28.29 |
| INC | Ajab Singh Kushwah | 55,289 | 29.7 | −21.95 |
| NOTA | None of the above | 562 | 0.3 | −0.13 |
| Majority | | 16,008 | 8.6 | +2.10 |
| Turnout | | 186,139 | 72.44 | +2.76 |
| BJP gain from INC | | Swing | | |

=== 2020 bypolls ===
2020 Madhya Pradesh Legislative Assembly by-elections: Sumawali
| Party | Candidate | Votes | % | ±% |
|---|---|---|---|---|
| INC | Ajab Singh Kushwah | 86,909 | 51.65 | +10.58 |
| BJP | Adal Singh Kansana | 75962 | 45.15 | +12.43 |
| BSP | Rahul Dandotiya | 3468 | 2.06 | −17.50 |
| NOTA | None of the above | 726 | 0.43 | −0.25 |
| Majority | | 10947 | 6.5 | −1.85 |
| Turnout | | 168250 | 69.68 | −2.02 |
| INC hold | | Swing | | |

=== 2018 ===
2018 Madhya Pradesh Legislative Assembly election: Sumawali
| Party | Candidate | Votes | % | ±% |
|---|---|---|---|---|
| INC | Adal Singh Kansana | 65,455 | 41.07 | |
| BJP | Ajab Singh Kushwah | 52,142 | 32.72 | |
| BSP | Gandhi Manvendra Singh | 31,331 | 19.66 | |
| SP | Sobran Singh Ghaletha | 6,873 | 4.31 | |
| NOTA | None of the above | 1,086 | 0.68 | |
| Majority | | 13,313 | 8.35 | |
| Turnout | | 159,367 | 71.7 | |
| INC gain from BJP | | Swing | | |

== See also ==
- Morena district
