= Mahendra Singh Sisodia =

Indian politician (born 1962)

Member of the Madhya Pradesh Legislative Assembly
- In office 2013–23
- Preceded by: Kanhaiyalal Rameshwar Agarwal
- Succeeded by: Rishi Agrawal
- Constituency: Bamori

Personal details
- Born: 30 August 1962 (age 64) Guna
- Party: Bharatiya Janata Party
- Spouse: Shivaraje Singh
- Parent: Rajendra Singh (father)
- Education: B. Sc.
- Profession: Agriculturist, politician
- As of 27 July 2018 Source: ["Biography" (PDF). Vidhan Sabha, Madhya Pradesh Legislative Assembly.]

Mahendra Singh Sisodia (born 30 August 1962) is an Indian politician and a member of the Bharatiya Janata Party. He is one of the 22 MLAs who resigned amid political crisis in Madhya Pradesh favouring Jyotiraditya Scindia.

== Political career ==
In December 2018, he was inducted into the Kamal Nath cabinet as Minister of Labour in Madhya Pradesh. During 2020 Madhya Pradesh political crisis, he supported senior Congress leader Jyotiraditya Scindia and was one of the 22 MLAs who resigned. He was inducted in fourth Shivraj cabinet as minister of rural development and panchayat.

== Personal life ==
He is married to Smt. Shivaraje Singh.

== See also ==
- Madhya Pradesh Legislative Assembly
- 2013 Madhya Pradesh Legislative Assembly election
- 2008 Madhya Pradesh Legislative Assembly election
