= Adal Singh Kansana =

Indian politician

Member of Madhya Pradesh Legislative Assembly
- Incumbent
- Assumed office 2023
- Preceded by: Satya Pal Singh
- Constituency: Sumawali

Personal details
- Party: Bharatiya Janata Party
- Other political affiliations: Indian National Congress

Adal Singh Kansana is an Indian politician. He was elected to the Madhya Pradesh Legislative Assembly from Sumawali. He was elected in Legislative Assembly Election again in 2023 and won from Sumawali. Currently, he has designation of Agriculture Minister, Madhya Pradesh Government. He was an elected member of the Madhya Pradesh Legislative Assembly in 1993 and 1998 as a member of the Bahujan Samaj Party and in 2008 and 2018 as a member of the Indian National Congress. During 2020 Madhya Pradesh political crisis, he supported senior Congress leader Jyotiraditya Scindia and was one of the 22 MLAs who resigned and later joined Bharatiya Janata Party.
