= Dabra Assembly constituency =

Constituency of the Madhya Pradesh legislative assembly in India

Coordinates: 25.89°N 78.33°E

Dabra
- Constituency No. 19 for the Madhya Pradesh Legislative Assembly

Constituency details
- Country: India
- Region: Central India
- State: Madhya Pradesh
- District: Gwalior
- Lok Sabha constituency: Gwalior
- Established: 1962
- Reservation: SC

Member of Legislative Assembly
- 16th Madhya Pradesh Legislative Assembly
- Incumbent Suresh Raje
- Party: Indian National Congress
- Elected year: 2023
- Preceded by: Imarti Devi

Dabra is one of the 230 Vidhan Sabha (Legislative Assembly) constituencies of Madhya Pradesh state in central India. It is a segment of Gwalior Lok Sabha constituency. This constituency is reserved for the candidates belonging to the Scheduled castes.

== Overview ==
Dabra (constituency number 19) is one of the 6 Vidhan Sabha constituencies located in Gwalior district. Presently, after the delimitation of the legislative assembly constituencies in 2008, this constituency covers the entire Dabra tehsil of the district. Before the delimitation, it covered the erstwhile Bhitarwar and Dabra R.I. Circles of the erstwhile Dabra tehsil.

It is a segment of Gwalior Lok Sabha constituency.

== Members of the Legislative Assembly ==
| Election | Member | Party |
|---|---|---|
| 1962 | Brinda Sahai | Indian National Congress |
| 1967 | Jaggannath Singh | Bharatiya Jana Sangh |
| 1972 | Pahad Singh | Indian National Congress |
| 1977 | Gopiram | Janata Party |
| 1980 | Jaggannath Singh | Bharatiya Janata Party |
| 1985 | Narsinghrao Pawar | Indian National Congress |
| 1990 | Narottam Mishra | Bharatiya Janata Party |
| 1993 | Jawahar Singh Rawat | Bahujan Samaj Party |
| 1998 | Narottam Mishra | Bharatiya Janata Party |
| 2003 | Narottam Mishra | Bharatiya Janata Party |
| 2008 | Imarti Devi | Indian National Congress |
| 2013 | Imarti Devi | Indian National Congress |
| 2018 | Imarti Devi | Indian National Congress |
| 2020^ | Suresh Raje | Indian National Congress |
| 2023 | Suresh Raje | Indian National Congress |

^ bypolls

== Election results ==
=== 2023 ===
2023 Madhya Pradesh Legislative Assembly election: Dabra
| Party | Candidate | Votes | % | ±% |
|---|---|---|---|---|
| INC | Suresh Raje | 84,717 | 48.08 | −1.40 |
| BJP | Imarti Devi | 82,450 | 46.79 | +2.30 |
| BSP | Satyaprakashi Parsediya | 4,437 | 2.52 | −0.67 |
| NOTA | None of the above | 1,564 | 0.89 | −0.21 |
| Majority | | 2,267 | 1.29 | −3.70 |
| Turnout | | 176,200 | 72.7 | +5.83 |
| INC hold | | Swing | | |

=== 2020 bypolls ===
2020 Madhya Pradesh Legislative Assembly by-elections: Dabra
| Party | Candidate | Votes | % | ±% |
|---|---|---|---|---|
| INC | Suresh Raje | 75,689 | 49.48 | −11.13 |
| BJP | Imarti Devi | 68056 | 44.49 | +22.31 |
| BSP | Santosh Gaur | 4883 | 3.19 | −5.61 |
| NOTA | None of the above | 1690 | 1.1 | −0.50 |
| Majority | | 7633 | 4.99 | −33.44 |
| Turnout | | 152978 | 66.87 | −1.66 |
| INC hold | | Swing | | |

=== 2018 ===
2018 Madhya Pradesh Legislative Assembly election: Dabra
| Party | Candidate | Votes | % | ±% |
|---|---|---|---|---|
| INC | Imarti Devi | 90,598 | 60.61 | |
| BJP | Kaptan Singh Sehsari | 33,152 | 22.18 | |
| BSP | P.S. Mandeliya | 13,155 | 8.8 | |
| Independent | Smt. Satya Prakashi Parsediya | 2,963 | 1.98 | |
| SS | Dinesh Kumar | 2,260 | 1.51 | |
| CPI(M) | Jitendra Arya | 1,559 | 1.04 | |
| AAP | Ramvati Shakya | 1,387 | 0.93 | |
| NOTA | None of the above | 2,389 | 1.6 | |
| Majority | | 57,446 | 38.43 | |
| Turnout | | 149,489 | 68.53 | |
| INC hold | | Swing | | |

=== 2013 ===
2013 Madhya Pradesh Legislative Assembly election: Bhitarwar
| Party | Candidate | Votes | % | ±% |
|---|---|---|---|---|
| INC | Imarti Devi | 67,764 | 52.77 | |
| BJP | Suresh Rajey | 34486 | 26.86 | |
| BSP | Satyaprakshi Parsediya | 19068 | 14.85 | |
| BA S D | Ajmer Singh Puri | 1557 | 1.21 | |
| Independent | Raguvir Singh Kori | 1273 | 0.99 | |
| NCP | Lakhan Singh Gautam | 707 | 0.55 | N/A |
| Independent | Anil Parseriyat | 439 | 0.34 | N/A |
| Independent | Ashok Kumar Paliya | 423 | 0.33 | N/A |
| SP | Balveer Khatik | 317 | 0.25 | N/A |
| NOTA | None of the Above | 2373 | 1.85 | |
| Majority | | 33278 | | |
| Turnout | | 128407 | 65.15 | |
| INC hold | | Swing | | |

=== 2008 ===
- Smt. Imarti Devi (INC) : 29,134 votes
- Hargovind Jauhari (BSP) : 18,504

=== 1962 ===
- Brinda Sahai (INC) : 12,695 votes
- Jagannath Singh (IND) : 10,562

== See also ==
- Dabra
- Gwalior district
- List of constituencies of the Madhya Pradesh Legislative Assembly
