= Anuppur Assembly constituency =

Constituency of the Madhya Pradesh legislative assembly in India

Coordinates: 23.12°N 81.70°E

Anuppur Vidhan Sabha
- Constituency No. 87 for the Madhya Pradesh Legislative Assembly

Constituency details
- Country: India
- Region: Central India
- State: Madhya Pradesh
- District: Anuppur
- Lok Sabha constituency: Shahdol
- Reservation: ST

Member of Legislative Assembly
- 16th Madhya Pradesh Legislative Assembly
- Incumbent Bisahulal Singh
- Party: Bharatiya Janata Party
- Elected year: 2023
- Preceded by: Ramlla Rautel

Anuppur is one of the 230 Vidhan Sabha (Legislative Assembly) constituencies of Madhya Pradesh state in central India. It is a segment of Shahdol (Lok Sabha constituency). As of 2023, its representative is Bisahulal Singh of the Bharatiya Janata Party.

== Members of the Legislative Assembly ==
| Election | Name | Party |
|---|---|---|
| 2008 | Bisahulal Singh | Indian National Congress |
| 2013 | Ramlal Rautel | Bharatiya Janata Party |
| 2018 | Bisahulal Singh | Indian National Congress |
| 2020 (Note: byelections) | Bisahulal Singh | Bharatiya Janata Party |
| 2023 | Bisahulal Singh | Bharatiya Janata Party |

== Election results ==
=== 2023 ===
2023 Madhya Pradesh Legislative Assembly election: Anuppur
| Party | Candidate | Votes | % | ±% |
|---|---|---|---|---|
| BJP | Bisahulal Singh | 77,110 | 55.13 | ▼4.79 |
| INC | Ramesh Kumar Singh | 56,691 | 40.53 | ▲8.24 |
| BSP | Sudama Kol | 2,480 | 1.77 | ▲0.40 |
| NOTA | None of the above | 2,162 | 1.55 | ▼0.39 |
| Majority | | 20,419 | 14.6 | ▲13.03 |
| Turnout | | 139,868 | 78.35 | ▲4.39 |
| BJP hold | | Swing | | |

=== 2020 bypolls ===
2020 Madhya Pradesh Legislative Assembly by-elections: Malhara
| Party | Candidate | Votes | % | ±% |
|---|---|---|---|---|
| BJP | Bisahulal Singh | 75,600 | 59.92 | +19.20 |
| INC | Vishvnath Singh | 40,736 | 32.29 | −17.62 |
| BSP | Sushil Singh Paraste | 1,731 | 1.37 | |
| CPI | Samar Shah Singh | 1,577 | 1.25 | |
| NOTA | None of the above | 2,447 | 1.94 | −0.23 |
| Majority | | 34,864 | 27.63 | +18.44 |
| Turnout | | 126,159 | 73.96 | −2.60 |
| BJP gain from INC | | Swing | | |

=== 2018 ===
2018 Madhya Pradesh Legislative Assembly election: Anuppur
| Party | Candidate | Votes | % | ±% |
|---|---|---|---|---|
| INC | Bisahulal Singh | 62,770 | 49.91 | |
| BJP | Bisahulal Singh | 51,209 | 40.72 | |
| Sapaks Party | Besahu Lal Rautel | 2,274 | 1.81 | |
| GGP | Birendra Singh Maravi | 1,721 | 1.37 | |
| Bhartiya Shakti Chetna Party | Kamla Prasad Baiga | 1,294 | 1.03 | |
| NOTA | None of the above | 2,730 | 2.17 | |
| Majority | | 11,561 | 9.19 | |
| Turnout | | 125,755 | 76.56 | |
| INC gain from BJP | | Swing | | |

== See also ==
- List of constituencies of the Madhya Pradesh Legislative Assembly
- Anuppur district
