= Pradyuman Singh Lodhi =

Indian politician

Member of Madhya Pradesh Legislative Assembly
- In office 2018–2023
- Preceded by: Rekha Yadav
- Succeeded by: Ramsiya Bharti
- Constituency: Malhara

Personal details
- Party: Bharatiya Janata Party
- Other political affiliations: Indian National Congress

Kunwar Pradyuman Singh Lodhi is an Indian Politician. He is a member and head of royal House of Hindoria and descendant of Raja Kishore Singh Lodhi of Hindoria who rebelled against Britishers in 1857. He was elected to the Madhya Pradesh Legislative Assembly from Malhara. He was an elected member of the Madhya Pradesh Legislative Assembly as a member of the Indian National Congress. He left the Indian National Congress in July 2020 and on the same day, he joined Bharatiya Janata Party. BJP announced as Candidate for assembly election 2023.
