= 2009 Indian general election in Madhya Pradesh =

Indian general election in Madhya Pradesh, 2009
- April–May 2009

29 seats
- Turnout: 51.17%

	First party	Second party	Third party
Party	BJP	INC	BSP
Alliance	NDA	UPA	TF
Last election	25 seats, 48.13%	4 seats, 34.07%	0 seats, 4.75%
Seats won	16	12	1
Seat change	▼9	▲8	▲1
Percentage	43.45%	40.14%	5.85%%
Swing	▼4.68%	▲6.07%	▲1.1%
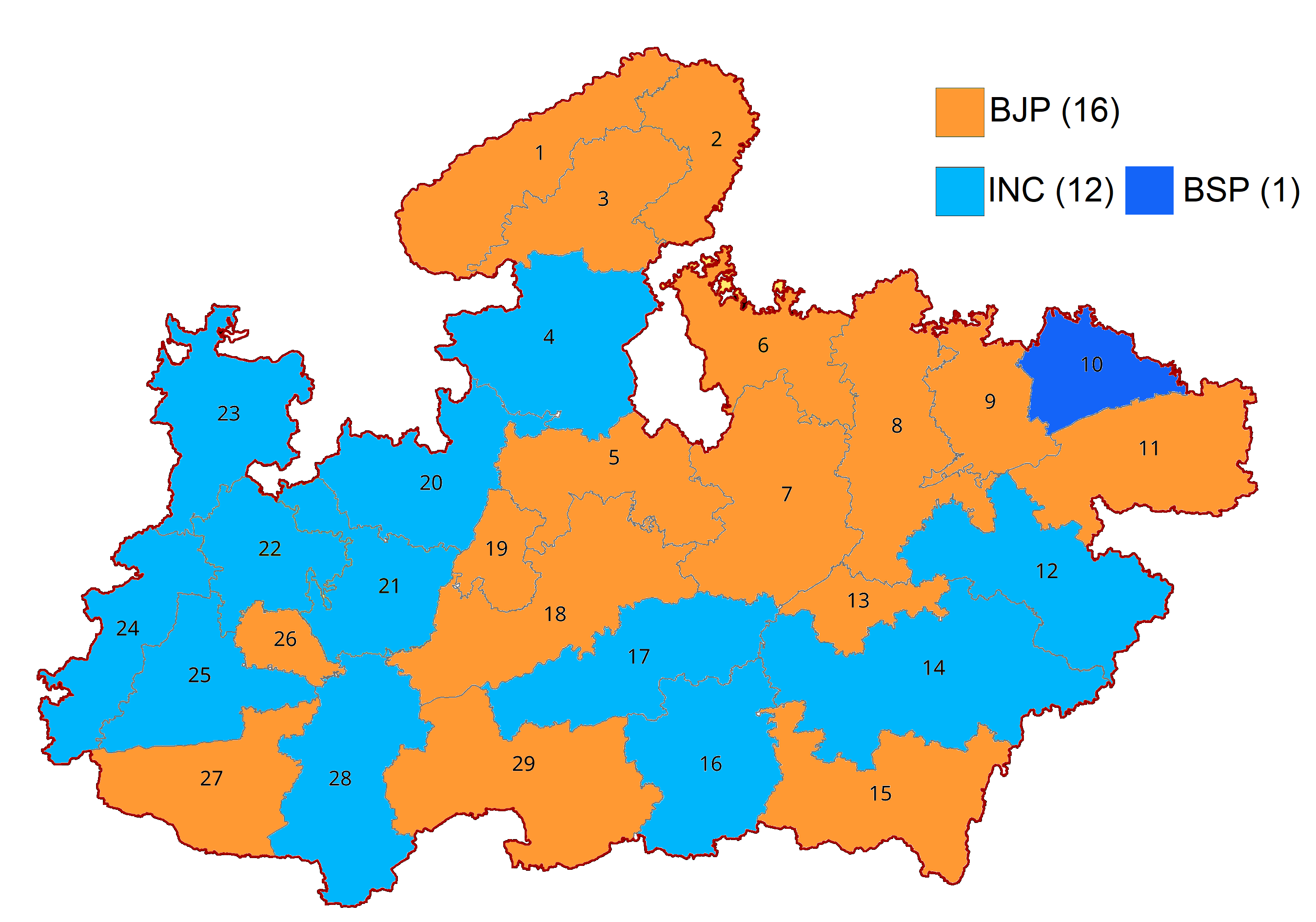
- Madhya Pradesh
Prime Minister before election
Manmohan Singh
INC
Prime Minister after election
Manmohan Singh
INC

The 2009 Indian general election for Madhya Pradesh polls were held for 29 seats in the state. The major two contenders in the state were Bharatiya Janta Party (BJP) and the Indian National Congress (INC). The BJP was expected to perform well as it had won the assembly elections conducted in the state during November–December 2008.

== Parties and alliances ==
=== National Democratic Alliance ===
Party	Flag	Symbol	Leader	Seats contested
Bharatiya Janata Party			Shivraj Singh Chouhan	29

=== United Progressive Alliance ===
Party	Flag	Symbol	Leader	Seats contested
Indian National Congress			Jyotiraditya Scindia	28

=== Others ===
Party	Flag	Symbol	Leader	Seats contested
Bahujan Samaj Party			Mayawati	28
Samajwadi Party			Mulayam Singh Yadav	18

== List of candidates ==
Constituency		INC		BJP		BSP		SP	
No.	Name	Party	Candidate	Party	Candidate	Party	Candidate	Party	Candidate
1	Morena	INC	Ramnivas Rawat	BJP	Narendra Singh Tomar	BSP	Balveer Singh Dandotiya	SP	Ad. Baijnath Kushwaha
2	Bhind	INC	Bhagirath Prasad	BJP	Ashok Argal	BSP	D.R. Rahul	SP	Nand Kishor Kori
3	Gwalior	INC	Ashok Singh	BJP	Yashodhara Raje Scindia	BSP	Ajab Singh Kushwah	Did not contest	
4	Guna	INC	Jyotiraditya Madhavrao Scindia	BJP	Dr. Narottam Mishra	BSP	Lokpal Lodhi	Did not contest	
5	Sagar	INC	Aslam Sher Khan	BJP	Bhupendra Singh	BSP	Ahirwar Naresh Boudha	SP	Gouri Singh Yadav
6	Tikamgarh	INC	Ahirwar Vrindavan	BJP	Virendra Kumar	BSP	G.D.	SP	Chintaman Kori Rampuriya
7	Damoh	INC	Chandrabhan Bhaiya	BJP	Shivraj Bhaiya	Did not contest		SP	Ahir Kamla Yadav
8	Khajuraho	INC	Raja Paterya	BJP	Jeetendra Singh Bundela	BSP	Sewa Lal Patel	SP	Jayawant Singh
9	Satna	INC	Sudhir Singh Tomar	BJP	Ganesh Singh	BSP	Sukhlal Kushwaha	SP	Pt. Rajaram Tripathi
10	Rewa	INC	Sunder Lal Tiwari	BJP	Chandramani Tripathi	BSP	Deoraj Singh Patel	SP	Pushpraj Singh
11	Sidhi	INC	Indrajeet Kumar	BJP	Govind Prasad Mishra	BSP	Ashok Kumar Shah	SP	Manik Singh
12	Shahdol	INC	Rajesh Nandini Singh	BJP	Narendra Singh Maravi	BSP	Manohar Singh Maravi	SP	Chandra Pratap Singh (Baba Sahab)
13	Jabalpur	INC	Rameshwar Neekhra	BJP	Rakesh Singh	BSP	Aziz Qureshi	SP	Ashok Kumar Sharma
14	Mandla	INC	Basori Singh Masram	BJP	Faggan Singh Kulaste	BSP	Jalso Dhurwey	Did not contest	
15	Balaghat	INC	Vishveshwar Bhagat	BJP	K. D. Deshmukh	BSP	Ajab Lal	SP	Kishor Samrite
16	Chhindwara	INC	Kamal Nath	BJP	Marot Rao Khavase	BSP	Rao Saheb Shinde	Did not contest	
17	Hoshangabad	INC	Uday Pratap Singh	BJP	Rampal Singh	BSP	Adv. B. M. Kaushik	SP	Hajee Syid Mueen Uddin
18	Vidisha	Did not contest		BJP	Sushma Swaraj	BSP	Dr. Premshankar Sharma	SP	Munvvar Saleem
19	Bhopal	INC	Surendra Singh Thakur	BJP	Kailash Chandra Joshi	BSP	Er. Ashok Narayan Singh	SP	Mhod. Munawar Khan Kausar
20	Rajgarh	INC	Narayan Singh Amlabe	BJP	Lakshman Singh	BSP	Shivnarayan Ahirwar	Did not contest	
21	Dewas	INC	Sajjan Singh Verma	BJP	Thawar Chand Gehlot	BSP	Bhagirath Parihar	Did not contest	
22	Ujjain	INC	Premchand Guddu	BJP	Satyanarayan Jatiya	BSP	Baboolal Thawaliya	Did not contest	
23	Mandsour	INC	Meenakshi Natrajan	BJP	Laxminarayan Pandey	BSP	Bherulal Malviy (Balai)	Did not contest	
24	Ratlam	INC	Kantilal Bhuria	BJP	Dileep Singh Bhuria	BSP	Ramesh Solanki	SP	Jeevanlal
25	Dhar	INC	Gajendra Singh Rajukhedi	BJP	Mukam Singh Kirade	BSP	Ajay Rawat	Did not contest	
26	Indore	INC	Satyanarayan Patel	BJP	Sumitra Mahajan (Tai)	BSP	Rahim Khan	SP	Dr. Anita Yadav
27	Khargone	INC	Balaram Bachchan	BJP	Makhansingh Solanki	BSP	D. R. Barde	Did not contest	
28	Khandwa	INC	Arun Subhashchandra Yadav	BJP	Nandkumar Singh Chauhan	BSP	Dada Saheb Wamanrao Sasane	Did not contest	
29	Betul	INC	Ojharam Evane	BJP	Jyoti Dhurve	BSP	Rama Kakodia	SP	Dr. Sukhdev Singh Chouhan

== Voting and results ==
The Bharatiya Janta Party (BJP) won 16 seats, Indian National Congress (INC) won 12 seats, and the Bahujan Samaj Party won one seat.

== Result by party ==
Results of Indian general election, 2009 in Madhya Pradesh
Parties and coalitions	Seats			Popular vote		
Parties and coalitions	Contested	Won	+/−	Votes	%	±pp
Bharatiya Janata Party	29	16	▼9	84,65,524	43.45%	▼4.68%
Indian National Congress	29	12	▲8	78,20,333	40.14%	▲6.07%
Bahujan Samaj Party	28	1	▲1	11,40,044	5.85%	▲1.1%
Samajwadi Party	18	0	-	5,51,341	2.82%	▼0.38%
Gondwana Ganatantra Party	13	0	-	1,20,182	0.62%	▼2.43%
Independents	213	0	-	9,57,495	4.91%	▲0.89%
Total	29			1,94,84,608		
Valid votes	1,94,84,608	99.97				
Votes cast / turnout	1,94,88,914	51.17				
Abstentions	1,85,96,265	48.83				
Registered voters	3,80,85,179	100.0				

Source: Election Commission of India

=== Constituency-wise results ===
Keys: BJP (16) INC (12) BSP (1)

Constituency		Winner				Runner up				Margin	%
#	Name	Candidate	Party	Votes	%	Candidate	Party	Votes	%	Margin	%
1	Morena	Narendra Singh Tomar	BJP	3,00,647	42.30	Ramniwas Rawat	INC	1,99,650	28.09	1,00,997	14.21
2	Bhind (SC)	Ashok Argal	BJP	2,27,365	43.41	Bhagirath Prasad	INC	2,08,479	39.80	18,886	3.61
3	Gwalior	Yashodhara Scindia	BJP	2,52,314	43.19	Ashok Singh	INC	2,25,723	38.64	26,591	4.55
4	Guna	Jyotiraditya Scindia	INC	4,13,297	63.60	Narottam Mishra	BJP	1,63,560	25.17	2,49,737	38.43
5	Sagar	Bhupendra Singh	BJP	3,23,954	56.80	Aslam Sher Khan	INC	1,92,786	33.80	1,31,168	23.00
6	Tikamgarh (SC)	Virendra Khatik	BJP	2,00,109	38.10	Ahirwar Vrindavan	INC	1,58,247	30.13	41,862	7.97
7	Damoh	Shivraj Lodhi	BJP	3,02,673	50.52	Chandrabhan Bhaiya	INC	2,31,796	38.69	70,877	11.83
8	Khajuraho	Jeetendra Bundela	BJP	2,29,369	39.34	Raja Paterya	INC	2,01,037	34.48	28,332	4.86
9	Satna	Ganesh Singh	BJP	1,94,624	29.51	Sukhlal Kushwaha	BSP	1,90,206	28.84	4,418	0.67
10	Rewa	Deoraj Singh Patel	BSP	1,72,002	28.49	Sunder Lal Tiwari	INC	1,67,981	27.83	4,021	0.66
11	Sidhi	Govind Prasad Mishra	BJP	2,70,914	40.09	Indrajeet Kumar	INC	2,25,174	33.32	45,740	6.77
12	Shahdol (ST)	Rajesh Nandini Singh	INC	2,63,434	41.86	Narendra Singh Maravi	BJP	2,50,019	39.73	13,415	2.13
13	Jabalpur	Rakesh Singh	BJP	3,43,922	54.29	Rameshwar Neekhra	INC	2,37,919	37.56	1,06,003	16.73
14	Mandla (ST)	Basori Singh Masram	INC	3,91,133	45.50	Faggan Singh Kulaste	BJP	3,26,080	37.94	65,053	7.56
15	Balaghat	K. D. Deshmukh	BJP	2,99,959	39.65	Vishveshwar Bhagat	INC	2,59,140	34.25	40,819	5.40
16	Chhindwara	Kamal Nath	INC	4,09,736	49.41	Marot Rao Khavase	BJP	2,88,516	34.79	1,21,220	14.62
17	Hoshangabad	Uday Pratap Singh	INC	3,39,496	47.73	Rampal Singh	BJP	3,20,251	45.03	19,245	2.70
18	Vidisha	Sushma Swaraj	BJP	4,38,235	78.80	Munvvar Saleem	SP	48,391	8.70	3,89,844	70.10
19	Bhopal	Kailash Joshi	BJP	3,35,678	50.95	Surendra Thakur	INC	2,70,521	41.06	65,157	9.89
20	Rajgarh	Narayan Amlabe	INC	3,19,371	49.11	Lakshman Singh	BJP	2,94,983	45.36	24,388	3.75
21	Dewas (SC)	Sajjan Singh Verma	INC	3,76,421	48.08	Thawar Chand Gehlot	BJP	3,60,964	46.10	15,457	1.98
22	Ujjain (SC)	Premchand Guddu	INC	3,26,905	48.97	Satyanarayan Jatiya	BJP	3,11,064	46.60	15,841	2.37
23	Mandsaur	Meenakshi Natarajan	INC	3,73,532	48.80	Laxminarayan Pandey	BJP	3,42,713	44.77	30,819	4.03
24	Ratlam (ST)	Kantilal Bhuria	INC	3,08,923	48.46	Dileep Bhuria	BJP	2,51,255	39.42	57,668	9.04
25	Dhar (ST)	Gajendra Rajukhedi	INC	3,02,660	46.23	Mukam Singh Kirade	BJP	2,99,999	45.82	2,661	0.41
26	Indore	Sumitra Mahajan	BJP	3,88,662	48.77	Satyanarayan Patel	INC	3,77,182	47.33	11,480	1.44
27	Khargone (ST)	Makhansingh Solanki	BJP	3,51,296	46.19	Bala Bachchan	INC	3,17,121	41.70	34,175	4.49
28	Khandwa	Arun Yadav	INC	3,94,241	48.53	Nandkumar Chauhan	BJP	3,45,160	42.49	49,081	6.04
29	Betul (ST)	Jyoti Dhurve	BJP	3,34,939	52.62	Ojharam Evane	INC	2,37,622	37.33	97,317	15.29

== Post-election Union Council of Ministers from Madhya Pradesh ==
=== Cabinet ministers ===
S No.	Minister	Party	Lok Sabha seat/Rajya Sabha	Portfolios	Term start	Term end
1.	Kamal Nath	Indian National Congress	Chhindwara	Minister of Road Transport and Highways	28 May 2009	19 Jan 2011
1.	Kamal Nath	Indian National Congress	Chhindwara	Minister of Urban Development	19 Jan 2011	26 May 2014
1.	Kamal Nath	Indian National Congress	Chhindwara	Minister of Parliamentary Affairs	28 Oct 2012	26 May 2014
2.	Kantilal Bhuria	Indian National Congress	Ratlam	Minister of Tribal Affairs	28 May 2009	12 July 2012
4.	Jyotiraditya Scindia	Indian National Congress	Guna	Minister of Power	28 Oct 2012	26 May 2014

=== Minister of state ===
S No.	Minister	Party	Lok Sabha seat/Rajya Sabha	Portfolios	Term start	Term end
1.	Jyotiraditya Scindia	Indian National Congress	Guna	Minister of State in the Ministry of Commerce and Industry	28 May 2009	28 Oct 2012
2.	Arun Yadav	Indian National Congress	Khandwa	Minister of State in the Ministry of Youth Affairs and Sports	28 May 2009	14 June 2009
2.	Arun Yadav	Indian National Congress	Khandwa	Minister of State in the Ministry of Heavy Industries and Public Enterprises	14 June 2009	19 Jan 2011
2.	Arun Yadav	Indian National Congress	Khandwa	Minister of State in the Ministry of Agriculture and Food Processing Industries	19 Jan 2011	14 July 2011

== Assembly segments wise lead of parties ==
Party	Assembly segments	Position in Assembly (as of 2013 election)
Bharatiya Janata Party	122	165
Indian National Congress	100	58
Bahujan Samaj Party	7	4
Samajwadi Party	1	0
Others	0	3
Total	230	
