= 2004 Indian general election in Madhya Pradesh =

Indian general election in Madhya Pradesh, 2004
- April–May 2004

29 seats

	First party	Second party
Leader	Sadhvi Pragya	Jyotiraditya Scindia
Party	BJP	INC
Leader's seat		Guna
Seats before	21	8
Seats won	25	4
Seat change	▲4	▼4
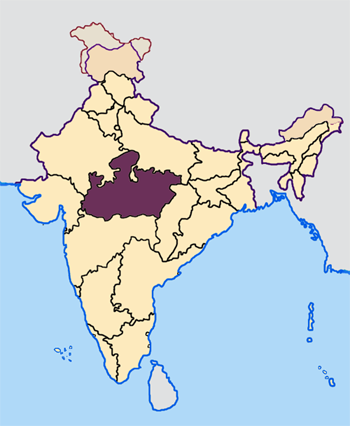
- Madhya Pradesh
Prime Minister before election
Atal Bihari Vajpayee
BJP
Prime Minister after election
Manmohan Singh
INC

In the 2004 Indian general election for Madhya Pradesh polls were held for 29 seats in the state. The result was a major victory for the Bharatiya Janata Party (BJP) which won 25 seats. The remaining 4 seats were won by Indian National Congress (INC).

== Parties and alliances ==
=== National Democratic Alliance ===
Party	Flag	Symbol	Leader	Seats contested
Bharatiya Janata Party			Sadhvi Pragya	29

=== United Progressive Alliance ===
Party	Flag	Symbol	Leader	Seats contested
Indian National Congress			Jyotiraditya Scindia	29

=== Others ===
Party	flag	Symbol	Leader	Seats contested
Samajwadi Party			Mulayam Singh Yadav	29
Bahujan Samaj Party			Mayawati	28

== List of Candidates ==
Constituency		BJP		INC		BSP		SP	
#	Name	Party	Candidate	Party	Candidate	Party	Candidate	Party	Candidate
1	Morena (SC)	BJP	Ashok Argal	INC	Barelal Jatav	BSP	Pritam Prasad Ch.	SP	Shankar Lal Mourya
2	Bhind	BJP	Ram Lakhan Singh	INC	Satyadev Katare	BSP	Ramsingh Dhakre	SP	Narendra Bhadoria
3	Gwalior	BJP	Jaibhan Pawaiya	INC	Ramsevak Singh	BSP	Madan Kushwah	SP	Khyaliram Baghel
4	Guna	BJP	Harivallabh Shukla	INC	Jyotiraditya Scindia	BSP	Ramvilas Kirar	SP	Usha Yadav
5	Sagar (SC)	BJP	Virendra Kumar	INC	Uttam Khatik	BSP	Naresh Ahirwar	SP	Parvati Ahirwar
6	Khajuraho	BJP	Ramkrishna Kusmaria	INC	Satyavrat Chaturvedi	BSP	Brijmohan Kushwaha	SP	Ashok Vir Vikram
7	Damoh	BJP	Chandrabhan Bhaiya	INC	Tilak Singh Lodhi	BSP	Ramkishore Yadav	SP	Kunvar Vijay Bahadur
8	Satna	BJP	Ganesh Singh	INC	Rajendra Kumar Singh	BSP	Ku. Narendra Singh	SP	Narayan Tripathi
9	Rewa	BJP	Chandramani Tripathi	INC	Sundar Lal Tiwari	BSP	Pradeep Kumar Patel	SP	Indrabhan Yadav
10	Sidhi (ST)	BJP	Chandrapratap Singh	INC	Tilakraj Singh	BSP	Harikrishna Panika	SP	Patiraj
11	Shahdol (ST)	BJP	Dalpat Singh Paraste	INC	Rajesh Nandani Singh	BSP	Ramlal	SP	Chhotelal Singh
12	Balaghat	BJP	Gaurishankar Bisen	INC	Pushpa Bisen	BSP	Udaysingh Pancheshwar	SP	Kishor Samrite
13	Mandla (ST)	BJP	Faggan Kulaste	INC	Savitri Dhumketi	BSP	Inder Singh Uikey	SP	Manoj Gothiya
14	Jabalpur	BJP	Rakesh Singh	INC	Vishwanath Dubey	BSP	Braj Kishore Kewat	SP	Rajesh Dixit
15	Seoni	BJP	Neeta Pateriya	INC	Kalyani Pandey	BSP	L. K. Deshbhartar	SP	Sawitri Rao
16	Chhindwara	BJP	Prahlad Singh Patel	INC	Kamal Nath	BSP	Dalchand Pal	SP	Jaydeep Deepa Yadav
17	Betul	BJP	Vijay Khandelwal	INC	Rajendra Jaiswal	BSP	Bindiya Dashryamkar	SP	Sunilam
18	Hoshangabad	BJP	Sartaj Singh	INC	Omprakash Raghuvanshi	BSP	Rajendra Raghuvanshi	SP	Padmini Yadav
19	Bhopal	BJP	Kailash Joshi	INC	Sajid Ali	BSP	G. S. Chawala	SP	Pramod Gupta
20	Vidisha	BJP	Shivraj Singh Chouhan	INC	Narbada Prasad Sharma	BSP	Khuman Singh Kushwah	SP	Ch. Munavvar Salim
21	Rajgarh	BJP	Lakshman Singh	INC	Shambhoo Singh	BSP	Shobhna Yadav	SP	Pandit Prakash Paliwal
22	Shajapur (SC)	BJP	Thawar Chand Gehlot	INC	Shyam Bapulal Malviya	BSP	Mohanlal Bhaiyya	SP	Motilal Malviya
23	Khandwa	BJP	Nandkumar Chauhan	INC	Amitabh Mandloi	BSP	Ramgopal Yadav	SP	Sonia Sharma
24	Khargone	BJP	Krishna Murari Moghe	INC	Tarachand Shivaji Patel	BSP	Bhagwan-Badole	SP	Kashiram Yadav
25	Dhar (ST)	BJP	Chhatar Singh Darbar	INC	Umang Singhar	BSP	Shripal Singh Darbar	SP	Mohan Singh Dawar
26	Indore	BJP	Sumitra Mahajan	INC	Rameshwar Patel	BSP	Kailashchander Sahu	SP	Rajendra Yadav
27	Ujjain (SC)	BJP	Satyanarayan Jatiya	INC	Premchand Guddu	BSP	Babulal Thawlia	SP	Sitaram Gujrati
28	Jhabua (ST)	BJP	Relam Chauhan	INC	Kantilal Bhuria	BSP	Jalamsingh Patel	SP	Susheela Maida
29	Mandsaur	BJP	Laxminarayan Pandey	INC	Rajendra Singh Gautam			SP	Ramsingh Gujarbardiya

== Result ==
Results of Indian general election, 2004 in Madhya Pradesh
Parties and coalitions	Seats			Popular vote		
Parties and coalitions	Contested	Won	+/−	Votes	%	±pp
Bharatiya Janata Party	29	25	▲4	88,84,913	48.13%	▲4.02%
Indian National Congress	29	4	▼4	62,89,013	34.07%	▼10.04%
Bahujan Samaj Party	28	0	-	8,76,871	4.75%	▼0.56%
Samajwadi Party	29	0	-	5,90,090	3.2%	▲1.41%
Gondwana Ganatantra Party	15	0	-	5,63,676	3.05%	▲2.81%
Communist Party of India	2	0	-	43,462	0.24%	-
Independents	124	0	-	7,42,198	4.02%	-
Total	29			1,84,59,240		
Valid votes	1,84,59,240	99.97				
Votes cast / turnout	1,84,63,451	48.09				
Abstentions	1,99,26,650	51.91				
Registered voters	3,83,90,101	100.00				

=== Constituency-wise results ===
Keys: BJP (25) INC (4)

Parliamentary Constituency			Turnout	Winner				Runner-up				Margin	
No.	Name	Type	Turnout	Candidate	Party	Votes	Vote%	Candidate	Party	Votes	Vote%	Votes	%
1.	Morena	SC	33.97	Ashok Argal	BJP	2,61,337		Barelal Jatav	INC	1,14,017		1,47,320	30.22
2.	Bhind	GEN	43.68	Ramlakhan Singh	BJP	2,34,712		Satyadev Katare	INC	2,27,766		6,946	1.15
3.	Gwalior	GEN	40.88	Ramsevak Singh	INC	2,46,467		Jaibhan Singh Pawaiya	BJP	2,10,603		35,864	6.35
4.	Guna	GEN	47.02	Jyotiraditya Scindia	INC	3,33,954		Hari Vallabh Shukla	BJP	2,47,594		86,360	12.92
5.	Sagar	SC	38.34	Virendra Kumar	BJP	2,90,974		Uttamchand Khatik	INC	1,42,983		1,47,991	30.87
6.	Khajuraho	GEN	49.78	Ramkrishna Kusmaria	BJP	3,32,458		Satyavrat Chaturvedi	INC	2,20,677		1,11,781	14.47
7.	Damoh	GEN	42.28	Chandrabhan Bhaiya	BJP	2,71,869		Tilak Singh Lodhi	INC	1,72,274		94,595	16.0
8.	Satna	GEN	46.11	Ganesh Singh	BJP	2,39,706		Rajendra Kumar Singh	INC	1,56,116		83,590	13.69
9.	Rewa	GEN	43.17	Chandramani Tripathi	BJP	2,32,021		Pradeep Kumar Patel	BSP	1,87,269		44,752	7.1
10.	Sidhi	ST	42.19	Chandrapratap Singh	BJP	2,10,198		Tilakraj Singh	INC	1,60,633		49,565	10.84
11.	Shahdol	ST	39.03	Dalpat Singh Paraste	BJP	2,10,034		Rajesh Nandini Singh	INC	1,80,685		29,349	5.76
12.	Balaghat	GEN	60.92	Gaurishankar Bisen	BJP	1,93,982		Kankar Munjare	JP	1,05,893		88,089	14.46
13.	Mandla	ST	53.72	Faggan Singh Kulaste	BJP	2,38,073		Heera Singh Markam	GGP	1,73,176		64,897	11.03
14.	Jabalpur	GEN	42.49	Rakesh Singh	BJP	3,11,646		Rameshwar Neekhra	INC	2,12,115		99,531	17.42
15.	Seoni	GEN	49.82	Neeta Pateriya	BJP	2,68,195		Kalyani Pandey	INC	1,73,394		94,801	15.81
16.	Chhindwara	GEN	65.92	Kamal Nath	INC	3,08,563		Prahlad Singh Patel	BJP	2,44,855		63,708	8.44
17.	Betul	GEN	48.78	Vijay Kumar Khandelwal	BJP	2,88,007		Rajendra Jaiswal	INC	1,30,467		1,57,540	28.76
18.	Hoshangabad	GEN	49.29	Sartaj Singh	BJP	3,54,659		Omprakash Raghuvanshi	INC	2,18,250		1,36,409	21.5
19.	Bhopal	GEN	46.47	Kailash Joshi	BJP	5,61,563		Sajid Ali	INC	2,55,558		3,06,005	35.65
20.	Vidisha	GEN	50.01	Shivraj Singh Chouhan	BJP	4,28,030		Narbada Prasad Sharma	INC	1,67,304		2,60,726	39.71
21.	Rajgarh	GEN	46.88	Lakshman Singh	BJP	2,83,135		Shambhoo Singh	INC	2,46,423		36,712	6.13
22.	Shajapur	SC	54.21	Thawarchand Gehlot	BJP	4,24,004		Shyam Malviya	INC	2,55,817		1,68,187	23.35
23.	Khandwa	GEN	49.71	Nand Kumar Singh Chauhan	BJP	3,36,724		Amitabh Mandloi	INC	2,33,987		1,02,737	16.97
24.	Khargone	GEN	50.67	Krishna Murari Moghe	BJP	3,21,762		Tarachand Patel	INC	2,63,145		58,617	8.99
25.	Dhar	ST	53.07	Chhatar Singh Darbar	BJP	3,45,468		Umang Singhar	INC	3,12,857		32,611	4.64
26.	Indore	GEN	50.92	Sumitra Mahajan	BJP	5,08,107		Rameshwar Patel	INC	3,14,171		1,93,936	22.7
27.	Ujjain	SC	57.97	Satyanarayan Jatiya	BJP	3,69,744		Guddu Premchand	INC	2,99,341		70,403	9.77
28.	Jhabua	SC	48.75	Kantilal Bhuria	INC	3,22,257		Relam Chauhan	BJP	2,41,975		80,282	12.77
29.	Mandsour	GEN	56.53	Laxminarayan Pandey	BJP	4,23,478		Rajendra Singh Gautam	INC	2,83,845		1,39,633	17.98

== Post-election Union Council of Ministers from Madhya Pradesh ==
=== Cabinet Ministers ===
S No.	Minister	Party	Lok Sabha Seat/Rajya Sabha	Portfolios	Term Start	Term End
1.	Arjun Singh	Indian National Congress	Rajya Sabha	Minister of Human Resource Development	23 May 2004	22 May 2009
2.	Kamal Nath	Indian National Congress	Chhindwara	Minister of Commerce and Industry	23 May 2004	22 May 2009
3.	H. R. Bhardwaj	Indian National Congress	Rajya Sabha	Minister of Law and Justice	23 May 2004	22 May 2009

=== Minister of State ===
S No.	Minister	Party	Lok Sabha Seat/Rajya Sabha	Portfolios	Term Start	Term End
1.	Suresh Pachouri	Indian National Congress	Rajya Sabha	Minister of State in the Ministry of Personnel, Public Grievances and Pensions	28 May 2004	6 April 2008
1.	Suresh Pachouri	Indian National Congress	Rajya Sabha	Minister of State in the Ministry of Parliamentary Affairs	28 May 2004	6 April 2008
2.	Kantilal Bhuria	Indian National Congress	Jhabua	Minister of State in the Ministry of Agriculture; Minister of State in the Ministry of Food and Civil Supplies, Consumer Affairs and Public Distribution	23 May 2004	22 May 2009
3.	Jyotiraditya Scindia	Indian National Congress	Guna	Minister of State in the Ministry of Communications and Information Technology	6 April 2008	22 May 2009

== Assembly segments wise lead of Parties ==
Party	Assembly segments	Position in Assembly (as of 2008 election)
Bharatiya Janata Party	187	143
Indian National Congress	38	71
Bahujan Samaj Party	2	7
Gondwana Ganatantra Party	2	0
Jharkhand Party	1	0
Others	0	9
Total	230	
