= Baboolal Mewra =

Indian politician

- बाबूलाल मेवरा
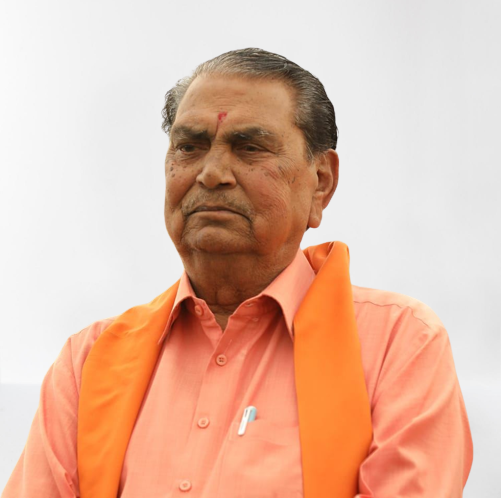
- Baboolal Mewra during his election campaign of 2023 Madhya Pradesh Assembly Elections.

Member of the Madhya Pradesh Legislative Assembly
- In office 1998–2003
- Preceded by: Ramnivas Rawat
- Succeeded by: Ramnivas Rawat
- Constituency: Vijaypur
- In office 1985–1990
- Preceded by: Jagmohan Singh
- Succeeded by: Ramnivas Rawat

State Minister of the Government of Madhya Pradesh
- In office 2010–2013
- Vice President: Madhya Pradesh Rajya Van Vikas Nigam Limited, Bhopal

Personal details
- Born: 4 November 1945 (age 80) Vijaypur, Gwalior Residency, British India
- Citizenship: Indian
- Party: Bharatiya Janta Party
- Spouse: Doli Mewra
- Children: Mahesh Mewra and Radheshyam Mewra
- Occupation: Politician
- Profession: Farmer
- https://mpvidhansabha.nic.in/11thvs/11-2.pdf
- As of 11 November, 2023 Source: ["Biography" (PDF). Vidhan Sabha, Madhya Pradesh Legislative Assembly.]

Baboolal Mewra (born 4 November 1945) is an Indian politician and Bharatiya Janata Party leader. He was elected as Member of the Legislative Assembly two-times (1985 and 1998) from Vijaypur, Madhya Pradesh Assembly constituency. He also served as vice-president of Madhya Pradesh Rajya Van Vikas Nigam Limited and held Minister of State rank from 2010 to 2013 under the cabinet of Shivraj Singh Chauhan. He spent two years in prison under the Maintenance of Internal Security Act for protesting against imposition of the emergency in India. He has been appointed as the State Executive Member and Chambal Division In-Charge of the Loktantra Senani Sangh, Madhya Pradesh.

== Personal life ==
Baboolal Mewra was born on 4 November 1945 to Shridhar Lal Mewra and Sukhdevi Bai in Mewra village, Vijaypur in Madhya Pradesh. He was married to Shrimati Doli Mewra with whom he has two sons namely Mahesh Mewra and Radheshyam Mewra. Mewra Ji's two grandsons Advocate Atul Mewra (Sadhu) and Nishant Mewra (Rishi) are politically active to take forward the political legacy of the Mewra Family.

== Political career ==
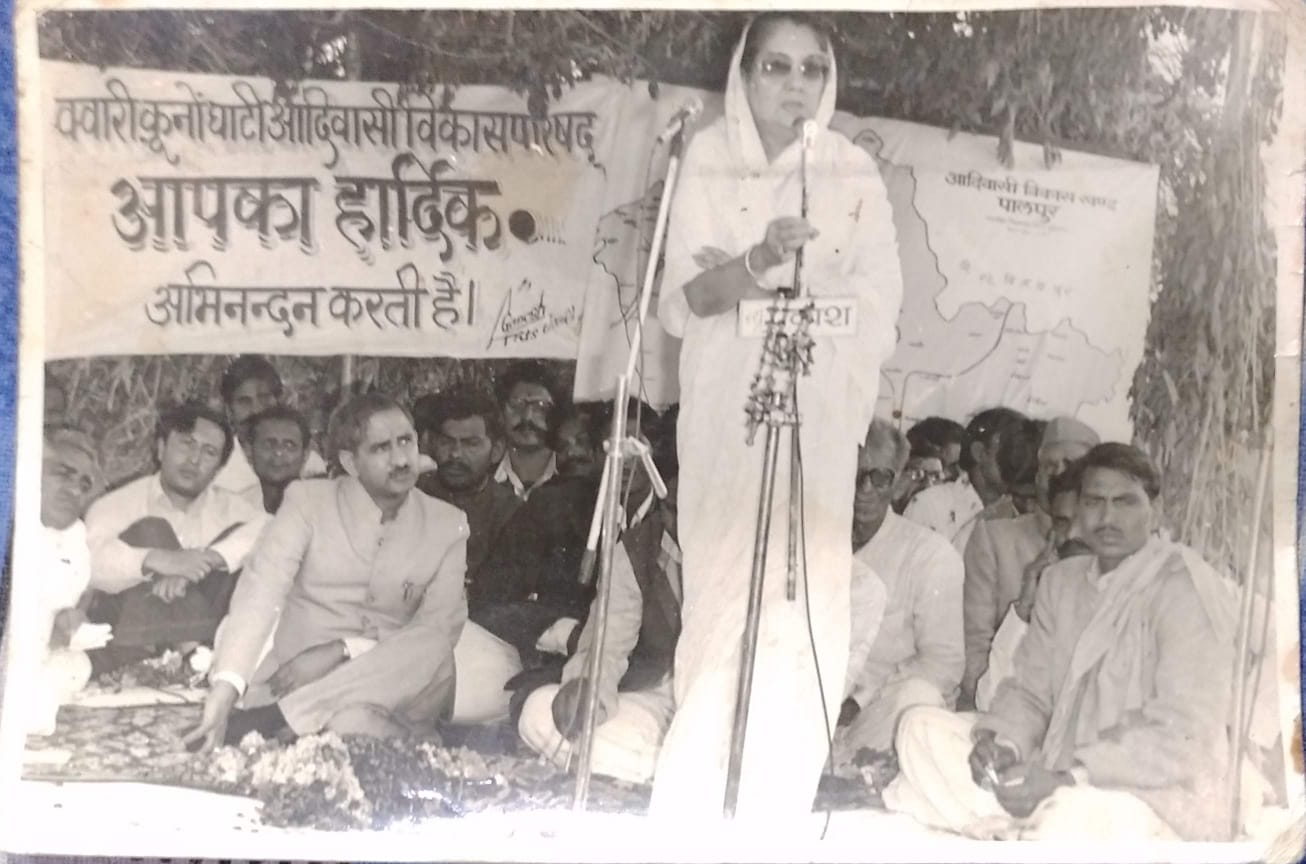
Shri Baboolal Mewra (Right Corner) with Rajmaata Vijaya Raje Scindia Ji (Standing with Mic)

Two Term Member of the Legislative Assembly (India) Mewraji entered politics as member of Bharatiya Jana Sangh in year 1967 after getting inspired from the activism of Rajmata Vijaya Raje Scindia and Kushabhau Thakre during public rallies and meetings, where he accompanied them. He remains an active Swayamsevak and Pracharak of Rashtriya Swayamsevak Sangh (RSS). He pledged to wear Saffron clothes throughout his life. He worked for Bharatiya Jana Sangh as Mandal President of Vijaypur, Madhya Pradesh for 10 years (from 1967 to 1977). He is known and credited for laying the foundation stones of party in the region by travelling village to village on foot and promoting the ideology of Bharatiya Jana Sangh. As Vijaypur being a dense forest area in Chambal (region), he bravely faced many infamous dacoits during his Padayatra's in the region for decades and also helped people from the terror of dacoits.

For conducting the protest along with Jayaprakash Narayan against imposition of the emergency during the tenure of then Prime Minister Indira Gandhi in India, he was sent to prison of Gwalior from 12 July 1975 to 3 February 1977 under Maintenance of Internal Security Act (MISA).

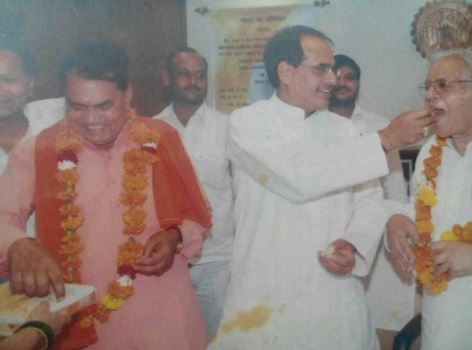
Shri Baboolal Mewra with CM Shivraj Singh Chauhan after being Nominated as State Minister in year 2010.

After his release from prison of Gwalior in 1977, he came into mainstream politics and became the voice of farmers, poor, backward and downtrodden people in the region. He was elected two-times as Janapada President in 1978 and 1980 respectively. Identifying his large public base and notable social work, Rajmata Vijaya Raje Scindia supported him and he was given ticket from BJP to contest in 1985 Madhya Pradesh Legislative Assembly election. He was then elected as MLA from Vijaypur for the first time where he defeated Indian National Congress candidate Jagmohan Singh. He was re-elected during 1998 Madhya Pradesh Legislative Assembly election as BJP candidate by defeating Ramnivas Rawat of Congress. He also served as vice-president of Madhya Pradesh Rajya Van Vikas Nigam Limited and held Minister of State Rank from year 2010 to 2013 in the Government of Madhya Pradesh with Shivraj Singh Chouhan as Chief minister.

In 2018, after BJP denied him ticket thrice in 2003, 2008 and 2013 state elections, he contested in 2018 Madhya Pradesh Legislative Assembly election as Bahujan Samaj Party candidate. from Vijaypur and received 35,628 votes, which is highest recorded number of votes received by any BSP candidate in the region till date. In 2019 he joined Congress in the presence of Jyotiraditya Scindia for a brief tenure.

After the 2020 Madhya Pradesh political crisis, BJP leadership brought Mewraji back to his roots and old home. He returned to BJP on 26 November 2022. In 2023, BJP announced Mewraji as their official candidate from Vijaypur for 2023 Madhya Pradesh Legislative Assembly election after 20 years. He lost the 2023 Assembly election to his rival Congress' candidate Ramnivas Rawat due to alleged weak support of local party officials and mobilization of Adivasi votes to another independent candidate by former BJP MLA Sitaram Aadivashi who was later reprimanded by Shivraj Singh Chouhan during his visit to Sheopur post elections. Mewraji still took the responsibility for electoral results and remained committed as usual to serve the poor, backward, farmers and people in need from his region.

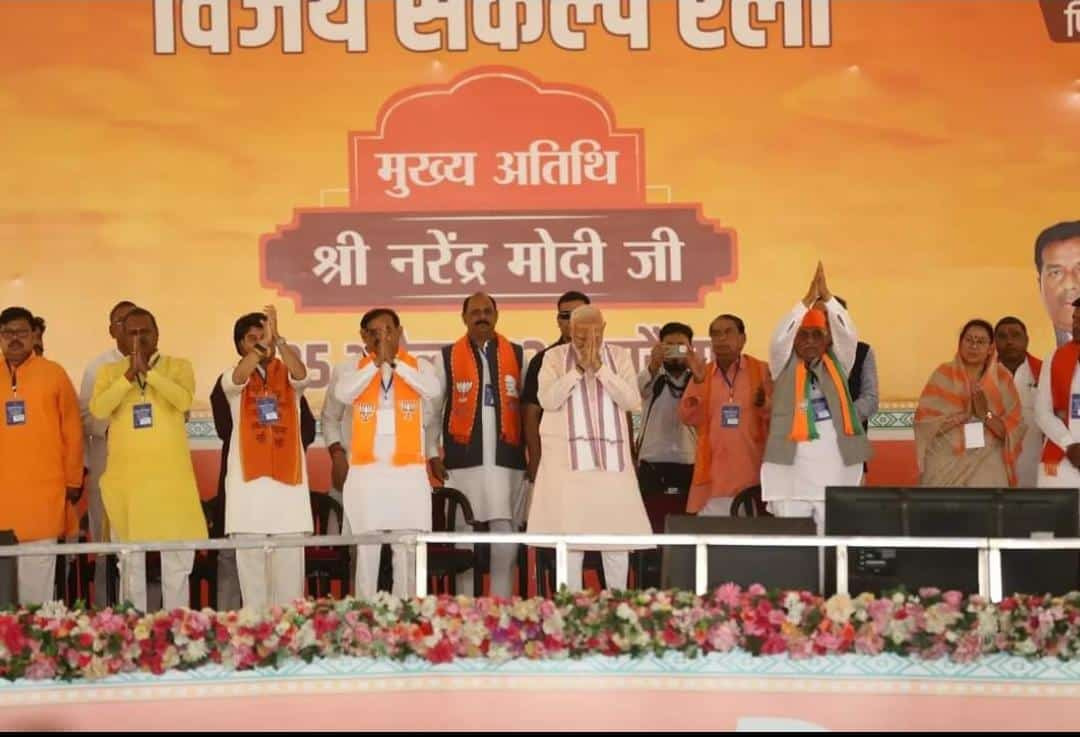
Shri Baboolal Mewra with Hon'ble PM Shri Narendra Modi and BJP top leadership during Vijay Sankalp Rally in Morena during 2024 Indian general election

In 2024 Indian general election, Mewraji played crucial role in mobilizing the rural votes in Chambal region and was involved in strengthening the party. He campaigned for the BJP Candidates namely Jyotiraditya Scindia from Guna Lok Sabha constituency and Shivmangal Singh Tomar from Morena Lok Sabha constituency. He was also part of Vijay Sankalp Rally held in Morena in the presence of Prime minister Narendra Modi.

== See also ==
- Madhya Pradesh Legislative Assembly
- 2023 Madhya Pradesh Legislative Assembly election
- 1998 Madhya Pradesh Legislative Assembly election
- 1985 Madhya Pradesh Legislative Assembly election
- 2024 Indian general election
