= Munshilal Khatik =

Indian politician

Member of the Madhya Pradesh Legislative Assembly
- In office 1977–1993
- Constituency: Dimani
- In office 1998–2003
- Constituency: Dimani

Personal details
- Born: 13 January 1957 (age 69) Morena District
- Citizenship: India
- Party: Bhartiya Janata Party
- Occupation: Politician
- Cabinet: ex Minister

Munshilal Khatik is an Indian politician and member of Legislative Assembly of Madhya Pradesh. He represents the Dimani- Morena (Vidhan Sabha constituency) constituency of Madhya Pradesh and is a member of the Bharatiya Janata Party political party.

== Early life and education ==
Munshilal born in Murena district of Madhya Pradesh. Currently chairman of Animal husbandry and poultry development corporation, Madhya Pradesh.

== Political career ==
Munshilal Khatik is an Indian politician and member of Legislative Assembly of Madhya Pradesh. He represents the Morena constituency of Madhya Pradesh and is a member of the Bharatiya Janata Party political party. He has been five times MLA in Morena constituency and currently chairman of animal husbandry and poultry development corporation, Madhya Pradesh.
