= Dimani Assembly constituency =

Constituency of the Madhya Pradesh legislative assembly in India

Coordinates: 26.61°N 78.15°E

Dimani
- Constituency No. 7 for the Madhya Pradesh Legislative Assembly

Constituency details
- Country: India
- Region: Central India
- State: Madhya Pradesh
- District: Morena
- Lok Sabha constituency: Morena
- Established: 1977
- Reservation: None

Member of Legislative Assembly
- 16th Madhya Pradesh Legislative Assembly
- Incumbent Narendra Singh Tomar
- Party: Bharatiya Janata Party
- Elected year: 2023
- Preceded by: Ravindra Tomar Bhidosa

Dimani Assembly constituency (formerly, Dimni) is one of the 230 Vidhan Sabha (Legislative Assembly) constituencies of Madhya Pradesh state in central India. This constituency was reserved for the candidates belonging to the Scheduled castes till 2008.

Dimani (constituency number 7) is one of the six Vidhan Sabha constituencies located in Morena district. This constituency covers parts of Ambah and Morena tehsils.

Dimani is part of Morena Lok Sabha constituency.

== Members of the Legislative Assembly ==
Year	Member	Party
1962	Summer Singh Amariya	Independent
1967	Summer Singh Amariya	Independent
1972	Chhaviram Argal	Bharatiya Jana Sangh
1977	Munshilal Khatik	Janata Party
1980	Munshilal Khatik	Bharatiya Janata Party
1985	Munshilal Khatik	Bharatiya Janata Party
1990	Munshilal Khatik	Bharatiya Janata Party
1993	Ramesh Kori	Indian National Congress
1998	Munshilal Khatik	Bharatiya Janata Party
2003	Sandhya Ray	Bharatiya Janata Party
2008	Shivmangal Singh Tomar	Bharatiya Janata Party
2013	Balveer Singh Dandotiya	Bahujan Samaj Party
2018	Girraj Dandotiya	Indian National Congress
2020^	Ravindra Tomar Bhidosa	Indian National Congress
2023	Narendra Singh Tomar	Bharatiya Janata Party

^ bypolls

== Election results ==
=== 2023 ===
2023 Madhya Pradesh Legislative Assembly election: Dimani
Party	Candidate	Votes	%	±%
BJP	Narendra Singh Tomar	79,137	48.94	+14.2
BSP	Pandit Balveer Singh Dandotiya	54,676	33.81	+26.00
INC	Ravindra Singh Tomar Bhidosa	24,006	14.84	−39.90
NOTA	None of the above	778	0.48	−0.16
Majority		24,461	15.13	−4.87
Turnout		161,714	69.76	+8.66
BJP gain from INC		Swing		

=== 2020 bypolls ===
2020 Madhya Pradesh Legislative Assembly by-elections: Morena
Party	Candidate	Votes	%	±%
INC	Ravindra Singh Tomar Bhidosa	72,445	54.74	+5.51
BJP	Girraj Dandotiya	45978	34.74	−1.42
BSP	Rajendra Singh Kansana	10337	7.81	−2.42
NOTA	None of the above	846	0.64	+0.33
Majority		26467	20.0	−6.93
Turnout		132334	61.1	−9.05
INC hold		Swing		

=== 2018 ===
2018 Madhya Pradesh Legislative Assembly election: Dimani
Party	Candidate	Votes	%	±%
INC	Girraj Dandotiya	69,597	49.23	
BJP	Shiv Mangal Singh Tomar	51,120	36.16	
BSP	Chhattar Singh Tomar	14,456	10.23	
NOTA	None of the above	436	0.31	
Majority		18,477	13.07	
Turnout		141,369	70.15	
INC gain from BSP		Swing		

== See also ==
- Morena district
