= Baboolall =

Baboolall is a surname. Notable people with the surname include:

- Chetan Baboolall (fl. from 2024), Mauritian politician
- Denneshsing Baboolall (born 1984), Mauritian badminton player

== See also ==
- Baboolal Mewra
- Linda Baboolal
