= Bansi Lal Jatav =

Indian politician from Madhya Pradesh

Bansilal Jatav
- बंसीलाल जाटव

Member of the Madhya Pradesh Legislative Assembly
- In office 1993–2008
- Preceded by: Kishora
- Succeeded by: Kamlesh Jatav
- Constituency: Ambah

Personal details
- Party: Bharatiya Janata Party
- Other political affiliations: Samajwadi Party (2020)

Bansilal Jatav is an Indian politician from Madhya Pradesh. He served as a member of the Madhya Pradesh Legislative Assembly from the Ambah constituency in Morena district. He was elected multiple times on the ticket of the Bharatiya Janata Party and was considered an influential leader among Scheduled Castes voters in the region.

== Political career ==
Bansilal Jatav was elected to the Madhya Pradesh Legislative Assembly from Ambah in the 1998 and 2003 assembly elections as a candidate of the Bharatiya Janata Party. He represented the constituency for two consecutive terms until 2008.

In 2020, ahead of the Madhya Pradesh by-elections, Jatav was denied a ticket by the BJP. Subsequently, he joined the Samajwadi Party and was announced as its candidate from the Ambah constituency.

However, shortly afterwards, he rejoined the BJP and publicly supported BJP candidate Kamlesh Jatav in the by-election.
