= Bijeypur =

Vijaypur विजयपुर
- Town
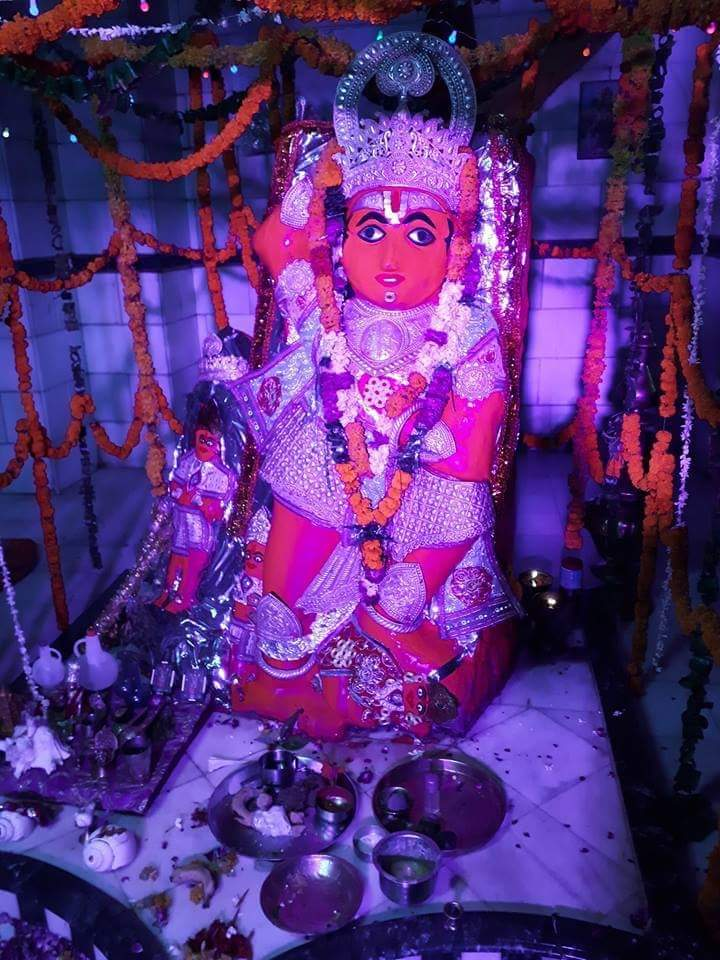
- Chhim Chhima Mandir

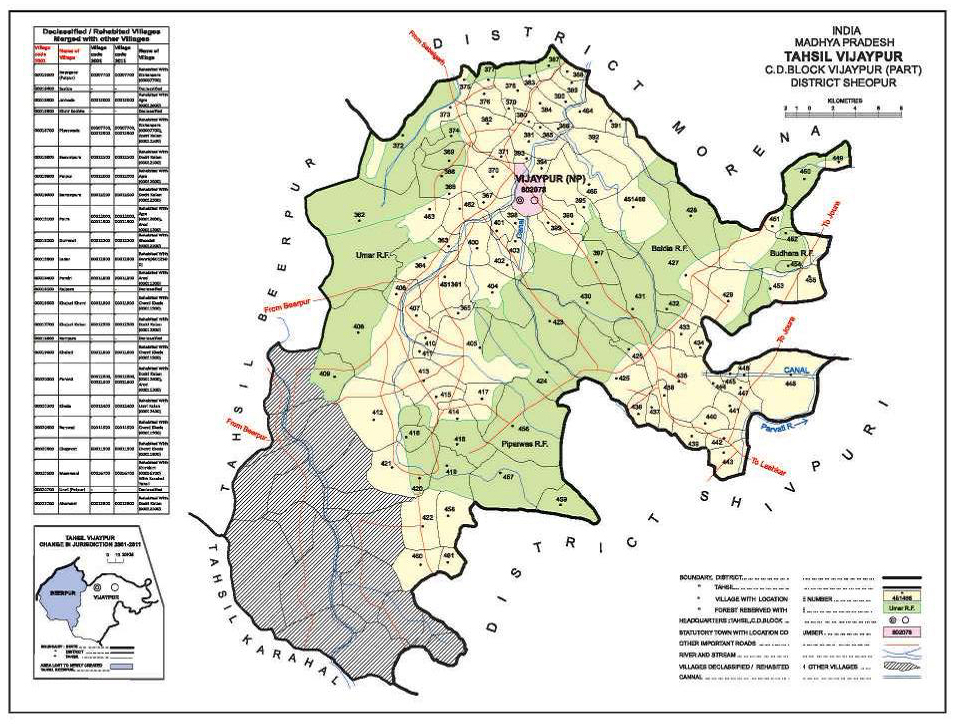
- Map Of Vijaypur Block

- Location within Madhya Pradesh Location within India
- Coordinates: 26°3′20″N 77°22′11″E
- Country: India
- State: Madhya Pradesh
- Division: Chambal
- District: Sheopur
- Tehsil: Vijaypur
- Named for: Bijey Singh (Ruler Of Karauli State)

Government
  - Type: Government of Madhya Pradesh
  - Body: Municipality
  - Assembly Constituency: Vijaypur, Madhya Pradesh Assembly constituency
  - MLA: Ramnivas Rawat (INC)
- Elevation: 219 m (719 ft)

Population (2011)
  - Total: 14,555

Languages
  - Official: Hindi
- Time zone: UTC+5:30 (IST)
- PIN: 476332
- Telephone code: 07528
- Vehicle registration: MP31

Vijaypur also known as Bijeypur is a town located in district Sheopur, Madhya Pradesh, India. This town is a part of the Vijaypur (Vidhan Sabha) constituency and Morena (Lok Sabha) constituency. It is located on the bank of the Kwari River. The town is one of the gateways to the Kuno National Park, the site selected as a second home to the Asiatic Lion and also for cheetah reintroduction in India.

== Transport and Connectivity ==
=== Road ===
Vijaypur is connected to nearby cities. Regular Bus Services are available to Gwalior, Morena, Sheopur, Shivpuri, Jaipur.

=== Railway ===
The main railway station near the town is Gwalior Junction (GWL) about 130 km, which is well-connected to all parts of the country.

=== Airway ===
The nearest airport is Gwalior Airport (Rajmata Vijaya Raje Scindia Airport), about 130 km from Vijaypur. Daily flights to Delhi, Kolkata, Hyderabad, Banglore, and Jammu are available from Gwalior Airport.

== Economy ==
Vijaypur is a major market and agricultural producer, selling crops and food to nearby villages. The most common crops in Mandi are mustard seed, gram, wheat, and pearl millet. There are numerous Mustard Oil Mills in the town.

== Healthcare ==
Vijaypur has a government hospital with two doctors and a 30-bed facility. It also has a dedicated ambulance service named Janani Express, used to bring pregnant women from rural areas to the facility for delivery.

There are a few private doctors in the entire town.

Medical pharmacy stores are found all over the town.

== Tourist attractions ==
=== Chhim Chhima Mandir ===
Chhim Chhima Mandir is a Hindu Temple dedicated to Lord Hanuman. It is about 9 km from Bijeypur, on Morena-Shivpuri (M.S.) Road. There is an ancient (about 400years old) idol of Lord Hanuman. According to local traditions, the temple is blessed with a miraculous spring whose water does not dry up even in the warmest of summers. It is said that when Aurangzeb's army was climbing this temple, all the soldiers went blind and had to return. In the Hindi month of Bhado (August–September) a one-day fair is held which attracts Lakhs of devotees from nearby districts. Currently, the temple is under renovation and a major plantation drive is taking place all around this.

=== Kuno National Park ===
Kuno National Park was established as Kuno Wildlife Sanctuary in 1981 with an initial area of about 344.68 km2 (133.08 sq mi). One of the three gates to access this sanctuary, Pipalbawdi gate, is located near Agra, a village in Vijaypur. Most of the inhabitants were Saharia tribal people. An area of 924 km^{2} (357 sq mi) surrounding the wildlife sanctuary was added as a buffer zone to human settlements.

=== Siddh Baba Hill ===
This Divine hill is about 2 km from Bijeypur, on Morena-Shivpuri (M.S.) Road.. Every year in January and February, a trade fair is held. The initial part of the fair is dedicated to an animal fair in which people from nearby states come to selling and purchase animals like bulls, cows, camels etc. In the fair, cultural activities like kavi sammelan, folk songs, drama also take place.

=== Vijaypur Fort ===
At the bank of kwari river, stands a fort known as Vijaypur Fort. The fort was built by Vijay Singh, the King of Karauli and completed in the 14-15th century. Till this time Karauli used to border the state here. It is a protected monument of the state. The town was later named Vijaypur after Raja Vijay Singh.

== Issues ==
- Vijaypur was transferred against the wishes of its people to the newly created district of Sheopur in 1998 from Morena district. People resent this because it is more well connected and integrated with Morena than Sheopur. Even after 23 years of being in Sheopur, transportation with Sheopur is very poor.
- Vijaypur is again being neglected in the proposed upgrade of Gwalior light railway from narrow gauge to broad gauge. It is an upgrade that is high demand.
- There is no political initiative yet to make it a tourist destination by developing it as an attractive gateway to the nearby Kuno Wildlife Sanctuary.

== See also ==
- Sheopur
- Kuno National Park
- Kwari River
