= Rustam Singh =

Rustam Singh may refer to:

- Rustam Singh (poet), Indian poet, philosopher, translator and editor
- Rustam Singh (politician), Indian politician
