= Raghuraj Singh Kansana =

Indian politician

Member of Madhya Pradesh Legislative Assembly
- In office 2018–2020
- Preceded by: Rustam Singh
- Succeeded by: Rakesh Mavai
- Constituency: Morena

Personal details
- Born: Raghuraj Singh Kansana
- Party: Bharatiya Janata Party
- Other political affiliations: Indian National Congress (before 2020)

Raghuraj Singh Kansana is an Indian politician. He was elected to the Madhya Pradesh Legislative Assembly from Morena. He was an elected member of the Madhya Pradesh Legislative Assembly as a member of the Indian National Congress. During 2020 Madhya Pradesh political crisis, he supported senior Congress leader Jyotiraditya Scindia and was one of the 22 MLAs who resigned and later joined Bharatiya Janata Party.
