= Ramnivas Rawat =

Indian politician (born 1960)

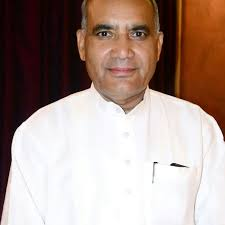

Minister of Forest And Environment Government of Madhya Pradesh
- In office 8 July 2024 – 5 December 2024
- Chief Minister: Mohan Yadav

Member of the Madhya Pradesh Legislative Assembly
- In office 2023–2024
- Preceded by: Sitaram Aadivashi
- Succeeded by: Mukesh Malhotra
- Constituency: Vijaypur

Member of the Madhya Pradesh Legislative Assembly
- In office 2003–2018
- Preceded by: Baboolal Mewra
- Constituency: Vijaypur
- In office 1990–1998
- Preceded by: Baboolal Mewra
- Succeeded by: Baboolal Mewra

Personal details
- Born: 21 January 1960 (age 66) Sunwai, Madhya Pradesh, India
- Party: Bharatiya Janata Party (2024–present)
- Other political affiliations: Indian National Congress (1986–2024)
- Spouse: Uma Rawat
- Education: LLB
- Alma mater: Jiwaji University, Gwalior
- Profession: Politician
- As of 23 July, 2018 Source: ["Biography" (PDF). Vidhan Sabha, Madhya Pradesh Legislative Assembly.]

Ramnivas Rawat (born 21 January 1960) is an Indian politician serving as Madhya Pradesh Working President of the Indian National Congress . He started his political career in Indian Youth Congress and had been the five-time legislator from Vijaypur constituency in Madhya Pradesh Vijaypur and cabinet minister in the Government of Madhya Pradesh in Digvijaya Singh cabinet. He unsuccessfully contested for Indian parliament in 2019 against BJP leader Narendra Singh Tomar.

== Personal life ==
Rawat was born on 21 January 1960 to Late Ganesh Prasad Rawat and Bhanti bai in Sunvai Tehsil in Vijaypur in Madhya Pradesh. He graduated with a Bachelor of Science degree and later earned a Masters with Gold Medal in History and LLB. Rawat is married to Uma Rawat, with whom he has two sons and two daughters.

== Political career ==
Five Term MLA Rawat entered politics through Indian Youth Congress in 1986. He was first elected as MLA from Vijaypur in 1990 and then in 1993. Rawat was inducted as Cabinet Minister in 1993 in Digvijay Singh cabinet. Subsequently, he won his elections from Vijaypur constituency in 2003, 2008 and 2013. In 2018 Assembly election, he lost to his nearest rival by 2890 votes from Vijaypur constituency. In 2019 Loksabha election, he contested against Narendra Singh Tomar and lost by 1,13,341 votes from Morena Lok Sabha.

Rawat joined the BJP on 30 April 2024 in the presence of Chief Minister Mohan Yadav. He took oath as minister in Madhya Pradesh cabinet on 8 July 2024.

== See also ==
- Madhya Pradesh Legislative Assembly
- 2013 Madhya Pradesh Legislative Assembly election
- 2008 Madhya Pradesh Legislative Assembly election
