= Raghunath (politician) =

Indian politician

Member of the Madhya Pradesh Legislative Assembly for Sheopur Vidhan Sabha
- Incumbent
- Assumed office 1957

Raghunath was an Indian politician from the state of the Madhya Pradesh. He represented Sheopur Vidhan Sabha constituency in Madhya Pradesh Legislative Assembly from Hindu Mahasabhba by winning General election of 1957.
