= Ambah Assembly constituency =

Constituency of the Madhya Pradesh legislative assembly in India

Coordinates: 26.70°N 78.23°E

Ambah
- Constituency No. 8 for the Madhya Pradesh Legislative Assembly

Constituency details
- Country: India
- Region: Central India
- State: Madhya Pradesh
- District: Morena
- Lok Sabha constituency: Morena
- Established: 1951
- Reservation: SC

Member of Legislative Assembly
- 16th Madhya Pradesh Legislative Assembly
- Incumbent Devendra Sakhwar
- Party: Indian National Congress
- Elected year: 2023
- Preceded by: Kamlesh Jatav

Ambah is one of the 230 Vidhan Sabha (Legislative Assembly) constituencies of Madhya Pradesh state in central India. This constituency is reserved for the candidates belonging to the Scheduled castes This constituency came into existence in 1951, as one of the 79 Vidhan Sabha constituencies of the erstwhile Madhya Bharat state.

Ambah (constituency number 8) is one of the six Vidhan Sabha constituencies located in Morena district. This constituency covers the entire Porsa tehsil, part of Ambah tehsil and Ambah municipality.

Ambah is part of Morena Lok Sabha constituency.

== Members of the Legislative Assembly ==
Madhya Bharat
Year	Member	Party
1951	Jamuna Prasad Singh Tomar	Indian National Congress
1951	Chandana	Indian National Congress

Madhya Pradesh Legislative Assembly
Year	Member	Party
1957	Ram Niwas Chitralal	Indian National Congress
1962	Jagdish Singh	Praja Socialist Party
1967	Ratiram	Independent politician
1972	Raja Ram Singh	Indian National Congress
1977	Chhokhelal Jatav	Janata Party
1980	Kammodilal Jatav	Indian National Congress (Indira)
1985	Ram Narayan Sakhavar	Indian National Congress
1990	Kishora Jatav	Janata Dal
1993	Bansi Lal Jatav	Bharatiya Janata Party
1998	Bansi Lal Jatav	Bharatiya Janata Party
2003	Bansi Lal Jatav	Bharatiya Janata Party
2008	Kamlesh Jatav	Bharatiya Janata Party
2013	Satya Prakash Sakhvar	Bahujan Samaj Party
2018	Kamlesh Jatav	Indian National Congress
2020^	Kamlesh Jatav	Bharatiya Janata Party
2023	Devendra Sakhwar	Indian National Congress

^ bypoll

== Election results ==
=== 2023 ===
2023 Madhya Pradesh Legislative Assembly election: Ambah
Party	Candidate	Votes	%	±%
INC	Devendra Sakhwar	80,373	55.38	+24.56
BJP	Kamlesh Jatav	57,746	39.79	−2.38
BSP	Rambaran Sakhawar	4,179	2.88	−3.68
NOTA	None of the above	884	0.61	−0.08
Majority		22,627	15.59	+4.24
Turnout		145,133	60.1	+6.34
INC gain from BJP		Swing		

=== 2020 bypolls ===
2020 Madhya Pradesh Legislative Assembly by-elections: Ambah
Party	Candidate	Votes	%	±%
BJP	Kamlesh Jatav	51,588	42.17	+18.38
INC	Satyaprakash Sakhawar	37696	30.82	+0.93
Independent	Abhinav Chhari	19246	15.73	
BSP	Bhanupratap Singh Sakhawar	8029	6.56	−11.20
Independent	Amar	1725	1.41	
NOTA	None of the above	839	0.69	−0.31
Majority		13892	11.35	+5.31
Turnout		122320	53.76	−5.25
BJP gain from INC		Swing		

=== 2018 ===
2018 Madhya Pradesh Legislative Assembly election: Ambah
Party	Candidate	Votes	%	±%
INC	Kamlesh Jatav	37,343	29.89	
Independent	Neha Kinnar	29,796	23.85	
BJP	Gabbar Sakhwar	29,715	23.79	
BSP	Satyaprakash Sakhawar [Advocate]	22,179	17.76	
NOTA	None of the above	1,255	1.0	
Majority		7,547	6.04	
Turnout		124,916	59.01	
INC gain from BSP		Swing		

== See also ==
- Ambah
