= Kunwar Yashwantsingh Kushwah =

Indian politician

MLA in the Madhya Pradesh Legislative Assembly
- In office 1957–1962
- Preceded by: Sowran Singh
- Succeeded by: Jabar Singh
- Constituency: Morena

Kunwar Yashwantsingh Kushwah was an Indian politician from the state of the Madhya Pradesh. He represented Morena Vidhan Sabha constituency in Madhya Pradesh Legislative Assembly by winning General election of 1957.
