= Morena Lok Sabha constituency =

Lok Sabha constituency in Madhya Pradesh

Coordinates: 26.5°N 78.0°E

Morena
- Lok Sabha constituency
- Interactive Map Outlining Morena Lok Sabha constituency

Constituency details
- Country: India
- Region: Central India
- State: Madhya Pradesh
- Assembly constituencies: Sheopur; Vijaypur; Sabalgarh; Joura; Sumawali; Morena; Dimani; Ambah
- Established: 1952
- Total electors: 20,06,730
- Reservation: None

Member of Parliament
- 18th Lok Sabha
- Incumbent Shivmangal Singh Tomar
- Party: BJP
- Alliance: NDA
- Elected year: 2024
- Preceded by: Narendra Singh Tomar; BJP

Morena Lok Sabha constituency is one of the 29 Lok Sabha constituencies in Madhya Pradesh state in central India. This constituency was reserved for the candidates belonging to the Scheduled castes in 1967 when it was also made a stand-alone constituency. This constituency presently covers the entire Sheopur and Morena districts.

== Assembly segments ==
Presently, Morena Lok Sabha constituency comprises the following eight Vidhan Sabha segments:

#	Name	District	Member	Party	2024 Lead
1	Sheopur	Sheopur	Babu Jandel	INC	BJP
2	Vijaypur	Sheopur	Mukesh Malhotra	INC	BJP
3	Sabalgarh	Morena	Sarla Vijendra Rawat	BJP	INC
4	Joura	Morena	Pankaj Upadhyay	INC	INC
5	Sumawali	Morena	Adal Singh Kansana	BJP	BJP
6	Morena	Morena	Dinesh Gurjar	INC	INC
7	Dimani	Morena	Narendra Singh Tomar	BJP	BJP
8	Ambah (SC)	Morena	Devendra Sakhwar	INC	BJP

== Members of Parliament ==
Year	Member	Party
1952	Radha Charan Sharma	Indian National Congress
1957	Radha Charan Sharma	Indian National Congress
1962	Suraj Prasad	Indian National Congress
1967	Atamdas	Independent
1971	Hukam Chand Kachwai	Bharatiya Jana Sangh
1977	Chhaviram Argal	Janata Party
1980	Babulal Solanki	Indian National Congress (I)
1984	Kammodilal Jatav	Indian National Congress
1989	Chhaviram Argal	Bharatiya Janata Party
1991	Barelal Jatav	Indian National Congress
1996	Ashok Argal	Bharatiya Janata Party
1998	Ashok Argal	Bharatiya Janata Party
1999	Ashok Argal	Bharatiya Janata Party
2004	Ashok Argal	Bharatiya Janata Party
2009	Narendra Singh Tomar	Bharatiya Janata Party
2014	Anoop Mishra	Bharatiya Janata Party
2019	Narendra Singh Tomar	Bharatiya Janata Party
2024	Shivmangal Singh Tomar	Bharatiya Janata Party

== Election results ==
BJP/BJS is the most successful political party in Morena Lok Sabha elections.
1. BJP/BJS (10 terms) (55.6%)
2. INC (6 terms) (33.3%)
3. JP (1 term) (5.56%)
4. Independent (1 term) (5.56%)

=== 2024 ===
2024 Indian general election: Morena
Party	Candidate	Votes	%	±%
BJP	Shivmangal Singh Tomar	515,477	42.11	▼5.52
INC	Satyapal Singh Sikarwar	4,62,947	38.99	▲1.33
BSP	Ramesh Garg	1,79,669	15.13	▲3.75
NOTA	None of the above	4,914	0.41	▲0.23
Majority		52,530	3.12	▼6.85
Turnout		11,87,331	58.97	▼2.99
BJP hold		Swing		

=== 2019 ===
2019 Indian general elections: Morena
Party	Candidate	Votes	%	±%
BJP	Narendra Singh Tomar	541,689	47.63	+3.67
INC	Ramnivas Rawat	4,28,348	37.66	+16.09
BSP	Kartar Singh Bhadana	1,29,380	11.38	−17.02
NOTA	None of the Above	2,098	0.18	−0.58
Majority		1,13,981	9.97	−5.59
Turnout		11,38,734	61.96	+11.78
BJP hold		Swing		

=== General Elections 2014 ===
2014 Indian general elections: Morena
Party	Candidate	Votes	%	±%
BJP	Anoop Mishra	3,75,567	43.96	+1.66
BSP	Brindawan Singh Sikarwar	2,42,586	28.40	+8.41
INC	Govind Singh	1,84,253	21.57	−6.52
AAP	Devendra Kumar Agrawal	13,806	1.62	N/A
Independent	Siyaram Singh Choudri	6,471	0.76	N/A
SP	Rajesh Kushwah	5,554	0.65	−3.87
Majority		1,32,981	15.56	
Turnout		8,54,279	50.18	
BJP hold		Swing		

=== General Elections 2009 ===
2009 Indian general elections: Morena
Party	Candidate	Votes	%	±%
BJP	Narendra Singh Tomar	3,00,648	42.30	
INC	Ramniwas Rawat	1,99,650	28.09	
BSP	Balveer Singh Dandotiya	1,42,073	19.99	
Majority		1,00,997	14.21	
Turnout		7,10,666	53.04	
BJP hold		Swing		

=== General Elections2004 ===
2004 Indian general elections: Morena
Party	Candidate	Votes	%	±%
BJP	Ashok Chhaviram Argal	261,337	49.32	
INC	Barelal Jatav	1,14,017	21.51	
BSP	Pritam Prasad Chaudhary	86,137	16.26	
SMSP	K. L. Ray (Kishanlal)	9,723	1.83	
SP	Shankar Lal Mourya	5,606	1.06	
Majority		1,47,320	27.81	
Turnout		5,29,000		
BJP hold		Swing		

=== 1999 ===
1999 Indian general elections: Morena
Party	Candidate	Votes	%	±%
BJP	Ashok Chhaviram Argal	261,337	53.60	
INC	Barelal Jatav	1,14,017	23.40	
BSP	Dr Pritam Prasad Chaudhary	86,137	17.70	
SMSP	K. L. Ray (Kishanlal)	9,723	2.00	
SP	Shankar Lal Mourya	5,606	1.06	
Majority		1,47,320	30.22	
Turnout		4,87,120	33.97	
BJP hold		Swing		

=== 1998 ===
1998 Indian general elections: Morena
Party	Candidate	Votes	%	±%
BJP	Ashok Chhabbiram Argal	277,499	43.44	
BSP	Dr. Pritam Prasad Chaudhary	2,09,378	32.77	
INC	Ramesh Babu	1,38,456	21.67	
Majority		68,121	10.67	
BJP hold		Swing		

=== 1996 ===
1996 Indian general elections: Morena
Party	Candidate	Votes	%	±%
BJP	Ashok Argal	172,675	42.58	
BSP	Dr. Pritam Prasad Chaudhary	1,34,696	33.21	
INC	Babu Lal Solanki	59,155	14.59	
AIIC(T)	Mukat Singh Sakhwar	12,324	3.04	
Majority		37,979	9.37	
BJP hold		Swing		

=== 1991 ===
1991 Indian general elections: Morena
Party	Candidate	Votes	%	±%
INC	Barelal Jatav	116,227	35.89	
BJP	Chhaviram Argal	99,482	30.72	
BSP	Pritam Prasad Chaudhary	67,406	20.82	
JD	Kishore Jatav	26,987	8.33	
Majority		16,745	5.17	
INC hold		Swing		

=== 1989 ===
1989 Indian general elections: Morena
Party	Candidate	Votes	%	±%
BJP	Chhaviram Argal	209,381	50.38	
INC	Kammodilal Jatav	1,21,520	29.24	
BSP	Dr. Pritam Parsad Chudhary	66,550	16.01	
Majority		87,861	21.14	
BJP hold		Swing		

=== 1984 ===
1984 Indian general elections: Morena
Party	Candidate	Votes	%	±%
INC	Kammodilal Jatav	157,683	47.92	
BJP	Munsilal Jatav	1,36,115	41.37	
JP	Kishor Jatav	13,427	4.08	
Majority		21,568	6.55	
INC hold		Swing		

== See also ==
- Morena district
- List of constituencies of the Lok Sabha
