= Rakesh Mavai =

Indian politician

Member of Madhya Pradesh Legislative Assembly
- Incumbent
- Assumed office 2020
- Constituency: Morena

Personal details
- Party: Indian National Congress
- Profession: Politician

Rakesh Mavai is an Indian politician from Madhya Pradesh. He is the Indian National Congress MLA of Morena state Assembly constituency.
