= Kamlesh Jatav =

Indian politician

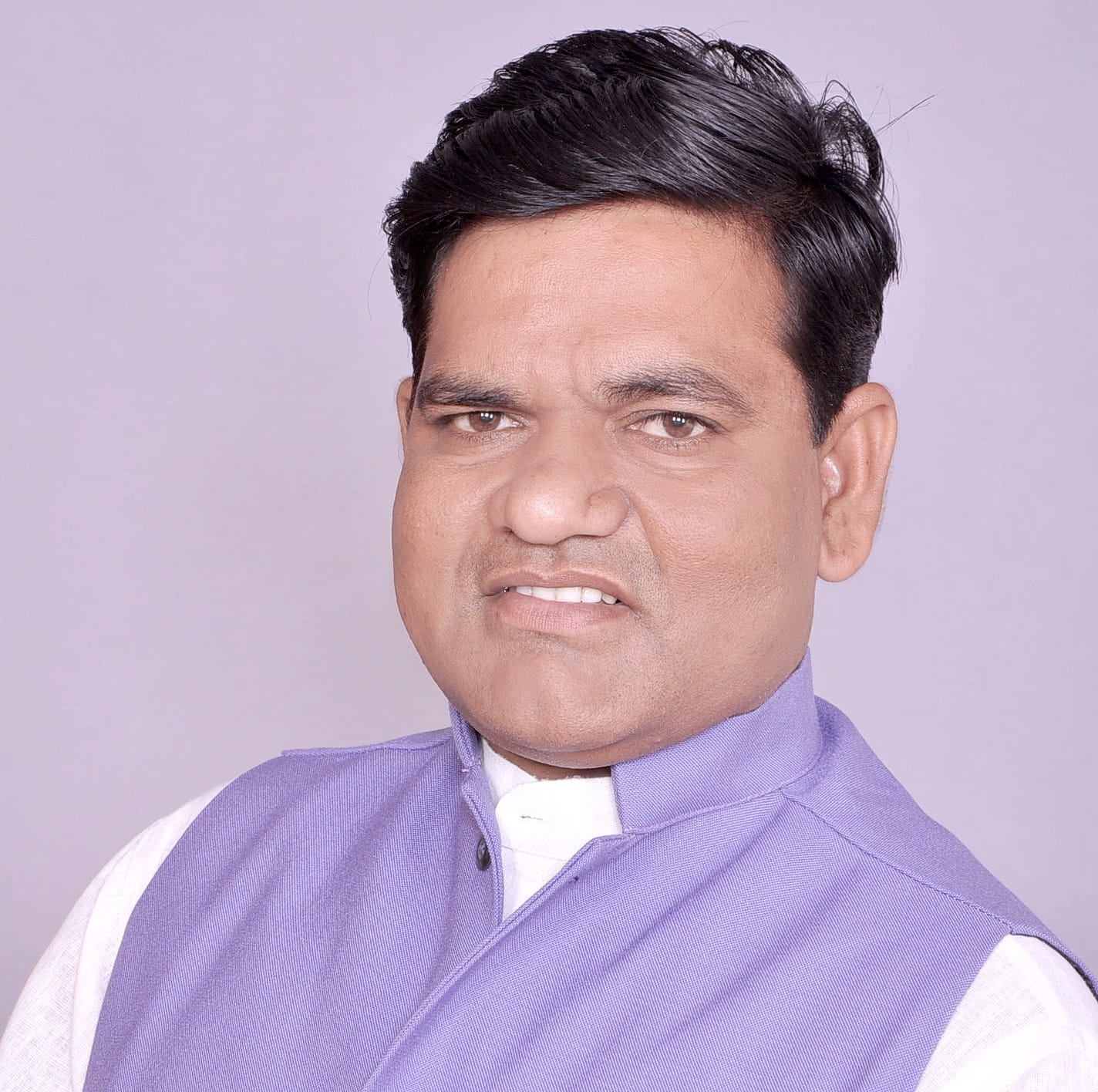

Member of Madhya Pradesh Legislative Assembly
- In office 2020–2023
- Preceded by: Self
- Succeeded by: Devendra Sakhwar
- In office 2018–2020
- Preceded by: Satya Prakash Sakhvar
- Succeeded by: Self
- In office 2008–2013
- Preceded by: Bansi Lal Jatav
- Succeeded by: Satya Prakash Sakhvar
- Constituency: Ambah

Personal details
- Born: Kamlesh Jatav
- Party: Bharatiya Janata Party
- Other political affiliations: Indian National Congress

Kamlesh Jatav is an Indian politician. He was elected to the Madhya Pradesh Legislative Assembly from Ambah. He was an elected member of the Madhya Pradesh Legislative Assembly as a member of the Indian National Congress. During 2020 Madhya Pradesh political crisis, he supported senior Congress leader Jyotiraditya Scindia and was one of the 22 MLAs who resigned and later joined Bharatiya Janata Party.

== Early life and education ==
Kamlesh Jatav was born on 8 May 1981 in Paychpura village in Morena district, Madhya Pradesh, to Chandan Singh Jatav. He completed his Bachelor of Arts degree from Government College, Ater, affiliated with Jiwaji University, Gwalior. He works as a government contractor.

== Political career ==
Jatav began his political career with the Indian National Congress. In 2013, he became the district general secretary of the Morena District Congress Committee. In 2014, he was appointed district president of the Jatav Samaj, and in 2015, he became district president of the Scheduled Caste Department of the Morena District Congress Committee.

=== 2008 Madhya Pradesh Legislative Assembly election ===
Jatav contested the 2008 Madhya Pradesh Legislative Assembly election from the Ambah Assembly constituency as a BJP candidate. He won the election by defeating Bahujan Samaj Party candidate Satya Prakash Sakhvar. Jatav received 29,156 votes, while his opponent received 25,229 votes.

=== 2018 Madhya Pradesh Legislative Assembly election ===
Ahead of the 2018 Madhya Pradesh Legislative Assembly election, Jatav joined the Indian National Congress and contested from Ambah. He defeated his nearest rival, independent candidate Neha Kinnar, by 7,547 votes. He received 37,343 votes against Neha's 29,796 votes and became a member of the 15th Madhya Pradesh Legislative Assembly.

During his tenure, he participated in the legislative proceedings of the Madhya Pradesh Legislative Assembly. According to PRS Legislative Research, he attended all recorded sittings during his first term and asked 43 questions.

=== 2020 Madhya Pradesh political crisis and BJP ===
In March 2020, Jatav resigned from the Madhya Pradesh Legislative Assembly along with other Congress legislators during the political crisis following the resignation of Jyotiraditya Scindia from the Congress. His resignation contributed to the fall of the Kamal Nath-led Congress government.

On 21 March 2020, Jatav joined the Bharatiya Janata Party along with other former Congress legislators.

=== 2020 by-election ===
Following his resignation, a by-election was held in the Ambah constituency in November 2020. Jatav contested as a BJP candidate and won the election, defeating Indian National Congress candidate Satyaprakash Sakhawar. He was sworn in as a member of the Madhya Pradesh Legislative Assembly for the second time on 28 December 2020.

=== 2023 Madhya Pradesh Legislative Assembly election ===
Jatav contested the 2023 Madhya Pradesh Legislative Assembly election from Ambah as a BJP candidate. He was defeated by Indian National Congress candidate Devendra Ramnarayan Sakhwar, who received 80,373 votes against Jatav's 57,746 votes.

== Personal life ==
Jatav is married to Aarti Gaur (Jatav). The couple have two daughters.

== Electoral history ==
Year	Election	Constituency	Party	Result	Votes	Opponent
2008	Madhya Pradesh Legislative Assembly	Ambah	Bharatiya Janata Party	Won	29,156	Satya Prakash (BSP)
2018	Madhya Pradesh Legislative Assembly	Ambah	Indian National Congress	Won	37,343	Neha Kinnar (Independent)
2020	By-election Madhya Pradesh Legislative Assembly	Ambah	Bharatiya Janata Party	Won	51,588	Satyaprakash Sakhawar (INC)
2023	Madhya Pradesh Legislative Assembly	Ambah	Bharatiya Janata Party	Lost	57,746	Devendra Ramnarayan Sakhwar (INC)
