= Kammodilal Jatav =

Indian politician

Member of Parliament, Lok Sabha
- In office 1984–1989
- Preceded by: Chhabiram Argal
- Succeeded by: Ashok Argal
- Constituency: Morena, Madhya Pradesh

Member of the Madhya Pradesh Legislative Assembly
- In office 1980–1984
- Preceded by: Chhokhelal
- Succeeded by: Ram Narayan Sakhavar
- Constituency: Ambah

Personal details
- Party: Indian National Congress
- Spouse: Doujabai

Kammodilal Jatav is an Indian politician. He was elected to the Lok Sabha, lower house of the Parliament of India from Morena, Madhya Pradesh as a member of the Indian National Congress.
