= Sheopur Assembly constituency =

Constituency of the Madhya Pradesh legislative assembly

Coordinates: 25.67°N 76.69°E

Sheopur
- Constituency No. 1 for the Madhya Pradesh Legislative Assembly

Constituency details
- Country: India
- Region: Central India
- State: Madhya Pradesh
- District: Sheopur
- Lok Sabha constituency: Morena
- Established: 1951
- Reservation: None

Member of Legislative Assembly
- 16th Madhya Pradesh Legislative Assembly
- Incumbent Babu Jandel
- Party: Indian National Congress
- Elected year: 2023
- Preceded by: Durgalal Vijay

Sheopur Assembly constituency is one of the 230 Vidhan Sabha (Legislative Assembly) constituencies of Madhya Pradesh state in central India. This constituency came into existence in 1951, as Sheopur Pohri, one of the 79 Vidhan Sabha constituencies of the erstwhile Madhya Bharat state.

Sheopur (constituency number 1) is one of the two Vidhan Sabha constituencies located in Sheopur district. This constituency covers the entire Sheopur sub-division.

Sheopur is part of Morena Lok Sabha constituency in Morena district.

== Members of the Legislative Assembly ==
Year	Member	Party
1957	Raghunath	Hindu Mahasabha
1962	Ram Swaroop	Hindu Mahasabha
1967	S Tiwari	Bharatiya Jana Sangh
1972	Lokendra Singh	Bharatiya Jana Sangh
1977	Gulab Singh	Janata Party
1980	Badri Prasad	Indian National Congress (I)
1985	Satyabhanu Chauhan	Indian Congress (Socialist)
1990	Gulab Singh	Bharatiya Janata Party
1993	Rama Shankar Bhardwaj	Bharatiya Janata Party
1998	Brijraj Singh	Independent
2003	Durgalal Vijay	Bharatiya Janata Party
2008	Brijraj Singh	Indian National Congress
2013	Durgalal Vijay	Bharatiya Janata Party
2018	Babu Jandel	Indian National Congress
2023	Babu Jandel	Indian National Congress

== Election results ==
=== 2023 ===
2023 Madhya Pradesh Legislative Assembly election: Sheopur
Party	Candidate	Votes	%	±%
INC	Babu Jandel	96,844	45.7	−9.47
BJP	Durgalal Vijay	85,714	40.45	+8.62
BSP	Bihari Singh Solanki	23,054	10.88	+2.8
NOTA	None of the above	1,801	0.85	−0.15
Majority		11,130	5.25	−18.09
Turnout		211,909	81.83	+2.31
INC hold		Swing		

=== 2018 ===
2018 Madhya Pradesh Legislative Assembly election: Sheopur
Party	Candidate	Votes	%	±%
INC	Babu Jandel	98,580	55.17	
BJP	Durgalal Vijay	56,870	31.83	
BSP	Tulsi Narayan Meena	14,444	8.08	
AAP	Adv Kuldeep Singh	2,142	1.2	
NOTA	None of the above	1,794	1.0	
Majority		41,710	23.34	
Turnout		178,690	79.52	
INC hold		Swing		

=== 2008 ===
2008 Madhya Pradesh Legislative Assembly election: Sheopur
Party	Candidate	Votes	%	±%
INC	Brijraj Singh	39,472	34.04	
BJP	Durgalal Vijay	30020	25.89	
BSP	Babulal	20818	17.95	
Independent	Moolchand Rawat	14943	12.89	N/A
Independent	Hiralal Mali	2032	1.75	
Majority				
Turnout		115972	72.58	
INC gain from BJP		Swing		

== See also ==
- Sheopur
