= Girraj Dandotiya =

Indian politician

Member of Madhya Pradesh Legislative Assembly
- In office 2018–2020
- Preceded by: Balveer Singh Dandotiya
- Succeeded by: Ravindra Singh Tomar Bhidosa
- Constituency: Dimani

Personal details
- Born: Morena
- Party: Bharatiya Janata Party
- Other political affiliations: Indian National Congress

Girraj Dandotiya is an Indian politician. He was elected to the Madhya Pradesh Legislative Assembly from Dimani. He was an elected member of the Madhya Pradesh Legislative Assembly as a member of the Indian National Congress. During 2020 Madhya Pradesh political crisis, he supported senior Congress leader Jyotiraditya Scindia and was one of the 22 MLAs who resigned and later joined Bharatiya Janata Party. Currently, He is the BJP-MP Executive Member and Chairman of Energy Development Corporation (Cabinet Minister Status, MP).
