= Anoop Mishra =

Indian politician

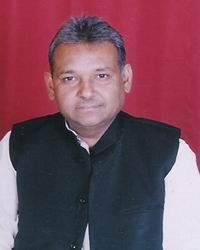

Member of Parliament, Lok Sabha
- In office 16 May 2014 – 23 May 2019
- Preceded by: Narendra Singh Tomar
- Succeeded by: Narendra Singh Tomar
- Constituency: Morena

Personal details
- Born: 13 May 1956 (age 69) Gwalior, Madhya Bharat, India
- Citizenship: Indian
- Party: Bharatiya Janata Party
- Spouse: Smt. Shobha Mishra (m. 1984)
- Children: 1 son, 1 daughter
- Parent(s): Shri Triyogi Nath Mishra and Smt. Urmila Devi
- As of 16 December, 2016

Anoop Mishra (born 16 May 1956; Hindi pronunciation: [ən̪uːp mɪʃɾaː]) is an Indian politician from the Bharatiya Janata Party (BJP). He was elected as a Member of parliament, Lok Sabha from Morena, Madhya Pradesh. He was elected as a Member of the Legislative Assembly of Madhya Pradesh State. He last represented the Gwalior East constituency during 2008–2013. Mishra is nephew of former Prime Minister of India Atal Bihari Vajpayee.

== Positions held ==
1990–1992 and 1998–2013	Member, Madhya Pradesh Legislative Assembly (Four Terms)

2003 – July 2010	Cabinet Minister, Govt. of Madhya Pradesh

Sep. 2012 – Dec. 2013	Cabinet Minister, Govt. of Madhya Pradesh

May 2014	Elected to 16th Lok Sabha

1 Sep. 2014 onwards	Member, Standing Committee on Personnel, Public Grievances, Law and Justice

15 Sep. 2014 onwards	Member, Committee on Members of Parliament Local Area Development Scheme (MPLADS)

Member, Consultative Committee, Ministry of Finance and Corporate Affairs

== Contribution during 16th Parliament ==
Question details of Anoop Mishra (questions asked)

Date	Title	Question type	Ministry	Training and Employment to NE of NER Youth	Unstarred	Development Of North Eastern Region
15-Dec-2015	Surplus Funds with PSUs	Unstarred	Heavy Industries and Public Enterprises
14-Dec-2015	Proposals for Setting up of Museums	Unstarred	Culture
11-Dec-2015	Defence Equipment	Starred	Defence
10-Dec-2015	National Rural Drinking Water Programme	Unstarred	Drinking Water and Sanitation
10-Dec-2015	Airports without Flight Operations	Unstarred	Civil Aviation
08-Dec-2015	Food Subsidy	Unstarred	Consumer Affairs, Food and Public Distribution
08-Dec-2015	Availability/Consumption of Fertilizers	Unstarred	Chemicals and Fertilizers
08-Dec-2015	Jan Aushadhi Stores	Starred	Chemicals and Fertilizers
08-Dec-2015	Price of Drugs	Unstarred	Chemicals and Fertilizers
07-Dec-2015	E-Ticketing for Monuments	Unstarred	Culture
04-Dec-2015	Registered Companies with RoC	Unstarred	Corporate Affairs
04-Dec-2015	Misleading and Surrogate Advertisements	Unstarred	Information and Broadcasting
03-Dec-2015	Potential of Aviation Services	Unstarred	Civil Aviation
02-Dec-2015	Radiation Norms	Unstarred	Communications and Information Technology
02-Dec-2015	Energy from Sea Water	Unstarred	Earth Sciences
02-Dec-2015	Cyber Attack	Unstarred	Communications and Information Technology
02-Dec-2015	BSNL and MTNL Telecom Services	Unstarred	Communications and Information Technology
02-Dec-2015	Nuclear Reactors/Plants	Unstarred	Prime Minister
01-Dec-2015	Agricultural Profession	Unstarred	Agriculture and Farmers Welfare
01-Dec-2015	Drought Assistance	Unstarred	Agriculture and Farmers Welfare
01-Dec-2015	Procurement of Pulses	Unstarred	Agriculture and Farmers Welfare
30-Nov-2015	Setting up of NIMZs	Unstarred	Commerce and Industry
30-Nov-2015	Conservation of Monuments	Unstarred	Culture
30-Nov-2015	Development of Industries	Unstarred	Commerce and Industry
13-Aug-2015	Jal Kranti Abhiyan	Unstarred	Water Resources, River Development and Ganga Rejuvenation
12-Aug-2015	Poor Telecom Services in Rural Areas	Unstarred	Communications and Information Technology
11-Aug-2015	Promotion of Fishery Sector	Unstarred	Agriculture
11-Aug-2015	Criminal Justice System	Unstarred	Home Affairs
10-Aug-2015	Metre Gauge Rail Line	Unstarred	Railways
10-Aug-2015	Irregularities in Confirmation of Railway Tickets	Unstarred	Railways
07-Aug-2015	Mature Slot on Satellite Television	Unstarred	Information and Broadcasting
06-Aug-2015	Wage-material Ratio under MGNREGS	Unstarred	Rural Development
04-Aug-2015	Loss of Foodgrains	Unstarred	Consumer Affairs, Food and Public Distribution
04-Aug-2015	Eco-sensitive Zone	Unstarred	Environment, Forests and Climate Change
03-Aug-2015	Electrification of Rail Line	Unstarred	Railways
03-Aug-2015	Showcase Indian Tourism Potential Abroad	Unstarred	Tourism
31-Jul-2015	Seventh Pay Commission	Unstarred	Finance
31-Jul-2015	Ban on TV Programmes	Unstarred	Information And Broadcasting
30-Jul-2015	Review of 73rd and 74th (Amendments) Act	Unstarred	Panchayati Raj
29-Jul-2015	Compensation for Deceased Labour	Unstarred	Overseas Indian Affairs
29-Jul-2015	Jan Shikshan Sansthan	Unstarred	Human Resource Development
29-Jul-2015	Radiation from Mobile Towers and Handsets	Unstarred	Communications And Information Technology
28-Jul-2015	Development of Traditional Games	Unstarred	Youth Affairs And Sports
27-Jul-2015	Planes owned by Airlines	Unstarred	Civil Aviation
27-Jul-2015	Air Connectivity	Unstarred	Civil Aviation
27-Jul-2015	Airport Projects	Unstarred	Civil Aviation
27-Jul-2015	Completion of Pending Projects	Unstarred	Railways
23-Jul-2015	Rural Schemes	Unstarred	Rural Development
23-Jul-2015	Rural Housing Schemes	Unstarred	Rural Development
23-Jul-2015	Demand and Supply of Drinking Water	Unstarred	Drinking Water and Sanitation
22-Jul-2015	Housing for All 2022	Unstarred	Housing and Urban Poverty Alleviation
22-Jul-2015	Minority Concentrated Districts	Unstarred	Minority Affairs
07-May-2015	Additional Assistance for Power Generation	Unstarred	Power
07-May-2015	Promotion/Development of Handicraft Sector	Starred	Textiles
07-May-2015	Funds for Land Reform	Unstarred	Rural Development
06-May-2015	Facilities and Amenities in Government Schools	Unstarred	Human Resource Development
06-May-2015	Programme for Young Scientists and Research Scholars	Unstarred	Science and Technology
05-May-2015	Cyber Crimes	Unstarred	Home Affairs
30-Apr-2015	Pension Schemes	Unstarred	Rural Development
29-Apr-2015	Implementation of RTE Act	Starred	Human Resource Development
29-Apr-2015	Training/Employment to Women under Skill Development	Unstarred	Skill Development, Entrepreneurship, Youth Affairs and Sports
29-Apr-2015	Industrial Training Institutes	Unstarred	Skill Development, Entrepreneurship, Youth Affairs and Sports
28-Apr-2015	Consumption of Fertilizers	Unstarred	Agriculture
27-Apr-2015	Monitoring of Gas Pricing	Starred	Petroleum and Natural Gas
24-Apr-2015	Rajiv Gandhi Equity Savings Scheme	Unstarred	Finance
24-Apr-2015	Overcharging by Hospitals	Unstarred	Health and Family Welfare
24-Apr-2015	AYUSH Hospitals and Dispensaries	Unstarred	AYUSH
24-Apr-2015	Payment to Safai Karamcharis in CGHS	Unstarred	Health and Family Welfare
23-Apr-2015	Progress Under IAY	Unstarred	Rural Development
23-Apr-2015	Funds to Madhya Pradesh	Unstarred	Road Transport and Highways
23-Apr-2015	Green Corridor Project	Unstarred	New and Renewable Energy
22-Apr-2015	Nai Roshni Scheme	Unstarred	Minority Affairs
22-Apr-2015	Renovation of Bungalows	Unstarred	Housing and Urban Poverty Alleviation
21-Apr-2015	Cultivation of Food Crops	Unstarred	Agriculture
20-Apr-2015	Passenger Fare in Short Distance Trains	Unstarred	Railways
20-Apr-2015	Computerized Railway Ticketing	Unstarred	Railways
18-Mar-2015	Maintenance of Flats	Unstarred	Urban Development
17-Mar-2015	National Green Corps	Unstarred	Environment, Forests and Climate Change
11-Dec-2014	Cremation on River Banks	Unstarred	Water Resources, River Development and Ganga Rejuvenation
09-Dec-2014	Environmental Clearance for Projects	Unstarred	Environment, Forests and Climate Change
04-Dec-2014	Interlinking of Rivers	Unstarred	Water Resources, River Development and Ganga Rejuvenation
04-Dec-2014	Sun Control Film for Vehicles	Unstarred	Road Transport and Highways
03-Dec-2014	Telephone Exchange	Unstarred	Communications and Information Technology
03-Dec-2014	Metro Projects	Unstarred	Housing and Urban Poverty Alleviation
03-Dec-2014	RWAs	Unstarred	Prime Minister
03-Dec-2014	Illegal Occupation of Government Bungalows	Unstarred	Housing and Urban Poverty Alleviation
02-Dec-2014	Medical Test of Women Boxers	Unstarred	Youth Affairs and Sports
27-Nov-2014	Road Over Bridges and Under Bridges	Unstarred	Coal
27-Nov-2014	Survey for Gauge Conversion	Unstarred	Railways
14-Aug-2014	Redevelopment of NHs	Unstarred	Road Transport and Highways
13-Aug-2014	Bird Sanctuaries	Unstarred	Environment, Forests and Climate Change
12-Aug-2014	Conservation of Mural Paintings	Unstarred	Culture
12-Aug-2014	Use of Black Film	Unstarred	Home Affairs
07-Aug-2014	Cleaning of Rivers	Unstarred	Water Resources, River Development and Ganga Rejuvenation
