= Vimla Verma =

Indian politician (1929–2019)

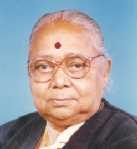

MP
- Constituency: Seoni

Personal details
- Born: 1 July 1929
- Died: 17 May 2019 (aged 89)
- Party: Indian National Congress
- Spouse: Unmarried
- Education: Allahabad University
- Profession: Politician, Social Worker, Agriculturist, Teacher, Educationist

Kumari Vimla Verma (1 July 1929 – 17 May 2019) was an Indian politician and social worker. She was a Member of Parliament, having been elected from the Seoni constituency in the state of Madhya Pradesh as an Indian National Congress candidate.

== Life and career ==
Vimla Verma was born in Nagpur, Maharashtra on 1 July 1929. She held an M.A and was educated at Allahabad University, Allahabad.

Verma was a founder-member of the Education Committee of Seoni, the Arts College of Seoni, and the Madhya Pradesh State Social Welfare Board.

From 1963 onwards, Verma served as a Member of the All India Congress Committee (A.I.C.C.). She was elected to the 10th Lok Sabha in 1991. In 1998, she was re-elected to 12th Lok Sabha.

Verma worked as an honorary lecturer for two years. She was also an agriculturist, teacher and educationist.

Verma enjoyed literature and politics. Vimla was the President of the Hindi Sahitya Samiti, Seoni for several years. Her favorite pastimes included listening to music and studying art. Her passion was to work for the welfare of the society and development of women and children.

Vimla Verma died on 17 May 2019, at the age of 89.

== Notable achievements in Indian politics ==
- Verma was imprisoned for demonstrating against ill treatment meted out to Smt. Indira Gandhi during Janata regime, 1977–79
- Appointed Observer for Lok Sabha elections in Rajasthan and assembly elections in Uttar Pradesh, Maharashtra and Tamil Nadu by A.I.C.C.
- Appointed Observer for assessing political situation in five constituencies of Lok Sabha by Late Shri Rajiv Gandhi
- Verma was conferred the Vidhan Kirti award by the Madhya Pradesh Legislative Assembly for being the most distinguished legislator and for significant contribution to the legislative business of the House.
- Verma was Chairman, Project implementing Committee, Central Social Welfare Board; General-Secretary, Bharat Yuvak Samaj, Madhya Pradesh; Vice-President, Bharatiya Gramin Mahila Sangh; and Member, Madhya Pradesh Sewa Dal Board;

== Positions held ==
- 1963-67 - District Convenor, Mahila Wing, Congress, Madhya Pradesh; President, District Congress Committee (D.C.C.), Madhya Pradesh
- 1963 onwards - Member, All India Congress Committee (A.I.C.C.)
- 1967-90 - Member, Madhya Pradesh Legislative Assembly
- 1967-68 - Member, Public Accounts Committee
- 1967-69 - General-Secretary, Pradesh Congress Committee (P.C.C.), Madhya Pradesh
- 1969-72 - Minister of State, Irrigation and Power, Madhya Pradesh
- 1972-75 - Minister of State for Health, Madhya Pradesh
- 1977-80 - General-Secretary, P.C.C., Madhya Pradesh (2nd term)
- 1979-80 - Member, Committee on Public Undertakings
- 1980-85 - Cabinet Minister, Public Work Department, Irrigation, Rural Development and Transport, Madhya Pradesh
- 1982-90 - Member, Business Advisory Committee
- 1987-88 - Member, General Purposes Committee
- 1987-89 - Member, Women and Children Welfare Committee
- 1988-89 - Cabinet Minister, Labour and Human Resource Development, Madhya Pradesh
- 1989-90 - Cabinet Minister, Food and Civil Supplies and Co-operation, Irrigation, Narmada Development and Public Health Engineering
- 1991 - Elected to 10th Lok Sabha
- 1991-95 - Chairperson, Committee on Communications; Member, Committee on the Welfare of Scheduled Castes and Scheduled Tribes
- 1995-96 - Union Minister of State in the Ministry of Human Resource Development (Department of Women and Child Development)
- 1998 - Re-elected to 12th Lok Sabha (2nd term)
- 1998-99 - Chairperson, Committee on Absence of Members from the sittings of the House; Member, Committee on Agriculture; Member, General Purposes Committee Member, Consultative Committee, Ministry of Environment and Forests
