= Vijaypur, Madhya Pradesh Assembly constituency =

Constituency of the Madhya Pradesh legislative assembly in India

Coordinates: 26.06°N 77.37°E

Vijaypur
- Constituency No. 2 for the Madhya Pradesh Legislative Assembly

Constituency details
- Country: India
- Region: Central India
- State: Madhya Pradesh
- District: Sheopur
- Lok Sabha constituency: Morena
- Established: 1951
- Reservation: None

Member of Legislative Assembly
- 16th Madhya Pradesh Legislative Assembly
- Incumbent Mukesh Malhotra
- Party: Indian National Congress
- Elected year: 2024
- Preceded by: Ramnivas Rawat

Vijaypur Assembly constituency is one of the 230 Vidhan Sabha (Legislative Assembly) constituencies of Madhya Pradesh state in central India. This constituency came into existence in 1951, as Vijaypur, one of the 79 Vidhan Sabha constituencies of the erstwhile Madhya Bharat state.

Vijaypur (constituency number 2) is one of the two Vidhan Sabha constituencies located in Sheopur district. This constituency covers the entire Vijaypur and Karahal sub-divisions of the district.

Vijaypur is part of Morena Lok Sabha constituency.

== Members of Legislative Assembly ==
Year	Member	Party
Madhya Bharat
1952	Balmukund	Indian National Congress
Madhya Pradesh
1962	Naval Kishore	Independent
1967	Jagmohan Singh	Independent
1972	Jagmohan Singh	Bharatiya Jana Sangh
1977	Ajit Kumar	Janata Party
1980	Jagmohan Singh	Indian National Congress (I)
1985	Baboolal Mewra	Bharatiya Janata Party
1990	Ramnivas Rawat	Indian National Congress
1993	Ramnivas Rawat	Indian National Congress
1998	Baboolal Mewra	Bharatiya Janata Party
2003	Ramnivas Rawat	Indian National Congress
2008	Ramnivas Rawat	Indian National Congress
2013	Ramnivas Rawat	Indian National Congress
2018	Sitaram Aadivashi	Bharatiya Janata Party
2023	Ramnivas Rawat	Indian National Congress
2024^	Mukesh Malhotra	Indian National Congress

^ by-poll

== Election results ==
=== 2024 bypoll ===
Madhya Pradesh Legislative Assembly by-election 2024: Vijaypur
Party	Candidate	Votes	%	±%
INC	Mukesh Malhotra	100,469	50.66	
BJP	Ramnivas Rawat	93,105	46.95	
NOTA	None of the Above	1,087	0.55	
Majority		7,364	3.71	
Turnout		1,98,318	77.76	
INC hold		Swing		

=== 2023 ===
2023 Madhya Pradesh Legislative Assembly election: Vijaypur
Party	Candidate	Votes	%	±%
INC	Ramniwas Rawat	69,646	33.63	−1.23
BJP	Baboo Lal Mewra	51,587	24.91	−11.59
Independent	Mukesh Malhotra	44,128	21.31	+19.91
BSP	Dhara Singh Kushwah	34,346	16.58	−3.95
NOTA	None of the above	1,895	0.92	−0.11
Majority		18,059	8.72	+7.08
Turnout		207,102	81.77	+3.23
INC gain from BJP		Swing		

=== 2018 ===
2018 Madhya Pradesh Legislative Assembly election: Vijaypur
Party	Candidate	Votes	%	±%
BJP	Seetaram Adivasi	63,331	36.5	
INC	Ramniwas Rawat	60,491	34.86	
BSP	Baboo Lal Mewra	35,628	20.53	
Independent	Pannalal Solanki	2,615	1.51	
Independent	Mukesh Malhotra	2,423	1.4	
NOTA	None of the above	1,793	1.03	
Majority		2,840	1.64	
Turnout		173,505	78.54	
BJP gain from INC		Swing		

=== 2013 ===
2013 Madhya Pradesh Legislative Assembly election: Vijaypur
Party	Candidate	Votes	%	±%
INC	Ramnivas Rawat	67,358	44.12	
BJP	Sitaram Adiwashi	65,209	42.72	
BSP	Satish Singh	7,192	4.71	
SP	Udaya Bhan Singh	4,376	2.87	
NOTA	None of the above	2,019	1.32	
Majority		84,805	1.40	
Turnout		152,653	80.18	
INC hold		Swing		
