= Neeta Pateriya =

Indian politician

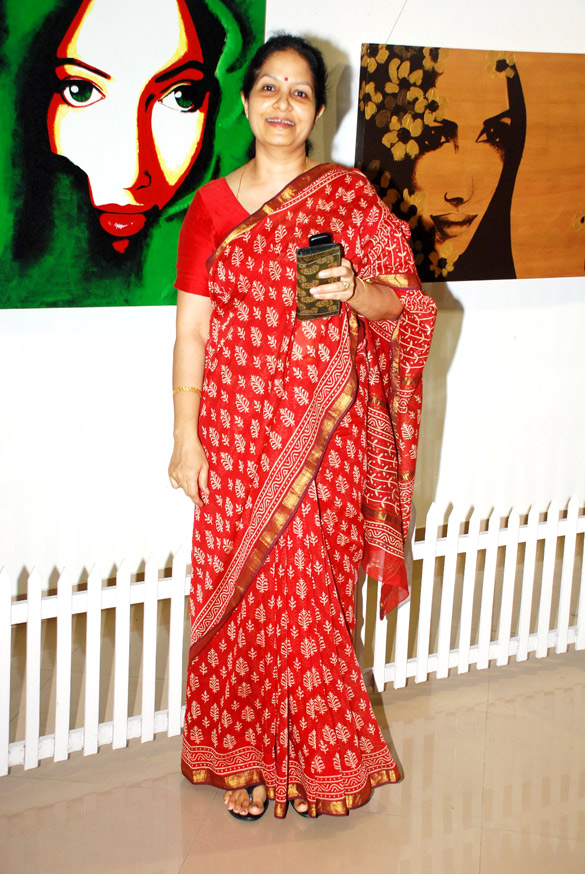

MP
- Constituency: Seoni

Personal details
- Born: 3 November 1962 (age 63) Chhatarpur, Madhya Pradesh
- Party: BJP
- Spouse: Hari Prakash Pateriya
- Children: 1 son and 2 daughters
- As of 22 September, 2006

Neeta Pateriya (born 3 November 1962) is a member of the 14th Lok Sabha of India. She represents the Seoni constituency of Madhya Pradesh and is a member of the Bharatiya Janata Party (BJP) political party.
