= Dinesh Gurjar =

Indian politician

- Born: 1969 (age 56–57)
- Occupation: Politician
- Political party: Indian National Congress

Dinesh Gurjar (born 1969) is an Indian politician from Madhya Pradesh, India. He is an MLA of Indian National Congress from Morena Assembly constituency. He won the 2023 Madhya Pradesh Legislative Assembly election. He received a total of 73,695 votes and won with the margin of 19,871 votes.

== Career ==
His political career started with the Youth Congress. In 1992, he became the President of the District Youth Congress. He won the election of District Panchayat member in 1994. He was also the Organization Minister in Seva Dal. In 2002, he became the state vice president of Youth Congress. In 2005-6 Gurjar became in-charge in UP elections. In 2013, he was the Congress candidate from the Morena assembly seat.
