= Babu Jandel =

Indian politician

Member of the Madhya Pradesh Legislative Assembly
- Incumbent
- Assumed office 2018
- Preceded by: Durgalal Vijay
- Constituency: Sheopur

Personal details
- Party: Indian National Congress
- Spouse: Ramsiya Bai
- Children: 2 Sons, 1 Daughter
- Parent: Ramchandra Patel (father)
- Profession: Politician
- As of 19 March, 2023 Source: ["Biography:Jandel, Babu" (PDF). Madhya Pradesh Legislative Assembly.]

Babu Jandel is an Indian politician who represents the Sheopur constituency. He is a member of the Indian National Congress political party.

== Political career ==
He was elected the Sarpanch of Gram Panchayat Sonthwa in the year 1994. He was elected as an MLA for the first time in 2018.

== Controversy ==
An FIR was registered against him for hurling abuses at a woman police officer in Sheopur.
