= Seoni Lok Sabha constituency =

Former Lok Sabha constituency in Madhya Pradesh, India

Coordinates: 22.089°N 79.550°E

Seoni
- Former Lok Sabha constituency

Constituency details
- Country: India
- Region: Central India
- State: Madhya Pradesh
- Established: First:1961; Second:1976
- Abolished: First:1967; Second:2008
- Reservation: None

Seoni was a Lok Sabha constituency in Madhya Pradesh. This seat was created in 1962 as a Scheduled Tribe seat. Following its inaugural appearance on the election rolls, Seoni ceased to exist for the next two general elections before it was made a permanent open seat in 1977.

== Members of Parliament ==
Year	Con. No.	Res.	Member	Party	Ref.
1962	MP-25	ST	Narayanrao Maniram Wadiwa	Indian National Congress	
Did not exist between 1967 and 1977
1977	MP-26	None	Nirmal Chandra Jain	Bharatiya Lok Dal	
1980	MP-26	None	Gargishaker Ramkrishna Mishra	Indian National Congress (Indira)	
1984	MP-26	None	Gargishanker Mishra	Indian National Congress	
1989	MP-26	None	Prahlad Singh	Bharatiya Janata Party	
1991	MP-26	None	Vimla Verma	Indian National Congress	
1996	MP-26	None	Prahlad Singh Patel	Bharatiya Janata Party	
1998	MP-26	None	Vimla Verma	Indian National Congress	
1999	MP-26	None	Ram Naresh Tripathi	Bharatiya Janata Party	
2004	MP-15	None	Neeta Pateriya	Bharatiya Janata Party	

== See also ==
- Seoni
- List of constituencies of the Lok Sabha
