= Satyapal Singh Sikarwar =

Indian politician

Satyapal Singh Sikarwar is an Indian politician and member of the Indian National Congress. Singh was a member of the Madhya Pradesh Legislative Assembly between 2013 and 2018 from the Sumawali constituency in Morena district. He was a member of the Bharatiya Janata Party till 2020 after which he shifted to Congress.

In 2024 Lok Sabha Election Sikarwar was defeated by 52530 votes. BJP's Shivmangal Singh Tomar won by 515477 votes.
