= Mukesh Malhotra =

Indian politician

Member of Madhya Pradesh Legislative Assembly
- Incumbent
- Assumed office 2024
- Preceded by: Ramnivas Rawat
- Constituency: Vijaypur

Personal details
- Party: Indian National Congress
- Profession: Politician

Mukesh Malhotra is an Indian politician from Madhya Pradesh. He is a member of the Madhya Pradesh Legislative Assembly since 2024, representing Vijaypur Assembly constituency as a member of the Indian National Congress.

== See also ==
- List of chief ministers of Madhya Pradesh
- Madhya Pradesh Legislative Assembly
