= Surendra Singh Thakur =

Indian politician

Member of Parliament Rajya Sabha
- In office 1986-1992
- Constituency: Madhya Pradesh

Personal details
- Born: 1954 (age 71–72)
- Party: Indian National Congress
- Spouse: Archna Thakur

Surendra Singh Thakur was an Indian politician. He was a Member of Parliament, representing Madhya Pradesh in the Rajya Sabha the upper house of India's Parliament representing the Indian National Congress.
