= Barelal Jatav =

Indian politician

Member of Parliament, Lok Sabha
- In office 1991–1996
- Preceded by: Chhabiram Argal
- Succeeded by: Ashok Argal
- Constituency: Morena, Madhya Pradesh

Personal details
- Party: Indian National Congress
- Spouse: Pushpa

Barelal Jatav is an Indian politician. He was elected to the Lok Sabha, lower house of the Parliament of India from Morena, Madhya Pradesh as a member of the Indian National Congress.
