= Morena Assembly constituency =

Constituency of the Madhya Pradesh legislative assembly

Coordinates: 26.49°N 77.99°E

Morena
- Constituency No. 6 for the Madhya Pradesh Legislative Assembly

Constituency details
- Country: India
- Region: Central India
- State: Madhya Pradesh
- District: Morena
- Lok Sabha constituency: Morena
- Established: 1951
- Reservation: None

Member of Legislative Assembly
- 16th Madhya Pradesh Legislative Assembly
- Incumbent Dinesh Gurjar
- Party: Indian National Congress
- Elected year: 2023
- Preceded by: Rakesh Mavai

Morena Assembly constituency is one of the 230 Vidhan Sabha (Legislative Assembly) constituencies of Madhya Pradesh state in central India. This constituency came into existence in 1951, as one of the 79 Vidhan Sabha constituencies of the erstwhile Madhya Bharat state.

Morena (constituency number 6) is one of the six Vidhan Sabha constituencies located in Morena district. This constituency covers the part of Morena tehsil.

Morena is part of Morena Lok Sabha constituency.

== Members of Legislative Assembly ==
Madhya Bharat
Year	Member	Party
1951	Shovarn Singh Kansana	Indian National Congress
1951	Karan Singh	Indian National Congress

Madhya Pradesh Legislative Assembly
Year	Member	Party
1957	Kunwar Yashwantsingh Kushwah	Indian National Congress
1957	Chameli Bai	Indian National Congress
1962	Jabar Singh	Praja Socialist Party
1967	Jabar Singh	Bharatiya Jana Sangh
1972	Maharaj Singh	Bharatiya Jana Sangh
1977	Jabar Singh	Janata Party
1980	Maharaj Singh Mavai	Indian National Congress (Indira)
1985	Jahar Singh Sharma	Bharatiya Janata Party
1990	Sevaram Gupta	Bharatiya Janata Party
1993	Sobran Singh Mavai	Indian National Congress
1998	Sevaram Gupta	Bharatiya Janata Party
2003	Rustam Singh	Bharatiya Janata Party
2008	Paras Ram Mudgal	Bahujan Samaj Party
2013	Rustam Singh	Bharatiya Janata Party
2018	Raghuraj Singh Kansana	Indian National Congress
2020^	Rakesh Mavai	Indian National Congress
2023	Dinesh Gurjar	Indian National Congress

^ bypolls

== Election results ==
=== 2023 ===
2023 Madhya Pradesh Legislative Assembly election: Morena
Party	Candidate	Votes	%	±%
INC	Dinesh Gurjar	73,695	43.2	+7.53
BJP	Raghuraj Singh Kansana	53,824	31.55	−0.27
BSP	Rakesh Rustam Singh	37,167	21.79	−7.04
AAP	Ramesh Upadhyay	1,932	1.13	
NOTA	None of the above	382	0.22	−0.34
Majority		19,871	11.65	+7.80
Turnout		170,598	64.89	+6.42
INC hold		Swing		

=== 2020 bypolls ===
2020 Madhya Pradesh Legislative Assembly by-elections: Morena
Party	Candidate	Votes	%	±%
INC	Rakesh Mavai	53,301	35.67	−9.95
BJP	Raghuraj Singh Kansana	47550	31.82	−0.01
BSP	Ramprakash Rajoriya	43084	28.83	+14.84
NOTA	None of the above	844	0.56	−0.19
Majority		5751	3.85	−9.94
Turnout		149449	58.47	−5.22
INC hold		Swing		

=== 2018 ===
2018 Madhya Pradesh Legislative Assembly election: Morena
Party	Candidate	Votes	%	±%
INC	Raghuraj Singh Kansana	68,965	45.62	
BJP	Rustam Singh	48,116	31.83	
BSP	Balvir Singh Dandotiya	21,149	13.99	
AAP	Ram Prakash Rajoriya	7,160	4.74	
NOTA	None of the above	1,138	0.75	
Majority		20,849	13.79	
Turnout		151,175	63.69	
INC gain from BJP		Swing		

== See also ==
- Morena
