= Narendra Singh Tomar =

Indian politician

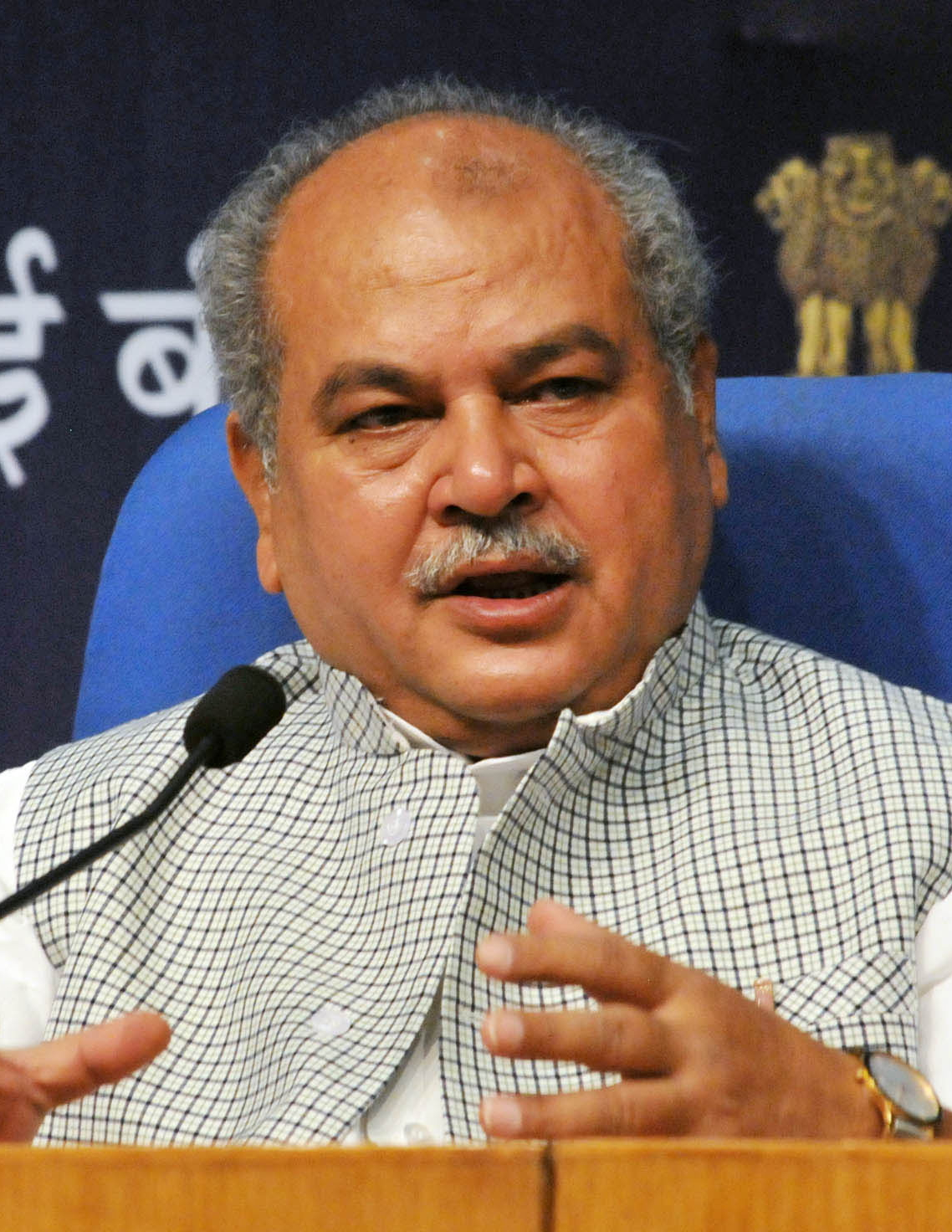
- Tomar addressing the media in New Delhi, 2017

15th Speaker of the Madhya Pradesh Legislative Assembly
- Incumbent
- Assumed office 20 December 2023
- Chief Minister: Mohan Yadav
- Preceded by: Girish Gautam

Member of Madhya Pradesh Legislative Assembly
- Incumbent
- Assumed office 3 December 2023
- Preceded by: Ravindra Singh Tomar Bhidosa
- Constituency: Dimani
- In office 1998–2008
- Preceded by: Raghuvir Singh
- Succeeded by: Pradhuman Singh Tomar
- Constituency: Gwalior

Union Cabinet Minister
- In office 26 May 2014 – 7 December 2023
- Prime Minister: Narendra Modi
- 30 May 2019 – 7 December 2023: Agriculture & Farmers' Welfare
- 5 July 2016 – 7 July 2021: Rural Development and Panchayati Raj
- 18 September 2020 – 7 July 2021: Food Processing Industries
- 13 November 2018 – 30 May 2019: Parliamentary Affairs
- 3 September 2017 – 30 May 2019: Mines
- 18 July 2017 – 3 September 2017: Housing and Urban Affairs
- 26 May 2014 – 5 July 2016: Steel and Mines
- 26 May 2014 – 9 November 2014: Labour and Employment

Member of Parliament, Lok Sabha
- In office 23 May 2019 – 3 December 2023
- Preceded by: Anoop Mishra
- Succeeded by: Shivmangal Singh Tomar
- Constituency: Morena, Madhya Pradesh
- In office 16 May 2014 – 23 May 2019
- Preceded by: Yashodhara Raje Scindia
- Succeeded by: Vivek Shejwalkar
- Constituency: Gwalior, Madhya Pradesh
- In office 31 May 2009 – 16 May 2014
- Preceded by: Ashok Chhaviram Argal
- Succeeded by: Anoop Mishra
- Constituency: Morena, Madhya Pradesh

Member of Parliament, Rajya Sabha
- In office 20 January 2009 – 16 May 2009
- Preceded by: Laxminarayan Sharma
- Constituency: Madhya Pradesh

President of the Bharatiya Janata Party, Madhya Pradesh
- In office 16 December 2012 – 16 August 2014
- Preceded by: Prabhat Jha
- Succeeded by: Nandkumar Singh Chauhan

Personal details
- Born: 12 June 1957 (age 69) Morar, Madhya Pradesh, India
- Party: Bharatiya Janata Party
- Spouse: Kiran Tomar (m. 1979)
- Children: 3
- Education: Jiwaji University

Narendra Singh Tomar (born 12 June 1957; Hindi pronunciation: [n̪əɾeːn̪d̪ɾə sɪŋgʱ t̪oːməɾ]) is an Indian politician and the speaker of the Madhya Pradesh Legislative Assembly since 2023. He is the former Minister of Agriculture and Farmers' Welfare. He has been Minister of Rural Development, Minister of Panchayati Raj, Minister of Mines and Minister of Parliamentary Affairs in the Government of India during different periods of the First and Second Modi ministry. He is a leader of Bharatiya Janata Party. He was also a member of Fifteenth Lok Sabha from 2009 to 2014 from Morena; Sixteenth Lok Sabha from 2014 to 2019 from Gwalior and 17th Lok Sabha from 2019 to 2023 from Morena. In 2019, he changed his constituency and was re-elected to the Lok Sabha from Morena.

== Early life and education ==
Tomar was born on 12 June 1957 in Morar village in Gwalior district (of Madhya Pradesh) in a Rajput family to Munshi Singh Tomar and Sharda Devi Tomar. He graduated from Jiwaji University. He is married to Kiran Tomar, with whom he has two sons and a daughter. He was nicknamed as Munna Bhaiya by Babulal Gaur.

== Political career ==
Tomar was appointed Union Cabinet Minister of Steel, Mines, Labour and Employment on 27 May 2014 in the cabinet headed by Narendra Modi. He was administered the oath of office and sworn in on 26 May 2014 by Pranab Mukherjee, the President of India.

On 5 July 2016, during the second cabinet reshuffle of the Narendra Modi ministry, Birender Singh replaced him as the Steel Minister and he replaced Birender Singh as the Minister of Panchayati Raj, Rural Development and Drinking Water and Sanitation. Piyush Goyal replaced Narendra Singh Tomar as the Minister of Mines (Minister of State with Independent charge).

In May 2019, he continued with Ministry of Rural Development and Panchayati Raj and was given charge of Ministry of Agriculture and Farmers Welfare.

On 18 September 2020, Tomar was assigned the additional charge of the Ministry of Food Processing Industries after Harsimrat Kaur Badal resigned from the post.

In the 2023 Madhya Pradesh Legislative Assembly election, Tomar contesting for Dimani defeated Bahujan Samaj Party's Balveer Singh Dandotiya by a margin of 24,000. Arjun Munda succeeded Tomar as the Minister of Agriculture and Farmers Welfare in December 2023.

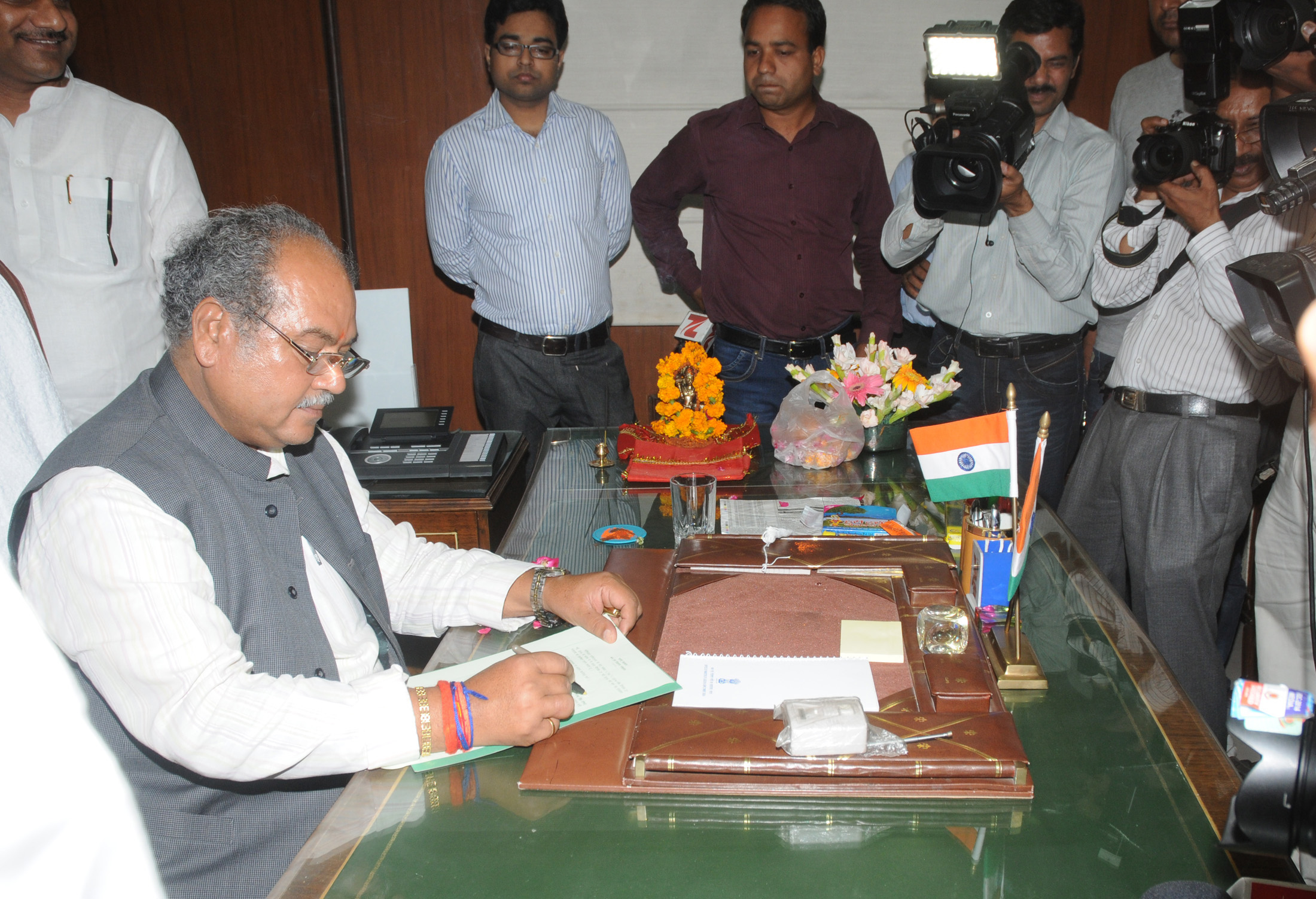
Narendra Singh Tomar taking charge as the Union Minister for Labour and Employment, in New Delhi on 27 May 2014

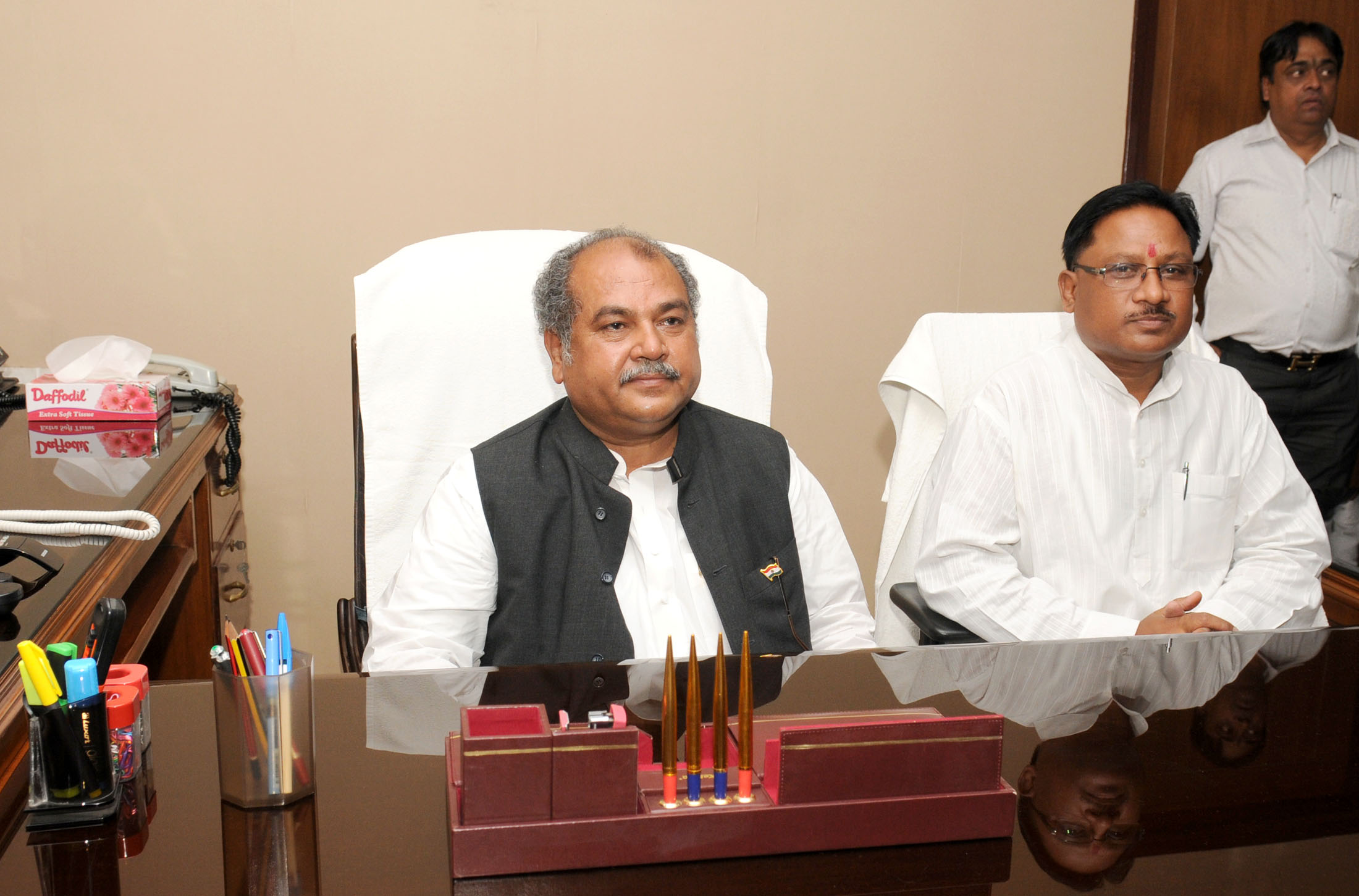
Tomar taking charge as the Union Minister for Mines, in New Delhi on 30 May 2014

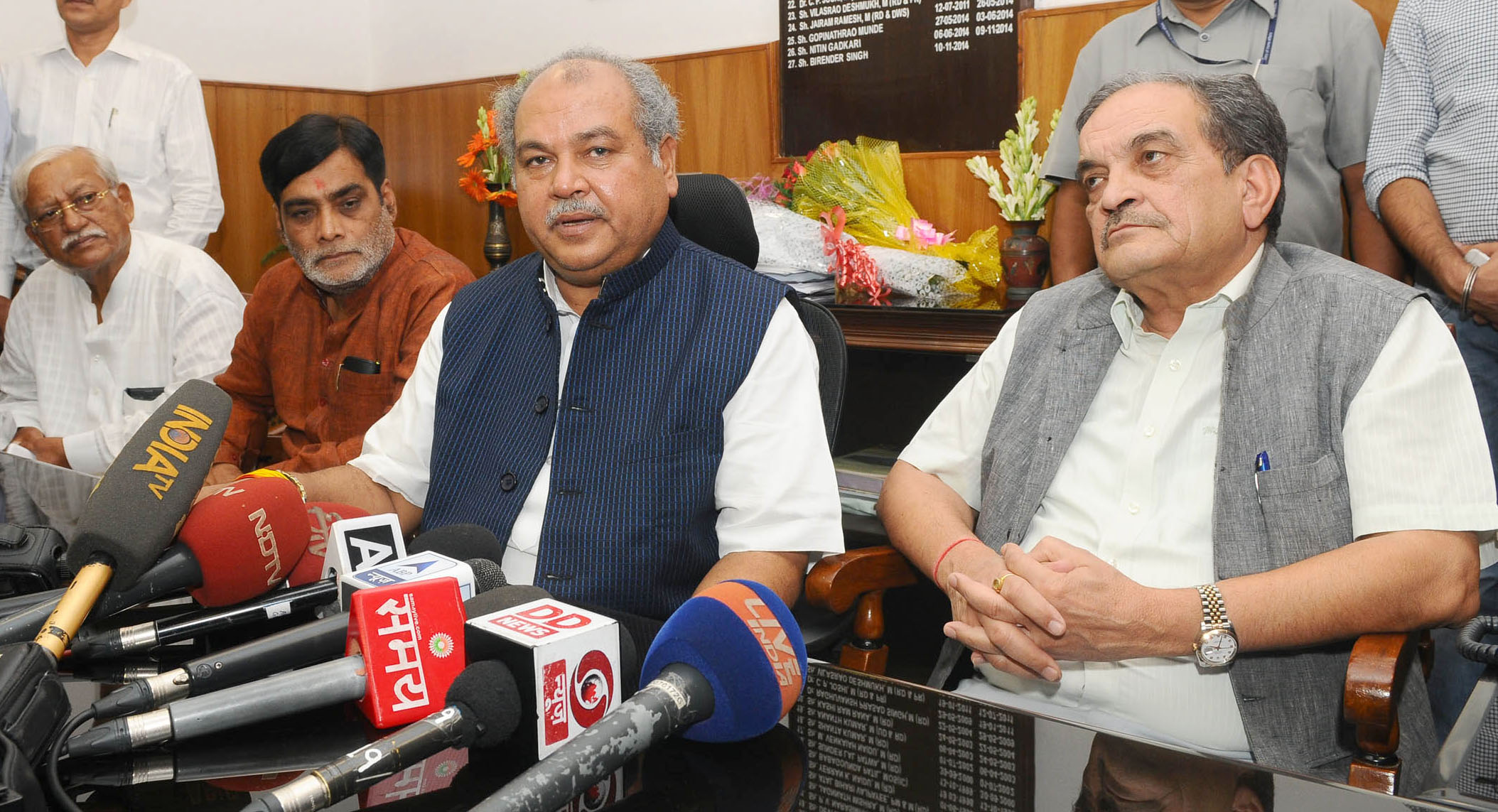
Tomar addressing a press conference after takes charge as Union Minister for Rural Development, Panchayati Raj, Drinking Water and Sanitation, in the presence of the Union Minister

== Offices held ==
Ministerial roles	Tenure of office	
Cabinet Minister of Madhya Pradesh	2003	2008
Minister of Labour & Employment	26 May 2014	9 November 2014
Minister of Mines	26 May 2014	5 July 2016
Minister of Steel	26 May 2014	5 July 2016
Minister of Drinking Water & Sanitation	5 July 2016	3 September 2017
Minister of Rural Development & Panchayati Raj	5 July 2016	7 July 2021
Minister of Housing & Urban Affairs	18 July 2017	3 September 2017
Minister of Mines	3 September 2017	30 May 2019
Minister of Parliamentary Affairs	13 November 2018	30 May 2019
Minister of Agriculture and Farmers' Welfare	30 May 2019	7 December 2023
Minister of Food Processing Industries	18 September 2020	7 July 2021

	Constituency	Tenure	
Member of Madhya Pradesh Legislative Assembly	Gwalior	1998	2008
Member of Parliament, Rajya Sabha	Madhya Pradesh	20 January 2009	16 May 2009
Member of Parliament, Lok Sabha	Morena	2009	2014
Member of Parliament, Lok Sabha	Gwalior	2014	2019
Member of Parliament, Lok Sabha	Morena	2019	6 December 2023
Member of Madhya Pradesh Legislative Assembly	Dimani	2023	Present

Lok Sabha
Preceded by Yashodhara Raje Scindia	Member of Parliament for Gwalior; 2014 – present	Succeeded by Incumbent
Political offices
Preceded by Sis Ram Ola	Minister of Labour and Employment; 26 May 2014 – 9 November 2014	Succeeded by Bandaru Dattatreya
Preceded by Beni Prasad Verma	Minister of Steel; 26 May 2014 – 5 July 2016	Succeeded by Chaudhary Birender Singh
Preceded by Dinsha Patel	Minister of Mines; 26 May 2014 – 5 July 2016	Succeeded by Piyush Goyal; Minister of State with Independent charge
Preceded by Chaudhary Birender Singh	Minister of Drinking Water and Sanitation; 5 July 2016 – 3 September 2017	Succeeded by Uma Bharti
Preceded by Chaudhary Birender Singh	Minister of Rural Development; 5 July 2016 – 7 July 2021	Succeeded by Giriraj Singh
Preceded by Chaudhary Birender Singh	Minister of Panchayati Raj; 5 July 2016 – 7 July 2021	Succeeded by Giriraj Singh
Preceded by Venkaiah Naidu	Minister of Urban Development; 18 July 2017 – 3 September 2017	Succeeded by Hardeep Singh Puri; Minister of State with Independent charge
Preceded by Venkaiah Naidu	Minister of Housing and Urban Poverty Alleviation; 18 July 2017 – 3 September 2017	Succeeded by Hardeep Singh Puri; Minister of State with Independent charge
Preceded by Piyush Goyal; Minister of State with Independent charge	Minister of Mines; 3 September 2017 – 30 May 2019	Succeeded by Pralhad Joshi
Preceded by Ananth Kumar	Minister of Parliamentary Affairs; 13 November 2018 – 20 May 2019	Succeeded by Pralhad Joshi
Preceded by Radha Mohan Singh	Minister of Agriculture and Farmers' Welfare; 30 May 2019 – 7 December 2023	Succeeded by Arjun Munda
Preceded by Harsimrat Kaur Badal	Minister of Food Processing Industries; 23 September 2020 – 7 July 2021	Succeeded by Pashupati Kumar Paras
