= Sitaram Aadivashi =

Indian politician (born 1959)

Member of the Madhya Pradesh Legislative Assembly since 2018 Sitaram Aadivashi

Member of Vijaypur, Madhya Pradesh Assembly constituency for 15th Madhya Pradesh Legislative Assembly
- Incumbent
- Assumed office 2018
- Preceded by: Ramniwas Rawat
- Constituency: Vijaypur

Personal details
- Born: 1 January 1959 (age 67) Baramati, Maharashtra, India
- Party: BJP
- Occupation: Politician
- Profession: Agriculture

Sitaram Aadivashi (born 1 January 1959) is an Indian politician who represented Vijaypur, Madhya Pradesh Assembly constituency in the 15th Madhya Pradesh Legislative Assembly. In 2018, he was elected as MLA from Vijaypur, Madhya Pradesh Assembly constituency as a member of the Bhartiya Janta Party.
