= Munvvar Saleem =

Indian politician

Chaudhary Munvvar Saleem

MP of Rajya Sabha for Uttar Pradesh
- In office 3 April 2012 – 2 April 2018
- Succeeded by: Ashok Bajpai, BJP

Personal details
- Born: 10 July 1959 (age 66) Vidisha, Madhya Pradesh
- Party: Samajwadi Party

Munvvar Saleem (born 10 July 1959) is a Member of the Parliament of India representing Uttar Pradesh for the Samajwadi Party in the Rajya Sabha, the upper house of the Indian Parliament.

He is a resident of Vidisha from Madhya Pradesh.
