= Rustam Singh (politician) =

Indian politician

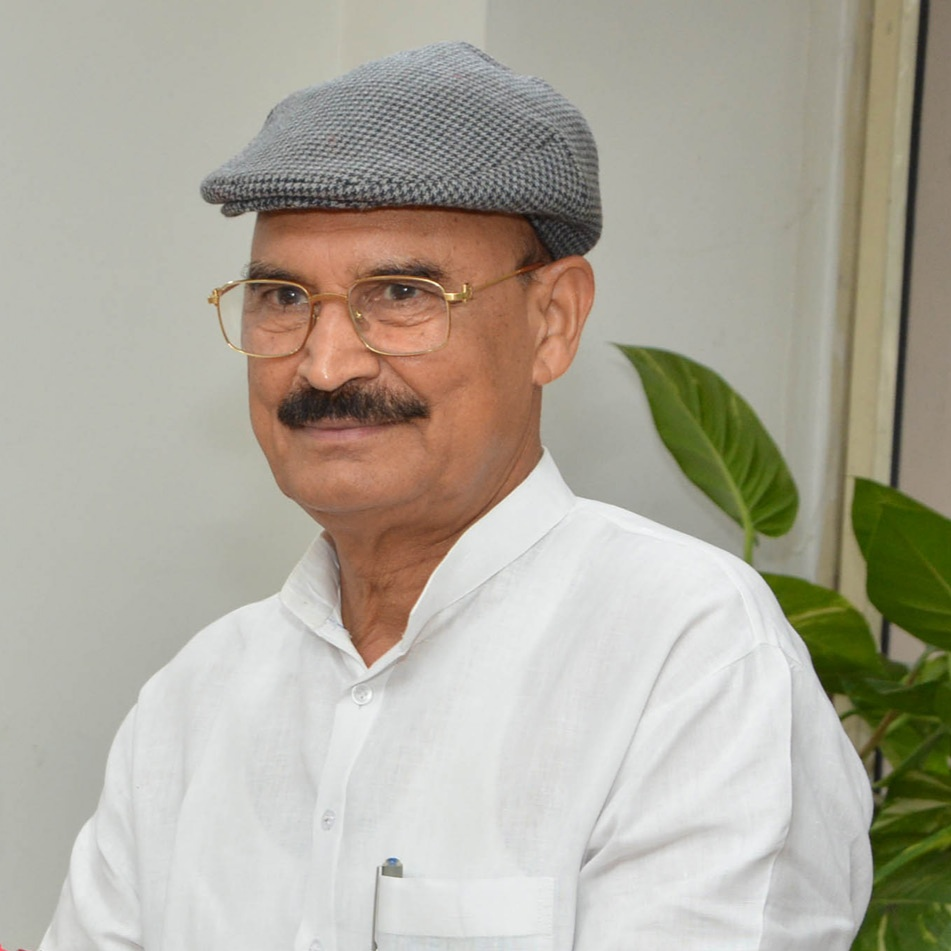
- Rustam Singh in 2016

Cabinet Minister, Madhya Pradesh
- In office 30 June 2016 – December 2018
- Ministry and Departments: Health and Family Welfare
- Succeeded by: Tulsi Silawat

Member of Madhya Pradesh Legislative Assembly
- In office 2013 – December 2018
- Succeeded by: Raghuraj Singh Kansana
- Constituency: Morena South

Personal details
- Born: 9 July 1945 (age 80)
- Party: Bahujan Samaj Party
- Other political affiliations: Bhartiya Janata Party (2003-2023)
- Profession: Politician

Rustam Singh (born July 9, 1945 in village Girgao Gwalior, (Madhya Pradesh) is an Indian politician and member of the Bahujan Samaj Party. He is a former member of Madhya Pradesh Assembly from South constituency of Morena. He lost in 2018 Madhya Pradesh Assembly election from Morena against the Indian National Congress leader.

He is a former IPS officer and served as Inspector General of Raipur.

== Political career ==
He was Minister of Sports and Youth Welfare, Food and Civil Supplies, Public Health and Family Welfare, Backward Classes and Minorities Welfare, Biodiversity and Biotechnology and Panchayat and Rural Development in 2003. He was re-inducted in Shivraj Singh Chouhan's cabinet as Minister of Public Health and Family Welfare.
