= Devendra Sakhwar =

Indian politician

- Born: 1976 (age 49–50)
- Other name: Devendra Ramnarayan Sakhwar
- Occupation: Politician
- Political party: Indian National Congress

Devendra Ramnarayan Sakhwar (born 1976) is an Indian politician from Madhya Pradesh, India. He is an MLA of Indian National Congress from Ambah Assembly constituency which is reserved for SC community in Morena district. He won the 2023 Madhya Pradesh Legislative Assembly election He received a total of 80,373 votes and won with the margin of 22,627 votes.
