= Shivmangal Singh Tomar =

Indian politician

Member of Parliament, Lok Sabha
- Incumbent
- Assumed office 4 June 2024
- Preceded by: Narendra Singh Tomar
- Constituency: Morena

Personal details
- Born: 1 December 1959 (age 66) Badagaon, Madhya Pradesh, India
- Party: Bharatiya Janata Party
- Spouse: Urmila
- Parent(s): Janak Singh Tomar, Kaushalya Devi

Shivmangal Singh Tomar (Hindi pronunciation: [ʃɪʋ.məŋgəl sɪŋgʱ t̪oːməɾ]) is an Indian politician. He was elected to the Lok Sabha, the lower house of the Parliament of India from Morena, Madhya Pradesh in the 2024 Indian general election as member of the Bharatiya Janata Party.

Tomar defeated INC's Satyapal Singh Sikarwar in 2024 Lok Sabha Election.
