= Ashok Chhaviram Argal =

Indian Politician

Member of Parliament, Lok Sabha
- In office 2009–2014
- Preceded by: Ram Lakhan Singh
- Succeeded by: Bhagirath Prasad
- Constituency: Bhind
- In office 1996–2009
- Preceded by: Barelal Jatav
- Succeeded by: Narendra Singh Tomar
- Constituency: Morena

Mayor of Morena
- In office 2015–2020

Personal details
- Born: 1 January 1969 (age 57) Sidhari Ka Pura village, Morena district, Madhya Pradesh
- Party: BJP
- Spouse: Suman Argal
- Children: 4 sons Bhupendra, Lokendra, Pravendra, Vikas
- As of 22 September, 2006

Ashok Chhaviram Argal (born 1 January 1969) is an Indian politician and a member of the Bharatiya Janata Party (BJP). In 1996, he was elected to the 11th Lok Sabha from Morena constituency in Madhya Pradesh. In 1998, 1999 and 2004, he was re-elected to the Lok Sabha from the same constituency. In 2009, he was re-elected to the Lok Sabha from Bhind constituency in Madhya Pradesh graduate in 2008-09 from Chitrakoot gramoday Vishwavidyalaya.

== Political career ==
In the 2009 election he was elected to the 15th Lok Sabha from the Bhind Lok Sabha constituency of Madhya Pradesh.

== Personal life ==
Argal is married to Smt Suman Argal and has 4 sons.
