= Gwalior Lok Sabha constituency =

Lok Sabha Constituency in Madhya Pradesh, India

Coordinates: 26.22°N 78.17°E

Gwalior
- Lok Sabha constituency
- Interactive Map Outlining Gwalior Lok Sabha constituency

Constituency details
- Country: India
- Region: Central India
- State: Madhya Pradesh
- Assembly constituencies: Gwalior Rural; Gwalior; Gwalior East; Gwalior South; Bhitarwar; Dabra; Karera; Pohari
- Established: 1952
- Total electors: 21,54,601
- Reservation: None

Member of Parliament
- 18th Lok Sabha
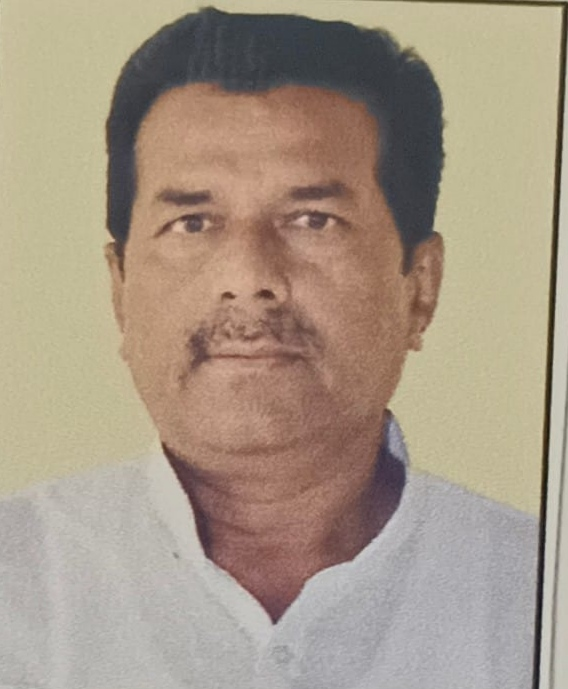
- Incumbent Bharat Singh Kushwah
- Party: Bharatiya Janata Party
- Elected year: 2024

Gwalior is one of the 29 Lok Sabha constituencies in the Indian state of Madhya Pradesh state. This constituency covers the entire Gwalior district and part of Shivpuri district.

== Assembly segments ==
Gwalior Lok Sabha constituency currently comprises the following eight Vidhan Sabha (Legislative Assembly) segments:

#	Name	District	Member	Party	2024 Lead
14	Gwalior Rural	Gwalior	Sahab Singh Gurjar	INC	BJP
15	Gwalior	Gwalior	Pradhuman Singh Tomar	BJP	BJP
16	Gwalior East	Gwalior	Satish Sikarwar	INC	INC
17	Gwalior South	Gwalior	Narayan Singh Kushwah	BJP	BJP
18	Bhitarwar	Gwalior	Mohan Singh Rathore	BJP	INC
19	Dabra (SC)	Gwalior	Suresh Raje	INC	INC
23	Karera (SC)	Shivpuri	Ramesh Prasad Khatik	BJP	BJP
24	Pohari	Shivpuri	Kailash Kushwah	INC	BJP

== Members of Parliament ==
Year	Winner	Party
1952	V. G. Deshpande	Akhil Bharatiya Hindu Mahasabha
1952^	Narayan Bhaskar Khare	Akhil Bharatiya Hindu Mahasabha
1957	Suraj Prasad	Indian National Congress
1962	Vijaya Raje Scindia	Indian National Congress
1967	Ram Awtar Sharma	Bharatiya Jana Sangh
1971	Atal Bihari Vajpayee	Bharatiya Jana Sangh
1977	Narayan Shejwalkar	Janata Party
1980	Narayan Shejwalkar	Janata Party
1984	Madhavrao Scindia	Indian National Congress
1989	Madhavrao Scindia	Indian National Congress
1991	Madhavrao Scindia	Indian National Congress
1996	Madhavrao Scindia	Madhya Pradesh Vikas Congress
1998	Madhavrao Scindia	Indian National Congress
1999	Jaibhan Singh Pawaiya	Bhartiya Janata Party
2004	Ramsevak Singh	Indian National Congress
2007^	Yashodhara Raje Scindia	Bharatiya Janata Party
2009	Yashodhara Raje Scindia	Bharatiya Janata Party
2014	Narendra Singh Tomar	Bharatiya Janata Party
2019	Vivek Shejwalkar	Bharatiya Janata Party
2024	Bharat Singh Kushwah	Bharatiya Janata Party

BJP/BJS/ABHM is the most successful political group in Gwalior Lok Sabha elections.
1. BJP/BJS/ABHM (10 terms) (50.0%)
2. INC (7 terms) (35.0%)
3. JP (2 terms) (10.0%)
4. MPVC (1 term) (5.00%)
- ^By Election

== Election results ==
Vote share of winning candidates
2024	49.99%
2019	52.44%
2014	44.68%
2009	43.19%
2007 by-election	37.43%
2004	40.91%
1999	41.27%
1998	39.77%
1996	66.33%
1989	57.89%

=== 2024 Lok Sabha Election ===
2024 Indian general election: Gwalior
Party	Candidate	Votes	%	±%
BJP	Bharat Singh Kushwah	671,535	49.99	▼2.45
INC	Praveen Pathak	6,01,325	44.77	▲4.61
BSP	Kalyan Singh Kansana	33,465	2.49	−1.25
NOTA	None of the above	3,341	0.25	
Majority		70,210	5.22	▼7.06
Turnout		13,43,229	62.13	▲2.31
BJP hold		Swing		

=== 2019 Lok Sabha Election ===
2019 Indian general elections: Gwalior
Party	Candidate	Votes	%	±%
BJP	Vivek Narayan Shejwalkar	627,250	52.44	+7.76
INC	Ashok Singh	4,80,408	40.16	−1.52
BSP	Mamta Singh Kushwaha	44,677	3.74	−3.14
IND.	Govind Singh	6,320	0.53	
PPI(D)	Geeta Rani Kushwah	5,566	0.47	
Majority		1,46,842	12.28	+9.28
Turnout		11,96,888	59.82	+7.02
BJP hold		Swing		

=== 2014 Lok Sabha Election ===
2014 Indian general elections: Gwalior
Party	Candidate	Votes	%	±%
BJP	Narendra Singh Tomar	4,42,796	44.68	+1.39
INC	Ashok Singh	4,13,097	41.68	+3.04
BSP	Alok Sharma	68,196	6.88	−6.21
AAP	Neelam Agrwal	11,510	1.16	N/A
CPI(M)	Akhilesh Yadav	10,297	1.04	N/A
SP	Balwant Singh Kushwah	5,327	0.54	N/A
Independent	Asif Khan	4,969	0.50	N/A
Jan Nyay Dal	C.L. Karodiya	4,719	0.48	N/A
NOTA	None of the Above	4,219	0.43	
Majority		29,699	3.00	
Turnout		9,90,912	52.80	
BJP hold		Swing		

=== 2009 Lok Sabha Election ===
2009 Indian general elections: Gwalior
Party	Candidate	Votes	%	±%
BJP	Yashodhara Raje Scindia	2,52,314	43.19	
INC	Ashok Singh	2,25,723	38.64	
BSP	Ajab Singh Kushwah	76,481	13.09	
IND.	Jagadish Gobara	3,943	0.67	
LJP	Avtar Singh	3,341	0.57	
Majority		26,591	4.55	
Turnout		5,84,196	41.12	
BJP hold		Swing		

==== 2007 bye-election ====
By Election, 2007: Gwalior
Party	Candidate	Votes	%	±%
BJP	Yashodhara Raje Scindia	2,13,583	37.43	
INC	Ashok Singh	1,77,109	31.04	
RSD	Ramshree Baghel	51,308	8.99	
BSP	Kedar Singh Bidhuri	35,707	6.26	
LJP	Phool Singh Baraiya	31,844	5.58	
SP	Munna Lal Goyal	16,829	2.95	
Majority		36,474	6.39	
Turnout		5,70,609	41.38	
BJP gain from INC		Swing		

=== 2004 Lok Sabha Election ===
2004 Indian general elections: Gwalior
Party	Candidate	Votes	%	±%
INC	Ramsevak Singh(babuji) Gurjar	2,46,467	40.91	
BJP	Jaibhan Singh Pawaiya	2,10,603	34.96	
RSMD	Sukhlal Kushwaha	40,639	6.74	
BSP	Madan Kushwah	30,405	5.05	
SP	Khyaliram Baghel	18,625	3.09	

=== 1999 Lok Sabha Election ===
1999 Indian general elections: Gwalior
Party	Candidate	Votes	%	±%
BJP	Jaibhan Singh Pawaiya	2,54,486	41.27	
INC	Chandra Mohan Nagori	1,71,370	27.79	
BSP	Phool Singh Baraiya	1,16,678	18.92	
SP	Babusingh Gurjar	34,406	5.58	
Independent	Santosh	10,687	1.73	

=== 1998 Lok Sabha Election ===
1998 Indian general elections: Gwalior
Party	Candidate	Votes	%	±%
INC	Madhavrao Scindia	2,84,365	39.77	
BJP	Jaibhan Singh Pawaiya	2,58,086	36.09	
BSP	Phool Singh Baraiya	1,36,808	19.13	
JD	Jwalaprasad Kushwah	17,270	2.42	

=== 1996 Lok Sabha Election ===
1996 Indian general elections: Gwalior
Party	Candidate	Votes	%	±%
Madhya Pradesh Vikas Congress	Madhavrao Scindia	3,37,539	66.33	
BSP	Phool Singh Baraiya	1,13,545	22.31	
INC	Shashibhushan Bajpai	28,730	5.65	
Independent	Shivraj Kushwah	6,178	1.21	

=== 1989 Lok Sabha Election ===
1989 Indian general election: Gwalior
Party	Candidate	Votes	%	±%
INC	Madhavrao Scindia	279,799	57.89	
BJP	Sheetla Saha	130,374	26.97	
BSP	Phool Singh Baraiya	36,618	7.58	
CPI(M)	Badal Saroj	8,888	1.84	
Independent	Pradhan Kishore	5,431	1.12	
Independent	S.K. Singh Chauhan	3,436	0.71	
DDP	Sarnam Singh Kirar	3,278	0.68	
Turnout		483,368	51.81	
INC hold		Swing		

=== 1984 Lok Sabha Election ===
- Madhavrao Scindia (Congress) : 307,735
- Atal Bihari Vajpayee (BJP) : 132,141

Political sources claim that Scindia had told Vajpayee that he would be contesting from Guna, but changed his seat very late. The sympathy wave for Congress was so strong that Vajpayee could have lost the election in any case, but Scindia's candidacy made his defeat certain. Jana Sangh / BJP had won this seat even in the Indira waves of 1971 and 1980.

=== 1971 Lok Sabha Election ===
- Atal Bihari Vajpayee (BJP) : 188,995
- Gautam Sharma (Congress) : 118,685

=== 1952 Lok Sabha Election ===
General Elections 1952 V G Deshpande (Hindu Mahasabha) won from both Gwalior and Guna. He retained Guna seat, and resigned from Gwalior. The by-election for Gwalior seat was won by N B Khare, also of Hindu Maha Sabha. In 1930s, Khare had been Chief Minister (called 'Premier' in those days) of Central Province as a Congress politician. But he left the party later.

== Sources ==
- Election Commission of India - Report

== See also ==
- Gwalior district
- List of constituencies of the Lok Sabha
