= Madhu Verma =

Madhu Verma may refer to:

- Madhu Verma (economist)
- Madhu Verma (politician)
