= Karera Assembly constituency =

Constituency of the Madhya Pradesh legislative assembly in India

Coordinates: 25.46°N 78.13°E

Karera
- Constituency No. 23 for the Madhya Pradesh Legislative Assembly

Constituency details
- Country: India
- Region: Central India
- State: Madhya Pradesh
- District: Shivpuri
- Lok Sabha constituency: Gwalior
- Established: 1951
- Reservation: SC

Member of Legislative Assembly
- 16th Madhya Pradesh Legislative Assembly
- Incumbent Ramesh Prasad Khatik
- Party: Bharatiya Janata Party
- Elected year: 2023
- Preceded by: Pragilal Jatav

Karera is one of the 230 Vidhan Sabha (Legislative Assembly) constituencies of Madhya Pradesh state in central India. This constituency is reserved for the candidates belonging to the Scheduled castes. This constituency came into existence in 1951, as one of the 79 Vidhan Sabha constituencies of the erstwhile Madhya Bharat state.

== Overview ==
Karera (constituency number 23) is one of the 5 Vidhan Sabha constituencies located in Shivpuri district. This constituency covers the entire Karera tehsil and part of Narwar tehsil of the district.

Karera is part of Gwalior Lok Sabha constituency along with seven other Vidhan Sabha segments, namely, Pohari in this district and Gwalior Rural, Gwalior, Gwalior East, Gwalior South, Bhitarwar and Dabra in Gwalior district.

== Members of the Legislative Assembly ==
Madhya Bharat Legislative Assembly
Election	Name	Party
1952	Bhagwan Dass	Hindu Mahasabha

Madhya Pradesh Legislative Assembly
Election	Name	Party
1957	Gautam Sharma	Indian National Congress
1962	Gautam Sharma	Indian National Congress
1967	Vijaya Raje Scindia	Bharatiya Jana Sangh
1972	Hardas Gupta	Bharatiya Jana Sangh
1977	Sushma Singh	Janata Party
1980	Hanumant Singh Dau	Indian National Congress (Indira)
1985	Hanumant Singh Dau	Indian National Congress
1990	Bhagwat Singh Yadav	Bharatiya Janata Party
1993	Kiran Singh Rawat	Indian National Congress
1998	Ranveer Singh	Bharatiya Janata Party
2003	Lakhan Singh Baghel	Bahujan Samaj Party
2008	Ramesh Prasad Khatik	Bharatiya Janata Party
2013	Shakuntala Khatik	Indian National Congress
2018	Jasmant Jatav	Indian National Congress
2020^	Pragilal Jatav	Indian National Congress
2023	Ramesh Prasad Khatik	Bharatiya Janata Party

== Election results ==
=== 2023 ===
2023 Madhya Pradesh Legislative Assembly election: Karera (SC)
Party	Candidate	Votes	%	±%
BJP	Ramesh Prasad Khatik	99,304	49.11	+12.74
INC	Pragilal Jatav	96,201	47.58	−5.91
NOTA	None of the above	1,683	0.83	−0.18
Majority		3,103	1.53	−15.59
Turnout		202,198	76.22	+2.49
BJP gain from INC		Swing		

=== 2020 bypolls ===
2020 Madhya Pradesh Legislative Assembly by-elections: Karera
Party	Candidate	Votes	%	±%
INC	Pragilal Jatav	95,728	53.49	+16.48
BJP	Jasmant Jatav	65087	36.37	+7.90
SP	Dinesh Parihar	7023	3.92	
Rashtriya Shoshit Samaj Party	Rajkumari Prajapati	3177	1.78	
BSP	Rajendra Prasad	2547	1.42	−21.66
NOTA	None of the above	1813	1.01	−0.06
Majority		30641	17.12	+8.58
Turnout		178978	73.73	+0.16
BJP gain from INC		Swing		

=== 2018 ===
2018 Madhya Pradesh Legislative Assembly election: Karera
Party	Candidate	Votes	%	±%
INC	Jasmant Jatav	64,201	37.01	
BJP	Rajkumar Omprakash Khatik	49,377	28.47	
BSP	Pragilal Jatav	40,026	23.08	
Sapaks Party	Ramesh Prasad Khatik	9,098	5.25	
NOTA	None of the above	1,850	1.07	
Majority		14,824	8.54	
Turnout		173,452	73.57	
INC hold		Swing		

=== 2013 ===
2013 Madhya Pradesh Legislative Assembly election: Karera
Party	Candidate	Votes	%	±%
INC	Shakuntala Khatik	59,371	36.12	
BJP	Omprakash Khatik	49051	29.84	
BSP	Pragilal Jatav	45265	27.53	
BA S D	Dr Rajaram Bijoul	1870	1.14	
Independent	Raju	1491	0.91	
Independent	Mishrilal Barahar	1468	0.89	N/A
AASP	Deendayal Jatav	1439	0.88	N/A
Independent	Anita Devi	921	0.56	N/A
Independent	Bharat Parihar	658	0.40	N/A
NOTA	None of the Above	2866	1.74	
Majority				
Turnout		164400	72.11	
INC hold		Swing		

== See also ==
- Karera
