= Bharat Singh Kushwah =

Former Minister in Government of Madhya Pradesh

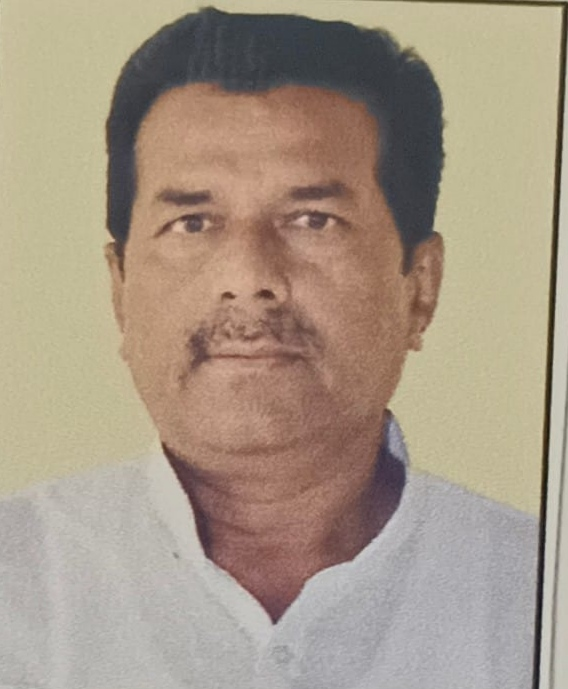

Member of Parliament, Lok Sabha
- Incumbent
- Assumed office 4 June 2024
- Preceded by: Vivek Narayan Shejwalkar
- Constituency: Gwalior Lok Sabha constituency

Member of the Madhya Pradesh Legislative Assembly
- In office 2013–2023
- Preceded by: Madan Kushwah
- Succeeded by: Sahab Singh Gurjar
- Constituency: Gwalior Rural Assembly constituency

Personal details
- Born: 4 September 1970 (age 55) Gwalior, Madhya Pradesh, India
- Party: Bharatiya Janata Party

Bharat Singh Kushwah, (born 4 September 1970; Hindi pronunciation: [bʱəɾət̪ sɪŋgʱ kʊʃ.ʋaːɦ]) alternatively spelt as Bharat Singh Kushwaha, is an Indian politician from Madhya Pradesh, who was elected to Madhya Pradesh Legislative Assembly from Gwalior Rural Assembly constituency in 2013 Madhya Pradesh Assembly elections. Kushwah is a member of Bharatiya Janata Party and has served as Minister of State in the Ministry of Horticulture and Food Processing (Independent Charge) of Madhya Pradesh. He is a two term MLA from Gwalior Rural Assembly constituency. In 2024 Indian general election, he was elected to Lok Sabha from Gwalior Lok Sabha constituency.

== Life and career ==
Kushwah was pitted against Indian National Congress candidate, Madan Kushwah in the 2013 Madhya Pradesh Legislative Assembly election. He was able to defeat him in this election. In 2018, he was able to retain the constituency, becoming the member of Madhya Pradesh Legislative Assembly for the second time. The electoral contest of 2018 became triangular as Bahujan Samaj Party announced Sahab Singh Gurjar to be its candidate.

In 2024 Indian general election, he was made a candidate of Bharatiya Janata Party from Gwalior Lok Sabha constituency. He defeated Praveen Pathak of Indian National Congress and was elected to Lok Sabha in this election.

In October 2024, a video of Kushwah got viral in which he was seen walking across various places in his constituency and meeting the ordinary people. He was also spotted promoting the small scale traders and asking the people shopping for Diwali to purchase from them to make the economy strong. Later, it was covered in news media as wll.

== Personal life ==
He belongs to OBC community. and has been a prominent face of BJP in Madhya Pradesh.

== Controversies ==
During the voting process in 2023 Madhya Pradesh Legislative Assembly election, murder of four people belonging to Rajput caste took place in Chakrampur village of Shivpuri region. There were allegations against Kushwah that he was involved in protecting the perpetrators. This incident happened on 17 November 2023, when some people belonging to Kushwaha caste were allegedly trying to do frivolous voting in the favour of Indian National Congress, Kailash Kushwah on the Chakrampur polling booth in Shivpuri district. When stopped by Rajput people, who were supporters of Bharatiya Janata Party candidate, the people belonging to Kushwaha caste surrounded them and tried to burn them alive inside their vehicle, while they left the polling booth. On beling unsuccessful in their attempt, the perpetrators thrashed them badly leading to the death of four Rajput people belonging to same family.

This village falls under Pohari Assembly constituency and there was massive protest by the people belonging to Rajput caste after the incident.

== Election results ==
=== 2024 Indian general election ===
2024 Indian general election: Gwalior
Party	Candidate	Votes	%	±%
BJP	Bharat Singh Kushwah	6,71,535	49.99	
INC	Praveen Pathak	6,01,325	44.77	
NOTA	None of the above	3341		
Majority		70,210		
Turnout		13,43,229	62.13	▲2.31
gain from		Swing		
