= Vivek Shejwalkar =

Politician from Madhya Pradesh, India

Member of Parliament, Lok Sabha
- In office 23 May 2019 – 4 June 2024
- Preceded by: Narendra Singh Tomar
- Succeeded by: Bharat Singh Kushwah
- Constituency: Gwalior

Mayor, Gwalior
- In office 2005–2010
- Succeeded by: Sameeksha Gupta
- In office 2015–2019
- Succeeded by: Shobha Sikarwar

Personal details
- Born: 13 June 1947 (age 79) Bombay, Bombay Presidency, British India
- Party: Bharatiya Janata Party
- Spouse: Nilima Shejwalkar
- Children: 2
- Parents: Narain Krishna Rao Shejwalkar (father); Vimal Shejwalkar (mother)
- Education: Jiwaji University
- Profession: Social Worker

Vivek Narayan Shejwalkar (born 13 June 1947; Hindi pronunciation: [ʋɪʋeːk n̪aːɾaːjəɳ ʃeːd͡ʒ.ʋəlkəɾ]) is an Indian politician. He was elected to the Lok Sabha, lower house of the Parliament of India from Gwalior, Madhya Pradesh in the 2019 Indian general election as member of the Bharatiya Janata Party.

His father Narain Krishna Rao Shejwalkar was elected to 6th Lok Sabha and 7th Lok Sabha from Gwalior (Lok Sabha constituency) in 2019. He was also a Mayor of Gwalior Municipal Corporation. He did is BE in electrical engineering from Jiwaji University and Madhav University Gwalior
