= Rau Colony =

- suburb
- Location in Madhya Pradesh, India Rau Colony (India)
- Coordinates: 22.42°N 75.54°E
- Country: India
- State: Madhya Pradesh
- District: Indore

Population (2010)
  - Total: 12,000

Languages
  - Official: Hindi
- Time zone: UTC+5:30 (IST)
- PIN: 453331
- Telephone code: 0731
- Vehicle registration: 09
- Nearest city: Rau

Rau Colony (हिंदी,राऊ कालोनी), also known as Shramik Colony (हिंदी, श्रमिक कालोनी). Rau Colony is a residential locality in Indore, Madhya Pradesh, India.

Elected Member of the Legislative Assembly:Anjali Kushwaha

== Overview ==
Rau colony is a gateway for Rau, one of the Industrial, Business and Educational Hub of the city. The आकाशवाणी tower is placed in here, and The Emerald Heights International School is situated Opposite आकाशवाणी.

The area holds a few houses and rough infrastructures. There are many small and middle shops in the area. There are many hostels for the students.

In Rau and Shramik Colony, Hindu and Muslim are live together.

== Society Flats in Rau ==
Currently, the area is under the hands of land lords and Zamindars of the locality. The area roughly has 200-250 houses

== Getting there ==
=== Bus routes ===
- 25-
- 26-

=== Train ===
Railway station is approx 2 km ahead (in Rau) of the city Indore Junction BG at (INDB)

== Temples ==
- Shiv Mandir (शिव मंदिर).
- Ganesh Mandir (गणेश मंदिर).
- Mosque (मस्जिद).

== School ==
- Gramin Jivan Jyoti School (run by trust).
- Government Middle School.
- Royal Public School.
- Satyam Public School.
- Madarsa (मदरसा).
