= Satish Sikarwar =

Indian politician

Member of Madhya Pradesh Legislative Assembly
- Incumbent
- Assumed office 2023
- Preceded by: Munnalal Goyal
- Constituency: Gwalior East

Personal details
- Party: Indian National Congress
- Other political affiliations: Bharatiya Janata Party
- Profession: Politician

Satish Sikarwar is an Indian politician from Madhya Pradesh. He is a Member of the Madhya Pradesh Legislative Assembly from 2023, representing Gwalior East Assembly constituency as a Member of the Indian National Congress.

== Political career ==
In the 2018 Madhya Pradesh Assembly Election, Sikarwar contested as a candidate from the Bharatiya Janata Party. He lost to Munnalal Goyal, the Indian National Congress candidate, by a margin of 17,819 votes.

In 2023, Sikarwar joined the Indian National Congress and was fielded as a candidate from the Gwalior East constituency. He won the election, defeating the BJP candidate Maya Singh by a margin of 15,353 votes. In the 2023 Madhya Pradesh Assembly Election, Sikarwar secured a total of 1,00,301 votes, while Maya Singh received 84,948 votes.he is a Rajput

== See also ==
- 2023 Madhya Pradesh Legislative Assembly election
- Madhya Pradesh Legislative Assembly
