= N. K. Shejwalkar =

Indian politician

Narain Krishna Rao Shejwalkar (1923–2000) was member of Lok Sabha from Gwalior. He was elected to 6th and 7th Lok Sabha from Gwalior (Lok Sabha constituency). He also served as member of Rajya Sabha. He was Mayor of Gwalior Municipal Corporation during 1970–71.

His son Vivek Shejwalkar was elected to 17th Lok Sabha from Gwalior (Lok Sabha constituency) in 2019. He was also a Mayor of Gwalior Municipal Corporation.
