= Suresh Pachouri =

Indian politician

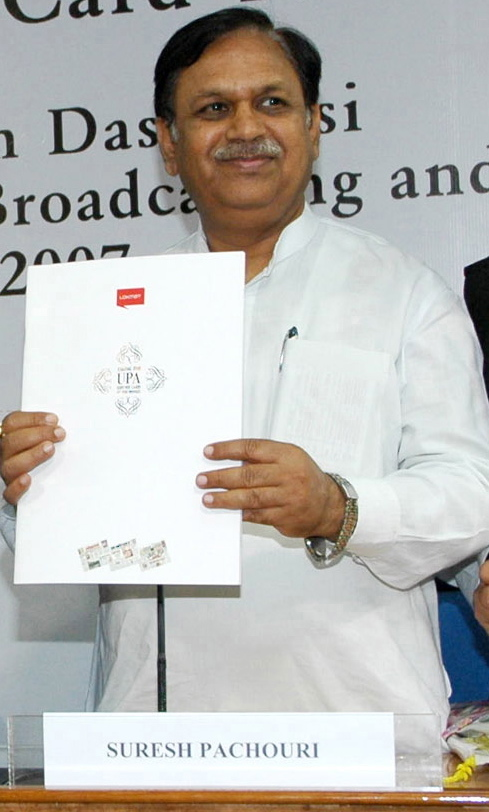

Minister of State, Personnel, Public Grievances and Pensions, and Parliamentary Affairs
- In office 23 May 2004 – 6 April 2008
- Prime Minister: Manmohan Singh
- Succeeded by: Prithviraj Chavan & V. Narayanasamy

Minister of State, Defence (Defence Production and Supplies)
- In office 10 June 1995 – 16 May 1996
- Prime Minister: P. V. Narasimha Rao

Member of Parliament, Rajya Sabha
- In office 10 April 1984 – 9 April 2008
- Constituency: Madhya Pradesh

President, Madhya Pradesh Congress Committee
- In office 17 February 2008 – 5 April 2011
- Preceded by: Subhash Yadav
- Succeeded by: Kantilal Bhuria

Personal details
- Born: 1 July 1952 (age 74) Bhopal, Bhopal State, India
- Party: Bharatiya Janata Party (2024–present)
- Other political affiliations: Indian National Congress (1972–2024)
- Spouse: Suparna S. Pachouri
- Children: 2
- Education: Sofia Art and Commerce College, Bhopal (LLB); Maulana Azad National Institute of Technology (B.E)

Suresh Pachouri (born 1 July 1952) is an Indian politician and member of Bharatiya Janata Party from Madhya Pradesh. He had served as union minister of state in the Ministry of Defence (1995-1996) and the Ministry of Personnel, Public Grievances and Pensions and Ministry of Parliamentary Affairs (2004-2008) in the Government of India.

== Personal life ==
Pachouri was born on 1 July 1952 to Kalika Prasad. He graduated with a Bachelor of Engineering degree in mechanical engineering from Maulana Azad National Institute of Technology, Bhopal in 1983. He also received an LLB degree from Sofia Art and Commerce College, Bhopal in 2002. He is married to Suparna S. Pachouri, with whom he has two sons.

== Political career ==
Pachouri is one of the senior most former leaders of Indian National Congress and he entered politics as an Indian Youth Congress worker in 1972. He was the General Secretary of the Madhya Pradesh Youth Congress(I) from 1981 to 1983. He then became President of the Madhya Pradesh Youth Congress from 1984 to 1985. He was General Secretary of the Indian Youth Congress from 1985 to 1988. He was first elected to the Rajya Sabha in 1984 and re-elected in 1990, 1996 & 2002. He was the Minister of State in the Ministry of Defence from 1995 to 1996. He was the Chairman of the Congress Seva Dal. He was a Member of the Consultative Committee of the Ministry of Home Affairs and Defence and was also nominated to the Panel of Deputy Chairman of the Rajya Sabha in 2000. He served as a Minister of State in the Ministry of Personnel, Public Grievances and Pensions and Ministry of Parliamentary Affairs from 24 May 2004 – 6 April 2008. He was the President of the Madhya Pradesh Congress Committee from 14 February 2008 – 5 April 2011. He has also served as the Convener of the Research and Coordination Department of the All India Congress Committee. He joined Bharatiya Janata Party on 9 March 2024.

== Positions held ==
- 1981-83: General secretary of Madhya Pradesh Youth Congress
- 1984-85: President of Madhya Pradesh youth congress
- 1985-88: General secretary of Indian youth congress
- 1984-90: Member of parliament, Rajyasabha
- 1990: Member of consultative committee of Ministry of Home affairs and Defence
- 1990-96: Member of Parliament, Rajyasabha
- 1995-96: Union minister of state for Defence Production
- 1996-2002: Member of parliament, Rajyasabha
- 2000: Vice chairman of Rajyasabha (Panel)
- 2002-2008: Member of Parliament, Rajyasabha
- 2004: Chief whip, Rajyasabha
- 2004-2008: Union minister of state in the Ministry of Personnel, Public Grievances, Pension and Ministry of Parliamentary Affairs
- 2008-2011: President of MP congress
