= Jitu Patwari =

Indian politician

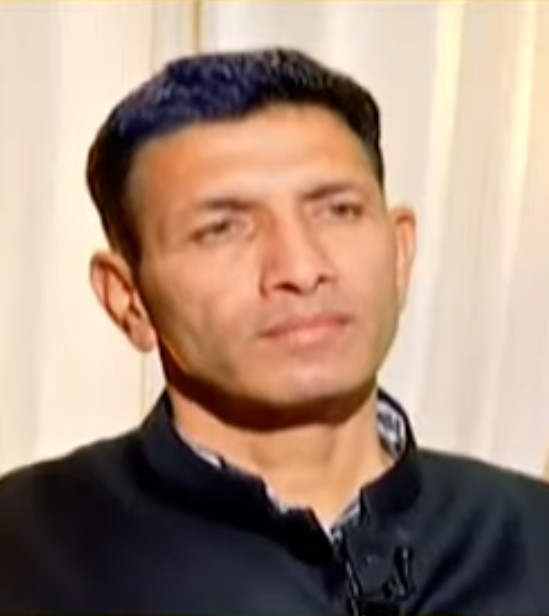

President Madhya Pradesh Congress Committee
- Incumbent
- Assumed office 16 December 2023
- Preceded by: Kamal Nath

Working President of Madhya Pradesh Congress Committee
- In office 2018–2023

Minister of Higher Education and Youth & Sports Affairs Government of Madhya Pradesh
- In office December 2018 – March 2020
- Chief Minister: Kamal Nath
- Preceded by: Jaibhan Singh Pawaiya, BJP; Yashodhara Raje, BJP
- Succeeded by: Mohan Yadav, BJP; Yashodhara Raje, BJP

Member of the Madhya Pradesh Legislative Assembly
- In office 11 December 2018 – 2 December 2023
- Chief Minister: Kamal Nath
- Speaker: Narmada Prasad Prajapati
- Succeeded by: Madhu Verma
- Constituency: Rau
- In office 8 December 2013 – 11 December 2018
- Chief Minister: Shivraj Singh Chouhan
- Speaker: Dr. Sitasharan Sharma
- Preceded by: Jitu Jirati, BJP
- Constituency: Rau

Personal details
- Born: 19 November 1973 (age 52) Bijalpur, Madhya Pradesh, India
- Citizenship: India
- Party: Indian National Congress
- Spouse: Renuka Patwari
- Education: L.L.B. (Honors) in 1997, B.A. from Devi Ahilya University in 1994.
- Alma mater: Devi Ahilya Vishwavidyalaya Government Multi Malhar Ashram Higher Secondary School, Indore
- Profession: Activist; Politician

Jitendra Patwari (born 19 November 1973) is an Indian politician from the Indian National Congress. He was the Cabinet Minister for Higher Education, Sports and Youth Affairs in the state of Madhya Pradesh. He is the current president of Madhya Pradesh Congress.

He was the Member of the Legislative Assembly from Rau Vidhan Sabha in Madhya Pradesh.

== Early life and education ==
He was born in Bijalpur, a small town near Indore, on 19 November 1973, to Ramesh Chandra Kodarlal Patwari and Pirak Bai Patwari. He has completed his schooling from Government Multi Malhar Ashram Higher Secondary School, Indore and then pursued his B.A. and L.L.B. degrees from Devi Ahilya Vishwavidyalaya Indore.

His grandfather Kodarlal Patwari served as a freedom fighter during the Indian independence movement. His father, Ramesh Chandra Patwari, is also an active leader of Indian National Congress.

== Political career ==
He first became MLA in 2013 from Rau Vidhan Sabha. He is currently the Secretary of All India Congress Committee and is in charge of Gujarat Pradesh Congress Committee. He is also the President of the Madhya Pradesh Congress Committee as well as national media panelist of Indian National Congress. Earlier he was President of Madhya Pradesh Youth Congress.

He won election for the second time from Rau in 2018. He won his first election against Jitu Jirati (BJP) in 2013.

He was the Cabinet Minister of Higher Education, Youth and Sports Affairs in the Government of Madhya Pradesh, after Indian National Congress formed the government in Madhya Pradesh. Resigned 15 months later after 2020 Madhya Pradesh political turmoil effected by Jyotiraditya Scindia joining BJP with 22 MLAs. In December 2023 he was appointed the President of Madhya Pradesh Congress Committee.

== See also ==
- Madhya Pradesh Legislative Assembly
- 2013 Madhya Pradesh Legislative Assembly election
- 2008 Madhya Pradesh Legislative Assembly election
