= Mohan Singh Rathore =

Indian politician (born 1955)

Mohan Singh Rathore (born 1955) is an Indian politician from Madhya Pradesh. He is an MLA from Bhitarwar Assembly constituency in Gwalior District. He won the 2023 Madhya Pradesh Legislative Assembly election, representing the Bharatiya Janata Party.

== Early life and education ==
Rathore is from Bhitarwar, Gwalior District, Madhya Pradesh. He is the son of late Ulfat Singh Rathore. He passed Class 12 and later while doing his second year graduation, at a college affiliated with Jivaji University, Gwalior, he discontinued his studies from 1973.

== Career ==
Rathore won from Bhitarwar Assembly constituency in the 2023 Madhya Pradesh Legislative Assembly election representing the Bharatiya Janata Party. He polled 97,700 votes and defeated his nearest rival and sitting MLA, Lakhan Singh Yadav of the Indian National Congress, by a margin of 22,354 votes.
