= Suresh Dhakad =

Indian politician

Member of Madhya Pradesh Legislative Assembly
- In office 2018–2023
- Succeeded by: Kailash Kushwaha
- Constituency: Pohari

Personal details
- Born: village Ranthkheda
- Party: Bharatiya Janata Party
- Other political affiliations: Indian National Congress
- Profession: agricultural

Suresh Rathkedha Dhakad is an Indian politician. He was elected to the Madhya Pradesh Legislative Assembly from Pohari. He was an elected member of the Madhya Pradesh Legislative Assembly as a member of the Indian National Congress. During 2020 Madhya Pradesh political crisis, he supported senior Congress leader Jyotiraditya Scindia and was one of the 22 MLAs who resigned and later joined Bharatiya Janata Party. He was re-elected to state Legislative Assembly of Madhya Pradesh in 2020 state Assembly by election by winning 22654 votes beating Kailash Kushwah of BSP.
