= Munnalal Goyal =

Indian politician

Member of Madhya Pradesh Legislative Assembly
- In office 2018–2020
- Preceded by: Maya Singh
- Succeeded by: Dr. Satish Sikarwar
- Constituency: Gwalior East

Personal details
- Born: Munnalal Goyal
- Party: Bharatiya Janata Party
- Other political affiliations: Indian National Congress
- Source: [family- taniya mittal, dauter]

Munnalal Goyal is an Indian politician. He was elected to the Madhya Pradesh Legislative Assembly from Gwalior East. He was an elected member of the Madhya Pradesh Legislative Assembly as a member of the Indian National Congress. During 2020 Madhya Pradesh political crisis, he supported senior Congress leader Jyotiraditya Scindia and was one of the 22 MLAs who resigned and later joined Bharatiya Janata Party.
