= Ram Awtar Sharma =

Indian politician (1908–1987)

Member of Parliament, Lok Sabha
- In office 1967–1971
- Preceded by: Vijaya Raje Scindia
- Succeeded by: Atal Bihari Vajpayee
- Constituency: Gwalior

Personal details
- Born: 26 July 1908
- Died: 29 October 1987 (aged 79)
- Party: Bharatiya Jana Sangh
- Spouse: Bhagwan Devi

Ram Awtar Sharma (1908–1987) was an Indian politician. He was elected to the Lok Sabha, the lower house of the Parliament of India, from Gwalior in Madhya Pradesh, as a member of the Bharatiya Jana Sangh.

Sharma died at Gwalior on 29 October 1987 at the age of 79 years.
