= Gwalior East Assembly constituency =

Constituency of the Madhya Pradesh legislative assembly in India

Coordinates: 26.23°N 78.22°E

Gwalior East
- Constituency No. 16 for the Madhya Pradesh Legislative Assembly

Constituency details
- Country: India
- Region: Central India
- State: Madhya Pradesh
- District: Gwalior
- Lok Sabha constituency: Gwalior
- Established: 2008
- Reservation: None

Member of Legislative Assembly
- 16th Madhya Pradesh Legislative Assembly
- Incumbent Satish Sikarwar
- Party: Indian National Congress
- Elected year: 2023
- Preceded by: Munnalal Goyal

Gwalior East Assembly constituency is one of the 230 Vidhan Sabha (Legislative Assembly) constituencies of Madhya Pradesh state in central India. This constituency came into existence in 2008, following the delimitation of the legislative assembly constituencies.

== Overview ==
Gwalior East (constituency number 16) is one of the 6 Vidhan Sabha constituencies located in Gwalior district. This constituency covers the ward numbers 19 to 29 and 37 to 41 of the Gwalior Municipal Corporation.

Gwalior East is part of Gwalior Lok Sabha constituency along with seven other Vidhan Sabha segments, namely, Gwalior, Gwalior South, Gwalior Rural, Bhitarwar and Dabra in this district and Karera and Pohari in Shivpuri district.

== Members of Legislative Assembly ==
Election	Name	Party
2008	Anup Mishra	Bharatiya Janata Party
2013	Maya Singh	Bharatiya Janata Party
2018	Munnalal Goyal	Indian National Congress
2020 (Note: by-election)	Satish Sikarwar	Indian National Congress
2023	Satish Sikarwar	Indian National Congress

== Election results ==
=== 2023 ===
2023 Madhya Pradesh Legislative Assembly election: Gwalior East
Party	Candidate	Votes	%	±%
INC	Satish Sikarwar	100,301	51.83	+2.14
BJP	Maya Singh	84,948	43.89	−0.16
BSP	Prahlad Singh Prakash Tailar	4,226	2.18	−1.56
NOTA	None of the above	1,324	0.68	−0.50
Majority		15,353	7.94	+2.30
Turnout		193,530	58.36	+10.14
INC hold		Swing		

=== 2020 bypolls ===
2020 Madhya Pradesh Legislative Assembly by-elections: Gwalior East
Party	Candidate	Votes	%	±%
INC	Satish Sikarwar	75,342	49.69	−2.23
BJP	Munnalal Goyal	66,787	44.05	+2.40
BSP	Mahesh Baghel	5,672	3.74	+0.60
NOTA	None of the above	1785	1.18	+0.10
Majority		8,555	5.64	−4.63
Turnout		151,631	48.22	−9.79
INC hold		Swing		

=== 2018 ===
2018 Madhya Pradesh Legislative Assembly election: Gwalior East
Party	Candidate	Votes	%	±%
INC	Munnalal Goyal	90,133	51.92	
BJP	Satish Sikarwar	72,314	41.65	
BSP	Bhury Singh	5,446	3.14	
NOTA	None of the above	1,873	1.08	
Majority		17,819	10.27	
Turnout		173,608	58.01	
INC gain from BJP		Swing		

== See also ==
- Gwalior
