= Jaibhan Singh Pawaiya =

Indian politician

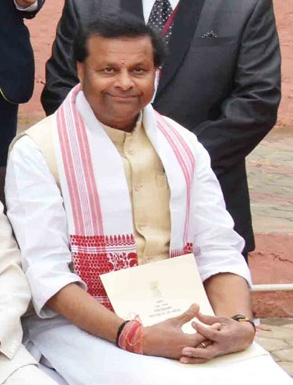

Minister of Higher Education, Government of Madhya Pradesh
- In office June 2016 – December 2018
- Succeeded by: Jitu Patwari

Member of Legislative Assembly from Madhya Pradesh
- In office 2013 – December 2018
- Succeeded by: Pradhuman Singh Tomar
- Constituency: Gwalior

Member of Parliament In Lok Sabha
- In office 1999–2004
- Succeeded by: Ramsevak Singh
- Constituency: Gwalior

Personal details
- Born: Gwalior, Madhya Pradesh
- Party: Bhartiya Janta Party
- Children: 2 daughters
- As of August, 2019

Jaibhan Singh Pawaiya is an Indian politician and a leader of the Bharatiya Janata Party (BJP). He is currently the Seh-Prabhari of BJP in Maharashtra state. He previously served as the Cabinet Minister of Higher Education in the cabinet of CM Shivraj Singh Chouhan Government. He was a member of Lok Sabha in 1999 from Gwalior. He won 2013 Madhya Pradesh Assembly election from Gwalior against Pradhuman Singh Tomar of Congress, but lost the 2018 Assembly election against Pradhuman Singh from the same constituency.

== Political career ==
Jaibhan became RSS swayamsevak in year 1973. He took part in Sampurna kranti Andolan of Shri Jaiprakash Narayan (JP Movement) in 1974. During period of 1973 to 1982 Shri Pawaiya worked as City President, Member of National Executive Committee with Akhil Bharatiya Vidyarthi Parishad (AVBP), the student wing of RSS. He was assigned by RSS to Vishva Hindu Parishad (VHP) in 1983 as Joint secretary of Madhya Pradesh. He was National General Secretary of Bajrang Dal, an Indian Hindutva militant organisation, in 1993 and became second National President of Bajrang Dal from 1995. Shri Pawaiya stoutly defended the Vishva Hindu Parishad (VHP) and the Bajrang Dal in the March 2002 Ramjanmabhoomi campaign, when all BJP leaders were disassociating themselves from the VHP. He defied all party and government orders and went to Ayodhya in March 2002. He was imprisoned for 13 days during Ramjanmabhoomi Andolan with Shri L. K. Advani (Lal Krishna Advani) and Dr. Murli Manohar Joshi. He was elected member of 13th Lok Sabha in 1999. Shri Pawaiya also served as Vice President of State 20 Point Programme Implementation Committee (Minister status). In year 2013, he was elected as MLA after winning Legislative Assembly elections in Gwalior(15) with 74769 Votes and became a member of Vidhan Sabha for the first time. Shri Jaibhan Singh Pawaiya was inducted as Cabinet Minister on 30 June 2016 in the cabinet of Chief Minister Shri Shivraj Singh Chouhan holding portfolio as Minister for Higher Education.

== Early life and education ==
Shri Pawaiya was born 6 July 1955 in the jamindar family of Chinaur garhi his father Shri Balwant Singh Pawaiya resident of Chinaur village of Gwalior district of Madhya Pradesh belonging to Hindu Rajput family. His qualification was Diploma Civil Engineer. He is an agriculturist by profession. He was married to Smt Maya Singh Pawaiya and they have two daughters.
