= Madhya Pradesh Congress Committee =

- President: Jitu Patwari
- Chairman: Umang Singhar (Leader of Opposition)
- Headquarters: Indira Bhawan, Link Road No.1, Shivaji Nagar, Bhopal-462016, Madhya Pradesh
- Youth wing: Madhya Pradesh Youth Congress
- Women's wing: Madhya Pradesh Mahila Congress
- Labour wing: Unorganised Workers' and Employees Congress
- Ideology: Social democracy
- Political position: Centre
- ECI status: A State Unit of Indian National Congress
- Alliance: Indian National Developmental Inclusive Alliance
- Seats in Rajya Sabha: 2 / 11
- Seats in Lok Sabha: 0 / 29
- Seats in Madhya Pradesh Legislative Assembly: 64 / 230

Website
- https://mpcongress.org/

Madhya Pradesh Congress Committee (Madhya Pradesh CC) is the Pradesh Congress Committee (state wing) of the Indian National Congress (INC) serving in the Indian state of Madhya Pradesh. It is responsible for organizing and coordinating the party's activities and campaigns within the state, as well as selecting candidates for local, state, and national elections. The incumbent president of the MPCC is Jitu Patwari.

== OFFICE (officials) ==
Sl no.	Incharge	Name	Designation
1	Madhya Pradesh Congress Committee	Jitu Patwari	President
2	Madhya Pradesh Congress Committee	Jaivardhan Singh	Vice President
3	Madhya Pradesh Congress Committee	Vacant	Working President
4	Madhya Pradesh Congress Committee	Bala Bachchan	Working President
5	Madhya Pradesh Congress Committee (F)	Dwarika Prasad Dubey (Nausa)	Chief General Secretary
6	Madhya Pradesh Congress Committee	Ashok Singh	Treasurer
7	Media Department	Mukesh Nayak	Chairman
8	NSUI Madhya Pradesh	Aashutosh Chouksey	President
9	Sevadal	Avanish Bhargav	President
10	Madhya Pradesh Mahila Congress	Reena Bourasi	President
11	Madhya Pradesh Youth Congress	Yash Ghanghoria	President
12	Madhya Pradesh Congress Committee	Surender Choudhary	Working President

== Madhya Pradesh Legislative Assembly election ==
Year	Party leader	Seats won	Change in seats	Outcome
1952	Ravishankar Shukla	194 / 232	New	Government
1957	Kailash Nath Katju	232 / 288	▲38	Government
1962	Dwarka Prasad Mishra	142 / 288	▼90	Government
1967	Dwarka Prasad Mishra	167 / 296	▲25	Opposition later Government
1972	Prakash Chandra Sethi	220 / 296	▲53	Government
1977	Shyama Charan Shukla	84 / 320	▼136	Opposition
1980	Arjun Singh	246 / 320	▲162	Government
1985	Arjun Singh	250 / 320	▲4	Government
1990	Shyama Charan Shukla	56 / 320	▼194	Opposition
1993	Digvijay Singh	174 / 320	▲118	Government
1998	Digvijay Singh	172 / 320	▼2	Government
2003	Digvijay Singh	38 / 230	▼86	Opposition
2008	Suresh Pachouri	71 / 230	▲33	Opposition
2013	Vivek Tankha	58 / 230	▼13	Opposition
2018	Kamal Nath	114 / 230	▲56	Government later Opposition
2023	Kamal Nath	66 / 230	▼48	Opposition

Madhya Pradesh Congress Legislative Assembly seat count

== List of state presidents ==
S. No.	Photo	Name	Took office	Left office
1		Radhakishan Malviya	1998	2003
2		Subhash Yadav	2003	2008
3		Suresh Pachouri	2008	2011
4		Kantilal Bhuria	2011	2014
5		Arun Yadav	2014	2018
6		Kamal Nath	2018	2023
7		Jitu Patwari	2023	Incumbent

== List of chief ministers ==
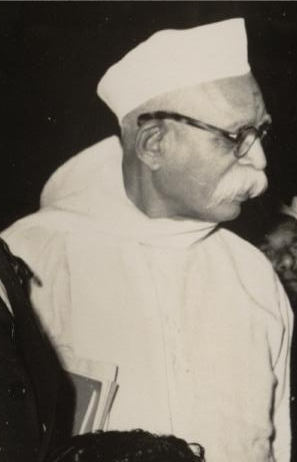
Ravishankar Shukla

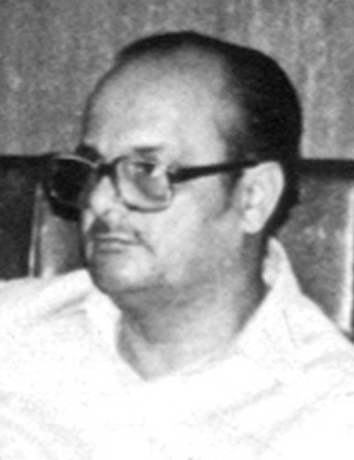
Arjun Singh

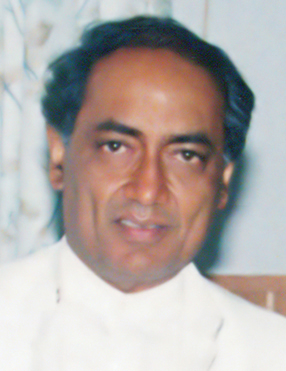
Digvijaya Singh

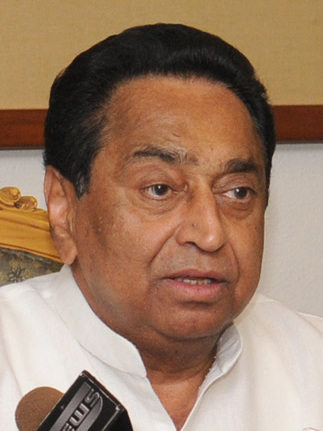
Kamal Nath

S. No.	Name	Term of office		Party (Note: This column only names the chief minister's party. The state government he heads may be a complex coalition of several parties and independents; these are not listed here.)	Days in office
1	Ravishankar Shukla; MLA for Saraipali	1 November 1956	31 December 1956	Indian National Congress	61 days
2	Bhagwantrao Mandloi; MLA for Khandwa	1 January 1957	30 January 1957	Indian National Congress	30 days
3	Kailash Nath Katju; MLA for Jaora	31 January 1957	14 March 1957	Indian National Congress	43 days
3	Kailash Nath Katju; MLA for Jaora	14 March 1957	11 March 1962	Indian National Congress	1824 days
4	Bhagwantrao Mandloi; MLA for Khandwa	12 March 1962	29 September 1963	Indian National Congress	567 days
5	Dwarka Prasad Mishra; MLA for katangi	30 September 1963	8 March 1967	Indian National Congress	1256 days
5	Dwarka Prasad Mishra; MLA for katangi	9 March 1967	29 July 1967	Indian National Congress	113 days
6	Nareshchandra Singh; MLA for Pussore	13 March 1969	25 March 1969	Indian National Congress	13 days
7	Shyama Charan Shukla; MLA for Rajim	26 March 1969	28 January 1972	Indian National Congress	1039 days
8	Prakash Chandra Sethi; MLA for Ujjain Uttar	29 January 1972	22 March 1972	Indian National Congress	54 days
8	Prakash Chandra Sethi; MLA for Ujjain Uttar	23 March 1972	22 December 1975	Indian National Congress	1370 days
9	Shyama Charan Shukla [2] MLA for Rajim	23 December 1975	29 April 1977	Indian National Congress	494 days
10	Arjun Singh; MLA for Churhat	8 June 1980	10 March 1985	Indian National Congress	1737 days
10	Arjun Singh; MLA for Churhat	11 March 1985	12 March 1985	Indian National Congress	2 days
11	Motilal Vora; MLA for Durg	13 March 1985	13 February 1988	Indian National Congress	1068 days
12	Arjun Singh [2] MLA for Churhat	14 February 1988	24 January 1989	Indian National Congress	346 days
13	Motilal Vora [2] MLA for Durg	25 January 1989	8 December 1989	Indian National Congress	318 days
14	Shyama Charan Shukla [3]	9 December 1989	4 March 1990	Indian National Congress	86 days
15	Digvijaya Singh; MLA for Raghogarh	7 December 1993	1 December 1998	Indian National Congress	1821 days
15	Digvijaya Singh; MLA for Raghogarh	1 December 1998	8 December 2003	Indian National Congress	1834 days
16	Kamal Nath; MLA for Chhindwara	17 December 2018	23 March 2020	Indian National Congress	463 days

== Electoral performance ==
=== General Elections ===
Lok Sabha Elections
Year	Lok Sabha	Seats contested	Seats won	Change in seats	% of votes	Vote swing	Popular vote	Outcome
1951	1st	29	27 / 29	▲27	51.63%	New	37,13,537	Government
1957	2nd	36	35 / 36	▲8	52.10%	▲0.47	39,67,199	Government
1962	3rd	35	24 / 36	▼11	39.55%	▼12.55	26,51,882	Government
1967	4th	37	24 / 37	Steady	40.78%	▲1.23	37,74,364	Government
1971	5th	36	21 / 37	▼3	45.60%	▲4.82	40,27,658	Government
1977	6th	38	1 / 40	▼20	32.47%	▼13.13	38,35,807	Opposition
1980	7th	39	35 / 40	▲34	47.20%	▲14.73	59,49,859	Government
1984	8th	40	40 / 40	▲5	57.08%	▲9.88	88,98,835	Government
1989	9th	40	8 / 40	▼32	37.72%	▼19.36	74,20,935	Opposition
1991	10th	40	27 / 40	▲19	45.34%	▲7.62	74,25,644	Government
1996	11th	40	8 / 40	▼19	31.02%	▼14.32	71,11,753	Opposition
1998	12th	40	10 / 40	▲2	39.40%	▲8.38	1,06,11,317	Opposition
1999	13th	40	11 / 40	▲1	43.91%	▲4.51	1,11,35,161	Opposition
2004	14th	29	4 / 29	▼7	34.07%	▼9.84	62,89,013	Government
2009	15th	28	12 / 29	▲8	40.14%	▲6.07	78,20,333	Government
2014	16th	29	2 / 29	▼10	35.35%	▼4.79	1,03,40,274	Opposition
2019	17th	29	1 / 29	▼1	34.82%	▼0.53	1,27,33,074	Opposition
2024	18th	28	0 / 29	▼1	32.90%	▼1.92	1,23,08,049	Opposition

== Factions ==
Madhya Pradesh Vikas Congress was a faction in the Congress Party from 1996 to 1998. MPVC was founded by former aviation minister Madhavrao Scindia, after he was refused an INC ticket for the 1996 Lok Sabha elections.

Scindia won a seat as an MPVC candidate as a result of hard work & strong campaign led by his workers & followers who had also resigned from INC. In 1998 MPVC merged into Indian National Congress.

== List of Disrict Congress Committee- Presidents ==
S.No	DCC	President
1	Agar-Malwa	Vijaylaxmi Tanwar
2	Alirajpur	Mukesh Patel
3	Anuppur	Shyam Kumar Guddu
4	Ashok Nagar(city & Rural	Rajendra Kushwaha
5	Balaghat	Sanjay Uikey
6	Barwani	Shri Nanesh Coudhary
7	Betul	Shri Nilay Vinod Daga
8	Bhind Rural	Ramshish Baghel
9	Bhind City	Darmendra Bhadoriya
10	Bhopal City	Praveen Saxena
11	Bhopal Rural	Anokhi Man Singh Patel
12	Burhanpur City	Harsh Tank Rinku
13	Burhanpur Rural	Ravinder Mahajan
14	Chhatarpur	Gagan Yadav
15	Chhindwara	Vishwanath Okhte
16	Damoh	Manak Patel
17	Datia	Ashok Dangi
18	Dewas City	Prayas Gautam
19	Dewas Rural	Manish Choudhary
20	Dhar	Swatantra Joshi
21	Dindori	Omkar Sing Markam
22	Guna	Jaivardhan Singh
23	Gwalior City	Surendra Yadav
24	Gwalior Rural	Prabhudayal Johare
25	Harda	Mohan Sai
26	Indore City	Chintu Chouksey
27	Indore Rural	Vipin Wankhede
28	Jabalpur City	Sourabh Nati Sharma
29	Jabalpur Rural	Sanjay Yadav
30	Jhabua	Prakash Ranka
31	Katni City	Amit Kumar Shukla
32	Katni Rural	Kuwar Sourabh Singh
33	Khandwa City	Pratibha Raghuvanshi
34	Khandwa Rural	Uttan Pal Singh Purni
35	Khargone	Ravi Naik
36	Maihar	Dharmesh Ghai
37	Mandla	Dr. Ashok Markole
38	Mandsaur	Mahendra Singh Gurjar
39	Mauganj	Hiralal Kol
40	Morena City	Gajendra Jatav
41	Morena Rural	Madhuraj Tomar
42	Narmadapuram	Shivakant Pandey
43	Narsinghpur	Sunita Patel
44	Neemuch	Tarun Baheti
45	Niwadi	Rajesh Yadav
46	Pandurna	Jatan Uikey
47	Panna	Anis Khan
48	Raisen	Devendra Patel
49	Rajgarh	Priyavrat Singh
50	Ratlam City	Shantilal Verma
51	Ratlam Rural	Harshvijay Gehlot
52	Rewa City	Ashok Patel
53	Rewa Rural	Rajinder Sharma
54	Sagar City	Mahesh Jatav
55	Sagar Rural	Bhupendra Singh Mohasa
56	Satna City	Arif Iqbal siddique
57	Satna Rural	Siddharth Kushwaha
58	Sehore	Rajiv Gujarati
59	Seoni	Naresh Marawai
60	Shahdol	Ajay Awasti
61	Shajapur	Nareshwar Pratap Singh
62	Sheopur	Mangilal Bhairwa Fauji
63	Shivpuri	Mohit Agrawal
64	Sidhi	Gyan Pratap Singh
65	Singhrauli City	Praveen Singh Chauhan
66	Singhrauli Rural	Saraswati Singh Markam
67	Tikamgarh	Naveen Sahu
68	Ujjain City	Mukesh Bhati
69	Ujjain Rural	Mahesh Parmar
70	Umaria	Engineer Vijay Kumar Kol
71	Vidisha	Mohit Raghuvanshi

Dwarika Prasad Dubey (Nausa) is a senior Congress leader from Sidhi district, Madhya Pradesh, and serves as a General Secretary of the Madhya Pradesh Congress Committee (MPCC). He has been active in the politics of the Vindhya region for over four decades. His political activities are primarily associated with Sidhi. He has also held various governmental positions and the Congress organizational posts of Sidhi.

== See also ==
- Indian National Congress
- Congress Working Committee
- All India Congress Committee
- Pradesh Congress Committee
- Madhya Pradesh Youth Congress
