= Bhitarwar Assembly constituency =

Constituency of the Madhya Pradesh legislative assembly in India

Coordinates: 25.79°N 78.12°E

Bhitarwar
- Constituency No. 18 for the Madhya Pradesh Legislative Assembly

Constituency details
- Country: India
- Region: Central India
- State: Madhya Pradesh
- District: Gwalior
- Lok Sabha constituency: Gwalior
- Established: 2008
- Reservation: None

Member of Legislative Assembly
- 16th Madhya Pradesh Legislative Assembly
- Incumbent Mohan Singh Rathore
- Party: Bharatiya Janata Party
- Elected year: 2023
- Preceded by: Lakhan Singh Yadav

Bhitarwar Assembly constituency is one of the 230 Vidhan Sabha (Legislative Assembly) constituencies of Madhya Pradesh state in central India. This constituency came into existence in 2008, following the delimitation of the assembly constituencies. This constituency covers parts of the erstwhile Gird and Dabra constituencies.

== Overview ==
Bhitarwar (constituency number 18) is one of the 6 Vidhan Sabha constituencies located in Gwalior district. This constituency covers the entire Bhitarwar tehsil and part of Gwalior tehsil of the district.

Bhitarwar is part of Gwalior Lok Sabha constituency along with seven other Vidhan Sabha segments, namely, Gwalior, Gwalior East, Gwalior South, Gwalior Rural and Dabra in this district and Karera and Pohari in Shivpuri district.

== Members of Legislative Assembly ==
Madhya Pradesh Legislative Assembly
Year	Name	Party
Established in 2008
2008	Lakhan Singh Yadav	Indian National Congress
2013	Lakhan Singh Yadav	Indian National Congress
2018	Lakhan Singh Yadav	Indian National Congress
2023	Mohan Singh Rathore	Bharatiya Janata Party

== Election results ==
=== 2023 ===
2023 Madhya Pradesh Legislative Assembly election: Bhitarwar
Party	Candidate	Votes	%	±%
BJP	Mohan Singh Rathore	97,000	53.05	+18.26
INC	Lakhan Singh Yadav	74,646	40.82	−1.75
BSP	Kalicharan (Pappu Gurjar)	3,792	2.07	−9.93
NOTA	None of the above	1,032	0.56	−0.29
Majority		22,354	12.23	+4.45
Turnout		182,852	75.26	+3.8
BJP gain from INC		Swing		

=== 2018 ===
2018 Madhya Pradesh Legislative Assembly election: Bhitarwar
Party	Candidate	Votes	%	±%
INC	Lakhan Singh Yadav	66,439	42.57	
BJP	Anoop Mishra	54,309	34.79	
BSP	Vishvjit Beenu Patel	18,728	12.0	
Independent	Raghvendra Singh Tomar	9,154	5.86	
NOTA	None of the above	1,325	0.85	
Majority		12,130	7.78	
Turnout		156,087	71.46	
INC hold		Swing		

=== 2013 ===
M. P. Legislative Assembly Election, 2013: Bhitarwar
Party	Candidate	Votes	%	±%
INC	Lakhan Singh Yadav	40,578	28.89	
BJP	Anoop Mishra	34030	24.23	
BSP	Ram Niwas Singh Gurjar	24556	17.48	
BA S D	Jawahar Singh Rawat	17000	12.10	
RSMD	Brijendra Tiwari	14578	10.38	
Independent	Sitav Kha	1272	0.91	N/A
NOTA	None of the Above	983	0.70	
Majority				
Turnout		140470	70.02	
INC hold		Swing		

== See also ==
- Bhitarwar
