= Jitu Jirati =

Indian politician

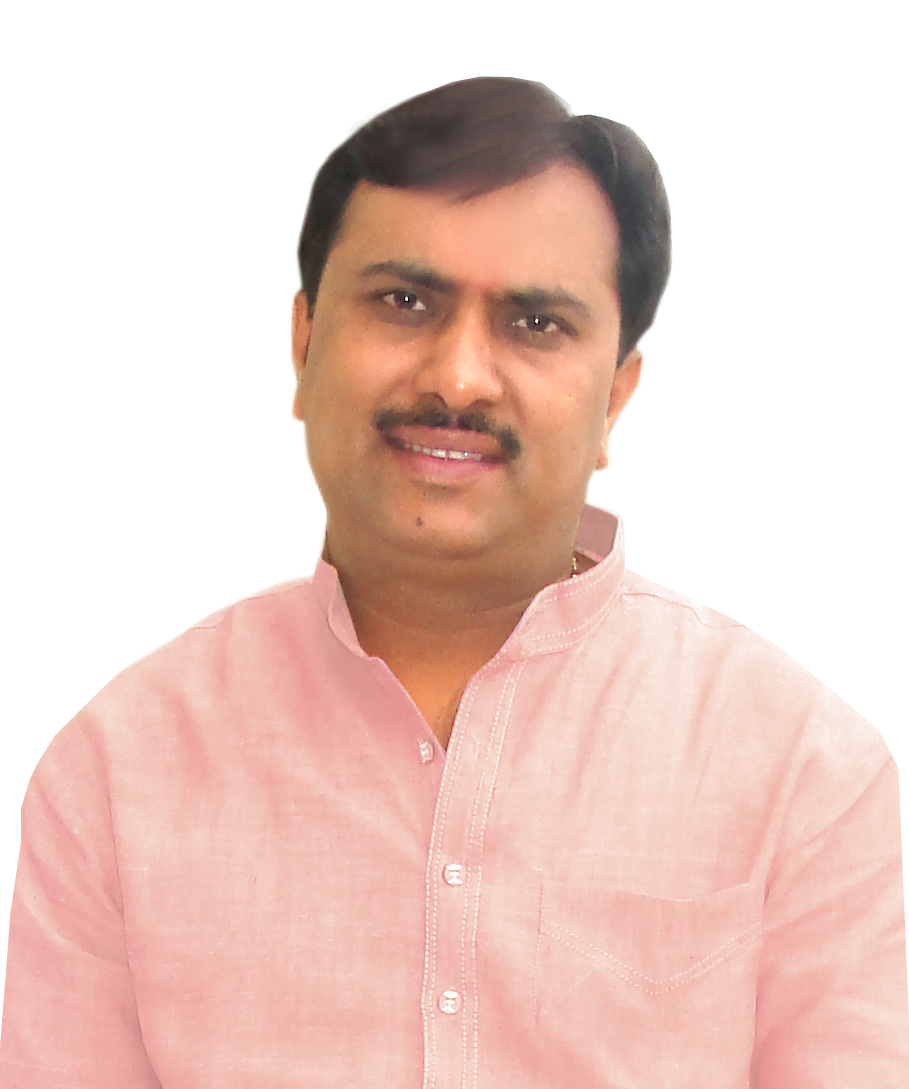
- Jitu Jirati in 2013

Member of Legislative Assembly from Madhya Pradesh
- In office 2008–2013
- Succeeded by: Jitu Patwari
- Constituency: Rau

Vice President of Bharatiya Janata Party, Madhya Pradesh
- In office Present

Personal details
- Born: 8 August 1976 (age 49) Indore, Madhya Pradesh, India
- Party: Bharatiya Janata Party
- Website: jitujirati.com

Jitu Jirati (Jitendra) (born 8 August 1976) is an Indian politician and member of Bhartiya Janta Party. From 2008 to 2013, he was the Member of Legislative Assembly representing the Rau constituency in Madhya Pradesh. He is also a former President of Bharatiya Janata Yuva Morcha in Madhya Pradesh. In present-day he is serving as the vice-president of M.P. of Bhartiya Janta Party. His father's name is Ramesh Jirati and mother's name is Chandrakala Jirati.
