= Bijalpur =

- Suburb
- Location in Madhya Pradesh, India Bijalpur (India)
- Coordinates: 22°38′5″N 75°48′41″E
- Country: India
- State: Madhya Pradesh
- District: Indore District
- City: Indore

Government
  - Type: Municipal Corporation
  - Body: Indore Municipal Corporation (IMC)
  - Mayor: Malini Laxmansingh Gaur
  - District Collector: Manish Singh, IAS

Population (2011)
  - Total: 40,000

Languages
  - Official: Hindi
- Time zone: UTC+5:30 (IST)
- PIN: 452001
- Vehicle registration: MP-09
- Lok Sabha constituency: Indore
- Vidhan Sabha constituency: Rau
- Website: imcindore.mp.gov.in

Bijalpur is in the southwest region of Indore city in India. It has population of 40,000 (as per Census record 2011).

As of 2001 India census, Bijalpur had a population of 18,000. Males constitute 51% of the population and females 49%. Bijalpur has an average literacy rate of 83%, higher than the national average of 59.5%: male literacy is 89%, and female literacy is 74%. In Bijalpur, 16% of the population is under 6 years of age.

== History ==
Bijalpur is known for its natural environment and farming community. The Kabaddi team in Bijalpur has won many championships, and the city hosted the 1991 all India Kabaddi tournament.

== Geography ==
Bijalpur is situated at an altitude of about 530 m (1,740 ft) above mean sea level. Climate is sub tropical which is typical in this part of country. Summers are hot and dry followed by monsoon months, with approximate 32–35 in (810–890 mm) of rainfall followed by mild winters in the months of Dec-Jan. It has Government women polytechnic college situated on Bijalpur square. It also has schools and colleges attached to Devi Ahilya Vishwavidyalaya and RGPV in its vicinity. There is a water control flow room in Bijalpur.

== Politics ==
Bijalpur area falls under the Rau Assembly Constituency in Indore District. The current elected Member is Madhu verma from the BJP.

== Transport ==
Bijalpur is situated near the AB Road (NH 52) and has got a frequent connection of city buses from the main Bijalpur Square.

The nearest broad gauge railway station is Rajendra Nagar railway station. However, the main railway station of Indore, Indore Junction railway station is 10 kilometres (6.2 mi) away. Indore Jn is one of the major stations and has regular daily connections to almost all major cities in the country.

== Places of interest ==
Bijalpur Lake: Also houses the sewage treatment plant.
