= Rau =

- suburb
- Location in Madhya Pradesh, India
- Coordinates: 22°38′5″N 75°48′41″E
- Country: India
- State: Madhya Pradesh
- District: Indore

Government
  - Body: Indore Metropolitan Region

Population (2017)
  - Total: 40,055
  - Rank: 356
- Time zone: UTC+5:30 (IST)
- PIN: 452001
- Vehicle registration: MP-09
- Lok Sabha constituency: Indore
- Vidhan Sabha constituency: Rau
- Website: imcindore.mp.gov.in

Rau is a suburb of Indore city and a nagar panchayat in Indore district in the Indian state of Madhya Pradesh. It is a part of the Indore Metropolitan Region.

== Location ==
Rau is situated on NH52 (earlier NH3), Mumbai Agra Road (popularly known as A.B. Road) between Mhow & Rajendra Nagar, Indore area of Indore city near Rangwasa village.

== Outlook ==
The road connecting Pithampur, an industrial area of Indore region) to Indore Central, branches out from Rau, towards Pithampur from NH3.

== Geography ==
Rau is situated at an altitude of about 530 meters above Mean Sea Level. The climate is subtropical, which is typical in this part of the country. Summers are hot and dry followed by monsoon months, with approximately 32–35 inches of rainfall followed by mild winters in the months of December and January.

Summer daytime temperature can reach 45 °C with 20–25% humidity. Winter night temperature can fall to 5–6 °C with 20–25% humidity. Annual rainfall is about 32–35 inches (800 mm).

== Demographics ==
As of 2001 India census, Rau had a population of 20,845. Males constitute 51% of the population and females 49%. Rau has an average literacy rate of 63%, higher than the national average of 59.5%: male literacy is 72%, and female literacy is 54%. In Rau, 16% of the population is under 6 years of age.

== Connectivity ==
=== Road ===
Rau is situated on National Highway 52 (NH52) and has frequent intracity connection with Indore City–Mhow–Pithampur through an extensive network of city buses, both private and run by Atal Indore City Transport Services Limited.

=== Rail ===
Rau railway station is the nearest railway station which serves the area. It is situated on the Akola-Ratlam line. The passenger trains from Dr. Ambedkar Nagar towards Indore and Ratlam have stoppage at the station.

The major railway junction to board express trains is Indore Jn which is about 14 KMs away from the suburb.

=== Airport ===
The nearest airport is Devi Ahilyabai Holkar Airport in Indore.

== Administration ==
Rau comes under Indore Parliamentary constituency and is a separate seat known by the same name for State Assembly. The current MLA for Rau Constituency is Madhu Verma who defeated the Ex MLA Jitu Patwari.

It comes under jurisdiction of Indore Collector, an IAS officer and Senior Superintendent of Police, an IPS Officer.

There is a separate municipal corporation (Nagar Parishad) and the chairman is Mrs. Pappi Vijay Patidar.

There is also a police station which is situated on A.B. Road.

== Education and research ==
Rau hosts several higher education institutions, including engineering and management colleges affiliated with AICTE and UGC.

The State Institute of Hotel Management Indore is situated at Rau bypass and approximately 3 km from Rau circle. Indian Institute of Management Indore is situated in Rau. Rau also has many Engineering Colleges and Management Colleges attached to Devi Ahilya Vishwavidyalaya, Indore & Rajiv Gandhi Proudyogiki Vishwavidyalaya. Raja Ramanna Centre for Advanced Technology, dealing with research in Laser & Nuclear science is also in Rau. Indore Professional Studies (IPS) Academy is situated in Rau. Emerald Heights International School, St. Norberts, LG Academy, New oxford public Hr. Sec. School and Prerna Bal Niketan are the major schools situated here. Many engineering colleges are there in and around Rau Area viz. Medi-Caps Group of Institutions, Sanghvi Institute of Management and Science, Indore Institute of Science of Technology, S D Bansal College, IPS academy. These colleges collectively educate more than 10,000 students. Rau also has a Government college situated in Gurukul Pasrisar, Rangwasa Road. The Govt. College Rau was established in 2011 and has B.A. B.Com. and B.Sc. courses. Rau has several units of industries. It is the hub of several trolley and agricultural implements manufacturers. Companies like Shakti pumps and Oriental chemicals also have their roots in Rau.

== Specialties ==
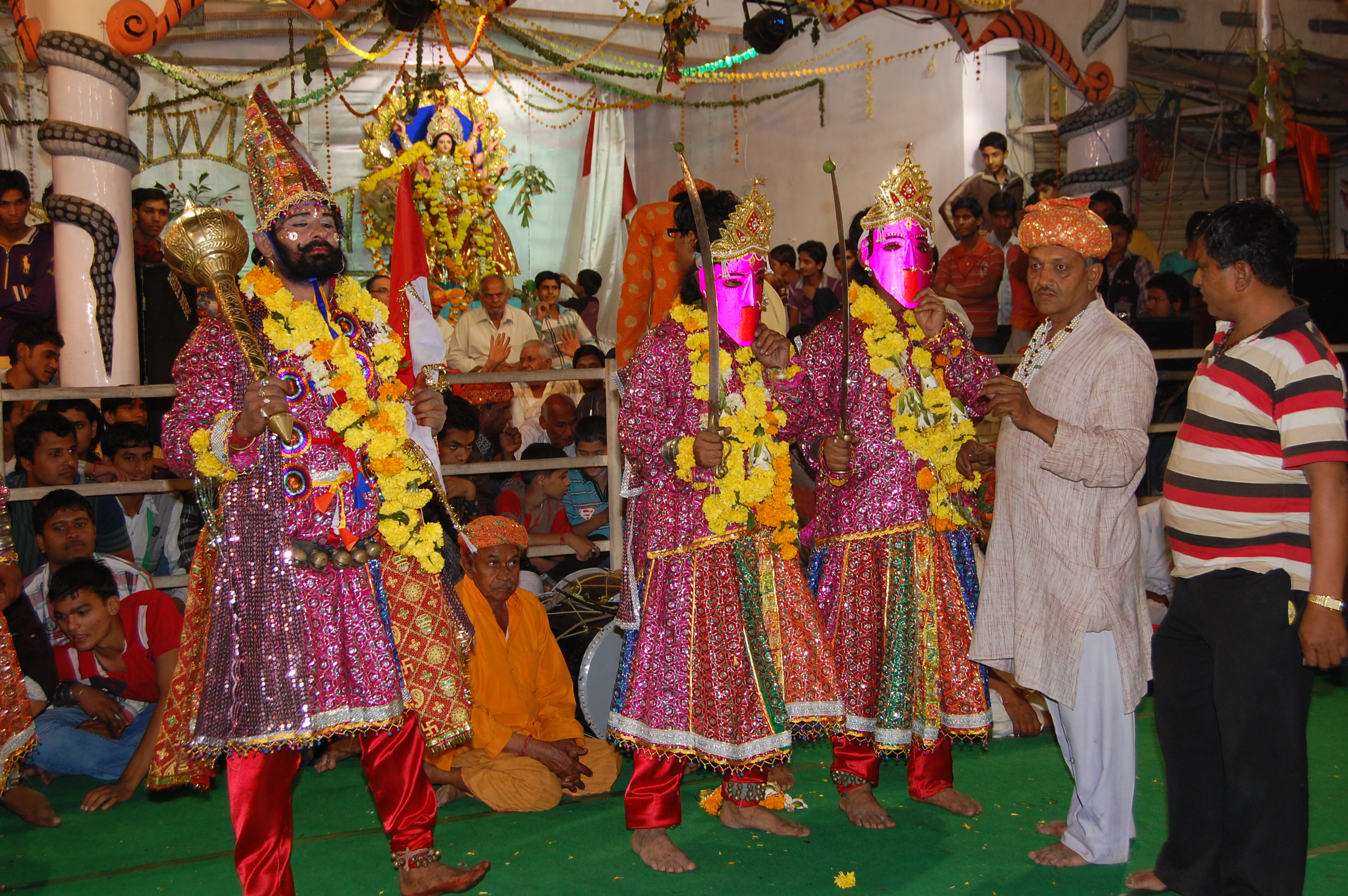
Chausath Maharani Ki Sawari

The famous Umiya Dham temple is a popular location of Rau. Rau is also famous for the Dusherra Vijayadashami festival celebrated on the tenth day of the month of Ashwin, according to the Hindu lunisolar calendar, which corresponds to September or October of the Gregorian calendar. The first nine days are celebrated as Maha Navratri (Devnagari: नवरात्रि, 'nine nights') or Sharada Navratri (the most important Navratri) and culminates on the tenth day as Dusehhra. In Navratri the last two days i.e. Mahaashtami and Mahanavmi are also remarkable because of the traditional Mata ki Sawari in which people use to worship the Goddess Amba - Durga and Chousath Jogini Kalika Maharani with Bairav Baba.

== See also ==
- Mhow
- Rau (Vidhan Sabha constituency)
