= Rangwasa =

Rangwasa Rangwasa (Rau)
- village
- Location in Madhya Pradesh, India
- Coordinates: 22.6418605°N 75.789332°E
- Country: India
- State: Madhya Pradesh
- District: Indore District
- Talukas: Indore

Population
  - Total: 8,632 (in year 2,011)

Languages
  - Official: Hindi
- Time zone: UTC+5:30 (IST)
- PIN: 453331
- Nearest city: Indore
- Lok Sabha constituency: Indore
- Vidhan Sabha constituency: Rau

Rangwasa is a village near Rau, in Indore District, Madhya Pradesh, India. The village is situated on Rau Navda Road. The city of Indore is around 8 km away from the village, and Rau is 2 km away. The Raja Ramanna Centre for Advanced Technology (CAT) is attached to the village. Rangwasa farmers produce crops of potato, onion and soybean in a year. Three famous temples 'Umiya Dham', 'Surya Mandir' and 'Baba Bhoothnath Temple' are located near to this village.

Rangwasa hosts a mela (fair) celebrating the garba, a traditional dance form performed during Navratri. This celebration is done by the Rodwal Brahmin families, that settled here in the early 18th century on the Invite of the Holkar State.

== Geography ==
Rangwasa got its name from the settlement of the Rodwal families here, who were specially invited by the Holkar Dynasty during the 18th Century, and were alloted the right of 'Pateli' here. There are 1000s of the Rodwal descendants living here. Initially, this place was known as Rodwasa, attributing to the Rodwal Brahmins living here, which with time became Randwasa and eventually Rangwasa.

Rangwasa is situated at an altitude of about 530 meters above sea level with a subtropical climate. Summers are hot and dry followed by monsoon months, with approximately 32–35 inches (81–89 cm) of rainfall followed by mild winters in the months of December and January.

The summer daytime temperature can reach 45 °C with 20–25% humidity. Winter night temperatures can fall to 5–6 °C with 20–25% humidity. Annual rainfall is about 32–35 inches (81–89 cm).
