= Gwalior Assembly constituency =

Constituency of the Madhya Pradesh legislative assembly in India

Coordinates: 26.22°N 78.17°E

Gwalior
- Constituency No. 15 for the Madhya Pradesh Legislative Assembly

Constituency details
- Country: India
- Region: Central India
- State: Madhya Pradesh
- District: Gwalior
- Lok Sabha constituency: Gwalior
- Established: 1951
- Reservation: None

Member of Legislative Assembly
- 16th Madhya Pradesh Legislative Assembly
- Incumbent Pradhuman Singh Tomar
- Party: Bharatiya Janata Party
- Elected year: 2023
- Preceded by: Jaibhan Singh Pawaiya

Gwalior Assembly constituency is one of the 230 Vidhan Sabha (Legislative Assembly) constituencies of Madhya Pradesh state in central India. This constituency came into existence in 1951, as one of the 79 Vidhan Sabha constituencies of the erstwhile Madhya Bharat state.

== Overview ==
Gwalior (constituency number 15) is one of the 6 Vidhan Sabha constituencies located in Gwalior district. This constituency covers the ward numbers 1 to 18 and 30 to 33 of the Gwalior Municipal Corporation.

Gwalior is part of Gwalior Lok Sabha constituency along with seven other Vidhan Sabha segments, namely, Gwalior Rural, Gwalior East, Gwalior South, Bhitarwar and Dabra in this district and Karera and Pohari in Shivpuri district.

== Members of Legislative Assembly ==
Year	Name	Party
1952	Purshottam Rao Inamdar	Hindu Mahasabha
1977	Jagdish Gupta	Janata Party
1980	Tara Singh Viyogi	Indian National Congress (I)
1985	Dharamvir	Bharatiya Janata Party
1990	Dharamvir	Bharatiya Janata Party
1993	Raghuvir Singh	Indian National Congress
1998	Narendra Singh Tomar	Bharatiya Janata Party
2003	Narendra Singh Tomar	Bharatiya Janata Party
2008	Pradhuman Singh Tomar	Indian National Congress
2013	Jaibhan Singh Pawaiya	Bharatiya Janata Party
2018	Pradhuman Singh Tomar	Indian National Congress
2020^	Pradhuman Singh Tomar	Bharatiya Janata Party
2023	Pradhuman Singh Tomar	Bharatiya Janata Party

- ^ by-election

== Election results ==
=== 2023 ===
2023 Madhya Pradesh Legislative Assembly election: Gwalior
Party	Candidate	Votes	%	±%
BJP	Pradhuman Singh Tomar	104,775	52.92	▼5.43
INC	Sunil Sharma	85,635	43.26	▲5.03
AAP	Rohit Gupta	1,816	0.92	
NOTA	None of the above	905	0.46	▼0.57
Majority		19,140	9.66	▼10.46
Turnout		197,973	65.77	▲9.09
BJP hold		Swing		

=== 2020 bypolls ===
2020 Madhya Pradesh Legislative Assembly by-elections: Gwalior
Party	Candidate	Votes	%	±%
BJP	Pradhuman Singh Tomar	96,027	58.35	+17.93
INC	Sunil Sharma	62,904	38.23	−14.17
BSP	Harpal Manjhi	2,562	1.56	−1.06
NOTA	None of the above	1,700	1.03	+0.40
Majority		33,123	20.12	+8.14
Turnout		164,559	56.68	−6.53
BJP gain from INC		Swing		

=== 2018 ===
2018 Madhya Pradesh Legislative Assembly election: Gwalior
Party	Candidate	Votes	%	±%
INC	Pradhuman Singh Tomar	92,055	52.4	
BJP	Jaibhan Singh Pawaiya	71,011	40.42	
BSP	Savitri Katariya	4,596	2.62	
AAP	Kuldeep Batham	1,742	0.99	
NOTA	None of the above	1,109	0.63	
Majority		21,044	11.98	
Turnout		175,676	63.21	
INC gain from BJP		Swing		

== See also ==
- Gwalior
