= Pohari Assembly constituency =

Constituency of the Madhya Pradesh legislative assembly in India

Coordinates: 25.54°N 77.36°E

Pohari
- Constituency No. 24 for the Madhya Pradesh Legislative Assembly

Constituency details
- Country: India
- Region: Central India
- State: Madhya Pradesh
- District: Shivpuri
- Lok Sabha constituency: Gwalior
- Established: 1951
- Reservation: None

Member of Legislative Assembly
- 16th Madhya Pradesh Legislative Assembly
- Incumbent Kailash Kushwah
- Party: Indian National Congress
- Elected year: 2023
- Preceded by: Suresh Dhakad

Pohari Assembly constituency (formerly, Pohri) is one of the 230 Vidhan Sabha (Legislative Assembly) constituencies of Madhya Pradesh state in central India. This constituency came into existence in 1951, as Sheopur Pohri, one of the 79 Vidhan Sabha constituencies of the erstwhile Madhya Bharat state.

== Overview ==
Pohari (constituency number 24) is one of the 5 Vidhan Sabha constituencies located in Shivpuri district. This constituency covers the entire Pohari tehsil and parts of Shivpuri and Narwar tehsils of the district.

Pohari is part of Gwalior Lok Sabha constituency along with seven other Vidhan Sabha segments, namely, Karera in this district and Gwalior Rural, Gwalior, Gwalior East, Gwalior South, Bhitarwar and Dabra in Gwalior district.

== Members of Legislative Assembly ==
Madhya Bharat
Election	Name	Party
1952	Malkhan Singh Rawat	Indian National Congress

Madhya Pradesh Legislative Assembly
Election	Name	Party
1962	Tularam	Indian National Congress
1967	B. Arjun	Bharatiya Jana Sangh
1972	Babu Lal	Bharatiya Jana Sangh
1977	Damodar Prasad	Janata Party
1980	Hari Vallabh Shukla	Indian National Congress (Indira)
1985	Himanshu Sharma	Indian National Congress
1990	Jadish Prasad Verma	Bharatiya Janata Party
1993	Baijanti Verma	Independent politician
1998	Narendra Birthare	Bharatiya Janata Party
2003	Hari Vallabh Shukla	Rashtriya Samanta Dal
2008	Prahlad Bharti	Bharatiya Janata Party
2013	Prahlad Bharti	Bharatiya Janata Party
2018	Suresh Dhakad	Indian National Congress
2020^	Suresh Dhakad	Bharatiya Janata Party
2023	Kailash Kushwah	Indian National Congress

^ byelection

== Election results ==
=== 2023 ===
2023 Madhya Pradesh Legislative Assembly election: Pohari
Party	Candidate	Votes	%	±%
INC	Kailash Kushwah	99,739	51.57	+26.36
BJP	Suresh Dhakad	50,258	25.99	−13.23
BSP	Pradhumna Verma (Bachaura)	37,261	19.27	−6.65
NOTA	None of the above	1,556	0.8	−0.25
Majority		49,481	25.58	+12.28
Turnout		193,408	79.37	+3.02
INC gain from BJP		Swing		

=== 2020 bypolls ===
2020 Madhya Pradesh Legislative Assembly by-elections: Pohari
Party	Candidate	Votes	%	±%
BJP	Suresh Dhakad	66,344	39.22	+16.45
BSP	Kailash Kushwah	43,848	25.92	−6.30
INC	Hari Vallabh Shukla	42,638	25.21	−11.85
Independent	Param Singh Rawat	8,079	4.78	
API	Ummed Singh Adiwashi	1,543	0.91	
NOTA	None of the above	1,783	1.05	+0.79
Majority		22,496	13.30	+8.46
Turnout		169,147	76.35	+0.47
BJP gain from INC		Swing		

=== 2018 ===
2018 Madhya Pradesh Legislative Assembly election: Pohari
Party	Candidate	Votes	%	±%
INC	Suresh Dhakad	60,654	37.06	
BSP	Kailash Kushwah	52,736	32.22	
BJP	Prahlad Bharti	37,268	22.77	
Independent	Rakesh Rajak	2,271	1.39	
NOTA	None of the above	428	0.26	
Majority		7,918	4.84	
Turnout		163,666	75.88	
INC gain from BJP		Swing		

== See also ==
- Shivpuri district
- Pohari
