= Lakhan Singh Yadav =

Indian politician

Member of the Madhya Pradesh Legislative Assembly
- Incumbent
- Assumed office 2008
- Constituency: Bhitarwar

Personal details
- Born: 4 June 1964 (age 61) Village Paar, Gwalior district, India
- Party: INC (Indian National Congress)
- Spouse: Sharda Singh Yadav
- Education: B. Sc. in Agriculture
- Alma mater: Agriculture College, Jabalpur
- Profession: Politician
- As of 23 July, 2018 Source: ["Biography" (PDF). Vidhan Sabha, Madhya Pradesh Legislative Assembly.]

Lakhan Singh Yadav is an Indian politician and a member of the Indian National Congress. He is the ex-Cabinet Minister in the Ministry of Animal Husbandry and Fishermen's Welfare.

== Political career ==
Yadav started his early career in association with Bahujan Samaj Party and contested first election from Gird constituency in 1990, he came third.

He again contested in 1993 on a BSP ticket from Gird and lost to Balendu Shukla who later became minister in Digvijaya Singh's cabinet. He successfully contested the 1998 elections to the Legislative Assembly defeating the then minister Balendu Shukla and soon joined INC under the patronage of Digvijaya Singh the then chief minister of Madhya Pradesh.

He contested the 2003 assembly election from Gird constituency on Congress ticket but lost to Brijendra Tiwari of the BJP.

In 2008 he contested from newly constituted Bhitarwar Assembly seat on Congress ticket and defeated BJP candidate Brijendra Tiwari by a margin of 10,000 votes.

In 2013 assembly elections he defeated veteran BJP leader and then minister Anoop Mishra by margin of over 6000 votes.

In 2018 assembly elections he defeated veteran BJP leader and former minister and current MLA of Morena Shri Anoop Mishra by margin of 12000 votes repeatedly.

In 2018, the Congress Party formed the government in Madhya Pradesh, in which he was posted as Cabinet Minister in the Ministry of Animal Husbandry and Fishermen's Welfare.

== Political views ==
He supports Congress Party's ideology and has been a member of MP Congress since 1999.

== Personal life ==
He is married to Smt. Sharda Singh Yadav.

== See also ==
- Madhya Pradesh Legislative Assembly
- 2013 Madhya Pradesh Legislative Assembly election
