= Gwalior Rural Assembly constituency =

Constituency of the Madhya Pradesh legislative assembly in India

Coordinates: 26.35°N 78.43°E

Gwalior Rural
- Constituency No. 14 for the Madhya Pradesh Legislative Assembly

Constituency details
- Country: India
- Region: Central India
- State: Madhya Pradesh
- District: Gwalior
- Lok Sabha constituency: Gwalior
- Established: 2008
- Reservation: None

Member of Legislative Assembly
- 16th Madhya Pradesh Legislative Assembly
- Incumbent Sahab Singh Gurjar
- Party: Indian National Congress
- Elected year: 2023
- Preceded by: Bharat Singh Kushwah

Gwalior Rural Assembly constituency is one of the 230 Vidhan Sabha (Legislative Assembly) constituencies of Madhya Pradesh state in central India. This constituency came into existence in 2008, following the delimitation of the legislative assembly constituencies. It covers part of the erstwhile Morar constituency, which was abolished in 2008.

== Overview ==
Gwalior Rural (constituency number 14) is one of the 6 Vidhan Sabha constituencies located in Gwalior district. This constituency covers Morar Cantonment and part of Gwalior tehsil of the district.

Gwalior Rural is part of Gwalior Lok Sabha constituency along with seven other Vidhan Sabha segments, namely, Gwalior, Gwalior East, Gwalior South, Bhitarwar and Dabra in this district and Karera and Pohari in Shivpuri district.

== Members of Legislative Assembly ==
Election	Name	Party
2008	Madan Kushwah	Bahujan Samaj Party
2013	Bharat Singh Kushwah	Bharatiya Janata Party
2018	Bharat Singh Kushwah	Bharatiya Janata Party
2023	Sahab Singh Gurjar	Indian National Congress

== Election results ==
=== 2023 ===
2023 Madhya Pradesh Legislative Assembly election: Gwalior Rural
Party	Candidate	Votes	%	±%
INC	Sahab Singh Gurjar	79,841	42.34	+17.76
BJP	Bharat Singh Kushwah	76,559	40.6	+7.76
BSP	Suresh Baghel	26,990	14.31	−17.55
NOTA	None of the above	311	0.16	−0.71
Majority		3,282	1.74	+0.76
Turnout		188,560	74.64	+5.52
INC gain from BJP		Swing		

=== 2018 ===
2018 Madhya Pradesh Legislative Assembly election: Gwalior Rural
Party	Candidate	Votes	%	±%
BJP	Bharat Singh Kushwah	51,033	32.84	
BSP	Sahab Singh Gurjar	49,516	31.86	
INC	Madan Kushwah	38,199	24.58	
Bahujan Sangharsh Dal	Phool Singh Baraiya	7,698	4.95	
AAP	Balveer Singh Baghel	2,689	1.73	
NOTA	None of the above	1,349	0.87	
Majority		1,517	0.98	
Turnout		155,404	69.12	
BJP gain from		Swing		

== See also ==
- Morar Cantonment
