= Shakuntala Khatik =

Indian politician

Member of the Madhya Pradesh Legislative Assembly
- Incumbent
- Assumed office 2013
- Preceded by: Ramesh Prasad Khatik
- Constituency: Karera

Personal details
- Born: 15 November 1965 (age 60) Moth, Jhansi district
- Party: Indian National Congress
- Spouse: Lakhanlal Khatik
- Children: 5
- Education: HSC
- Profession: Politician
- As of 27 July, 2018 Source: ["Biography" (PDF). Vidhan Sabha, Madhya Pradesh Legislative Assembly.]

Shakuntala Khatik is an Indian politician and a member of the Indian National Congress party. She has been Member of Legislative Assembly from Karera constituency.

== Personal life ==
She is married to Lakhanlal Khatik and has three sons and one daughter.

== Political career ==
She contested the 2008 assembly elections unsuccessfully but she became an MLA for the first time in 2013.

== Legal affairs ==
There was an FIR against Shakuntala for inciting a mob to burn down a police station during the protests against Mandsaur Firing in June 2017 in Karera.

== See also ==
- Madhya Pradesh Legislative Assembly
- 2013 Madhya Pradesh Legislative Assembly election
- 2008 Madhya Pradesh Legislative Assembly election
