= Sahab Singh Gurjar =

Indian politician

Member of the Madhya Pradesh Legislative Assembly

Sahab Singh Gurjar (born 1971) is an Indian politician from Madhya Pradesh, India. He is an MLA of Indian National Congress from Gwalior Rural Assembly constituency of Gwalior district. He won the 2023 Madhya Pradesh Legislative Assembly election. He received a total of 79,841 votes and won with the margin of 3,282 votes.
