= Rau Assembly constituency =

Constituency of the Madhya Pradesh legislative assembly in India

Coordinates: 22.64°N 75.80°E

Rau
- Constituency No. 210 for the Madhya Pradesh Legislative Assembly

Constituency details
- Country: India
- Region: Central India
- State: Madhya Pradesh
- District: Indore
- Lok Sabha constituency: Indore
- Established: 2008
- Reservation: None

Member of Legislative Assembly
- 16th Madhya Pradesh Legislative Assembly
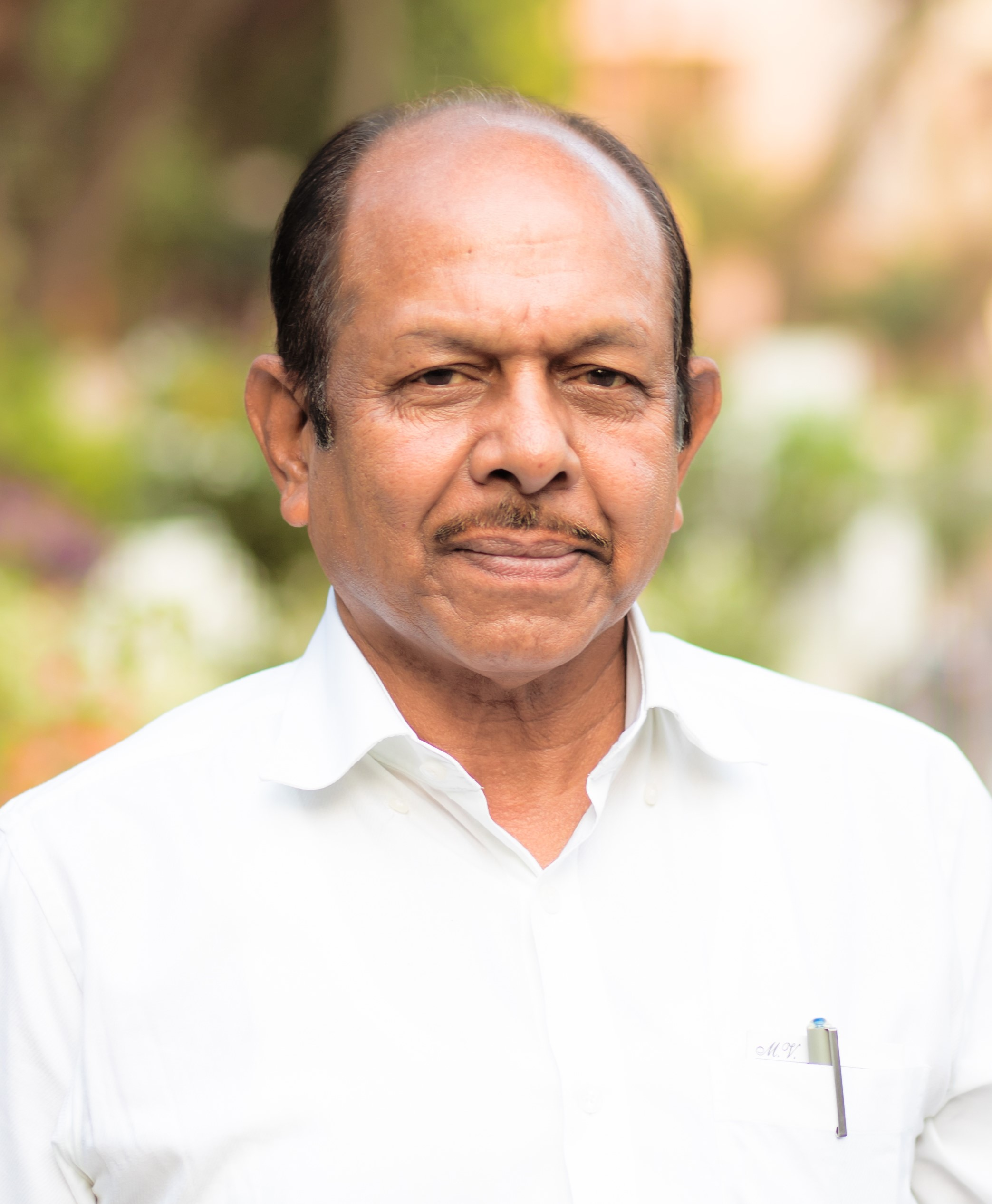
- Incumbent Madhu Verma
- Party: Bharatiya Janata Party
- Elected year: 2023
- Preceded by: Jitu Patwari

Rau Assembly constituency is one of the 230 Vidhan Sabha (Legislative Assembly) constituencies of Madhya Pradesh state in central India.

== Overview ==
Rau Assembly constituency is one of the 8 Vidhan Sabha constituencies located in Indore district which comes under Indore (Lok Sabha constituency). Constituency includes Rau, Ralamandal, Piplya Patwari, Palda, Bicholi Hapsi and suburb of Indore city.

== Members of Legislative Assembly ==
Election	Name	Party
2008	Jitu Jirati	Bharatiya Janata Party
2013	Jitu Patwari	Indian National Congress
2018	Jitu Patwari	Indian National Congress
2023	Madhu Verma	Bharatiya Janata Party

== Election results ==
=== 2023 ===
2023 Madhya Pradesh Legislative Assembly election: Rau
Party	Candidate	Votes	%	±%
BJP	Madhu Verma	151,672	55.42	+8.11
INC	Jitu Patwari	116,150	42.44	−7.51
BSP	Devki Mandloi	1,051	0.39	N/A
NOTA	None of the above	2,104	0.77	−0.38
Majority		35,522	12.98	+10.34
Turnout		273,657	76.71	+2.18
BJP gain from INC		Swing		

=== 2018 ===
2018 Madhya Pradesh Legislative Assembly election: Rau
Party	Candidate	Votes	%	±%
INC	Jitu Patwari	107,740	49.95	
BJP	Madhu Verma	102,037	47.31	
BSP	Raju Yadav	1,172	0.55	N/A
NOTA	None of the above	2,475	1.15	
Majority		5,703	2.64	
Turnout		215,687	74.53	
INC hold		Swing		

=== 2013 ===
2013 Madhya Pradesh Legislative Assembly election: Rau
Party	Candidate	Votes	%	±%
INC	Jitu Patwari	91,885	54.10	
BJP	Jitu Jirati	73,326	43.17	
BSP	Prem Singh Gurjar (Captain)	776	0.46	N/A
Independent	Anand Omprakash Bhatia	486	0.29	
Independent	Anil Jitu Jiratee	431	0.25	
SP	Sanny	247	0.15	
NOTA	None of the Above	2697	1.59	
Majority				
Turnout		169848	73.25	
Swing to INC from BJP		Swing		

== See also ==
- Indore
- Indore (Lok Sabha constituency)
