= Madhu Verma (economist) =

Indian environmental economist

- Born: 4 July 1961 (age 65)

Academic work
- Discipline: Environmental economics Economic Valuation & Green Accounting of Ecosystems & Biodiversity
- Institutions: List: WRI India Indian Institute of Forest Management (IIFM) IORA Ecological Solutions

Madhu Verma is an Indian environmental economist and policy analyst. She is Senior Economic Adviser and Chief Environmental Economist at IORA Ecological Solutions. Her work has focused on the economic valuation of ecosystems and biodiversity, green accounting, ecosystem services, conservation finance, and payment for ecosystem services.

== Education and career ==
She is a biological science graduate with MA, M.Phil. and Ph.D. in economics with specialization in Regional Planning and Economic Growth from Barkatullah University, India.

Verma was an economist with the Government of Madhya Pradesh from 1984 to 1994 and a professor at the Indian Institute of Forest Management (IIFM) from 1994 to 2019. In 2007, she established the Centre for Ecological Services Management at IIFM.

She served as Chief Economist at World Resources Institute (WRI) India from 2019 to 2023 before joining IORA Ecological Solutions.

She has authored the pioneer work of Economic Valuation of Tiger Reserves in India (2015 and 2019), which has influenced the policies and decision-making process of the government.

In 2017, she co-authored a study in Ecosystem Services that estimated the economic value of ecosystem services provided by six Indian tiger reserves.

She has also authored and contributed in several international reports like the UN's Millennium Ecosystem Assessment Report (2004–06); The Economics of Ecosystem and Biodiversity (TEEB) Reports (2007–2011); and the Global Assessment of Resources for Implementing the Strategic Plan for Biodiversity in 2011 to 2020.

== Honors and awards ==
- World Bank EMCaB Fellowship (2001).
- LEAD Fellowship (2007).
- Fulbright-Nehru Environmental Leadership Fellowship (2012).
- Fellow of the Indian Society for Ecological Economics (2019).

== Selected bibliography ==
- Making the hidden visible: Economic valuation of tiger reserves in India.
- The IPBES Conceptual Framework – connecting nature and people.
- Guidance manual for the valuation of regulating services. 2010. United Nations Environment Programme.
