= Praveen Pathak =

Indian politician

Member of Madhya Pradesh Legislative Assembly
- In office 2018–2023
- Preceded by: Narayan Singh Kushwah
- Succeeded by: Narayan Singh Kushwah
- Constituency: Gwalior South

Personal details
- Born: 7 June 1982 (age 44)
- Party: Indian National Congress
- Parent: Satyaprakash Pathak
- Education: Graduate (BA)
- Alma mater: Jiwaji University

Praveen Pathak is an Indian National Congress politician and was a member of the Madhya Pradesh Legislative Assembly between 2018 and 2023, elected from Gwalior South.

In 2024 Lok Sabha Election Pathak defeated by 70210 votes. BJP's Bharat Singh Kushwah won this election.

== In popular culture ==
Praveen Pathak appeared on the Pov Podcast, where he discussed various pressing issues, including crime in Gwalior, youth employment, his personal life, and the upcoming Lok Sabha Elections. During the podcast, he shared his views on law enforcement challenges, the role of governance in reducing crime rates, and strategies to improve job opportunities for the youth. He also reflected on his political journey and future aspirations.
