= Pradhuman Singh Tomar =

Indian politician

Minister of Energy Madhya Pradesh Government
- Incumbent
- Assumed office 25 December 2023
- Chief Minister: Mohan Yadav
- Preceded by: Priyavrat Singh

Member of the Madhya Pradesh Legislative Assembly
- Incumbent
- Assumed office December 2018
- Preceded by: Jaibhan Singh Pawaiya
- Constituency: Gwalior
- In office 2008–2013
- Preceded by: Narendra Singh Tomar
- Constituency: Gwalior

Personal details
- Born: 1 January 1970 (age 56)
- Party: Bharatiya Janata Party (2020 onwards)
- Parent: Hakim Singh Tomar (father)
- Occupation: Politician

Pradhuman Singh Tomar is an Indian politician. He is a member of the Bharatiya Janata Party. He is currently the Energy minister of Madhya Pradesh in Shivraj Singh Chouhan's 2020 Cabinet. He was a Member of the Madhya Pradesh Legislative Assembly from Gwalior in Gwalior from December 2018 to March 2020. And he also served as a Member of legislative assembly in 2008 from Gwalior. Shri Tomar comes from Scindia Circle and is known as Scindia samarthak.

== See also ==
- 2020 Madhya Pradesh political crisis
