= Narayan Singh Kushwah =

Indian politician

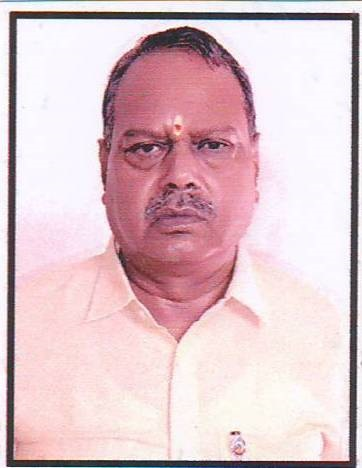

Cabinet Minister of Madhya Pradesh Legislative Assembly
- Incumbent
- Assumed office Dec 2023
- Constituency: Gwalior South Assembly constituency

Member of the Madhya Pradesh Social Justice Horticulture Food Processing

Member of the Madhya Pradesh Legislative Assembly
- In office 2008–2018
- Succeeded by: Praveen Pathak
- Constituency: Gwalior South Assembly constituency

Personal details
- Party: Bharatiya Janata Party
- Children: 6

Narayan Singh Kushwah alternatively spelt as Narayan Singh Kushwaha, is an Indian politician and member of the Bharatiya Janata Party. Kushwah was a member of the Madhya Pradesh Legislative Assembly from the Gwalior South constituency in Gwalior district. He was the former Minister of State for Home Affairs in the Shivraj Singh Chauhan cabinet. Kushwah has also served as the state president of Bhartiya Janata Party's Other Backward Class wing (BJP pichhada warg morcha) for the state of Madhya Pradesh.

== Life and career ==
Kushwah belongs to Kachhi sub-caste of the wider Kushwaha community and has played instrumental role as a community leader in organising his caste by forming organisations and conducting conferences. He represents Gwalior South Assembly constituency, ever since its formation. In 2008 Madhya Pradesh Assembly elections, he won the newly constituted constituency after the delimitation exercise by defeating Rashmi Pawar Sharma of Indian National Congress. While Sharma secured 32,316 votes, Kushwah secured 40,061 votes. In 2013 Madhya Pradesh Legislative Assembly elections, he retained the seat for the second time. In this election, he defeated Ramesh Agrawal of Indian National Congress. Kushwah secured 68,627 votes and Agarwal got 52,360 votes to finish in second spot. However, in 2018 Assembly elections, he was defeated by Praveen Pathak of INC by a small margin of votes. The INC candidate got 56,369 votes (36.98% of total valid votes polled), and Kushwah got 56,248 votes (36.90%).

During his tenure as Minister of State for Home Affairs, Kushwah protested again his own government for deteriorating law and order situation in the state. It was reported that he lacked effective powers as minister to transfer the officials or control the administrative affairs of his department.
