= Ramesh Prasad Khatik =

Indian politician

MLA, Legislative Assembly
- Incumbent
- Assumed office 2023
- Constituency: Karera
- In office 2008–2013

Personal details
- Born: 1969 (age 56–57) Karera District
- Party: Bharatiya Janata Party
- Parent: Babu Lal Khatik (Father)
- Education: 12th 1986
- Occupation: Agriculture
- Profession: Politician

Ramesh Prasad Khatik also known as Ramesh Khatik is an Indian politician and a member of the Legislative Assembly of Madhya Pradesh representing the Karera constituency and is a member of the Bhartiya Janata Party.

== Early life and education ==
Ramesh completed 12th class Madhyamik Education, Bhopal, Madhya Pradesh in 1986.

== Political career ==
Ramesh Prasad Khatik is an Indian politician and a member of the Legislative Assembly of India representing the Karera constituency of Madhya Pradesh and is a member of the Bhartiya Janata Party.
