= Madhu Verma (politician) =

Indian politician

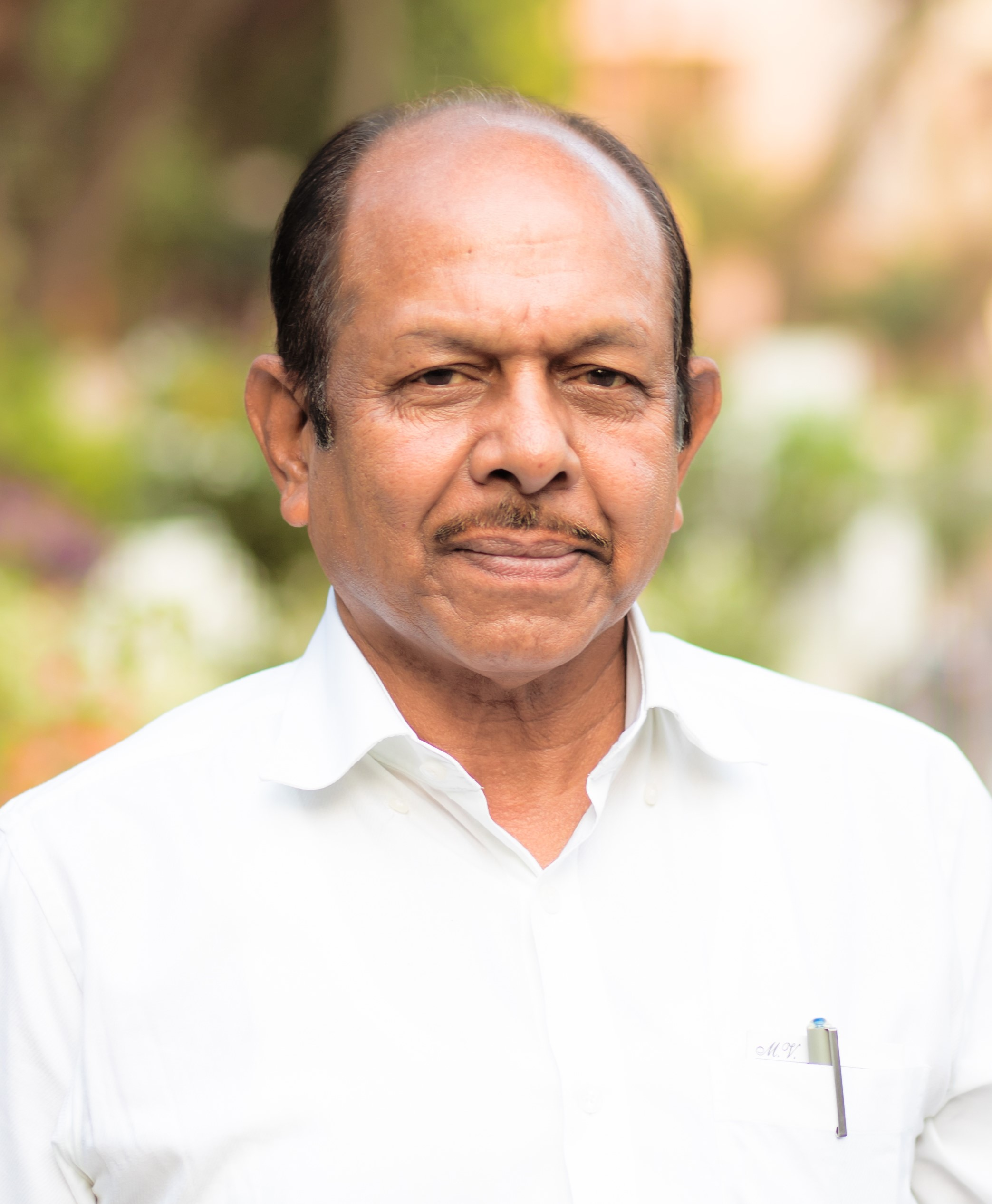

Member of the Madhya Pradesh Legislative Assembly
- Incumbent
- Assumed office 3 December 2023
- Preceded by: Jitu Patwari
- Constituency: Rau

Chairman of Indore Development Authority
- In office 24 December 2003 – 2009
- Succeeded by: Prabhat Parashar

Member of Indore Municipal Corporation
- In office 2000–2005
- Constituency: Ward 67, Indore
- In office 1995–2000
- Constituency: Ward 69, Indore
- In office 1983–1987
- Constituency: Ward 56, Indore

Personal details
- Born: 8 March 1952 (age 74) Indore, Madhya Pradesh, India
- Party: Bharatiya Janata Party
- Profession: Politician
- Source

Mahadev Verma popularly known as Madhu Verma is an Indian politician, social activist and member of the Madhya Pradesh Legislative Assembly. He is from Bharatiya Janata Party and elected from Rau constituency in 2023 Assembly election.
