= Madhya Pradesh Youth Congress =

Indian political youth organization

Madhya Pradesh Youth Congress मध्य प्रदेश युवा कांग्रेस
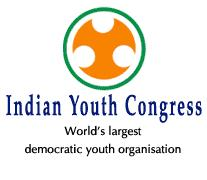
- President: Yash Lakhan Ghanghoria
- Chairperson: Rahul Gandhi
- Headquarters: Bhopal
- Mother party: Indian Youth Congress
- Website: iyc.in

The Madhya Pradesh Youth Congress or MP Youth Congress is the state body of the Indian Youth Congress, youth wing of Indian National Congress. Yash Lakhan Ghanghoria is the President of Madhya Pradesh Youth Congress.

== Issue stances ==
=== Mandsaur Farmers' Unrest ===
In 2017, the Madhya Pradesh Youth Congress president submitted a memorandum to the Governor of Madhya Pradesh demanding dismissal of the State Government run by Bharatiya Janata Party (BJP) and CM Shivraj Singh over the deaths of six farmers in Mandsaur police firing during Farmers' Protest in 2017.

They had also planned a Dharna (sit-in) for the farmers' cause.

=== PM Modi's Pakoda Rozgaar ===
The Youth Congress in February 2018, had set up a Pakoda stall in Bhopal to protest against PM Narendra Modi's statement that, even selling pakodas is employment. This has irked many youngsters, who are trying hard to land a job.
