= Kailash Kushwah =

Indian politician

Member of the Madhya Pradesh Legislative Assembly
- Incumbent
- Assumed office 2023
- Constituency: Pohari Assembly constituency

Personal details
- Party: Indian National Congress

Kailash Kushwah (born 1979) is an Indian politician from Madhya Pradesh, India. He is an MLA of Indian National Congress from Pohari Assembly constituency of Shivpuri district. He won the 2023 Madhya Pradesh Legislative Assembly election. He received a total of 99,739 votes and won with the margin of 49,481 votes.

He defeated both BJP candidate Suresh Dhakad and Bahujan Samaj Party candidate Pradhumna Verma in a triangular contest.
