= Gwalior Municipal Corporation =

Local civic body in Gwalior, Madhya Pradesh, India

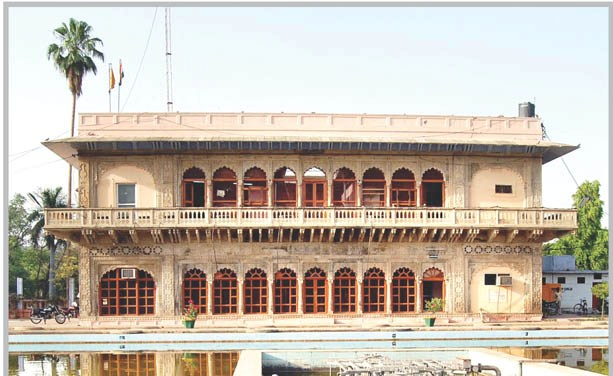
- Gwalior Municipal Assembly - Italian Garden
- Formation: 1887
- Type: Municipal Corporation
- Headquarters: Gwalior
- Official language: Hindi, English
- Leader: Shobha Satish Sikarwar (INC)
- Key people: Akshay Kumar Singh (IAS)
- Budget: ₹17,278,444,820.34 (US$180 million) (2019-2020)
- Website: Official website

Gwalior Municipal Corporation (GMC) is the Municipal Corporation established in 1887, it is responsible for the civic infrastructure and administration of the city of Gwalior, located in Madhya Pradesh, India. This civic administrative body administers an area of 414 km^{2} (160 sq mi). The GMC is formally headed by Shobha Satish Sikarwar (INC), present Mayor of Gwalior.

== Overview ==
The city is currently divided into 66 wards. Each ward elects a corporator. The winning party elects a council of members, who are responsible for various departments. The council members chose the mayor among themselves. At present, there are sixty-one members in the council. The commissioner of Gwalior is the highest officer of Municipal Corporate Office, which is responsible for the departments of public works, revenue and tax, water supply, planning and development, fire brigade, health and sanitation, finance and accounts etc. The current Municipal Commissioner of Gwalior is Kishor Kanyal (I A S), while the current mayor is Shobha Satish Sikarwar.

== History ==
=== 1887 to 1912 ===
Gwalior Municipal Corporation came into existence on 6 June 1887. It was established by the Council of Regency which was responsible for administration of the Gwalior Estate.

In 1904, general functions of urban local bodies like city planning, sanitation etc. were assigned to the Gwalior Municipal Corporation along with establishment of a separate Municipal Corporation for Old Gwalior.

In the year 1912, yet another Municipal Corporation was established for Morar Nagar. It functioned in accordance with the Municipal Act which was formulated in 1911 but was implemented in 1912.

=== 1913 to 1954 ===
After the implementation of Municipal Corporation Act in the year 1913, a separate governing body was established by the elected members of board and His Highness, Madhavrao Scindia resigned from the post of chairperson which he occupied until 1912.

In the year 1922, a new board was formed with 45 members, where 30 members were elected, and 15 members were nominated from different parts of the city. During the governance of this board, Gwalior city saw many remarkable changes, most remarkable being the establishment of a Power House at Motijheel and Water Supply Plant to supply water to the entire city.

The Municipal Corporation Act which was implemented in the year 1912 saw some amendments in the year 1936 and was implemented with fresh rules for governance in the year 1937. Salient features of this amendment included the power to select Chairperson through voting by the members of the Council. Before this amendment the Chairperson was elected by nomination.

=== 1954 to present ===
After independence the Municipal Corporation Act was revised yet again and this paved way for establishment of Central India Municipal Corporation Act in the year 1954. This led to an increase in the limits of Gwalior Municipal Corporation to include another 18 square miles.

In 1956, the reorganising of states of India led to creation of Madhya Pradesh. This resulted in Gwalior and Indore Municipalities being awarded the status of Municipal Corporations and the implementation of new Municipal Corporation Act. GMC was divided into 34 blocks and was governed by 40 elected members and 10 members of Central India Municipal Corporation who were transferred by voting method.

The elections of Municipal Council were again held in 1969 in which out of the 52 councillors, 42 councillors were elected and 10 councillors were nominated by the elected members. Gwalior Municipal Corporation extended its scope of work and included another 75 villages in its limit to extend its jurisdiction to an area of 414 square kilometres (160 sq mi).

Gwalior Municipal Corporation was again restructured on 24 May 1983 and the number of elected members was increased to 52 with 10 nominated members and Mayor of the Gwalior Municipal Corporation.

The term of the Council ended in 1987 which led to the State Government taking charge of the Corporation for 7 years. In the year 1994, elections were held and the number of members was increased to 67 members, 60 of which were elected and 6 councillors were nominated by the Government. In 1994, State Government created the post of Chairperson of the council who was elected by the councillors.

In the year 2000, the process of election was changed and the Councilors and Mayor were elected directly by the public to create a council for the term of 5 years. In the year 2004 the election were held again and the Council is still in term with 60 elected councillors, 6 members nominated by the Government and the Mayor.

== Departments ==
- Fire Brigade
- Property Dayara (Property Record Keeping)
- Udyan (Public Garden Maintenance)
- Zoo
- Revenue
- Dukan Sansthan (Shop Establishment License)
- Building Permission
- Colony Layout
- G.A.D.
- Legal Section
- Pension
- Payroll
- Workshop
- Accounts
- Complaints
- PHE (Public Health Engineering)
- Property (Record Keeping)
- Birth Death (Record keeping)
- Central Purchase
- Parishad (Council)

== Wards ==
Zone	Ward Number	Ward Name	Areas Covered	Assembly Constituency	Councillor	Political Group
	1	Gargaj ward			Saeeda Begum Arif Ali	Congress
	2	Bhuteshwar ward			Asha Surendra Chauhan	BJP
	3	Shabd pratap ashram			Manju Rajput	BJP
	4	Koteshwar			Rekha Chandan Rai	BJP
	5	Tameshwar			Premprakash Sharma	Congress
	6	Mangleshwar			Deepak Manjhi	BJP
	7	Indira nagar			Monika Manish Sharma	Congress
	8	Shramik			Manoj Rajput	Congress
	9	Kashi naresh			Anita Ramu Kushwah	Congress
	10	Bhanupratap			Shakeel Khan Mansuri- jhute wade krne wala	Congress
	11	Azad chandra shekhar			Anita Pradeep Ratnakar	BJP
	12	Subhash Ward			Meera Mansingh Rajput	BJP
	13	Samrat Tansen			Jyoti Vinod Sikarwar	BJP
	14	Sewa nagar			Vinod Mathu Yadav	Congress
	15	Madhvi			Devendra Rathore	BJP
	16	Lal bahadur shashtri			Mahendra Arya	BJP
	17	Chhatrapati shivaji			Kiran Dharmendra Verma	Congress
	18	Tilak			Rekha Tripathi	BJP
	19	Maharana pratap			Kamlesh Balveer Tomar	BJP
	20	Hariram chandra diwakar			Manjulata Jitendra Singh	BJP
	21	Panchsheel			Brajesh Singh Bais	BJP
	22	Kabir			Pramod Khare	Congress
	23	Dwarikadheesh			Suresh Singh Solanki	BJP
	24	Swami dayanand			Nagendra Singh Rana	BJP
	25	Shahid Bhagat singh			Preeti Sanjay Parmar	BJP
	26	Dr harihar dwedi			Mamta Arvind Sharma	BJP
	27	Shyamlal pandiya			Laxmi Suresh Singh Gurjar	Congress
	28	Shanti niketan			Gayatri Sudhir Mandelia	Congress
	29	Swami vivekanand			Girraj Singh Kanshana	BJP
	30	Captain Roopsingh			Rekha Anil Tripathi	BJP
	31	Dr rajendra prasad			Anjana Shivhare	BJP
	32	Veerangna bai			Vivek Sonu Tripathi	BJP
	33	Ravidas nagar			Sunita Arunesh Kushwah	BJP
	34	Mahatma gandhi			Ravindra Singh Tomar	BJP
	35	Lala lajpat			Chandni Jungbahadur Chauhan	Congress
	36	Rajiv nagar			Bhavana Bhikam Kannojia	BJP
	37	Ustaj hafiz ali			Anita Dhakad	Congress
	38	Ambedkar			Bhagwan Singh Kushwah	BJP
	39	Tatya tope			Rajabeti Rakesh Mahaur	BJP
	40	Maharaj DholIbua math			Sanjeev Potnish Kelkar	BJP
	41	Hemukalani			Mohit Jat	BJP
	42	Sant jhulelal			Mamta Ajay Tiwari	BJP
	43	Shahid amar chandra bathia			Sanjay Singhal	BJP
	44	Methli saran gupt			Yamini Naveen Pandey	BJP
	45	Achleshwar			Ankit Gupta	Congress
	46	Bhikam chandra jain			Kapil Sharma	Congress
	47	Pt. krishanrao shankarrao			Jitendra Mudgal Bablu	BJP
	48	Captain gaur			Haripal Singh	BJP
	49	Mahatma jyotiba phule			Rashmi Satish Bohre	BJP
	50	Mansur shah data			Anil Sankhla	BJP
	51	Ashfaq ullah khan			Premlata Dharmendra Jain	Congress
	52	Jagjivan			Sandhya Sonu Kushwah	Congress
	53	Major kartaar singh			Yogendra Mangal Yadav	Congress
	54	Jawahar			Upasana Sanjay Yadav	Congress
	55	Maqbool ahmed			Manoj Singh Tomar	BJP
	56	Lohiya			Surendra Sahu	Congress
	57	Sanjay gandhi			Awadhesh Kaurav	Congress
	58	Mahaadji Scindia			Aparna Patil	BJP
	59	Harisingh darshan			Saroj Hevran Singh Kanshana	Congress
	60	Pt ravishankar			Kedar Singh Barhadiya	Congress
	61	Sirotha bai			Nathuram	Independent
	62	Bhadrauli			Gora Ashok Singh	BJP
	63	Jamahar			Uma Shiv Singh Yadav	Independent
	64	Purani chhavni			Manoj Singh Yadav	Independent
	65	Girvai			Geeta Bhupendra Kushwah	BJP
	66	Naugaon			Usha Girraj Mawai	BJP

== Revenue sources ==
The following are the Income sources for the Corporation from the Central and State Government.

=== Revenue from taxes ===
Following is the Tax related revenue for the corporation.

- Property tax.
- Profession tax.
- Entertainment tax.
- Grants from Central and State Government like Goods and Services Tax.
- Advertisement tax.

=== Revenue from non-tax sources ===
Following is the Non Tax related revenue for the corporation.

- Water usage charges.
- Fees from Documentation services.
- Rent received from municipal property.
- Funds from municipal bonds.

== See also ==
- List of municipal corporations in India
