= Gwalior South Assembly constituency =

Constituency of the Madhya Pradesh legislative assembly in India

Coordinates: 26.17°N 78.17°E

Gwalior South
- Constituency No. 17 for the Madhya Pradesh Legislative Assembly

Constituency details
- Country: India
- Region: Central India
- State: Madhya Pradesh
- District: Gwalior
- Lok Sabha constituency: Gwalior
- Established: 2008
- Reservation: None

Member of Legislative Assembly
- 16th Madhya Pradesh Legislative Assembly
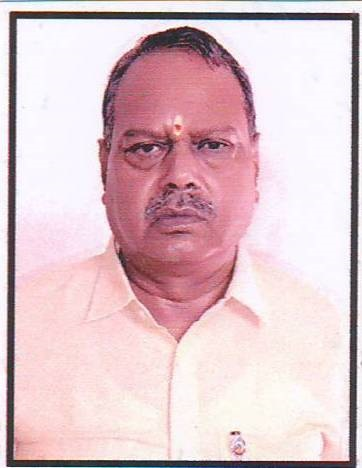
- Incumbent Narayan Singh Kushwah
- Party: Bharatiya Janata Party
- Elected year: 2023
- Preceded by: Praveen Pathak

Gwalior South Assembly constituency is one of the 230 Vidhan Sabha (Legislative Assembly) constituencies of Madhya Pradesh state in central India. This constituency came into existence in 2008, following the delimitation of the legislative assembly constituencies.

== Overview ==
Gwalior South (constituency number 17) is one of the 6 Vidhan Sabha constituencies located in Gwalior district. This constituency covers the ward numbers 34, 35 and 37 to 44 and 46 to 55 of the Gwalior Municipal Corporation.

Gwalior South is part of Gwalior Lok Sabha constituency along with six other Vidhan Sabha segments, namely, Gwalior, Gwalior East, Gwalior Rural, Bhitarwar and Dabra in this district.

== Members of Legislative Assembly ==
| Election | Name | Party |
|---|---|---|
| 2008 | Narayan Singh Kushwah | Bharatiya Janata Party |
| 2013 | Narayan Singh Kushwah | Bharatiya Janata Party |
| 2018 | Praveen Pathak | Indian National Congress |
| 2023 | Narayan Singh Kushwah | Bharatiya Janata Party |

== Election results ==
=== 2023 ===
2023 Madhya Pradesh Legislative Assembly election: Gwalior South
| Party | Candidate | Votes | % | ±% |
|---|---|---|---|---|
| BJP | Narayan Singh Kushwah | 82,317 | 49.4 | +12.5 |
| INC | Praveen Pathak | 79,781 | 47.88 | +10.9 |
| NOTA | None of the above | 1,121 | 0.67 | −0.35 |
| Majority | | 2,536 | 1.52 | +1.44 |
| Turnout | | 166,628 | 64.51 | +4.15 |
| BJP gain from INC | | Swing | | |

=== 2018 ===
2018 Madhya Pradesh Legislative Assembly election: Gwalior South
| Party | Candidate | Votes | % | ±% |
|---|---|---|---|---|
| INC | Praveen Pathak | 56,369 | 36.98 | |
| BJP | Narayan Singh Kushwah | 56,248 | 36.9 | |
| Independent | Sameeksha Gupta | 30,745 | 20.17 | |
| BSP | Aseem Shah | 3,098 | 2.03 | |
| NOTA | None of the above | 1,550 | 1.02 | |
| Majority | | 121 | 0.08 | |
| Turnout | | 152,430 | 60.36 | |
| INC hold | | Swing | | |

== See also ==
- Gwalior
