= Maya Singh =

Indian politician

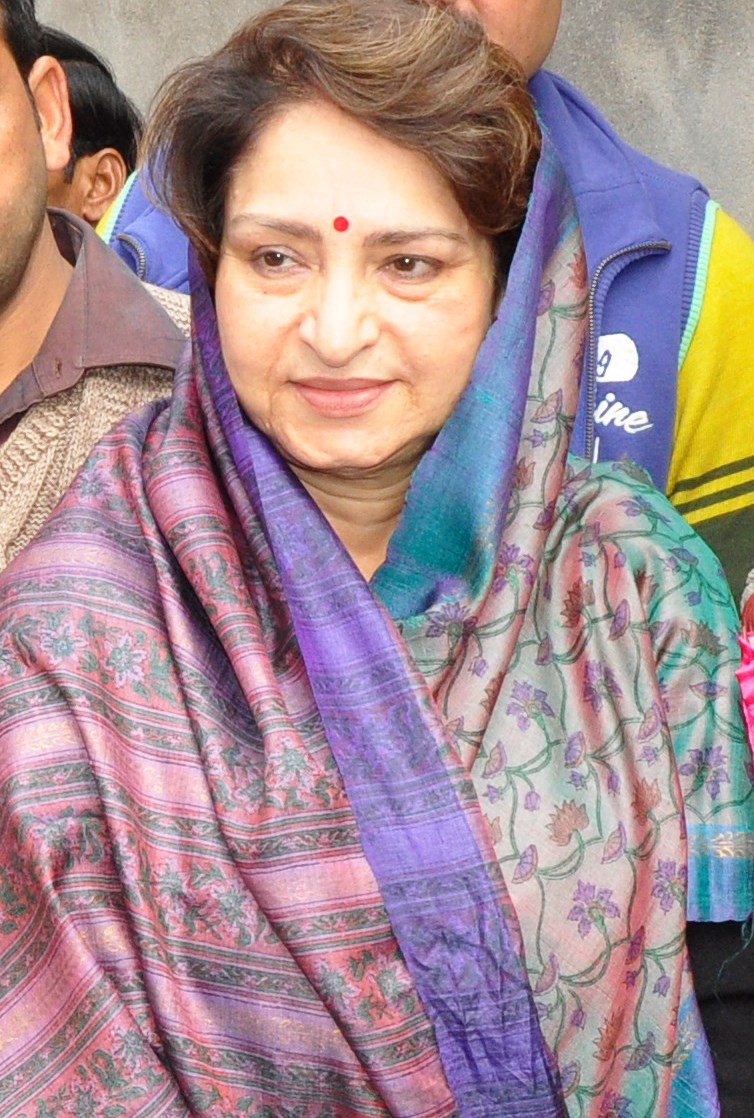
- Maya Singh at an event in Gwalior

Minister of Urban Development and Housing, Madhya Pradesh Government
- In office 2016 – December 2018
- Succeeded by: Jaivardhan Singh

Member of Legislative Assembly from Madhya Pradesh
- In office 2013 – December 2018
- Succeeded by: Munnalal Goyal
- Constituency: Gwalior East

Personal details
- Born: 15 August 1950 (age 75)
- Party: Bharatiya Janata Party
- Spouse: Dhyanendra Singh

Maya Singh (born 15 August 1950) is an Indian politician from Bharatiya Janata Party and a former Member of Parliament representing Madhya Pradesh in Rajya Sabha. She was a cabinet minister in the Government of Madhya Pradesh, holding the Women and Child Development portfolio in 2016 and serving as minister for Urban Development and Housing from 2016 to December 2018.

On 8 December 2013 Singh was elected as a member of the legislative assembly after winning Legislative Assembly elections in Gwalior.
