= 2013 Madhya Pradesh Legislative Assembly election =

Indian state election

2013 Madhya Pradesh Legislative Assembly election मध्य प्रदेश विधान सभा, 2013
- November 25, 2013

All 230 seats in the Madhya Pradesh Legislative Assembly 116 seats needed for a majority
- Turnout: 72.69% ▲3.06%

	First party	Second party
Leader	Shivraj Singh Chouhan	Jyotiraditya Scindia
Party	BJP	INC
Leader since	2005	2001
Leader's seat	Budhni (retained) Vidisha (vacated)	Did not contest
Seats before	143	71
Seats after	165	58
Seat change	▲22	▼13
Popular vote	15,191,335	12,315,253
Percentage	44.88%	36.38%
Swing	▲7.65%	▲3.99%
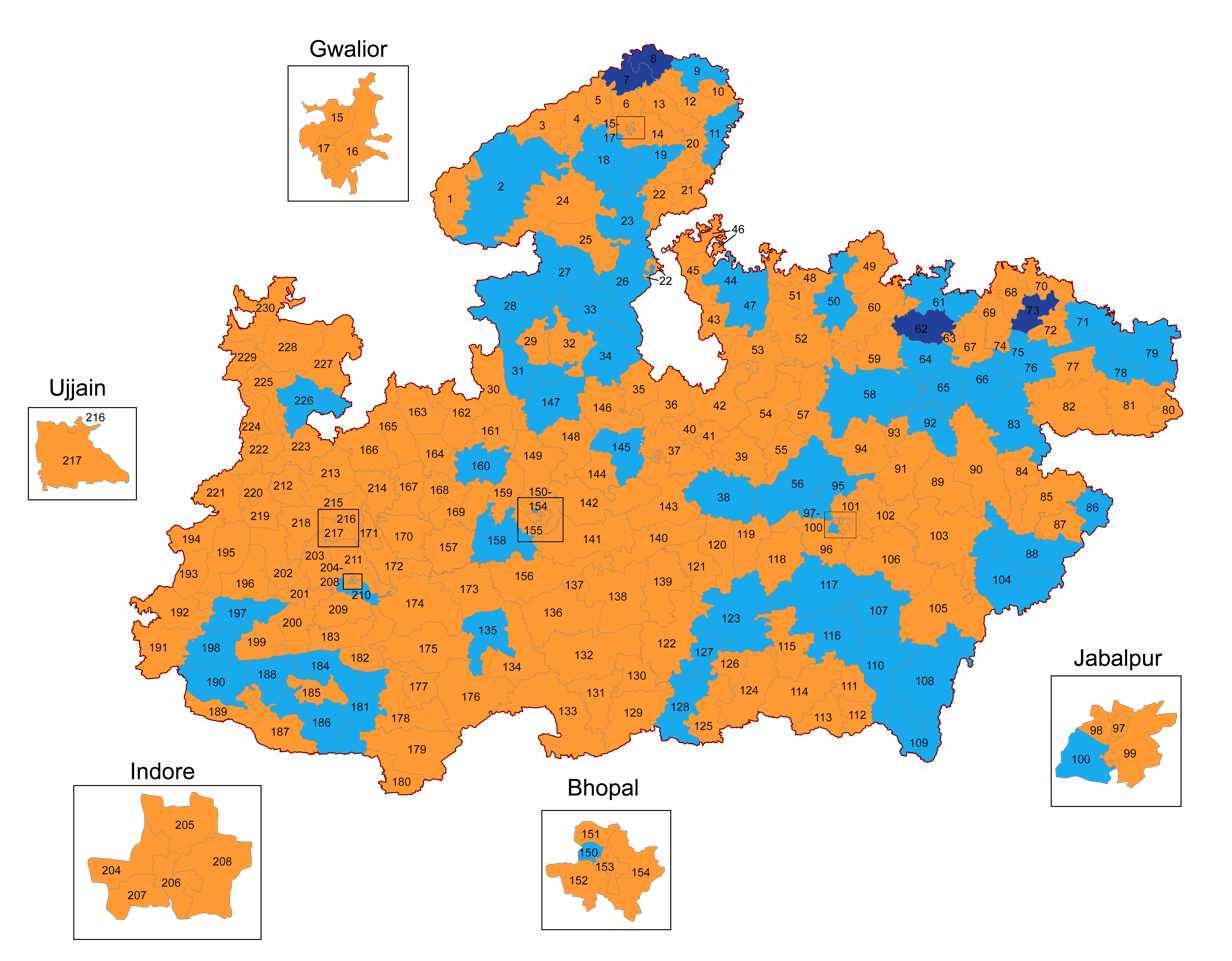
- 2013 Legislative Assembly election Madhya Pradesh

- Structure of the Madhya Pradesh Legislative Assembly after the election
Chief Minister before election
Shivraj Singh Chouhan
BJP
Elected Chief Minister
Shivraj Singh Chouhan
BJP

A Legislative Assembly election was held on 25 November 2013 in Madhya Pradesh, India, with the result announced on 8 December. Along with four other state assembly elections, these were the first elections in which the Election Commission of India (ECI) implemented a "None of the above" (NOTA) voting option, allowing the electorate to register a neutral vote but not to outright reject candidates. In a first, the Election Commission of India also appointed Central Awareness Observers, whose main task was to oversee voter awareness and facilitation.

== Opinion polls ==
All major pre-poll surveys predicted BJP's win.

Survey by	BJP	Congress	BSP	Others
India Today Group-ORG Poll	143	78	–	9
ABP News-Dainik Bhaskar-Nielsen	155	65	–	10
CSDS-CNN-IBN-The Week	148–160	52–62	3–7	10–18
Actual Results	165	58	4	3

== List of declared candidates ==
A total of 2,586 candidates filled their nomination for 230 seats spread across 51 districts.

Prominent BJP candidates included former CM Babulal Gaur (Govindpura constituency in Bhopal), Gopal Bhargava (Rehli in Sagar), Kailash Vijayvargiya (Mhow in Indore) and former PM, Atal Bihari Vajpayee’s nephew Anoop Mishra (Bhitarvar in Gwalior).

Prominent Congress candidates included former Union Minister Suresh Pachouri (Bhojpur), leader of the opposition in the assembly Ajay Singh (Churhat), Digvijaya Singh’s son Jaivardhan Singh (Raghogarh), and Sachin Yadav, son of former Deputy CM, Subhash Yadav (Kasravad).

#	Constituency	Congress	Bharatiya Janata Party	Others
001	Sheopur	Brijraj Singh Chouhan	Durgalal Vijay	
002	Vijaypur	Ram Niwas Rawat	Sitaram Aadivashi	
003	Sabalgarh	Suresh Choudhary	Maherban Singh Rawat	
004	Joura	Banwari Lal	Subedar Singh Sikar	
005	Sumawali	Adal Singh Kansana	Satyapal Singh	
006	Morena	Dinesh Gurjar	Rustam Singh	
007	Dimani	Ravindra Singh Tomar Bhidausa	Shivamangal Singh	
008	Ambah	Amarsingh Sakhwar	Banshi Lal Jatav	
009	Ater	Satyadev Katare	Arvind Singh Bhadoriya	
010	Bhind			
011	Lahar	Govind Singh	Rasal Singh	
012	Mehgaon	OPS Bhadoria	Mukesh Singh Chaturvedi	
013	Gohad (SC)	Mewaram Jatav	Lalsingh Arya	
014	Gwalior Rural	Ramsevak Singh (Babuji)	Bharat Singh Kushwaha	
015	Gwalior	Pradyumn Singh Tomar	Jaibhan Singh Pavaia, ex-MP	
016	Gwalior East	Munnalal Goyal	Maya Singh	
017	Gwalior South	Ramesh Goyal	Narain Singh Kushwah	
018	Bhitarwar	Lakhan Singh Yadav	Anoop Mishra	
019	Dabra	Imarti Devi	Suresh Raje	
020	Sewda	Pradeep Aggarwal		
021	Bhander (SC)	Arun Kumar Bharti		
022	Datia		Dr. Narottam Mishra	
023	Karera (SC)	Smt. Shakuntala Khatik	Om Prakash Khatik	
024	Pohari	Hari Vallabh Shukla	Prahlad Bharti	
025	Shivpuri	Yashodhara Raje, MP		
026	Pichhore	K.P. Singh Kakkajoo		
027	Kolaras	Ram Singh	Devendra Jain	
028	Bamori	Mahendra Singh Sisodia		
029	Guna (SC)	Neeraj Nigam	Panna Lal Shakya	
030	Chachoura	Shivnarayan Meena	Mamta Meena	
031	Raghogarh	Radheyshyam Dhakar		
032	Ashok Nagar (SC)	Gopilal Jatav		
033	Chanderi			
034	Mungaoli	Deshraj Singh		
035	Bina (SC)	Nirmala Sapre	Mahesh Rai	
036	Khurai	Arunodaya Choubey	Bhupendra Singh, MP	
037	Surkhi	Govindsingh Rajput	Parul Sahu	
038	Deori	Ratan Singh Silarpur, ex-MLA		
039	Rehli	Gopal Bhargav		
040	Naryoli			
041	Sagar	Shailendra Jain		
042	Banda	Narayan Prajapati		
043	Tikamgarh	Yadvendra Singh	K.K. Srivastava	
044	Jatara (SC)	Harishankar Khatik		
045	Prithvipur	Brajendra Singh	Anita Nayak	
046	Niwari			
047	Khargapur	Rahul Singh		
048	Maharajpur	Mahendra Chaurasiya	Kunwar Manvendra Singh	
049	Chandla (SC)	R.D. Prajapati		
050	Rajnagar	Kunwar Vikram Singh Nati Raja	Dr. Ramkrishna Kushmaria	
051	Chhatarpur	Alok Chaturvedi	Lalita Yadav	
052	Bijawar	Rajesh Shukla	Pushpendra Nath Pathak	
053	Malhara	Tilak Singh Lodhi	Rekha Yadav	
054	Pathariya	Lakhan Patel		
055	Damoh	Jayant Malaiya		
056	Jabera	Pratap Singh	Dashrath Singh	
057	Hatta (SC)			
058	Pawai	Pandit Mukesh Nayak	Brijendra Pratap Singh	
059	Gunnaor (SC)			
060	Panna	Sushree Kushum Mehdele		
061	Chitrakoot	Prem Singh	Surendra Singh Gaharwar	
062	Raigaon (SC)	Pushpraj Bagari		
063	Satna	Rajaram Tripathi	Shankarlal Tiwari	
064	Nagod	Yadvendra Singh	Gagnendra Pratap Singh	
065	Maihar	Narayan Tripathi		
066	Amarpatan	Dr. Rajendra Kumar Singh		
067	Rampur-Baghelan	Kamlendra Singh Kamlu	Harsh Singh	
068	Sirmour	Dr Vivek Tiwari	Divyaraj Singh	
069	Semariya			
070	Teonthar	Ramakant Tiwari		
071	Mauganj	Laxman Tiwari		
072	Deotalab		Girish Goutam	
073	Mangawan (SC)	Trivedi Prasad Maitraiy		
074	Rewa		Rajendra Shukla	
075	Gurh	Nagendra Singh		
076	Churhat	Ajay Arjun Singh	Sarvendu Tiwari	
077	Sidhi	Kamleshwar Dwivedi	Kedarnath Shukla	
078	Sihawal		Vishwamitra Pathak	
079	Chitrangi (ST)	Jagannath Singh		
080	Singrauli	Ramlallu Vaishya		
081	Devsar (SC)	Rajendra Meshram		
082	Dhauhani (ST)	R.D. Singh	Kunwar Singh Tekam	
083	Beohari (ST)	Ram Pal Singh	Ram Prasad Singh Paraste	
084	Jaisingnagar (ST)	Dhyan Singh Marko	Pramila Singh	
085	Jaitpur (ST)	Lallan Singh	Jaisingh Maravi	
086	Kotma	Rajesh Soni		
087	Anuppur (ST)	Bisahulal Singh	Ramlal Rotal	
088	Pushprajgarh (ST)	Phundelal Singh Marko		
089	Bandhavgarh (ST)	Pyarelal Baiga		
090	Manpur (ST)	Sakuntala Pradhan	Meena Singh	
091	Barwara (ST)	Basanth S (Bijay Raghvendra Singh)		
092	Vijayraghavgarh	Sanjay Pathak	Padma Shukla	
093	Murwara			
094	Bahoriband	Dr. Nishith Patel	Prabhat Pandey	
095	Patan	Ajay Vishnoi		
096	Bargi	Suraj Tiwari		
097	Jabalpur Purv (SC)	Lakhan Ghanghoria	Anchal Sonkar	
098	Jabalpur Uttar	Naresh Sarraf	Sharad Jain	
099	Jabalpur Cantt.	Ashok Rohani		
100	Jabalpur Paschim	Tarun Bhanot	Harendra Singh Babbu	
101	Panagar			
102	Sihora (ST)	Jamuna Maravi		
103	Shahpura (ST)	Ganga Bai Ureti	Om Prakash Dhurve	
104	Dindori (SC)	Omkar Singh Markam	Jai Singh Maravi	
105	Bichhiya (ST)	Narayan Singh Patta	Pandit Singh Dhurve	
106	Niwas	Patiram Pandro	Rampyare Kulaste	
107	Mandla	Sanjeev Chhotelal Uike	Sampatia Uike	
108	Baihar	Sanjay Uike	Bhagat Singh Netam	
109	Lanji	Heena Kavre	Ramesh Bhatere	
110	Paraswada	Madhu Bhagat	Ramkishore Kanware	
111	Balaghat	Gourishankar Bisen		
112	Waraseoni	Pradeep Amritlal Jaiswal	Dr. Yogendra Nirmal	
113	Katangi	K.D. Deshmukh, MP		
114	Barghat	Arjun Singh Kakodiya	Kamal Maskule	
115	Seoni	Naresh Diwakar		
116	Keolari	Rajanish Singh	Dr. Dhal Singh Bisen	
117	Lakhnadon	Shashi Thakur		
118	Gotegaon	Narmada Prasad Prajapati		
119	Narsingpur	Sunil Jaiswal		
120	Narsingpur			
121	Gadarwara	Sadhana Sthapak		
122	Junnardeo	Mathan Shah		
123	Amarwara	Kamlesh Pratap Shah		
124	Churai			
125	Saunsar		Nanabhau Mohod	
126	Chhindwara	Deepak Saxena		
127	Parasia	Sohanlal Valmiki	Tarachand Bavariya	
128	Pandhurna	Jatin Uike		
129	Multai	Sukhdeo Panse	Chandrashekhar Deshmukh	
130	Amla	Sunita Bhele	Chetram Manekar	
131	Betul	Hemant Wagdre	Rajeev Khandelwal	
132	Ghoradongri	Sajjan Singh Uike		
133	Bhainsdehi	Dharmu Singh Siryam	Mahenra Singh Chouhan	
134	Timarni	Sanjay Shah		
135	Harda	R.K. Dogne	Kamal Patel	
136	Seoni – Malwa	Hajarilal Raghuwanshi	Sartaj Singh	
137	Hoshangabad	Dr. Sitasharan Sharma		
138	Sohagpur	Vijay Pal Singh		
139	Pipariya	Mamta Nagoatra	Thakur Das Nagvanshi	
140	Udaipura	Bhagwan Singh Rajpoot	Ramkishan Patel	
141	Bhojpur	Surendra Patwa		
142	Sanchi	Dr. Prabhuram Choudhary	Dr. Gauri Shankar Shejwar	
143	Silwani		Rampal Singh	
144	Vidisha	Shashank Bhargav	Kalyan Singh	
145	Basoda	Hari Singh Raghuvanshi		
146	Kurwai	Panbai Panthi	Veer Singh Panwar	
147	Sironj	Laxmikant Sharma		
148	Shamshabad	Jyotsana Yadav	Surya Prakash Meena	
149	Berasia	Mahesh Ratnakar	Vishnu Khatri	
150	Bhopal Uttar	Arif Aqueel	Aarif Beg, ex-MP	
151	Narela, Bhopal	Vishwas Sarang		
152	Bhopal Dakshin-Paschim	Sanjeev Saxena	Umashankar Gupta	
153	Bhopal Madhya			
154	Govindpura	Govind Goyal	Babulal Gaur	
155	Huzur	Jitendra Kumar Daga		
156	Budhni	Shivraj Singh Chouhan, CM		
157	Ashta	Kailash Parmar	Ranjeet Singh Gunwan	
158	Ichhawar	Shailendra Patel	Karan Singh Verma	
159	Sehore	Usha Saxena		
160	Narsinghgarh	Girish Bhandari	Mohan Sharma	
161	Biaora	Govardhan Dangi		
162	Rajgarh	Amar Singh Yadav		
163	Khilchipur	Priyavrat Singh	Kunwar Hajarilal Dangi	
164	Sarangpur	Krishna Mohan Malviya	Kunwar Kothar	
165	Susner	Vallab Bhai Ambavatia		
166	Agar	Madhu Gehlot		
167	Shajapur	Karada Hukum Singh		
168	Shujalpur	Mahendra Joshi	Jaswant Singh Hada	
169	Kalapipal			
170	Sonkatch	Arjun Verma	Rajendra Verma	
171	Dewas	Surekha Verma	Tukojirao Panwar*	
172	Hatpipliya	Thakur Rajendra Singh Baghel	Deepak Joshi	
173	Khategaon	Shyam Holani	Ashish Sharma	
174	Bagali	Ter Singh Devda	Champalal Devda	
175	Mandhata	Lokendra Singh Tomar		
176	Harsud	Surajbhan Singh Solanki	Vijay Shah	
177	Khandwa	Devendra Verma		
178	Pandhana	Nandu Bare		
179	Nepanagar	Ramkishan Patel	Rajendra Dadu	
180	Burhanpur	Archana Chitnish		
181	Bhikangaon	Jhuma Solanki	Nanda Brahmane	
182	Badwah	Rajendra Singh Solanki	Hitendra Singh Solanki	
183	Maheshwar	Sunil Khande	Rajkumar Mev	
184	Kasrawad	Sachin Yadav	Atmaram Patel	
185	Khargone	Ravi Joshi	Balkrishna Patidar	
186	Bhagwanpura	Vijay Singh Solanki	Gajendra Patel	
187	Sendhawa	Antar Singh Arya		
188	Rajpur	Bala Bachchan		
189	Pansemal	Deewan Singh		
190	Badwani	Ramesh Patel	Prem Singh	
191	Alirajpur	Nagar Singh		
192	Jobat	Madhav Singh Dabar		
193	Jhabua			
194	Thandla	Gour Singh Vasuniya		
195	Petlawad	Walsingh Meda	Nirmala Bhuriya	
196	Sardarpur	Pratap Grevval	Vel Singh Bhuriya	
197	Gandhwani	Umang Singhar		
198	Kukshi	Surendra Singh Honey Baghel	Mukam Singh Kirade	
199	Manawar			
200	Dharampuri	Panchilal Meda		
201	Dhar	Neena Verma		
202	Badnawar	Rajvardhan Singh Premsingh	Bhairo Singh Shekhawat	
203	Depalpur	Satynaran Patel	Manoj Patel	
204	Indore – 1	Dipu Yadav	Sudarshan Gupta	
205	Indore – 2	Chhotu Shukla	Ramesh Mendola	
206	Indore – 3	Ashwin Joshi	Usha Thakur	
207	Indore – 4	Suresh Minda	Malini Gaur	
208	Indore – 5	Pankaj Sanghavi	Mahendra Hardia	
209	Dr. Ambedkarnagar (Mhow)	Antar Singh Darbar	Kailash Vijayvargiya	
210	Rau	Jitu Patwari	Jitu Jirati	
211	Sanwer	Tulsiram Silawat	Rajesh Sonkar	
212	Nagada – Khachrod	Dilip Singh Gurjar		
213	Mahidpur	Dr. Kalpana Parulekar	Bahadur Singh	
214	Tarana	Rajendra Malviy	Anil Firojiya	
215	Ghatiya	Ram Lal Malviya	Satish Malaviya	
216	Ujjain Uttar	Vivek Yadav	Paras Jain	
217	Ujjain Dakshin	jai singh	Dr Mohan Yadav	
218	Badnagar			
219	Ratlam Rural	Mathuralal Damar		
220	Ratlam City	Chetanya Kasyap	Aditi Davesar	Himmat Kothari
221	Sailana	Sangeeta Charel		
222	Jaora	Rajendra Pandey		
223	Alot			
224	Mandsaur	Mahendra Singh Gurjar		
225	Malhargarh	Jagdish Deoda		
226	Suwasra			
227	Garoth	Subhash Kumar Sojatia		
228	Manasa	Vijendra Singh Malaheda (Vijju)		
229	Neemuch	Nand Kishor Patel		
230	Jawad	Om Prakash Saklecha		

* = Puar died of cardiac arrest on 20 June 2015.

== Campaign ==
On 10 November, CM Shivraj Singh Chouhan, who won an election from the Budhni seat in 2008, decided to run again from two seats, Budhni and Vidisha.

A large number of rallies took place prior to elections addressed by various local and national level party leaders including BJP's prime ministerial candidate for the forthcoming general election, Narendra Modi and Congress vice president, Rahul Gandhi.

BJP leader and chief ministerial candidate Shivraj Singh Chouhan used 3D Virtual Live Technology to address various rallies simultaneously from one place. This technology was previously used by the then Gujarat Chief Minister, Narendra Modi during 2012 Gujarat legislative assembly election

BJP extensively campaigned on social media including Twitter and Facebook to attract young and first time voters. BJP's mobile app was also released in a view of upcoming state and General Elections on various platforms including Android, iOS, and Symbian.

ECI also made people aware of the newly introduced NOTA button on EVMs.

== Controversies ==
On 5 November, Madhya Pradesh Legislative Assembly speaker and Jabalpur Cantonment MLA, Ishwar Das Rohani died following a heart attack.

Polls were conducted peacefully and no major untoward incident was reported, however, the Election Commission said minor incidents of violence were reported from Bhind and Morena districts.

An assistant poll official in Katni district’s Vijayraghavgarh seat, KB Shrivastava, died of a heart attack while on duty. A case was registered against state minister Ranjana Baghel in Dhar district for allegedly bribing voters.

== Election ==
Voter-verified paper audit trail (VVPAT) along with EVMs was used in 1 assembly seat in Madhya Pradesh elections. There were over 47 million voters were eligible to exercise their Right to Franchise. Polling for the 230-member assembly began at 0800 hours IST and continued till 1700 hours, baring three Naxal-affected seats of Baihar, Paraswada and Lanjhi in Balaghat district where it ended at 1500 hours.

Polling started with a brisk voter turnout reaching only 18% till 1100 hours, however, turnout increased significantly after mid-day and reached 71% by the evening, surpassing the earlier 69.08% turnout recorded during 2008 elections, making it the highest recorded voter turnout in Madhya Pradesh.

== Results ==
Counting of votes started on December 8, 2013 at 0800 hours IST which continued to the later evening. BJP emerged as the winner with 165 seats, followed by Congress and BSP with 58 and four seats respectively. Three independent MLAs also won the polls.

Summary of the 1 December 2013 Madhya Pradesh Legislative Assembly election, 2013 election results
Parties and coalitions	Popular vote			Seats		
Parties and coalitions	Votes	%	±pp	Contested	Won	+/−
Bharatiya Janata Party (BJP)	15,191,335	44.88		230	165	
Indian National Congress (INC)	12,315,253	36.38		229	58	
Bahujan Samaj Party (BSP)	2,128,333	6.29		227	4	▼3
Independents (IND)	1,820,251	5.38		1096	3	
None of the Above (NOTA)	643,171	1.90	▲1.9			
Total	33,852,504	100.00		2813	230	±
Valid votes	33,852,504	99.86				
Invalid votes	47,451	0.14				
Votes cast / turnout	33,900,955	72.69				
Abstentions	12,735,833	27.31				
Registered voters	46,636,788					
Source: Election Commission of India

=== Region-wise break up ===
Region	Seats				
Region	Seats	BJP	INC	IND	BSP
Bagelkhand	22	11	9	0	2
Bhopal	25	19	5	1	0
Bundelkhand	26	19	7	0	0
Gird	34	21	11	0	2
Mahakoshal	46	29	16	1	0
Malwa	50	45	4	1	0
Narmadapuram	11	10	1	0	0
Nimar	16	11	5	0	0
Total	230	165	58	3	4

=== Constituency-wise results ===
#	Constituency	Winner			Runner-up			Margin
#	Constituency	Candidate	Party	Votes	Candidate	Party	Votes	Margin
Sheopur District
1	Sheopur	Durgalal Vijay	BJP	65,211	Babu Jandel	INC	48,784	16,427
2	Vijaypur	Ramniwas Rawat	INC	67,358	Sitaram Adiwashi	BJP	65,209	2,149
Morena District
3	Sabalgarh	Meharban Singh Rawat	BJP	55,950	Lal Singh Kewat	INC	33,446	22,504
4	Joura	Subedar Singh	BJP	42,421	Banwari Lal	INC	39,923	2,498
5	Sumawali	Neetu Satyapal Singh	BJP	61,557	Ajab Singh Kushwah	BSP	47,481	14,076
6	Morena	Rustam Singh	BJP	56,741	Ramprakash	BSP	55,046	1,704
7	Dimani	Balveer Dandotiya	BSP	44,718	Ravindra Singh Tomar	INC	42,612	2,106
8	Ambah (SC)	Satyaprakash Sakhawar	BSP	49,574	Bansi Lal Jatav	BJP	38,286	11,288
Bhind District
9	Ater	Satyadev Katare	INC	45,592	Arvind Singh Bhadoriya	BJP	34,166	11,426
10	Bhind	Narendra Singh Kushwah	BJP	51,170	Sanjeev Singh	BSP	45,177	5,993
11	Lahar	Dr. Govind Singh	INC	53,012	Rasal Singh	BJP	46,739	6,273
12	Mehgaon	Mukesh Singh Chaturvedi	BJP	29,733	O. P. S. Bhadoria	INC	28,460	1,273
13	Gohad (SC)	Lal Singh Arya	BJP	51,711	Mevaram Jatav	INC	31,897	19,814
Gwalior District
14	Gwalior Rural	Bharat Singh Kushwah	BJP	47,944	Ram Sevak Singh	INC	36,006	11,938
15	Gwalior	Jaibhan Singh Pawaiya	BJP	74,769	Pradhumn Singh Tomar	INC	59,208	15,561
16	Gwalior East	Maya Singh	BJP	59,824	Munnalal Goyal	INC	58,677	1,147
17	Gwalior South	Narayan Singh Kushwah	BJP	68,627	Ramesh Agarwal	INC	52,360	16,267
18	Bhitarwar	Lakhan Singh Yadav	INC	40,578	Anoop Mishra	BJP	34,030	6,548
19	Dabra (SC)	Imarti Devi	INC	67,764	Suresh Raje	BJP	34,486	33,278
Datia District
20	Sewda	Pradeep Agarwal	BJP	32,423	Ghanshyam Singh	INC	23,614	8,809
21	Bhander (SC)	Ghanshyam Pironiya	BJP	36,878	Arun Kumar	INC	29,227	7,651
22	Datia	Dr. Narottam Mishra	BJP	57,438	Rajendra Bharti	INC	45,357	12,081
Shivpuri District
23	Karera (SC)	Shakuntla Khatik	INC	59,371	Rajkumar Omprakash Khatik	BJP	49,051	10,320
24	Pohari	Prahlad Bharti	BJP	53,068	Harivallabh Shukla	INC	49,443	3,625
25	Shivpuri	Yashodhara Raje Scindia	BJP	76,330	Birendra Raghuvanshi	INC	65,185	11,145
26	Pichhore	K. P. Singh	INC	78,995	Preetam Lodhi	BJP	71,882	7,113
27	Kolaras	Ram Singh Yadav	INC	73,942	Devendra Kumar Jain	BJP	48,989	24,953
Guna District
28	Bamori	Mahendra Singh Sisodia	INC	71,084	Kanhaiya Lal Agarwal	BJP	53,243	18,561
29	Guna (SC)	Pannalal Shakya	BJP	81,444	Neeraj Nigam	INC	36,333	45,111
30	Chachoura	Mamta Meena	BJP	82,779	Shivnarayan Meena	INC	47,878	34,901
31	Raghogarh	Jaivardhan Singh	INC	98,041	Radhe Shyam Dhakad	BJP	39,837	58,204
Ashoknagar District
32	Ashok Nagar (SC)	Gopilal Jatav	BJP	55,978	Jajpal Singh Jajji	INC	52,628	3,348
33	Chanderi	Gopal Singh Chauhan	INC	73,484	Rajkumar Singh Yadav	BJP	43,166	30,318
34	Mungaoli	Mahendra Singh Kalukheda	INC	70,675	Rao Deshraj Singh	BJP	49,910	20,765
Sagar District
35	Bina (SC)	Mahesh Rai	BJP	61,356	Nirmala Sapre	INC	42,587	18,769
36	Khurai	Bhupendra Bhaiya	BJP	62,127	Arunodaya Chaubey	INC	56,043	6,084
37	Surkhi	Parul Sahu Kesari	BJP	59,513	Govind Singh Rajput	INC	59,372	141
38	Deori	Harsh Yadav	INC	71,185	Ratansingh Silarpur	BJP	49,105	22,080
39	Rehli	Gopal Bhargava	BJP	101,899	Brijbihari Pateriya	INC	50,134	51,765
40	Naryoli (SC)	Pradeep Lariya	BJP	69,195	Surendra Chaudhary	INC	53,148	16,046
41	Sagar	Shailendra Jain	BJP	64,351	Sushil Tiwari	INC	56,128	8,223
42	Banda	Harvansh Singh Rathore	BJP	66,203	Narayan Prajapati	INC	48,323	17,880
Tikamgarh District
43	Tikamgarh	K K Shrivastava	BJP	57,968	Yadvendra Singh	INC	41,079	16,889
44	Jatara (SC)	Ahirwar Dinesh Kumar	INC	51,149	Harishankar Khatik	BJP	50,916	233
45	Prithvipur	Anita Sunil Nayak	BJP	51,147	Brajendra Singh Rathore	INC	42,520	8,627
Niwari District
46	Niwari	Anil Jain	BJP	60,395	Meera Deepak Yadav	SP	33,186	27,209
Tikamgarh District
47	Khargapur	Surendra Singh Gaur	INC	59,771	Rahul Singh Lodhi	BJP	54,094	5,677
Chhatarpur District
48	Maharajpur	Manavendra Singh	BJP	45,816	Rakesh Pathak	INC	30,095	15,721
49	Chandla (SC)	Rajesh Kumar Prajapati	BJP	65,959	Anurag Hariprasad	INC	28,562	37,937
50	Rajnagar	Vikram Singh	INC	54,643	Ramkrishn Kusumariya	BJP	46,036	8,607
51	Chhatarpur	Lalita Yadav	BJP	44,623	Alok Chaturvedi	INC	42,406	2,217
52	Bijawar	Pueshpendra Nath Pathak	BJP	50,576	Rajesh Shukla	INC	40,197	10,379
53	Malhara	Rekha Yadav Ahir	BJP	41,779	Tilak Singh Lodhi	INC	40,265	1,514
Damoh District
54	Pathariya	Lakhan Patel	BJP	60,083	Kunvar Pushpendra Singh	INC	52,738	7,315
55	Damoh	Jayant Malaiya	BJP	72,534	Chandrabhan Bhaiya	INC	67,581	4,963
56	Jabera	Pratap Singh	INC	68,511	Pratap Singh	BJP	56,615	11,896
57	Hatta (SC)	Umadevi Lalchand Khathik	BJP	59,231	Harishankar Choudhri	INC	56,379	2,852
Panna District
58	Pawai	Pandit Mukesh Nayak	INC	78,949	Brijendra Pratap Singh	BJP	67,254	11,695
59	Gunnaor (SC)	[Mahendra Singh	BJP	41,980	Shiv Dayal	INC	40,643	1,337
60	Panna	Kusum Singh Mahdele	BJP	54,778	Mahendra Pal Verma	BSP	25,742	29,036
Satna District
61	Chitrakoot	Prem Singh	INC	45,913	Surendra Singh Gaharwar	BJP	34,943	10,970
62	Raigaon (SC)	Usha Choudhary	BSP	42,610	Pushpraj Bagri	BJP	38,501	4,109
63	Satna	Shankarlal Tiwari	BJP	56,160	Rajaram Tripathi	INC	40,828	15,332
64	Nagod	Yadvendra Singh	INC	55,837	Gaganendra Pratap Singh	BJP	45,815	10,064
65	Maihar	Narayan Prasad	INC	48,306	Ramesh Prasad	BJP	41,331	6,975
66	Amarpatan	Rajendra Kumar Singh	INC	48,341	Ramkhelawan Patel	BJP	36,602	11,739
67	Rampur-Baghelan	Harsh Singh	BJP	71,818	Ramlakhan Singh Patel	BSP	47,563	24,255
Rewa District
68	Sirmour	Divyaraj Singh	BJP	40,018	Vivek Tiwari	INC	34,730	5,288
69	Semariya	Neelam Abhey Mishra	BJP	36,173	Pankaj Singh	BSP	30,196	5,977
70	Teonthar	Ramakant Tiwari	BJP	44,347	Ramshankar Singh	INC	34,590	9,757
71	Mauganj	Sukhendra Singh	INC	38,898	Laxman Tiwari	BJP	28,132	10,766
72	Deotalab	Girish Gautam	BJP	36,495	Vidhya Wati Patel	BSP	32,610	3,885
73	Mangawan (SC)	Panchu Lal Prajapati	BSP	40,349	Pannabai Prajapati	BJP	40,074	275
74	Rewa	Rajendra Shukla	BJP	61,502	Krishna Kumar Gupta	BSP	23,956	37,546
75	Gurh	Sundar Lal Tiwari	INC	33,741	Nagendra Singh	BJP	32,359	1,382
Sidhi District
76	Churhat	Ajay Arun Singh	INC	71,796	Sharadendu Tiwari	BJP	52,440	19,356
77	Sidhi	Kedar Nath Shukla	BJP	53,115	Kamaleshwar Prasad Dwivedi	INC	50,755	2,360
78	Sihawal	Kamleshwar Patel	INC	72,928	Vishwamitra Pathak	BJP	40,372	32,556
Singrauli District
79	Chitrangi (ST)	Saraswati Singh	INC	57,466	Jagannath Singh	INC	47,621	9,845
80	Singrauli	Ramlallu Vaishya	BJP	48,293	Bhuvneshwar Prasad Singh	INC	37,733	10,560
81	Devsar (SC)	Rajendra Meshram	BJP	64,217	Banshmani Prasad Verma	Independent	31,003	33,214
Sidhi District
82	Dhauhani (ST)	Kunwar Singh Tekam	BJP	60,130	Tilakraj Singh Uike	INC	41,129	19,001
Shahdol District
83	Beohari (ST)	Ram Pal Singh	INC	74,710	Ram Prasad Singh	BJP	57,368	17,342
84	Jaisingnagar (ST)	Pramila Singh	BJP	74,156	Dhyam Singh Marko	INC	60,193	13,963
85	Jaitpur (ST)	Jai Singh Maravi	BJP	65,856	Lalan Singh	INC	54,650	11,206
Anuppur District
86	Kotma	Manoj Kumar Agarwal	INC	38,319	Rajesh Soni	BJP	36,773	1,546
87	Anuppur (ST)	Ramlal Rautel	BJP	57,438	Bisahulal Singh	INC	45,693	11,745
88	Pushprajgarh (ST)	Phundelal Singh Marko	INC	69,192	Narendra Singh Maravi	BJP	33,545	35,647
Umaria District
89	Bandhavgarh (ST)	Gyan Singh	BJP	66,881	Pyrelal Baiga	INC	48,236	18,465
90	Manpur (ST)	Meena Singh	BJP	70,024	Gyanvati Singh	INC	26,396	43,628
Katni District
91	Barwara (ST)	Moti Kashyap	BJP	62,292	Vijayraghvendra Singh	INC	59,005	3,287
92	Vijayraghavgarh	Sanjay Pathak	INC	60,719	Padma Shukla	BJP	59,790	929
93	Murwara	Sandip Shree Prasad Jaiswal	BJP	87,396	Feroz Ahmad	INC	40,258	47,138
94	Bahoriband	Prabhat Pandey	BJP	54,504	Kunwar Nishith Patel	INC	33,586	20,918
Jabalpur District
95	Patan	Neelesh Awasthi	INC	85,538	Ajay Vishnoi	BJP	72,802	12,736
96	Bargi	Suraj Tiwari	BJP	69,076	Sobran Singh Thakur	INC	61,677	7,399
97	Jabalpur East (SC)	Anchal Sonkar	BJP	67,167	Lakhan Ghanghoriya	INC	66,012	1,155
98	Jabalpur North	Sharad Jain	BJP	74,656	Naresh Saraf	INC	41,093	33,563
99	Jabalpur Cantonment	Ashok Rohani	BJP	83,676	Sarveshwar Shrivastava	INC	29,935	53,741
100	Jabalpur West	Tarun Bhanot	INC	62,668	Harendrajeet Singh	BJP	61,745	923
101	Panagar	Sushil Kumar Tiwari	BJP	82,358	Rupendra Patel	INC	54,404	27,954
102	Sihora (ST)	Nandhani Maravi	BJP	63,931	Khiladi Singh Aamro	INC	48,927	15,004
Dindori District
103	Shahpura (ST)	Omprakash Dhurwe	BJP	76,796	Ganga Bai	INC	44,115	32,681
104	Dindori (ST)	Omkar Singh Markam	INC	76,866	Jay Singh Maravi	BJP	70,478	6,388
Mandla District
105	Bichhiya (ST)	Pandit Singh Dhruw	BJP	65,836	Narayan Singh Patta	INC	47,520	18,316
106	Niwas (ST)	Rampyare Kulaste	BJP	65,916	Paitiram Pandro	INC	55,006	10,910
107	Mandla (ST)	Sanjeev Chhotelal Uikey	INC	80,066	Sampatiya Uikey	BJP	76,239	3,827
Balaghat District
108	Baihar (ST)	Sanjay Uikey	INC	82,419	Bhagat Singh Netam	BJP	50,067	32,352
109	Lanji	Hina Kaware	INC	79,068	Ramesh Bhatere	BJP	47,318	31,750
110	Paraswada	Madhu Bhagat	INC	49,216	Ram Kishor Nano Kawre	BJP	46,367	2,849
111	Balaghat	Gaurishankar Bisen	BJP	71,993	Anubha Munjare	SP	69,493	2,500
112	Waraseoni	Dr. Yogendra Nirmal	BJP	66,806	Pradeep Jaiswal	INC	48,868	17,938
113	Katangi	K. D. Deshmukh	BJP	57,230	Udaysingh Guruji	BSP	37,280	19,950
Seoni District
114	Barghat (ST)	Kamal Marskole	BJP	77,122	Arjun Singh Kakodiya	INC	76,853	269
115	Seoni	Dinesh Rai Munmun	Independent	65,402	Naresh Diwakar	BJP	44,486	20,916
116	Keolari	Rajneesh Harivansh Singh	INC	72,669	Dr. Dhal Singh Bisen	BJP	67,886	4,803
117	Lakhnadon (ST)	Yogendra Singh	INC	77,928	Shashi Thakur	BJP	65,147	12,781
Narsinghpur District
118	Gotegaon (SC)	Kailash Jatav	BJP	74,759	N. P. Prajapati	INC	54,588	20,171
119	Narsingpur	Jalam Singh Patel	BJP	89,921	Sunil Jaiswal	INC	41,440	48,481
120	Tendukheda	Sanjay Sharma	BJP	81,938	Surendra Dhimole	INC	37,336	44,602
121	Gadarwara	Govind Singh Patel	BJP	61,202	Suneeta Patel	INC	35,889	25,313
Chhindwara District
122	Junnardeo (ST)	Nathan Shah Kevreti	BJP	74,319	Sunil Uikey	INC	54,198	20,121
123	Amarwara (ST)	Kamlesh Pratap Shah	INC	55,684	Uttam Premnarayan Thakur	BJP	51,621	4,063
124	Chourai	Pandit Ramesh Dubey	BJP	70,810	Choudhary Gambheer Singh	INC	57,179	13,631
125	Saunsar	Nanabhau Mohod	BJP	69,257	Bhagvat Mahajan	INC	60,841	8,416
126	Chhindwara	Chandrabhan Singh Chaudhary	BJP	97,769	Deepak Saxena	BJP	72,991	24,778
127	Parasia (SC)	Sohanlal Balmik	INC	72,235	Tarachand Bawaria	BJP	65,373	6,862
128	Pandhurna (ST)	Jatan Uikey	INC	61,741	Tikaram Korachi	BJP	60,263	1,478
Betul District
129	Multai	Chandrashekhar Desmukh	BJP	84,354	Sukhdev Panse	INC	52,485	31,869
130	Amla (SC)	Chaitram Manekar	BJP	77,939	Sunita Bele	INC	38,337	39,602
131	Betul	Hemant Vijay Khandelwal	BJP	82,949	Hemant Wagadre	INC	58,602	24,347
132	Ghoradongri (ST)	Sajjan Singh Uikey	BJP	77,793	Brahma	INC	69,709	8,084
133	Bhainsdehi (ST)	Mahendra Singh Chauhan	BJP	77,912	Dharmu Singh Sirsam	INC	64,642	13,276
Harda District
134	Timarni (ST)	Sanjay Shah	BJP	62,502	Ramesh Radhelal Ivne	INC	45,995	16,507
135	Harda	Dr. Ramkishore Dogne	INC	74,607	Kamal Patel	BJP	69,956	4,651
Hoshangabad District
136	Seoni-Malwa	Sartaj Singh	BJP	78,374	Hajari Lal Raghuvanshi	INC	65,827	12,527
137	Hoshangabad	Dr. Sitasaran Sharma	BJP	91,760	Ravi Kishor Jaiswal	INC	42,464	49,296
138	Sohagpur	Vijaypal Singh	BJP	92,859	Ranveer Singh Galcha	INC	63,968	28,891
139	Pipariya (SC)	Thakurdas Nagwanshi	BJP	91,026	Mamta Manoj Nagotra	INC	40,049	51,157
Raisen District
140	Udaipura	Ramkishan Patel	BJP	90,950	Bhagwan Singh Rajput	INC	46,897	44,053
141	Bhojpur	Surendra Patwa	BJP	80,491	Suresh Pachouri	INC	60,342	20,149
142	Sanchi (SC)	Dr. Gourishankar Shejwar	BJP	85,599	Dr. Prabhuram Choudhary	INC	64,663	20,936
143	Silwani	Rampal Singh	BJP	68,926	Devendra Patel	INC	51,848	17,078
Vidisha District
144	Vidisha	Shivraj Singh Chouhan	BJP	73,783	Shashank Bhargava	INC	56,817	16,966
145	Basoda	Nishank Kumar Jain	INC	68,002	Harisingh Raghuvanshi	BJP	51,843	16,159
146	Kurwai (SC)	Veersingh Panwar	BJP	65,003	Pan Bai Panthi	INC	60,922	4,081
147	Sironj	Govardhan Lal	INC	65,297	Laxmikant Sharma	BJP	63,713	1,584
148	Shamshabad	Surya Prakash Meena	BJP	54,233	Jyotsna Yadav	INC	51,075	3,158
Bhopal District
149	Berasia (SC)	Vishnu Khatri	BJP	76,657	Mahesh Ratnakar	INC	47,353	29,304
150	Bhopal Uttar	Arif Aqueel	INC	73,070	Arif Baig	BJP	66,406	6,664
151	Narela	Vishvas Sarang	BJP	98,472	Sunil Sood	INC	71,502	26,970
152	Bhopal Dakshin-Paschim	Umashankar Gupta	BJP	71,167	Sanjeev Saxena	INC	52,969	18,198
153	Bhopal Madhya	Surendra Nath Singh	BJP	70,696	Arif Masood	INC	63,715	6,981
154	Govindpura	Babulal Gaur	BJP	116,586	Govind Goyal	INC	45,942	70,644
155	Huzur	Rameshwar Sharma	BJP	108,994	Rajendra Mandloi	INC	49,390	59,604
Sehore District
156	Budhni	Shivraj Singh Chouhan	BJP	128,730	Mahendra Singh Chauhan	INC	43,925	84,805
157	Ashta (SC)	Ranjeet Singh Gunwan	BJP	84,252	Gopal Singh Engineer	INC	78,748	5,504
158	Ichhawar	Shailendra Patel	INC	74,704	Karan Singh Verma	BJP	73,960	744
159	Sehore	Sudesh Rai	Independent	63,604	Usha Ramesh Saxena	BJP	61,978	1,626
Rajgarh District
160	Narsinghgarh	Girish Bhandari	INC	85,847	Mohan Sharma	BJP	62,829	23,018
161	Biaora	Narayan Singh Panwar	BJP	75,766	Ram Chandra Dangi	INC	72,678	3,088
162	Rajgarh	Amar Singh Yadav	BJP	97,735	Shivsingh Bamlabe	INC	46,524	51,211
163	Khilchipur	Kunwar Hajarilal Dangi	BJP	82,712	Priyavrat Singh	INC	71,233	11,479
164	Sarangpur (SC)	Kunwarji Kothar	BJP	73,108	Krishan Mohan Malviya	INC	54,995	18,113
Agar Malwa District
165	Susner	Murlidhar Patidar	BJP	79,018	Ambavitya Vallabh Bhai	INC	51,342	27,676
166	Agar (SC)	Manohar Untwal	BJP	83,726	Madhav Singh	INC	54,867	28,859
Shajapur District
167	Shajapur	Arun Bhimawad	BJP	76,911	Hukum Singh Karada	INC	74,973	1,938
168	Shujalpur	Jaswantsingh Hada	BJP	56,637	Mahendra Joshi	BJP	47,981	8,656
169	Kalapipal	Inder Singh Parmar	BJP	75,330	Kedarsingh Mandloi	INC	65,757	9,573
Dewas District
170	Sonkatch (SC)	Rajendra Phulachand Verma	BJP	72,644	Arjun Verma	INC	70,764	1,880
171	Dewas	Tukoji Rao Pawar	BJP	100,660	Rekha Verma	INC	50,541	50,119
172	Hatpipliya	Deepak Kailash Joshi	BJP	68,824	Rajendra Singh Baghel	BJP	62,649	6,175
173	Khategaon	Aashish Govind Sharma	BJP	79,968	Shyam Holani	INC	58,251	21,717
174	Bagli (ST)	Champalal Devda	BJP	87,580	Tersingh Devda	INC	62,248	25,332
Khandwa District
175	Mandhata	Lokendra Singh Tomar	BJP	65,327	Narayan Patel	INC	60,990	4,337
176	Harsud (ST)	Kunwar Vijay Shah	BJP	73,880	Surajbhanu Solanki	INC	30,309	43,571
177	Khandwa (SC)	Devendra Verma	BJP	89,074	Mohan Dhakase	INC	55,033	34,071
178	Pandhana (ST)	Yogita Navalsing Broker	BJP	89,732	Nandu Bhare	INC	72,471	17,261
Burhanpur District
179	Nepanagar (ST)	Rajendra Shyamlal Dadu	BJP	87,224	Ramkishan Patel	INC	65,046	22,178
180	Burhanpur	Archana Didi	BJP	104,426	Ajay Raghuvanshi	INC	81,599	22,827
Khargone District
181	Bhikangaon (ST)	Jhuma Solanki	INC	72,060	Nanda Brahamne	BJP	69,661	2,399
182	Barwah	Hitendra Singh Solanki	BJP	67,600	Sachin Birla	Independent	61,970	5,630
183	Maheshwar (SC)	Rajkumar Mev	BJP	74,320	Sunil Khande	INC	69,593	4,727
184	Kasrawad	Sachin Yadav	INC	79,865	Atmaram Patel	BJP	67,880	11,805
185	Khargone	Balikrishan Patidar	BJP	74,519	Ravi Joshi	INC	67,694	6,825
186	Bhagwanpura (ST)	Vijay Singh	INC	67,251	Gajengra Singh	BJP	65,431	1,820
Barwani District
187	Sendhawa (ST)	Antarsingh Arya	BJP	88,821	Dayaram Patel	INC	63,165	25,686
188	Rajpur (ST)	Bala Bachchan	INC	82,167	Antersingh Devisingh Patel	BJP	70,971	11,196
189	Pansemal (ST)	Viththal Patel	BJP	77,919	Chandrabhaga Kirade	INC	70,537	7,382
190	Barwani (ST)	Ramesh Patel	INC	77,761	Premsingh Patel	BJP	67,234	10,527
Alirajpur District
191	Alirajpur (ST)	Nagar Singh Chouhan	BJP	68,501	Mahesh Patel Sena	INC	51,132	17,369
192	Jobat (ST)	Madhosingh Dawar	BJP	45,793	Vishal Rawat	INC	34,742	11,051
Jhabua District
193	Jhabua (ST)	Shantilal Bilwal	BJP	56,587	Jeviyar Meda	INC	40,729	15,858
194	Thandla (ST)	Kalsingh Bhabar	Independent	63,665	Gendal Damor	INC	58,549	5,116
195	Petlawad (ST)	Nirmala Dilipsingh Bhuriya	BJP	80,384	Val Singh Maida	INC	63,368	17,016
Dhar District
196	Sardarpur (ST)	Welsingh Bhuriya	BJP	60,192	Pratap Grewal	INC	59,663	529
197	Gandhwani (ST)	Umang Singhar	INC	66,760	Sardarsingh Medha	BJP	54,434	12,326
198	Kukshi (ST)	Surendra Singh Baghel	INC	89,111	Mukamsingh Kirade	BJP	46,343	42,768
199	Manawar (ST)	Ranjana Baghel	BJP	55,293	Niranjan Dawar Loni	INC	53,654	1,639
200	Dharampuri (ST)	Kalusingh Thakur	BJP	65,069	Panchilal Meda	INC	57,496	7,573
201	Dhar	Neena Vikram Verma	BJP	85,624	Prabha Balamkundsingh	INC	74,142	11,482
202	Badnawar	Bhanwar Singh Shekhawat	BJP	84,499	Rajvardhan Singh Dattigaon	INC	42,993	41,506
Indore District
203	Depalpur	Manoj Nirbhaysingh	BJP	93,264	Satyanarayan Patel	INC	63,067	30,197
204	Indore-1	Sudarshan Gupta	BJP	99,558	Kamlesh Khandelwal	Independent	45,382	54,156
205	Indore-2	Ramesh Mendola	BJP	133,669	Chhotu Shukla	INC	42,652	91,017
206	Indore-3	Usha Thakur	BJP	68,334	Ashwin Joshi	INC	55,016	13,318
207	Indore-4	Malini Gaur	BJP	91,998	Suresh Minda	INC	58,175	33,823
208	Indore-5	Mahendra Hardia	BJP	106,111	Pankaj Sanghvi	INC	91,693	14,418
209	Dr. Ambedkar Nagar-Mhow	Kailash Vijayvargiya	BJP	89,848	Antar Singh Darbar	INC	77,632	12,216
210	Rau	Jitu Patwari	INC	91,885	Jeetu Jirati	BJP	73,326	18,559
211	Sanwer	Dr. Rajesh Sonkar	BJP	87,292	Tulsi Silawat	INC	69,509	17,583
Ujjain District
212	Nagda-Khachrod	Dilip Singh Shekhawat	BJP	78,036	Dilip Gurjar	INC	61,921	16,115
213	Mahidpur	Bahadursingh Chouhan	BJP	71,096	Dinesh Jain	Independent	50,462	20,634
214	Tarana (SC)	Anil Firojiya	BJP	64,792	Rajendra Radhakishan Malviya	INC	48,657	16,135
215	Ghatiya (SC)	Satish Malviya	BJP	74,092	Ramlal Malviya	INC	56,723	17,639
216	Ujjain North	Paras Chandra Jain	BJP	72,815	Vivek Jagdish Yadav	INC	47,966	24,849
217	Ujjain South	Dr. Mohan Yadav	BJP	73,108	Jaysingh Darbar	INC	63,456	9,652
218	Badnagar	Mukesh Pandya	BJP	58,679	Sanjay Sharma	INC	45,544	13,135
Ratlam District
219	Ratlam Rural (ST)	Mathura Lal	BJP	77,367	Laxmi Devi Kharadi	INC	50,398	26,969
220	Ratlam City	Chetanya Kasyap	BJP	76,184	Adity Dawesar	INC	35,879	40,305
221	Sailana (ST)	Sangeeta Vijay Charel	BJP	47,662	Harshvijay Gehlot	INC	45,183	2,079
222	Jaora	Rajendra Pandey	BJP	89,656	Kadpa Yusuf	INC	59,805	29,851
223	Alot (SC)	Jitendra Thawarchand	BJP	80,821	Ajit Premchand	INC	65,476	7,973
Mandsaur District
224	Mandsour	Yashpal Singh Sisodia	BJP	84,975	Mahendra Singh Gurjar	INC	60,680	24,295
225	Malhargarh (SC)	Jagdish Dewda	BJP	86,857	Shyamlal Jokchand	INC	80,286	6,571
226	Suwasra	Hardeep Singh Dang	INC	87,517	Radheshyam Nanelal Patidar	BJP	80,392	7,125
227	Garoth	Rajesh Yadav	BJP	88,525	Subhash Kumar Sojata	INC	62,770	25,755
Neemuch District
228	Manasa	Kailash Chandra	BJP	55,852	Vijendra Singh	INC	41,824	14,028
229	Neemuch	Dilip Singh Parihar	BJP	73,320	Nandkishor Patel	INC	51,653	21,667
230	Jawad	Om Prakash Sakhlecha	BJP	56,154	Rajkumar Rameshchandra	Independent	42,503	13,651

== Bypolls (2013-2018) ==
S.No	Date	Constituency	MLA before election	Party before election	Elected MLA	Party after election
134	24 April 2014	Vidisha	Shivraj Singh Chouhan	Bharatiya Janata Party	Kalyan Singh Thakur	Bharatiya Janata Party
94	21 August 2014	Bahoriband	Prabhat Pandey	Bharatiya Janata Party	Saurabh Singh	Indian National Congress
166	21 August 2014	Agar	Manohar Untwal	Bharatiya Janata Party	Gopal Parmar	Bharatiya Janata Party
92	21 August 2014	Vijayraghavgarh	Sanjay Pathak	Indian National Congress	Sanjay Pathak	Bharatiya Janata Party
227	27 June 2015	Garoth	Rajesh Yadav	Bharatiya Janata Party	Chander Singh Sisodia	Bharatiya Janata Party
65	13 February 2016	Maihar	Narayan Prasad	Indian National Congress	Narayan Tripathi	Bharatiya Janata Party
132	30 May 2016	Ghoradongri	Sajjan Singh Uikey	Bharatiya Janata Party	Mangal Singh Dhruve	Bharatiya Janata Party
179	19 November 2016	Nepanagar	Rajendra Shyamlal Dadu	Bharatiya Janata Party	Manju Rajendra Dadu	Bharatiya Janata Party
89	9 April 2017	Bandhavgarh	Gyan Singh	Bharatiya Janata Party	Shiv Narayan Singh	Bharatiya Janata Party
9	9 April 2017	Ater	Satyadev Katare	Indian National Congress	Hemant Katare	Indian National Congress
61	9 November 2017	Chitrakoot	Prem Singh	Indian National Congress	Neelanshu Chaturvedi	Indian National Congress
27	24 February 2018	Kolaras	Ram Singh Yadav	Indian National Congress	Mahendra Singh Yadav	Indian National Congress
34	24 February 2018	Mungaoli	Mahendra Singh Kalukheda	Indian National Congress	Brajendra Singh Yadav	Indian National Congress

== See also ==
- 2013 elections in India
