= Narela (disambiguation) =

Narela is a sub-district of Delhi, India.

It could also refer to the following places in India:

- Narela, a Suburb and a Tehsil of Delhi
- Narela, Delhi Assembly constituency (sometimes called Nerala), Delhi Legislative Assembly constituency centered around the above sub-district
- Narela metro station, of the Delhi Metro in the sub-district
- Narela railway station, in the sub-district
- Narela Bazyaft, a village in Madhya Pradesh, India
- Narela Bazyafth, a village in Madhya Pradesh, India
- Narela, Bhopal, a village in Madhya Pradesh, India
  - Narela, Madhya Pradesh Assembly constituency, constituency of the Madhya Pradesh Legislative Assembly
- Narela Damodar, a village in Madhya Pradesh, India
- Narela Hanumant Singh, a village in Madhya Pradesh, India

== See also ==
- Narelle (disambiguation)
- Nareli Jain Temple, Jain temple in Ajmer, Rajasthan, India
