= Keolari Assembly constituency =

Constituency of the Madhya Pradesh legislative assembly in India

Coordinates: 22.37°N 79.92°E

Keolari
- Constituency No. 116 for the Madhya Pradesh Legislative Assembly

Constituency details
- Country: India
- Region: Central India
- State: Madhya Pradesh
- District: Seoni
- Lok Sabha constituency: Mandla
- Established: 1967
- Reservation: None

Member of Legislative Assembly
- 16th Madhya Pradesh Legislative Assembly
- Incumbent Rajneesh Harvansh Singh
- Party: Indian National Congress
- Elected year: 2023
- Preceded by: Rakesh Pal Singh

Keolari Assembly constituency is one of the 230 Vidhan Sabha (Legislative Assembly) constituencies of Madhya Pradesh state in central India.

It is part of Seoni district.

== Members of Legislative Assembly ==
Election	Name	Party
1967	Vimla K. P. Verma	Indian National Congress
1972	Vimla K. P. Verma	Indian National Congress
1977	Vimla K. P. Verma	Indian National Congress
1980	Vimla K. P. Verma	Indian National Congress (Indira)
1985	Vimla K. P. Verma	Indian National Congress
1990	Neha Singh	Bharatiya Janata Party
1993	Harvansh Singh	Indian National Congress
1998	Harvansh Singh	Indian National Congress
2003	Harvansh Singh	Indian National Congress
2008	Harvansh Singh	Indian National Congress
2013	Rajneesh Harvansh Singh	Indian National Congress
2018	Rakesh Pal Singh	Bharatiya Janta Party
2023	Rajneesh Harvansh Singh	Indian National Congress

== Election results ==
=== 2023 ===
2023 Madhya Pradesh Legislative Assembly election: Keolari
Party	Candidate	Votes	%	±%
INC	Rajneesh Harvansh Singh	122,814	53.2	+13.44
BJP	Rakesh Pal Singh	89,054	38.58	−4.53
Independent	Preetam Uikey	11,639	5.04	
NOTA	None of the above	2,492	1.08	+0.01
Majority		33,760	14.62	+11.27
Turnout		230,858	88.64	+4.3
INC gain from BJP		Swing		

=== 2018 ===
2018 Madhya Pradesh Legislative Assembly election: Keolari
Party	Candidate	Votes	%	±%
BJP	Rakesh Pal Singh	85,839	43.11	
INC	Rajneesh Harvansh Singh	79,160	39.76	
GGP	Rajendra Rai	21,694	10.9	
Independent	Sheakh Mustufa (Ehsan) Ansari	2,014	1.01	
Independent	Swarn Rekha	1,790	0.9	
NOTA	None of the above	2,125	1.07	
Majority		6,679	3.35	
Turnout		199,096	84.34	
BJP hold		Swing		

== See also ==
- Keolari
