= Satish Malviya =

Indian politician

Satish Malviya (born 1982) is an Indian politician from Madhya Pradesh. He is a two-time MLA from Ghatiya Assembly constituency, which is reserved for Scheduled Caste community, in Ujjain District. He won the 2023 Madhya Pradesh Legislative Assembly election, representing the Bharatiya Janata Party.

== Early life and education ==
Malviya is from Ghatiya, Ujjain District, Madhya Pradesh. He is the son of Nagulalji Malviya. He completed his B.A. in 2010 at a college affiliated with Madhya Pradesh Bhoj University, Bhopal.

== Career ==
Malviya won from Ghatiya Assembly constituency representing Bharatiya Janata Party in the 2023 Madhya Pradesh Legislative Assembly election. He polled 96,236 votes and defeated his nearest rival, Ramlal Malviya of the Indian National Congress, by a margin of 17,666 votes. He first became an MLA winning the 2013 Madhya Pradesh Legislative Assembly election defeating Ramlal Malviya by a margin of 17,639 votes. Ramlal, however, won in the 2018 Assembly election but again lost to the same BJP candidate Dr Satish Malviya in 2023.
