= Shekhar Choudhary =

Indian politician

Member of Legislative Assembly

Personal details
- Born: Jabalpur, Madhya Pradesh, India
- Party: Indian National Congress
- Parent: Narayan Prasad Chaudhary (father)
- Occupation: Politician, social activist
- Known for: MLA
- His father Narayan Prasad Chaudhary was founding member of Akhil Bhartiya Khatik Samaj

Shekhar Choudhary is an Indian politician and member of Indian National Congress party. He represented Gotegaon Vidhan Sabha. Previously he was the member of Bharatiya Janata Party and fought election from same constituency in 2008.

== Early life ==
He was born in Jabalpur, his father's name is late Shri Narayan Prasad Chaudhary was MLA from Patan (Madhya Pradesh Vidhan Sabha constituency) and has been Rajya Sabha member twice.
