= Rajneesh Harvansh Singh =

Indian politician

Rajneesh Harvansh Singh MLA

Member of the Madhya Pradesh Legislative Assembly
- Incumbent
- Assumed office 25 November 2013
- Preceded by: Harvansh Singh
- Constituency: Keolari

Personal details
- Born: 15 September 1970 (age 56) Seora, Madhya Pradesh
- Party: Indian National Congress
- Spouse: Neetu Singh
- Parent: Harvansh Singh (father)
- Education: LNCT Bhopal
- Profession: Politician
- Source: ["Biography:Singh, Rajneesh Harvansh" (PDF). Madhya Pradesh Legislative Assembly.]

Rajneesh Harvansh Singh MLA (born 15 September 1970) is an Indian politician who serves as the member for the constituency of Keolari in the Madhya Pradesh Legislative Assembly.

== Political career ==
He became an MLA in 2013, succeeding his father, Harvansh Singh.

== Personal life ==
He is married to Neetu Singh and has one son and one daughter. Singh was convicted for cheating in a land purchase case in 2010 along with his father and others.

== See also ==
- Madhya Pradesh Legislative Assembly
- 2013 Madhya Pradesh Legislative Assembly election
