= Neelesh Awasthi =

Indian politician

Member of the Madhya Pradesh Legislative Assembly
- In office 2013–2018
- Preceded by: Ajay Vishnoi
- Succeeded by: Ajay Vishnoi
- Constituency: Patan

Personal details
- Born: 8 September 1974 (age 51) Jabalpur
- Party: Indian National Congress
- Spouse: Surbhi Awasthi
- Education: MCom
- Profession: Politician
- As of 13 June, 2018 Source: ["Biography:Awasthi, Neelesh" (PDF). Madhya Pradesh Legislative Assembly.]

Neelesh Awasthi is an Indian politician and a member of the Bhartiya Janta Party

== Political career ==
He became an MLA in 2013.

== See also ==
- Madhya Pradesh Legislative Assembly
- 2013 Madhya Pradesh Legislative Assembly election
