= Ashwin Joshi =

Indian politician

Member of Madhya Pradesh Legislative Assembly
- In office 1998–2013
- Preceded by: Gopi Krishna Nema
- Succeeded by: Usha Thakur
- Constituency: Indore-3

Personal details
- Born: 24 August 1960 (age 65) Ahmedabad, Gujarat
- Party: Indian National Congress
- Spouse: Manpreet Joshi
- Children: 1 son & 1 daughter
- Education: MSc Geology
- Alma mater: Holkar Science College
- Profession: Agriculturist, politician
- As of 29 June, 2018 Source: ["Biography" (PDF). Vidhan Sabha, Madhya Pradesh Legislative Assembly.]

Ashwin Joshi is an Indian politician and member of the Indian National Congress. Joshi was a member of the Madhya Pradesh Legislative Assembly from the Indore-3 constituency in Indore district. He represented the constituency for three consecutive terms from 1998 to 2013. He is the nephew of veteran Congress leader Mahesh Joshi, who also represented Indore-3 (Vidhan Sabha constituency) from 1980 to 1990. He is well known for his poetic style speeches.

Preceded by Gopi Krishna Nema	Indore-3 (Vidhan Sabha constituency) Elected Representative	Succeeded by Usha Thakur

== Political career ==
He enrolled in politics from student life. He served as president of Holkar Science College for two consecutive years (1980-1981 & 1981-1982). Afterwards, in 1982-1983 he held position of secretary at Devi Ahilya Vishwavidyalaya, Indore. He then held positions at Madhya Pradesh youth Congress and Indore city Congress Committee. He then got elected as MLA for three consecutive terms from Indore-3 constituency in between 1998 and 2013. Narayan Prasad Shukla and Mahesh Joshi (Madhya Pradesh politician) played a significant role in strengthening the political foundation of Ashwin Joshi in Indore’s Vidhan Sabha constituency number 3. Owing to his strong influence and deep public connect in the constituency, Shukla actively supported Joshi during elections and was regarded as one of the key figures behind his political rise in the region.

== See also ==
- Madhya Pradesh Legislative Assembly
- 2013 Madhya Pradesh Legislative Assembly election
- 2008 Madhya Pradesh Legislative Assembly election
- 2003 Madhya Pradesh Legislative Assembly election
- 1998 Madhya Pradesh Legislative Assembly election
