= Gopi Krishna =

Gopi Krishna may refer to:

- Gopi Krishna (yogi) (1903–1984), Indian yogi, social reformer and writer
- V. Gopi Krishna (died 1980), Indian cinematographer
- Gopi Krishna (dancer) (1935–1994), Indian dancer and choreographer
- Gopi Krishna (film editor) (born 1985), Indian film editor
- Gopi Krishna (film), a 1992 Indian Kannada-language romantic comedy film

== See also ==
- Gopi Kishan, a 1994 Indian film
- Gopi Krishna Nema, Indian politician
- Gopi Krishnan, Indian educationist
