= Mahesh Joshi (Madhya Pradesh politician) =

Indian politician (1939–2021)

Member of the Madhya Pradesh Legislative Assembly
- In office 1967–1972
- Preceded by: A B K Beg
- Succeeded by: Om Prakash Rawal
- Constituency: Indore-1
- In office 1980–1990
- Preceded by: Rajendra Dharkar
- Succeeded by: Gopi Krishna Nema
- Constituency: Indore-3

Personal details
- Born: 2 April 1939
- Died: 9 April 2021 (aged 82) Bhopal, India
- Party: Indian National Congress
- Children: 3, including Deepak Joshi Pintu
- Profession: Agriculturist, Politician

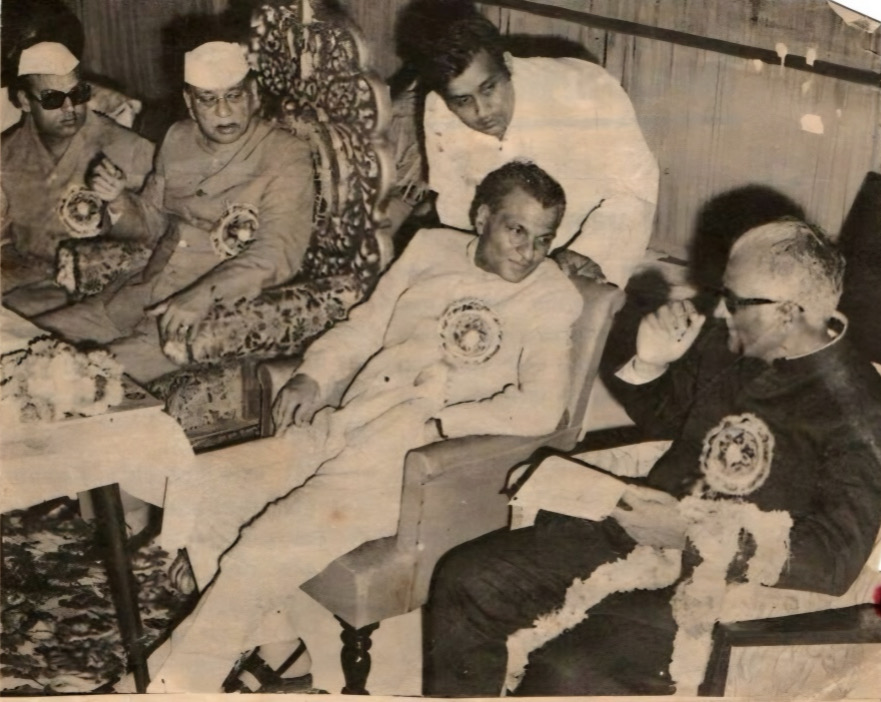
Mahesh Joshi with Former Home minister Narayan Prasad Shukla.

Mahesh Joshi (2 April 1939 – 9 April 2021) was an Indian politician and member of the Indian National Congress. He was born in Kushalgarh, Rajasthan. Joshi was a member of the Madhya Pradesh Legislative Assembly from the Indore-3 constituency in Indore. He was a member of Coordination committee of Madhya Pradesh Congress Committee.

== See also ==
- 1980 Madhya Pradesh Legislative Assembly election
- 1985 Madhya Pradesh Legislative Assembly election
- Indore-3 (Vidhan Sabha constituency)
- Madhya Pradesh Congress Committee
