= Narayan Prasad Chaudhary =

Indian politician

N.P. Chaudhary

Member of the Rajya Sabha
- In office 1968–1980
- Constituency: Madhya Pradesh

Personal details
- Born: Jabalpur, Madhya Pradesh, India
- Party: Indian National Congress
- Children: Shekhar Choudhary
- Occupation: Politician, social activist

N.P. Choudhary was an Indian politician and member of the Indian National Congress party. He represented Patan (Madhya Pradesh Vidhan Sabha constituency). He also served as a Rajya Sabha member continuously from 1968 to 1980 . He represented the state of Madhya Pradesh . He served as a Mayor in Jabalpur Nagar Nigam.
