= Akash Vijayvargiya =

Indian politician

Member of the Madhya Pradesh Legislative Assembly
- In office December 2018 – 3 December 2023
- Preceded by: Usha Thakur
- Succeeded by: Golu Shukla
- Constituency: Indore-3

Personal details
- Born: 12 September 1984 (age 41)
- Party: Bharatiya Janata Party
- Parent: Kailash Vijayvargiya (father)
- Profession: Politician
- Website: http://akashvijayvargiya.com

Akash Vijayvargiya is an Indian politician of BJP from Indore, Madhya Pradesh. In 2018 Madhya Pradesh Legislative Assembly election, Vijayvargiya defeated Indian National Congress veteran and 3 time MLA Ashwin Joshi by a margin of over 5700 votes to win his debut election. He is author of spiritual motivational book ‘Dev Se Mahadev’. This book was launched in presence of Baba Ramdev. He is the eldest son of Bharatiya Janata Party's National General Secretary Kailash Vijayvargiya. Akash Vijayvargiya was awarded by "Daink Bhaskar Eminent award 2021" at Delhi for his extra ordinary efforts to help society during Covid Era. In 2023, was awarded again by central minister Ashwini Vaishnav for development work in his constituency.

== Biography ==
He is a post-graduate from Carnegie Mellon University, USA in Environment Engineering. He had conducted entrepreneur research work at IIM Ahmedabad. His research project was selected by IIM Ahmedabad for online business implementation in India. He joined the BJP since 2008 and presently from 11 November 2012 as the District Officer of Deendayal Mandal Serving.

== Controversies ==
On 26 June 2019, he was in the news for beating up a government servant with a cricket bat, an action which drew sharp criticism from all quarters, including members of his own political party. After the video clip got viral, he was arrested by MP police.
