= Narelle =

Narelle is a given name and surname and may refer to:

== People ==
- Marie Narelle, (1870–1941), Australian singer
- Narelle Autio, (born 1969), Australian photographer
- Narelle Jubelin, (born 1960), Australian artist
- Narelle Kellner, (1934–1987), Australian chess player
- Narelle Kheng, (born 1993), Chinese-Singaporean musician, actress and swimmer
- Narelle Moras, (born 1956), Australian swimmer
- Narelle Oliver (1960–2016), Australian artist

== Other ==
- List of storms named Narelle, 2013 and 2026 tropical cyclones
  - Cyclone Narelle (2013)
  - Cyclone Narelle (2026)
- Narelle Smart, fictional character from Home and Away

== See also ==
- Narela (disambiguation)
