= Golu Shukla =

Indian politician

Member of the Madhya Pradesh Legislative Assembly
- Incumbent
- Assumed office 2023
- Preceded by: Akash Vijayvargiya
- Constituency: Indore-3

Personal details
- Party: Bharatiya Janata Party
- Profession: Politician

Golu Shukla Rakesh is an Indian politician from Madhya Pradesh. He is a member of the Madhya Pradesh Legislative Assembly from 2023, representing Indore-3 Assembly constituency as a Member of the Bharatiya Janata Party. Before this, he was the city president of Bharatiya Janata Yuva Morcha, Indore.

== See also ==
- List of chief ministers of Madhya Pradesh
- Madhya Pradesh Legislative Assembly
