= Sanjeev Chhotelal Uikey =

Indian politician

Member of the Madhya Pradesh Legislative Assembly
- Incumbent
- Assumed office 2013
- Preceded by: Dev Singh Saiyam
- Constituency: Mandla

Personal details
- Born: 1 July 1972 (age 53)
- Citizenship: India
- Party: Indian National Congress
- Spouse: Neetika Uikey
- Education: MA (Hindi)
- Profession: Politician

Sanjeev Chhotelal Uikey is an Indian politician and a member of the Indian National Congress party.

== Political career ==
He became an MLA in 2013

== Political views ==
He supports Congress Party's Ideology

== Personal life ==
He is married to Neetika Uikey.

== See also ==
- Madhya Pradesh Legislative Assembly
- 2013 Madhya Pradesh Legislative Assembly election
- 2008 Madhya Pradesh Legislative Assembly election
