= Ichhawar Assembly constituency =

Constituency of the Madhya Pradesh legislative assembly in India

Coordinates: 23.03°N 77.02°E

Ichhawar
- Constituency No. 158 for the Madhya Pradesh Legislative Assembly

Constituency details
- Country: India
- Region: Central India
- State: Madhya Pradesh
- District: Sehore
- Lok Sabha constituency: Vidisha
- Established: 1977
- Reservation: None

Member of Legislative Assembly
- 16th Madhya Pradesh Legislative Assembly
- Incumbent Karan Singh Verma
- Party: Bharatiya Janata Party
- Elected year: 2023
- Preceded by: Shailendra Patel

Ichhawar Assembly constituency is one of the 230 Vidhan Sabha (Legislative Assembly) constituencies of Madhya Pradesh state in central India.

It is part of Sehore District.

== Members of Legislative Assembly ==
=== Bhopal Legislative Assembly ===
| Election | Name | Party |
|---|---|---|
| 1952 | Kesarimal Jain | Indian National Congress |

=== Madhya Pradesh Legislative Assembly ===
| Election | Member | Party |
|---|---|---|
| 1977 | Narayan Prasad Gupta | Janata Party |
| 1980 | Hari Charan Verma | Bharatiya Janata Party |
| 1985 | Karan Singh Verma | Bharatiya Janata Party |
| 1990 | Karan Singh Verma | Bharatiya Janata Party |
| 1993 | Karan Singh Verma | Bharatiya Janata Party |
| 1998 | Karan Singh Verma | Bharatiya Janata Party |
| 2003 | Karan Singh Verma | Bharatiya Janata Party |
| 2008 | Karan Singh Verma | Bharatiya Janata Party |
| 2013 | Shailendra Patel | Indian National Congress |
| 2018 | Karan Singh Verma | Bharatiya Janata Party |
| 2023 | Karan Singh Verma | Bharatiya Janata Party |

== Election results ==
=== 2023 ===
2023 Madhya Pradesh Legislative Assembly election: Ichhawar
| Party | Candidate | Votes | % | ±% |
|---|---|---|---|---|
| BJP | Karan Singh Verma | 103,205 | 52.59 | +2.17 |
| INC | Shailendra Patel | 86,859 | 44.26 | +3.08 |
| NOTA | None of the above | 1,322 | 0.67 | −0.33 |
| Majority | | 16,346 | 8.33 | −0.91 |
| Turnout | | 196,233 | 87.15 | +0.72 |
| BJP hold | | Swing | | |

=== 2018 ===
2018 Madhya Pradesh Legislative Assembly election: Ichhawar
| Party | Candidate | Votes | % | ±% |
|---|---|---|---|---|
| BJP | Karan Singh Verma | 87,134 | 50.42 | |
| INC | Shailendra Patel | 71,173 | 41.18 | |
| Independent | Kunvar Tulasiram Patel | 5,193 | 3.0 | |
| BSP | Rajesh Jangde | 2,307 | 1.33 | |
| NOTA | None of the above | 1,723 | 1.0 | |
| Majority | | 15,961 | 9.24 | |
| Turnout | | 172,826 | 86.43 | |
| BJP gain from INC | | Swing | | |

=== 2013 ===
M. P. Legislative Assembly Election, 2013: Ichhawar
| Party | Candidate | Votes | % | ±% |
|---|---|---|---|---|
| INC | Shailendra Patel | 74,704 | 46.63 | |
| BJP | Karan Singh Kanhaiyalal | 73,960 | 46.17 | |
| Independent | Shailendra Ramcharan Patel | 2,246 | 1.40 | |
| BSP | Anokhi Lal | 1,776 | 1.11 | N/A |
| ABGP | Narendra Singh Mandoliya | 1,463 | 0.91 | |
| Independent | Ajab Singh Mewada | 1,109 | 0.69 | |
| Independent | Shailendra Radheshyam Patel | 1,088 | 0.68 | |
| Independent | Mahendra Kumar | 470 | 0.29 | |
| PRSP | Shivram Parmar | 469 | 0.29 | |
| Independent | Naveen | 414 | 0.26 | |
| Independent | Umaraosingh | 293 | 0.18 | |
| Independent | Karan Singh Bulaki | 221 | 0.14 | |
| NOTA | None of the Above | 1,989 | 1.24 | |
| Majority | | 744 | 0.46 | |
| Turnout | | 160202 | 84.68 | |
| INC gain from BJP | | Swing | | |

== See also ==
- Ichhawar
