= Lakhnadon Assembly constituency =

Constituency of the Madhya Pradesh legislative assembly in India

Coordinates: 22.60°N 79.60°E

Lakhnadon
- Constituency No. 117 for the Madhya Pradesh Legislative Assembly

Constituency details
- Country: India
- Region: Central India
- State: Madhya Pradesh
- District: Seoni
- Lok Sabha constituency: Mandla
- Established: 1951
- Total electors: 268,163
- Reservation: ST

Member of Legislative Assembly
- 16th Madhya Pradesh Legislative Assembly
- Incumbent Yogendra Singh
- Party: Indian National Congress
- Elected year: 2023
- Preceded by: Shashi Thakur

Lakhnadon is one of the 230 Vidhan Sabha (Legislative Assembly) constituencies of Madhya Pradesh state in central India.

It is part of Seoni district.

== Members of the Legislative Assembly ==
=== As a constituency of Madhya Bharat ===
Election	Member	Party
1952	Durgashankar Mehta	Indian National Congress

=== As a constituency of Madhya Pradesh ===
Election	Member	Party
1957	Vasant Rao Uikey	Indian National Congress
1962	Vasant Rao Uikey	Indian National Congress
1967	Vasant Rao Uikey	Indian National Congress
1972	Vasant Rao Uikey	Indian National Congress
1977	Satyendra Singh	Indian National Congress
1980	Satyendra Singh	Indian National Congress (Indira)
1985	Satyendra Singh	Indian National Congress
1990	Randhir Singh	Indian National Congress
1993	Randhir Singh	Indian National Congress
1998	Randhir Singh	Indian National Congress
2003	Shashi Thakur	Bharatiya Janata Party
2008	Shashi Thakur	Bharatiya Janata Party
2013	Yogendra Singh	Indian National Congress
2018	Yogendra Singh	Indian National Congress
2023	Yogendra Singh	Indian National Congress

== Election results ==
=== 2023 ===
2023 Madhya Pradesh Legislative Assembly election: Lakhnadon
Party	Candidate	Votes	%	±%
INC	Yogendra Singh	114,519	45.76	+6.3
BJP	Vijay Uikey	95,898	38.32	+4.7
GGP	Bhai Santar Walari	26,692	10.67	−8.37
Independent	Engineer Santosh Uikey	2,584	1.03	
NOTA	None of the above	4,192	1.67	−0.19
Majority		18,621	7.44	+1.6
Turnout		250,276	84.92	+6.53
INC hold		Swing		

=== 2018 ===
2018 Madhya Pradesh Legislative Assembly election: Lakhnadon
Party	Candidate	Votes	%	±%
INC	Yogendra Singh	82,951	39.46	
BJP	Vijay Kumar Uikey	70,675	33.62	
GGP	Inder Singh Uikey	40,022	19.04	
AAP	Santram Kanhairiya	3,331	1.58	
API	Shobharam Bhalavi	3,294	1.57	
BSP	Kamlesh Jalso Uikey	2,843	1.35	
NOTA	None of the above	3,917	1.86	
Majority		12,276	5.84	
Turnout		210,215	78.39	
INC hold		Swing		

=== 2013 ===
2013 Madhya Pradesh Legislative Assembly election: Lakhnadon
Party	Candidate	Votes	%	±%
INC	Yogendra Singh	77,928	41.47	
BJP	Shashi Thakur	65147	34.66	
GGP	Anand Inwati	23040	12.26	
NCP	Rajeswari Uikey	5338	2.84	
BSP	Guman Singh Uikey	3098	1.65	N/A
Independent	Ram Ganesh Saryam	2710	1.44	
NOTA	None of the Above	5139	2.73	
Majority				
Turnout		187935	78.16	
INC gain from BJP		Swing		

== See also ==
- Lakhnadon
