= Barwara Assembly constituency =

Constituency of the Madhya Pradesh legislative assembly in India

Coordinates: 23.87°N 80.33°E

Barwara
- Constituency No. 91 for the Madhya Pradesh Legislative Assembly

Constituency details
- Country: India
- Region: Central India
- State: Madhya Pradesh
- District: Katni
- Lok Sabha constituency: Shahdol
- Established: 2008
- Reservation: ST

Member of Legislative Assembly
- 16th Madhya Pradesh Legislative Assembly
- Incumbent Dhirendra Bahadur Singh
- Party: Bharatiya Janata Party
- Elected year: 2023
- Preceded by: Vijayraghvendra Singh

Barwara is one of the 230 Vidhan Sabha (Legislative Assembly) constituencies of Madhya Pradesh state in central India.

It is part of Katni District and is reserved for members of the Scheduled Tribes. As of 2023, its representative is Dhirendra Bahadur Singh of the Bharatiya Janata Party.

== Members of the Legislative Assembly ==
Election	Name	Party
2008	Moti Kashyap	Bharatiya Janata Party
2013	Moti Kashyap	Bharatiya Janata Party
2018	Vijayraghvendra Singh	Indian National Congress
2023	Dhirendra Bahadur Singh	Bharatiya Janata Party

== Election results ==
=== 2023 ===
2023 Madhya Pradesh Legislative Assembly election: Barwara
Party	Candidate	Votes	%	±%
BJP	Dhirendra Bahadur Singh	112,916	56.92	+20.36
INC	Vijayraghvendra Singh	61,923	31.21	−17.77
GGP	Arvind Singh Tekam	10,060	5.07	+2.2
Independent	Geeta Singh	4,273	2.15	
CPI	Suresh Kol	3,316	1.67	+0.66
NOTA	None of the above	3,386	1.71	−0.49
Majority		50,993	25.71	+13.29
Turnout		198,380	78.23	+3.33
BJP gain from INC		Swing		

=== 2018 ===
2018 Madhya Pradesh Legislative Assembly election: Barwara
Party	Candidate	Votes	%	±%
INC	Vijayraghvendra Singh	84,236	48.98	
BJP	Moti Kashyap	62,876	36.56	
BSP	Ajay Gotiya	5,942	3.46	
GGP	Arvind Singh Tekam	4,938	2.87	
Independent	Ratan Lal Bhattar	2,024	1.18	
Independent	Baniya Prasad	1,877	1.09	
CPI	Anjan Kol	1,745	1.01	
NOTA	None of the above	3,783	2.2	
Majority		21,360	12.42	
Turnout		171,977	74.9	
INC gain from BJP		Swing		
