= Laxmi Narsimha Temple, Nira Narsingpur =

Temple in Maharashtra

Shri Laxmi Narsimha Temple
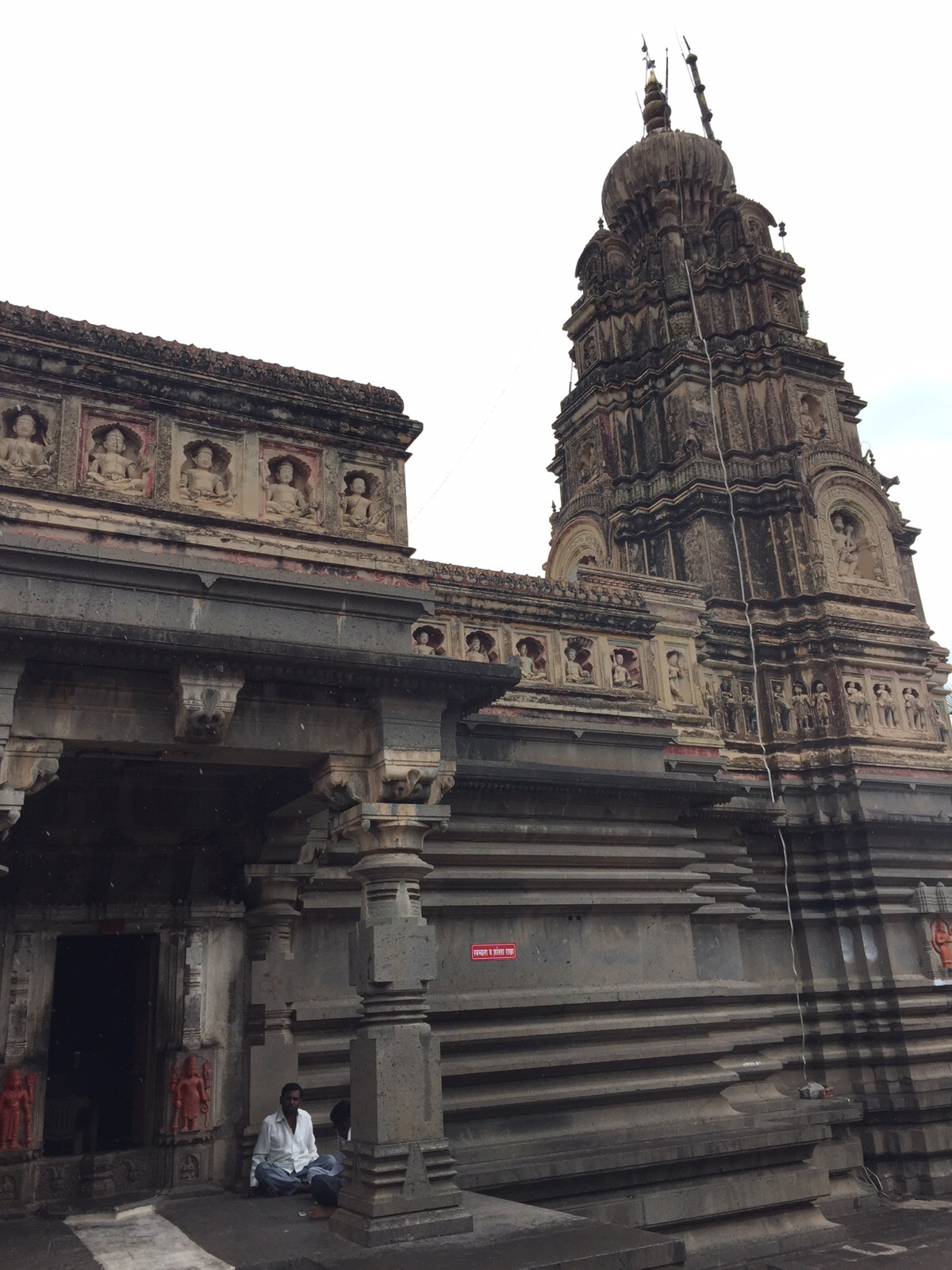

- Location in Maharashtra

Religion
- Affiliation: Hinduism
- District: Pune
- Deity: Narasimha
- Festival: Narasimha Jayanti

Location
- Location: Nira Narsingpur
- State: Maharashtra
- Country: India
- Interactive map of Shri Laxmi Narsimha Temple
- Coordinates: 17°58′15.7″N 75°07′55.6″E

Architecture
- Type: Peshwa
- Creator: rebuilt by Raghunath Rao Vinchurkar
- Completed: 1787

Shri Laxmi Narsimha Temple (popularly known as Nira Narasimha) (Marathi: श्री लक्ष्मी नृसिंह देवस्थान), is one of the oldest Hindu temples dedicated to Narasimha, an avatar of Vishnu, located in Nira Narsingpur, Pune district, Maharashtra. The temple is located at the confluence of Bhima river and Nira river, at the south eastern tip of Pune district, in Indapur taluka. Priests in the temple are Deshastha Madhva Brahmins and temple is under their control. They belong to Uttaradi Math and rituals in the temple are followed as per Tantra Sara Sangraha of Madhvacharya.

== Architecture and history ==
The temple is located at the ghat at confluence of Bhima river and Nira river. The construction of the ghat was completed in 1527. The current structure of the temple was built in 1787 with the help of Sardar Vitthal Shivdev Dani at a cost of about £45,000 (Rs. 4,50,000).

The temple has been built in Peshwa architectural style in black stone. It took approximately twenty years for the completion of the temple construction. There are three main doors facing towards East, North and West. The western door is fortified like Shaniwar Wada and has thirty three steps leading up to the temple. There are two murtis (icons) of Narasimha in the main temple, one is made of sand and the other of black stone. Original murti was replaced by a duplicate one due to the fear of Aurangzeb.

There is a big bell located near the west door. This bell was originally a church bell located at the Portuguese church of Vasai. In the year 1739, Bajirao Peshwa's younger brother Chimaji Appa captured Vasai from the Portuguese Empire and took the four church bells to Pune. One of the bells was brought to the temple by Diwan Sadashiv Mankeshwar who was the inamdar of Tembhurni village.

There are several small temples located in the complex. They are of Laxmi, Prahlad, Ganesh, Dattatreya, Bhimashankar, Vitthal Rukmini, Raghavendra Tirtha, Shakambhari, Kashi Vishweshwar, Bhairava and Rameshwar.

== Festivals ==
Vaisakha Navratri is the biggest festival celebrated at the temple. The festival starts on the sixth day of the month of Vaisakha and ends on fourteenth day which is Narasimha Jayanti. A procession of Narasimha's paduka is taken out on the fifteenth day followed by Dahi Handi on the next day. The festival is marked by Pravachan, Bhajan, Kirtan and Indian classical music concerts.
