= Indapur =

- town
- Location in Maharashtra, India
- Coordinates: 18°07′02″N 75°01′35″E
- Country: India
- State: Maharashtra
- District: Pune
- Elevation: 527 m (1,729 ft)

Population (2011)
  - Total: 25,515

Languages
  - Official: Marathi
- Time zone: UTC+5:30 (IST)
- Postal code: 413106
- Vehicle registration: MH-42

Indapur is a town and a municipal council in Pune district in the Indian state of Maharashtra. Indapur is known for Jahagir of Chhatrapati Shivaji Maharaj's father and grandfather. Chhatrapati Shivaji Maharaj's grandfather Malojiraje died in battle in Indapur.

It has National Highway 65 connecting the south and west region of India. Noted Marathi poet Shanta Shelke was born in Indapur. Indapur city is located to the nearest Bhima River, Ujani Dam & Baramati-the hometown of Indian politician Mr. Sharad Pawar.

== Demographics ==
As of 2001 India census, Indapur had a population of 21,584. Men constitute 52% of the population and Women ~48%. Indapur has an average literacy rate of 69%, higher than the national average of 59.5%: Male literacy is 75%, and female literacy is 62%. In Indapur, 14% of the population is under 6 years of age.

== Climate ==
Indapur is a quiet hot place as it receives scanty rainfall. Shetphal lake is the major water reservoir in the district. Ujjani dam backwater along with Nira left canal and Khadakwasla canal system are major sources of irrigation and water supply for Indapur Taluka.

== Crops ==
Crops like wheat, sugarcane and jowar are grown here. The place also owns many heavy machinery factories. The most noted among these is the ordnance factory of Government of India at Walchand Nagar. This factory holds great importance for the defense of India.

== History ==
Indapur has historic significance in the expansion of Mughal empires in Central-South India, and subsequent Maratha resistance. Indapur was the Jagir of Malojiraje and Shahajiraje Bhosale. The historical place where Shivaji's grandfather Shri Malojiraje was living & died in a war. This place also known for the Shri 1008 Shantinath Digambar Jain Teerth Kshetra. Vishwasrao Peshwa of the Maratha Empire was born in Indapur.

And Former Minister of Maharashtra Harshvardhan patil (Bhau) is from Indapur. He was four times MLA from indapur & also work as minister in maharashtra..

=== Malojiraje ===
Born to Babaji Bhosale, Malojiraje (grandfather of the Chhatrapati Shivaji Maharaj) was a Sardar under Nizamshah - the ruler of that region appointed by the Moghul emperor. At the start of his service, Malojiraje received the Jagir of Indapur and Supe from Nizamshah. In Indpaur Jagir there were about 34 villages. The neighboring ruler, Adilshah, was a constant threat to Nijamshah, mainly over territorial disputes. In the year 1599, AD, Malojiraje died fighting in the Indapur Battle against Adilshah; at that time, his son (and Shivaji maharaj's father) Shahajiraje was only 5 years old.

The brother of Malojiraje, Vithojiraje gave 17.5 ruke (nearly 1 acre) of land for the samadhi (final resting place) of Malojiraje. However, this structure was destroyed over the years. But the footprints (paduka) on the Samadhi are in a good condition and put in the Indreshwar Mandir in Indapur.

=== Shahajiraje ===
After the death of Malojiraje his elder son Shahajiraje became Sardar of Nijamshah and again the Jagir of Indapur came under Shahajiraje and later on the same was transferred to Shivaji.

While Shahajiraje was the Sardar of Adilshah, Nijamshah offered the Jagir of Indapur and Supe to him in order to get him back. From this incident, the importance of Indapur city is very much evident.

=== Battle of Sinhagad ===
In the year 1660, Indapur, Baramati and Pune had been captured by the Mogul army headed by Shaistekhan. Nearly 10 years later in 1670, the entire area was won back by the Maratha Army under the leadership of Shivaji Raje in the battles starting from the battle of Sinhagad.

In June 1670, the Mogul army was totally unprepared and ill-equipped as the Monsoon had arrived. Sensing this as a unique opportunity, before the preparation of the Mogul army, Shivaji decided to attack the urban area of Pune, Baramati, Supe and Indapur in the rainy season. Within 10–15 days, Marathas captured all these areas back from Mughals using their famous guerilla warfare techniques. Nearly 1500 Mogul infantry fled to Pune from Sinhagad after the battle. By the time rainy season started, Indapur, Baramati and many other regions, excluding Pune, were won by Marathas.

This battle significantly boosted the confidence of Marathas and within two months after this battle, the Maratha army won all nearby forts like Purandar, Lohagad and so on.

=== Malik Ahmad: establishment of Nizamshahi of Ahmednagar (1490) ===
With the establishment of the Nizamshahi rule with Ahmednagar as its headquarters, practically the whole of the Poona territory, perhaps with the exception of Indapur, which still continued to be under at least the nominal suzerainty of Yusuf Adil Khan of Bijapur, came under the unified control of the Nizamshahi.

== Shri 1008 Shantinath Digambar Jain Mandir ==
The Shantinath Jain Teerth, also known as Shri 1008 Shantinath Digambar Jain Mandir, is a Jain temple located in Indapur. The temple is known for its 27-foot tall granite idol of Shri 1008 Munisuvrata, the twentieth Tirthankara.

== Nira Narsingpur ==
Nira Narsingpur is a village in Indapur taluka of Pune district, Maharashtra, India.[1] The confluence of rivers Bhima and Nira is 3 km from the temple. The Shri Laxmi Narsimha Temple is the Kuldaiwat (family deity) for a number of Marathi families of different castes.

This place derives its significance from Hindu mythology. The daitya prince Prahlada is believed to have taken a bath in the Bhima river made an idol of deity Narasimha with the sand and worshipped him.

== Accessibility ==
Indapur Bus Station operates buses to and from Indapur. You can also catch buses to Indapur from Platform number:9 of Swargate Bus Terminal.MSRTC buses from Baramati bus stop . Baramati railway station is the nearest. Pune airport is the most convenient way for air travelers. Areas Under Indapur Nimbgaon

== Notable people ==
- Malojiraje Bhosale, grandfather of Chhatrapati Shivaji Maharaj
- Shanta Shelke, poet
- Harshvardhan Patil , politician
- Dattatray Vithoba Bharne, politician
- Shankarrao Bajirao Patil, politician
