= Yogendra Singh (politician) =

Indian politician

Yogendra Singh (Baba)

Member of the Madhya Pradesh Legislative Assembly
- Incumbent
- Assumed office 2013
- Preceded by: Shashi Thakur
- Constituency: Lakhnadon

Personal details
- Born: 1 February 1972 (age 54) Saraipali, Raipur
- Citizenship: India
- Party: INC, (Indian National Congress)
- Spouse: Preeti Singh
- Education: M.A. in Sociology
- Alma mater: Barkatullah University, Bhopal
- Profession: Politician

Yogendra Singh (born 1 February 1972) is an Indian politician from Madhya Pradesh. He is a three time MLA from Lakhnadon Assembly constituency which is reserved for Scheduled Tribe community in Seoni District. He represents the Indian National Congress party. He won the 2023 Madhya Pradesh Legislative Assembly election.

== Early life and education ==
Singh is from Bhopal South, Madhya Pradesh. He married Preeti Singh. He is the son of late Virender Bahadur Singh. He completed his M.A. in sociology, in 1995 at Barkatullah University, Bhopal.

== Career ==
Singh first became an MLA from Lakhnadon Assembly constituency winning the 2013 Madhya Pradesh Legislative Assembly election, and was re-elected in 2018. He won for the third time in the 2023 Assembly election from the same seat on Congress ticket.

== See also ==
- Madhya Pradesh Legislative Assembly
- 2013 Madhya Pradesh Legislative Assembly election
- 2008 Madhya Pradesh Legislative Assembly election
