= Ghatiya Assembly constituency =

Constituency of the Madhya Pradesh legislative assembly in India

Coordinates: 23.382°N 75.851°E

Ghatiya
- Constituency No. 215 for the Madhya Pradesh Legislative Assembly

Constituency details
- Country: India
- Region: Central India
- State: Madhya Pradesh
- District: Ujjain
- Lok Sabha constituency: Ujjain
- Established: 1977
- Reservation: SC

Member of Legislative Assembly
- 16th Madhya Pradesh Legislative Assembly
- Incumbent Satish Malviya
- Party: Bharatiya Janata Party
- Elected year: 2023
- Preceded by: Ramlal Malviya

Ghatiya is one of the 230 assembly constituencies of Madhya Pradesh a central Indian state. Ghatiya is also part of Ujjain Lok Sabha constituency.

== Members of the Legislative Assembly ==
Election	Name	Party
1977	Gangaram Parmar	Janata Party
1980	Nagulal Malviya	Bharatiya Janata Party
1985	Avantika Prasad Marmat	Indian National Congress
1990	Rameshwar Akhand	Bharatiya Janata Party
1993	Rameshwar Akhand	Bharatiya Janata Party
1998	Ramlal Malviya	Indian National Congress
2003	Narayan Parmar	Bharatiya Janata Party
2008	Ramlal Malviya	Indian National Congress
2013	Satish Malviya	Bharatiya Janata Party
2018	Ramlal Malviya	Indian National Congress
2023	Satish Malviya	Bharatiya Janata Party

== Election results ==
=== 2023 ===
2023 Madhya Pradesh Legislative Assembly election: Ghatiya
Party	Candidate	Votes	%	±%
BJP	Satish Malviya	96,236	52.27	+6.61
INC	Ramlal Malviya	78,570	42.68	−5.79
ASP(KR)	Ravi Gujrati	3,671	1.99	
BSP	Jeevan Singh Dewda	2,212	1.2	−0.39
NOTA	None of the above	1,257	0.68	−0.69
Majority		17,666	9.59	+6.78
Turnout		184,098	82.66	+2.44
BJP gain from INC		Swing		

=== 2018 ===
2018 Madhya Pradesh Legislative Assembly election: Ghatiya
Party	Candidate	Votes	%	±%
INC	Ramlal Malviya	79,639	48.47	
BJP	Ajit Premchand Guddu	75,011	45.66	
BSP	Nathulal Dholpure	2,618	1.59	
Bahujan Sangharsh Dal	Nirbhay Singh	1,800	1.1	
NOTA	None of the above	2,256	1.37	
Majority		4,628	2.81	
Turnout		164,296	80.22	
INC gain from		Swing		

== See also ==
- Ujjain
- Ghatiya
- Ujjain (Lok Sabha constituency)
