= Bherulal Patidar =

Indian politician

Bherulal Patidar (1941–2005) was a leader of Bharatiya Janata Party from Madhya Pradesh. He was the deputy speaker of Madhya Pradesh Legislative Assembly from 1993 to 1998. He was a member of the assembly elected four times from the Mhow constituency. Patidar served as a minister in Government of Madhya Pradesh from 1990 to 1992.
