= Rakesh Pal Singh =

Indian politician

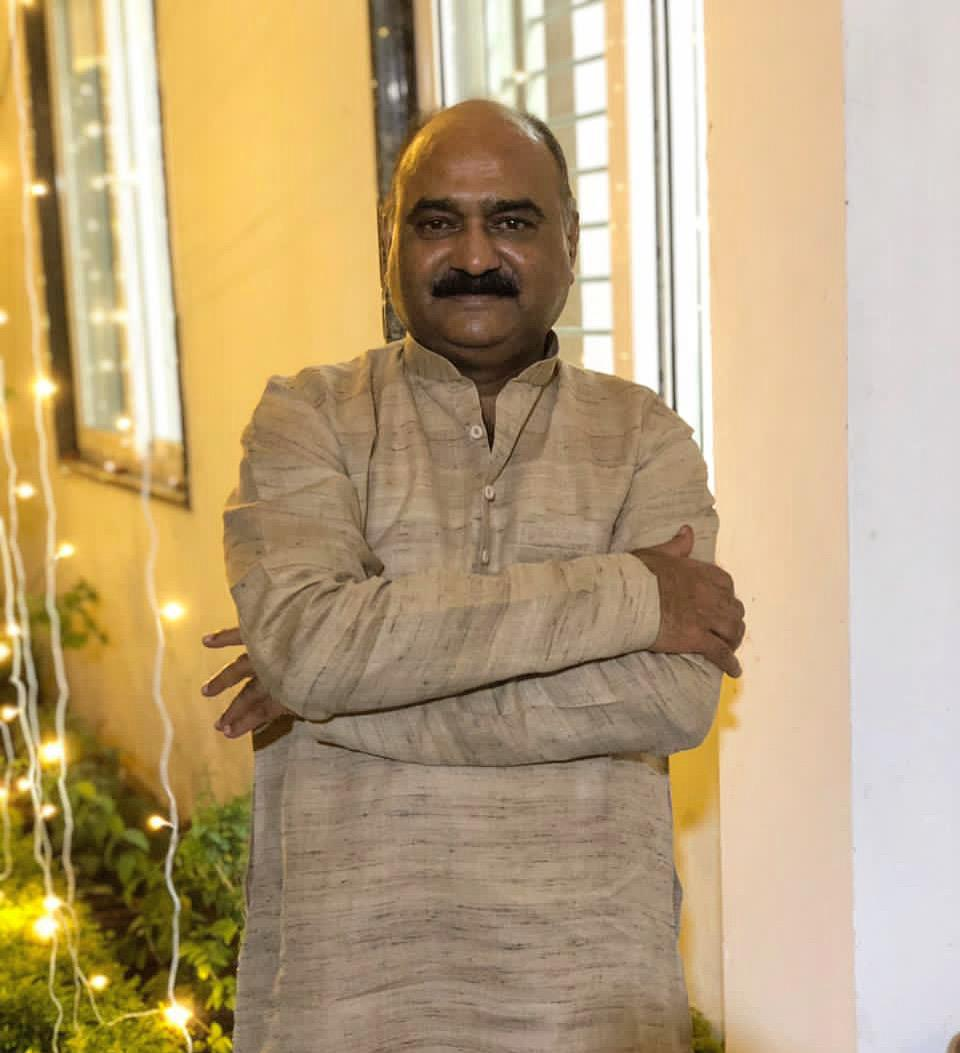

Madhya Pradesh Legislative Assembly
- Incumbent
- Assumed office 17 December 2018
- Preceded by: Rajneesh Harwansh Singh
- Succeeded by: Rajneesh Harwansh Singh
- Constituency: Keolari

President of Seoni Madhya Pradesh Bharatiya Janata Party
- In office 3 January 2018 – 17 December 2018

Personal details
- Born: 3 June 1959 (age 66) Seoni, Madhya Pradesh, India
- Party: Bharatiya Janata Party
- Spouse: Jyoti Singh
- Children: 2
- Education: B.Sc, Dr. Hari Singh Gour University

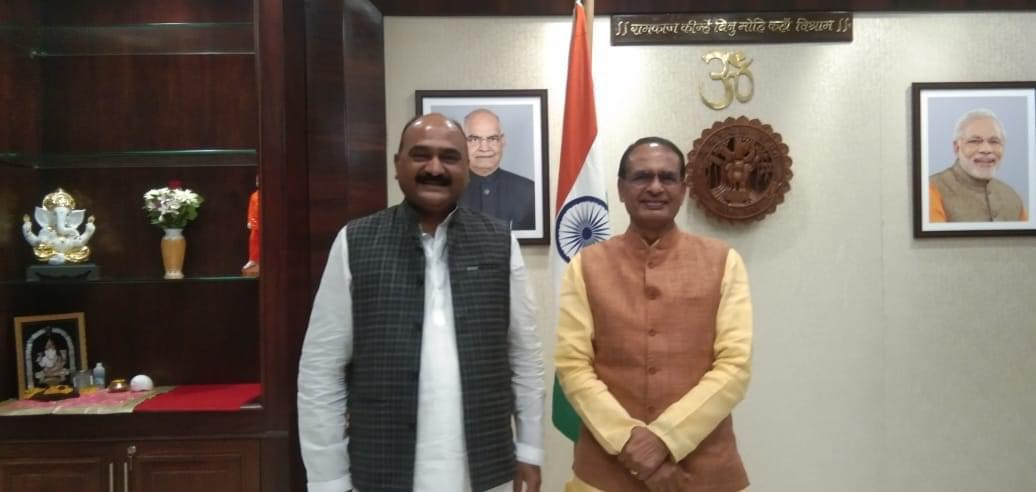

Rakesh Pal Singh (born 3 June 1959) is an Indian politician and a Madhya Pradesh Legislative Assembly member in the Keolari. He is member of the Bharatiya Janata Party.

He was appointed the district president of Seoni of the Bharatiya Janata Party.

== Personal life ==
Singh was born in Seoni, Madhya Pradesh. He graduated with a Bachelor of Science degree from Dr. Hari Singh Gour University. He married Jyoti Singh, with whom he has one son Jayant Pal Singh and one daughter. He is organising Rama Navami rally from past 15 years in which more than 10000 people participate.
