= Bichhiya Assembly constituency =

Constituency of the Madhya Pradesh legislative assembly in India

Coordinates: 22.45°N 80.71°E

Bichhiya
- Constituency No. 105 for the Madhya Pradesh Legislative Assembly

Constituency details
- Country: India
- Region: Central India
- State: Madhya Pradesh
- District: Mandla
- Lok Sabha constituency: Mandla
- Established: 1957
- Reservation: ST

Member of Legislative Assembly
- 16th Madhya Pradesh Legislative Assembly
- Incumbent Narayan Singh Patta
- Party: Indian National Congress
- Elected year: 2023
- Preceded by: Pandit Singh Dhurwey

Bichhiya is one of the 230 Vidhan Sabha (Legislative Assembly) constituencies of Madhya Pradesh state in central India.

It is part of Mandla district.

== Members of the Legislative Assembly ==
Election	Name	Party
1957	Baredi Bhoi Patta	Indian National Congress
1962	Shenkerlal	Akhil Bharatiya Ram Rajya Parishad
1967	Darbari Singh	Indian National Congress
1972	Darbari Singh	Indian National Congress
1977	Mangilal	Janata Party
1980	Manik Lal Pareti	Indian National Congress (Indira)
1985	Manik Lal Pareti	Indian National Congress
1990	Roop Singh	Bharatiya Janata Party
1993	Jhallu Ram Tekam	Bharatiya Janata Party
1998	Tulsiram Dhumketi	Indian National Congress
2003	Pandit Singh Dhurwey	Bharatiya Janata Party
2008	Narayan Singh Patta	Indian National Congress
2013	Pandit Singh Dhurwey	Bharatiya Janata Party
2018	Narayan Singh Patta	Indian National Congress
2023	Narayan Singh Patta	Indian National Congress

== Election results ==
=== 2023 ===
2023 Madhya Pradesh Legislative Assembly election: Bichhiya
Party	Candidate	Votes	%	±%
INC	Narayan Singh Patta	89,222	41.68	+0.77
BJP	Vijay Anand Marawi	78,157	36.51	+7.03
GGP	Kamlesh Tekam	39,115	18.27	+0.94
NOTA	None of the above	4,420	2.06	−1.1
Majority		11,065	5.17	−6.26
Turnout		214,075	82.54	+4.06
INC hold		Swing		

=== 2018 ===
2018 Madhya Pradesh Legislative Assembly election: Bichhiya
Party	Candidate	Votes	%	±%
INC	Narayan Singh Patta	76,544	40.91	
BJP	Shivraj Shah	55,156	29.48	
GGP	Kamlesh Tekam	32,417	17.33	
Independent	Savitri Dhumketi	4,777	2.55	
BSP	Sunder Lal Kumhare	1,992	1.06	
AAP	Ashok Shah Dhurwey (Panda)	1,903	1.02	
Independent	Naresh Dhurwey	1,880	1.0	
NOTA	None of the above	5,915	3.16	
Majority		21,388	11.43	
Turnout		187,082	78.48	
INC gain from BJP		Swing		

== See also ==
- Bichhiya
