= Pipariya Assembly constituency =

Constituency of the Madhya Pradesh legislative assembly in India

Coordinates: 22.761°N 78.349°E

Pipariya
- Constituency No. 139 for the Madhya Pradesh Legislative Assembly

Constituency details
- Country: India
- Region: Central India
- State: Madhya Pradesh
- District: Hoshangabad
- Lok Sabha constituency: Hoshangabad
- Established: 1951
- Reservation: SC

Member of Legislative Assembly
- 16th Madhya Pradesh Legislative Assembly
- Incumbent Thakurdas Nagwanshi
- Party: Bharatiya Janata Party
- Elected year: 2023
- Preceded by: Arjun Paliya

Pipariya is one of the 230 constituencies in the Madhya Pradesh Legislative Assembly of Madhya Pradesh, a central state of India. Pipariya is also part of Hoshangabad Lok Sabha constituency. It is a reserved seat for the Scheduled Caste (SC).

== Members of the Legislative Assembly ==
Year	Member	Party
1952	Narayan Singh	Indian National Congress
1962	Ratan Kumari	Indian National Congress
1967	Ratan Kumari	Indian National Congress
1972	Ratan Kumari	Indian National Congress
1977	Ram Chandra Maheshwari	Janata Party
1980	Savita Banerjee	Indian National Congress (Indira)
1985	Tribhuvan Yadav	Indian National Congress
1990	Murli Dhar Maheshwari	Bharatiya Janata Party
1993	Suresh Rai	Indian National Congress
1998	Harishankar Jaiswal	Bharatiya Janata Party
2003	Arjun Paliya	Samajwadi Party
2008	Thakurdas Nagwanshi	Bharatiya Janata Party
2013	Thakurdas Nagwanshi	Bharatiya Janata Party
2018	Thakurdas Nagwanshi	Bharatiya Janata Party
2023	Thakurdas Nagwanshi	Bharatiya Janata Party

== Election results ==
=== 2023 ===
2023 Madhya Pradesh Legislative Assembly election: Pipariya
Party	Candidate	Votes	%	±%
BJP	Thakurdas Nagwanshi	107,372	55.09	+5.12
INC	Veerendra Belwanshi	76,849	39.43	+0.18
BSP	Pratibha Ahirwar	3,372	1.73	+0.26
NOTA	None of the above	2,859	1.47	−0.8
Majority		30,523	15.66	+4.94
Turnout		194,908	84.44	+2.7
BJP hold		Swing		

=== 2018 ===
2018 Madhya Pradesh Legislative Assembly election: Pipariya
Party	Candidate	Votes	%	±%
BJP	Thakurdas Nagwanshi	84,521	49.97	
INC	Harish Tularam Beman (Mehra)	66,391	39.25	
GGP	Nanhelal Rohar Vanshkar	5,353	3.16	
BSP	Brajesh Arya	2,491	1.47	
AAP	Sanjay Kori	2,026	1.2	
RPI(A)	Kadhorilal Goliya	1,632	0.96	
NOTA	None of the above	3,842	2.27	
Majority		18,130	10.72	
Turnout		169,153	81.74	
BJP hold		Swing		

== See also ==
- Pipariya, Narmadapuram
- List of constituencies of Madhya Pradesh Legislative Assembly
- Narmadapuram
