= Antar Singh Darbar =

Indian politician

Member of the Madhya Pradesh Legislative Assembly
- In office 1998–2008
- Succeeded by: Kailash Vijayvargiya
- Constituency: Mhow

Personal details
- Born: 1 February 1955 (age 71) Nanded Village, Mhow
- Citizenship: India
- Party: Bharatiya Janata Party (2024-Present)
- Education: BA
- Profession: Politician
- Website: http://www.antarsinghdarbar.com/
- As of 29 May, 2018

Antar Singh Darbar is an Indian politician and a former member of the legislative assembly from the state of Madhya Pradesh.

== Political career ==
He was P.A. of the first CM of Chhattisgarh shree Ajit Jogi during the partition of MP and CH. He was an MLA from Mhow Vidhan Sabha constituency two times from 1998 to 2008, before its delimitation in 2008.

== Political views ==
He has belonged to the Bhartiya Janta Party since 15 March 2024 party.

== See also ==
- Madhya Pradesh Legislative Assembly
- 2013 Madhya Pradesh Legislative Assembly election
- 2008 Madhya Pradesh Legislative Assembly election
- 2003 Madhya Pradesh Legislative Assembly election
- 1998 Madhya Pradesh Legislative Assembly election
