= Dr. Ambedkar Nagar-Mhow Assembly constituency =

Constituency of the Madhya Pradesh legislative assembly in India

Coordinates: 22.55°N 75.76°E

Dr. Ambedkar Nagar-Mhow
- Constituency No. 209 for the Madhya Pradesh Legislative Assembly

Constituency details
- Country: India
- Region: Central India
- State: Madhya Pradesh
- District: Indore
- Lok Sabha constituency: Dhar
- Reservation: None

Member of Legislative Assembly
- 16th Madhya Pradesh Legislative Assembly
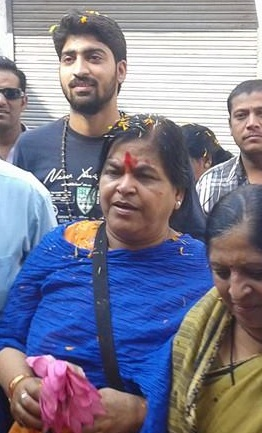
- Incumbent Usha Thakur
- Party: Bharatiya Janata Party
- Elected year: 2023
- Preceded by: Kailash Vijayvargiya

Dr. Ambedkar Nagar-Mhow Assembly constituency is one of the 230 Vidhan Sabha (Legislative Assembly) constituencies of Madhya Pradesh state in central India.

== Overview ==
Dr. Ambedkar Nagar-Mhow (constituency number 209) is one of the 8 Vidhan Sabha constituencies located in Indore district and is part of Indore district which comes under Dhar constituency.

== Members of Legislative Assembly ==
=== Madhya Bharat Legislative Assembly ===
Election	Member	Party
1952	Rustamji Kawasaji Jall	Indian National Congress

=== Madhya Pradesh Legislative Assembly ===
Election	Member	Party
1957	Rustamji Kawasaji Jall	Indian National Congress
1962	Rustamji Kawasaji Jall	Indian National Congress
1967	Rustamji Kawasaji Jall	Indian National Congress
1972	Prakash Chand Sethi	Indian National Congress
1977	Ghanshyam Seth Patidar	Indian National Congress
1980	Ghanshyam Seth Patidar	Indian National Congress (Indira)
1985	Bherulal Patidar	Bharatiya Janata Party
1990	Bherulal Patidar	Bharatiya Janata Party
1993	Bherulal Patidar	Bharatiya Janata Party
1998	Antar Singh Darbar	Indian National Congress
2003	Antar Singh Darbar	Indian National Congress
2008	Kailash Vijayvargiya	Bharatiya Janata Party
2013	Kailash Vijayvargiya	Bharatiya Janata Party
2018	Usha Thakur	Bharatiya Janata Party
2023	Usha Thakur	Bharatiya Janata Party

== Election results ==
=== 2023 ===
2023 Madhya Pradesh Legislative Assembly election: Dr. Ambedkar Nagar-Mhow
Party	Candidate	Votes	%	±%
BJP	Usha Thakur	102,989	47.1	−2.76
Independent	Antar Singh Darbar	68,597	31.37	
INC	Ram Kishore Shukla	29,144	13.33	−32.85
Independent	Pradeep Mavi Jays	11,394	5.21	
NOTA	None of the above	1,553	0.71	−0.36
Majority		34,392	15.73	+12.05
Turnout		218,667	77.89	−1.41
BJP hold		Swing		

=== 2018 ===
2018 Madhya Pradesh Legislative Assembly election: Dr. Ambedkar Nagar-Mhow
Party	Candidate	Votes	%	±%
BJP	Usha Thakur	97,009	49.86	
INC	Antar Singh Darbar	89,852	46.18	
NOTA	None of the above	2,073	1.07	
Majority		7,157	3.68	
Turnout		194,567	79.3	
BJP hold		Swing		

=== 2013 ===
2013 Madhya Pradesh Legislative Assembly election: Dr. Ambedkar Nagar-Mhow
Party	Candidate	Votes	%	±%
BJP	Kailash Vijayvargiya	89,848	51.85	
INC	Antar Singh Darbar	77,632	44.80	
CPI(M)	Arun Singh Chauhan	1,092	0.63	
BSP	Premchand Taank	870	0.50	
IND.	Onkar Singh Katare	646	0.37	
NOTA	None of the Above	2,248	1.30	
Majority		12,216	7.05	
Turnout		1,73,279	78.34	
BJP hold		Swing		

=== 2008 ===
2008 Madhya Pradesh Legislative Assembly election: Dr. Ambedkar Nagar-Mhow
Party	Candidate	Votes	%	±%
BJP	Kailash Vijayvargiya	67,192	51.55	
INC	Antar Singh Darbar	57,401	44.04	
CPI(M)	Arun Singh Chauhan	1,603	1.23	
IND.	Mohammad Sadiq	1,450	1.11	
BSP	Rajesh Nagrale	1,043	0.80	
Majority		9,791	7.51	
Turnout		1,30,349	77.17	
BJP win (new seat)				

== See also ==
- Dr. Ambedkar Nagar
- Indore
- Dhar (Lok Sabha constituency)
