= Ichhawar =

Ichhawar Echawur
- Town
- Location in Madhya Pradesh, India Ichhawar (India)
- Coordinates: 23.02°N 77.02°E
- Country: India
- State: Madhya Pradesh
- District: Sehore

Government
  - Body: Nagar Parishad Ichhwaar
  - MLA: karan Singh Verma (BJP)
  - Ex. MLA: Shailendra Patel (INC)
  - Mayor: Mr. Devendra Verma (BJP)
- Elevation: 492 m (1,614 ft)

Population (2011)
  - Total: 15,221

Languages
  - Official: Hindi
- Time zone: UTC+5:30 (IST)
- PIN: 466115
- Telephone code: 07561
- Vehicle registration: MP37

Ichhawar is a town, and a Municipal Council in Sehore district in the Indian state of Madhya Pradesh. Ichhawar is near Bhopal state capital. Nearest railway station sehore. Nearest airport Bhopal.

== Demographics ==
As of the 2011 Census of India, Ichhawar had a population of 15,221. Males constitute 52% of the population, and females 48%. Ichhawar has an average literacy rate of 67%, lower than the national average of 74.04%: male literacy is 80%, and female literacy is 71%. In Ichhawar, 12% of the population is under 6 years of age.

== Geography ==
Ichhawar is located at 23.02°N 77.02°E. It has an average elevation of 492 metres (1,614 feet). Ichhawar is a lush green town. It is well known for its Sharbati variety of wheat and soybean. Recent development of interest for Kabli Chana between farmers led to ample production of the product in the area. The mango and orange gardens of some farmers are a lucrative attraction.

== History ==
Shri Kesarimal Jain was the first MLA of Madhya Pradesh Legislative Assembly from Ichhawar Assembly constituency.

Ichhawar witnessed a historical political event on 8 December 2013 when the sitting MLA and Minister Karan Singh Verma of BJP of 23 years lost the election by only 700+ votes to the younger Shailendra Patel of Indian National Congress. Karan Singh Verma of Bharatiya Janata Party reclaimed his seat in the 2018 Assembly Elections by margin of 15,869 votes and again in 2023 Karan Singh Verma won Ichhawar (2023) by a margin of 16,346 votes.
