= Indore-3 Assembly constituency =

Constituency of the Madhya Pradesh legislative assembly in India

Coordinates: 22.717°N 75.861°E

Indore-3
- Constituency No. 206 for the Madhya Pradesh Legislative Assembly

Constituency details
- Country: India
- Region: Central India
- State: Madhya Pradesh
- District: Indore
- Lok Sabha constituency: Indore
- Established: 1967
- Reservation: None

Member of Legislative Assembly
- 16th Madhya Pradesh Legislative Assembly
- Incumbent Golu Shukla
- Party: Bharatiya Janata Party
- Elected year: 2023
- Preceded by: Akash Vijayvargiya

Indore-3 Assembly constituency is one of the 230 Vidhan Sabha (Legislative Assembly) constituencies of Madhya Pradesh state in central India.

== Overview ==
Indore-3 Assembly constituency is one of the 8 Vidhan Sabha constituencies located in Indore district which comes under Indore (Lok Sabha constituency). The constituency includes Ward Numbers 55, 56, 57, 58, 59, 60, 61, 62, 63 & 64 of Indore city.

== Members of the Legislative Assembly ==
Year	Name	Party
1967	Kalyan Jain	Samyukta Socialist Party
1972	Chandra Prabha Shekhar	Indian National Congress
1977	Rajendra Dharkar	Janata Party
1980	Mahesh Joshi	Indian National Congress (I)
1985	Mahesh Joshi	Indian National Congress
1990	Gopi Krishna Nema	Bharatiya Janata Party
1993	Gopi Krishna Nema	Bharatiya Janata Party
1998	Ashwin Joshi	Indian National Congress
2003	Ashwin Joshi	Indian National Congress
2008	Ashwin Joshi	Indian National Congress
2013	Usha Thakur	Bharatiya Janata Party
2018	Akash Vijayvargiya	Bharatiya Janata Party
2023	Golu Shukla	Bharatiya Janata Party

== Election results ==
=== 2023 ===
2023 Madhya Pradesh Legislative Assembly election
Party	Candidate	Votes	%	±%
BJP	Golu Shukla	73,541	54.61	+3.65
INC	Pintu Joshi	58,784	43.65	−2.94
NOTA	None of the above	1,117	0.83	−0.27
Majority		14,757	10.96	+6.59
Turnout		134,672	71.92	+1.63
BJP hold		Swing		

=== 2018 ===
2018 Madhya Pradesh Legislative Assembly election: Indore-3
Party	Candidate	Votes	%	±%
BJP	Akash Vijayvargiya	67,075	50.96	
INC	Ashwin Joshi	61,324	46.59	
NOTA	None of the above	1,447	1.1	
Majority		5,751	4.37	
Turnout		131,625	70.29	
BJP gain from		Swing		

=== 1998 ===
1998 Madhya Pradesh Legislative Assembly election: Indore-3
Party	Candidate	Votes	%	±%
INC	Ashwin Joshi	26,657	52.54	
BJP	Gopikrishna Nema	23,527	46.37	
RPI	Dinkarrao Ambore	179	0.35	
Independent	Daulat	145	0.29	
Independent	Dhanraj Kajare	50	0.10	
Majority		3,130	6.17	
Turnout		50,736	59.96	
INC gain from BJP		Swing		

== See also ==
- Indore
- Indore (Lok Sabha constituency)
