= Thakurdas Nagwanshi =

Indian politician

Member of the Madhya Pradesh Legislative Assembly
- Incumbent
- Assumed office 2008
- Constituency: Pipariya

Personal details
- Political party: Bharatiya Janata Party
- Profession: Politician

Thakurdas Nagwanshi is an Indian politician from Madhya Pradesh. He is a four time elected Member of the Madhya Pradesh Legislative Assembly from 2008, 2013, 2018, and 2023, representing Pipariya Assembly constituency as a Member of the Bharatiya Janata Party.

== See also ==
- List of chief ministers of Madhya Pradesh
- Madhya Pradesh Legislative Assembly
