= Narela Bazyaft =

- village
- Location within Madhya Pradesh Location within India
- Coordinates: 23.5915082°N 77.4329048°E
- Country: India
- State: Madhya Pradesh
- District: Bhopal
- Tehsil: Berasia
- Elevation: 490 m (1,610 ft)

Population (2011)
  - Total: 913
- Time zone: UTC+5:30 (IST)
- ISO 3166 code: MP-IN
- 2011 census code: 482255

Narela Bazyaft is a village in the Bhopal district of Madhya Pradesh, India. It is located in the Berasia tehsil.

== Demographics ==
According to the 2011 census of India, Narela Bazyaft has 208 households. The effective literacy rate (i.e. the literacy rate of population excluding children aged 6 and below) is 82.79%.

Demographics (2011 Census)
	Total	Male	Female
Population	913	463	450
Children aged below 6 years	152	82	70
Scheduled caste	303	153	150
Scheduled tribe	13	9	4
Literates	630	345	285
Workers (all)	490	249	241
Main workers (total)	267	239	28
Main workers: Cultivators	125	119	6
Main workers: Agricultural labourers	8	3	5
Main workers: Household industry workers	0	0	0
Main workers: Other	134	117	17
Marginal workers (total)	223	10	213
Marginal workers: Cultivators	3	2	1
Marginal workers: Agricultural labourers	202	3	199
Marginal workers: Household industry workers	0	0	0
Marginal workers: Others	18	5	13
Non-workers	423	214	209
