= Narela Damodar =

- village
- Location within Madhya Pradesh Location within India
- Coordinates: 23.671394°N 77.598854°E
- Country: India
- State: Madhya Pradesh
- District: Bhopal
- Tehsil: Berasia

Population (2011)
  - Total: 825
- Time zone: UTC+5:30 (IST)
- ISO 3166 code: MP-IN
- Census code: 482180

Narela Damodar is a village in the Bhopal district of Madhya Pradesh, India. It is located in the Berasia tehsil.

== Demographics ==
According to the 2011 census of India, Narela Damodar has 149 households. The effective literacy rate (i.e. the literacy rate of population excluding children aged 6 and below) is 74.31%.

Demographics (2011 Census)
	Total	Male	Female
Population	825	453	372
Children aged below 6 years	136	67	69
Scheduled caste	229	125	104
Scheduled tribe	0	0	0
Literates	512	314	198
Workers (all)	371	234	137
Main workers (total)	358	229	129
Main workers: Cultivators	172	151	21
Main workers: Agricultural labourers	180	73	107
Main workers: Household industry workers	2	2	0
Main workers: Other	4	3	1
Marginal workers (total)	13	5	8
Marginal workers: Cultivators	4	3	1
Marginal workers: Agricultural labourers	9	2	7
Marginal workers: Household industry workers	0	0	0
Marginal workers: Others	0	0	0
Non-workers	454	219	235
