= Nira Narsingpur =

Village in Maharashtra

Nira-Narsingpur
- village
- Location in Maharashtra, India Nira-Narsingpur (India)
- Coordinates: 17.98350°N 75.12396°E
- Country: India
- State: Maharashtra
- District: Pune district
- Talukas: Indapur taluka

Languages
  - Official: Marathi
- Time zone: UTC+5:30 (IST)

Nira Narsingpur is a village in Indapur taluka of Pune district, Maharashtra, India. The confluence of rivers Bhima and Nira is behind the Shri Laxmi Narsimha Temple. The temple is situated on Pune side of the Pune-Solapur district border also on the common point of three Talukas Madha, Malashiras (both from Solapur district) and Indapur (Pune district). The temple is the Kuldaiwat (Family deity) for a number of Marathi families of different castes.
