= Shailendra Patel =

Indian politician

Member of the Madhya Pradesh Legislative Assembly
- In office 2013–2018
- Preceded by: Karan Singh Verma
- Constituency: Ichhawar

Personal details
- Born: 15 May 1976 (age 49) Sehore
- Citizenship: India
- Party: Indian National Congress
- Spouse: Pragya
- Education: M. Com., LLB
- Alma mater: Barkatullah University
- Profession: Politician

Shailendra Patel is an Indian politician of the Indian National Congress party from Madhya Pradesh. He lost the Vidhansabha election.

== Political career ==
He became an MLA of the Madhya Pradesh Legislative Assembly in 2013.

In 2017 he confronted Chief Minister of Madhya Pradesh Shivraj Singh Chouhan over why he did not visit Ichhawar, since he became the CM in 2005.

Patel was candidate for 2019 Indian general election from Vidisha (Lok Sabha constituency).

== See also ==
- Madhya Pradesh Legislative Assembly
- 2013 Madhya Pradesh Legislative Assembly election
- 2008 Madhya Pradesh Legislative Assembly election
