= Narela Bazyafth =

- village
- Location within Madhya Pradesh Location within India
- Coordinates: 23.1856414°N 77.5728675°E
- Country: India
- State: Madhya Pradesh
- District: Bhopal
- Tehsil: Huzur
- Elevation: 442 m (1,450 ft)

Population (2011)
  - Total: 21
- Time zone: UTC+5:30 (IST)
- ISO 3166 code: MP-IN
- 2011 census code: 482446

Narela Bazyafth is a village in the Bhopal district of Madhya Pradesh, India. It is located in the Huzur tehsil and the Phanda block.

== Demographics ==
According to the 2011 census of India, Narela Bazyafth has 5 households. The effective literacy rate (i.e. the literacy rate of population excluding children aged 6 and below) is 66.67%.

Demographics (2011 Census)
	Total	Male	Female
Population	21	10	11
Children aged below 6 years	9	4	5
Scheduled caste	0	0	0
Scheduled tribe	0	0	0
Literates	8	4	4
Workers (all)	5	5	0
Main workers (total)	5	5	0
Main workers: Cultivators	5	5	0
Main workers: Agricultural labourers	0	0	0
Main workers: Household industry workers	0	0	0
Main workers: Other	0	0	0
Marginal workers (total)	0	0	0
Marginal workers: Cultivators	0	0	0
Marginal workers: Agricultural labourers	0	0	0
Marginal workers: Household industry workers	0	0	0
Marginal workers: Others	0	0	0
Non-workers	16	5	11
