= Narayan Singh Patta =

Indian politician

Member of Madhya Pradesh Legislative Assembly
- In office 2008–2013
- Preceded by: Pandit Singh Dhurwey
- Constituency: Bichhiya
- Incumbent
- Assumed office 2018
- Constituency: Bichhiya

Personal details
- Party: Indian National Congress
- Profession: Politician

Narayan Singh Patta is an Indian politician from Madhya Pradesh. He is a three time elected Member of the Madhya Pradesh Legislative Assembly from 2008, 2018, and 2023, representing Bichhiya Assembly constituency as a Member of the Indian National Congress.

== See also ==
- 2023 Madhya Pradesh Legislative Assembly election
- Madhya Pradesh Legislative Assembly
