= Ajay Vishnoi =

Indian politician

Member of Madhya Pradesh Legislative Assembly
- In office 2008–2013
- Preceded by: Sobaran Singh
- Constituency: Patan, Madhya Pradesh
- Incumbent
- Assumed office 2018
- Preceded by: Neelesh Awasthi
- Constituency: Patan, Madhya Pradesh

Personal details
- Party: Bharatiya Janata Party
- Profession: Politician

Ajay Vishnoi is an Indian politician from Madhya Pradesh. He is a three time Member of the Madhya Pradesh Legislative Assembly from 2008, 2018, and 2023, representing Patan, Madhya Pradesh Assembly constituency as a Member of the Bharatiya Janata Party.

== See also ==
- List of chief ministers of Madhya Pradesh
- Madhya Pradesh Legislative Assembly
