= Karan Singh Verma =

Indian politician

Member of the Madhya Pradesh Legislative Assembly
- In office 1985–2013
- Preceded by: Shailendra Patel
- Constituency: Ichhawar
- Incumbent
- Assumed office 2018
- Constituency: Ichhawar
- Preceded by: Shailendra Patel

Personal details
- Party: Bharatiya Janata Party
- Profession: Politician

Karan Singh Verma is an Indian politician from Madhya Pradesh who serving as revenue minister. He is an eight time elected Member of the Madhya Pradesh Legislative Assembly from 1985, 1990, 1993, 1998, 2003, 2008, 2018 and 2023, representing Ichhawar Assembly constituency as a Member of the Bharatiya Janata Party.

== See also ==
- List of chief ministers of Madhya Pradesh
- Madhya Pradesh Legislative Assembly
