= Rajendra Dharkar =

Indian politician

Rajendra Nilkanth Dharkar was an Indian politician and member of the Bharatiya Janata Party. Dharkar was a member of the Madhya Pradesh Legislative Assembly from the Indore-3 constituency in Indore district.
