= Ranjana Baghel =

Indian politician

Cabinet Minister of Women and Child Development
- Incumbent
- Assumed office 2008
- Preceded by: Dariyav Singh Solanki
- Succeeded by: Maya Singh
- Constituency: Dhar

Personal details
- Born: Dhar district, Madhya Pradesh, India
- Party: Bharatiya Janata Party
- Spouse: Mukam Singh Kirade
- Education: M.A., Political Science, Indore
- Alma mater: Indore University, Indore

Ranjana Baghel is a Bharatiya Janata Party politician from Madhya Pradesh. She is a member of Madhya Pradesh Legislative Assembly and has served as minister for women and child welfare of the state.

On 20 December 2008 she was elected as MLA after winning Legislative Assembly elections in Manawar (Dhar) with 11,021 votes. She was a cabinet minister in Government of Madhya Pradesh holding the portfolio of Women and Child Development.

== See also ==
- Sixteenth Legislative Assembly of Uttar Pradesh
- Uttar Pradesh Legislative Assembly
