= Narela Hanumant Singh =

- village
- Location within Madhya Pradesh Location within India
- Coordinates: 23.120617°N 77.477957°E
- Country: India
- State: Madhya Pradesh
- District: Bhopal
- Tehsil: Huzur

Population (2011)
  - Total: 467
- Time zone: UTC+5:30 (IST)
- ISO 3166 code: MP-IN
- Census code: 482560

Narela Hanumant Singh is a village in the Bhopal district of Madhya Pradesh, India. It is located in the Huzur tehsil and the Phanda block. It is located on the banks of Kaliasot River.

== Demographics ==
According to the 2011 census of India, Narela Hanumant Singh has 88 households. The effective literacy rate (i.e. the literacy rate of population excluding children aged 6 and below) is 79.51%.

Demographics (2011 Census)
	Total	Male	Female
Population	467	233	234
Children aged below 6 years	57	29	28
Scheduled caste	120	59	61
Scheduled tribe	42	22	20
Literates	326	175	151
Workers (all)	134	129	5
Main workers (total)	132	127	5
Main workers: Cultivators	47	46	1
Main workers: Agricultural labourers	51	48	3
Main workers: Household industry workers	4	4	0
Main workers: Other	30	29	1
Marginal workers (total)	2	2	0
Marginal workers: Cultivators	0	0	0
Marginal workers: Agricultural labourers	1	1	0
Marginal workers: Household industry workers	0	0	0
Marginal workers: Others	1	1	0
Non-workers	333	104	229
