= Harvansh Singh =

Indian politician

- Born: 11 November 1949.
- Died: 14 May 2013
- Education: Graduate : Commerce and Law. Post Graduate: Degree in Art.
- Occupation: Farmer/Politician

Harvansh Singh (11 November 1949 – 14 May 2013) was an Indian politician.

He was born in the village of Bindrai, Chhindwara district, Madhya Pradesh state, India. He was a farmer by profession, and held a graduate degree in Commerce & Law and a postgraduate degree in Arts.

Singh initially held the position of President of the Seoni district Youth Congress Committee in 1971. He then was the vice-president of MP State Handloom from 1983 to 1986, and chairman from 1986 to 1988. He was president of Pradesh Congress Sevadal from 1986 to 1989, and became chairman of Madhya Pradesh Textile Corporation.

Singh then had a long career in politics. He became General Secretary of the Madhya Pradesh Congress Committee in 1992. In 1993, Singh was elected a member of the Madhya Pradesh Legislative Assembly from Keolari constituency. He held the key portfolios of Public Health Engineering, Transport, and the Home department. He was also a Cabinet minister during the Digvijaya Singh Government in the state.

== Death ==
Singh died of a heart attack on 14 May 2013. He is survived by his wife Pawan Bai and three children.
