= Usha Thakur =

Indian politician

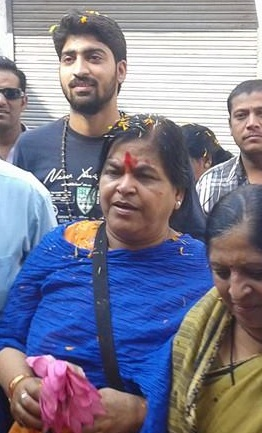
- Usha in 2013

Cabinet Minister, Madhya Pradesh Government
- In office 2 July 2020 -2023
- Chief Minister: Shivraj Singh Chouhan
- Ministry and Departments: Tourism; Culture & Adhyatm
- Preceded by: Vijayalaxmi Sadho; Surendra Singh Baghel

Member of the Madhya Pradesh Legislative Assembly
- Incumbent
- Assumed office December 2018
- Preceded by: Kailash Vijayvargiya
- Constituency: Mhow
- Majority: 97,009 (49.86%)
- In office 2013 – December 2018
- Succeeded by: Akash Vijayvargiya
- Constituency: Indore-3
- In office 2003–2008
- Succeeded by: Sudarshan Gupta
- Constituency: Indore-1

Personal details
- Born: Indore, Madhya Pradesh
- Party: Bharatiya Janata Party

Usha Thakur is an Indian politician and a member of Madhya Pradesh Legislative Assembly. She belongs to Bharatiya Janata Party. She is the former Cabinet Minister in the Government of Madhya Pradesh.

== Early life and education ==
Usha Thakur was born in Indore in an average middle-class family. She developed interest in poetry and Hindi literature from childhood and later pursued an M.A. in History. She also sings Bhajan in religious ceremonies and is very vocal on her views on women.

== Controversies ==
Usha Thakur courted controversy by supporting banning of Muslim youths from Navratra Garba venues, alleging that Muslim youths court Hindu girls with a ploy to convert them to Islam. She also urged all the garba organizers in her constituency to verify the identities of all the entrants using their voter IDs.

On 25 September 2015, she said that Muslims should sacrifice their sons instead of goats if they value the qurbani festival.
