= Patan, Madhya Pradesh Assembly constituency =

Constituency of the Madhya Pradesh Legislative Assembly in India

Coordinates: 23.29°N 79.69°E

Patan
- Constituency No. 95 for the Madhya Pradesh Legislative Assembly

Constituency details
- Country: India
- Region: Central India
- State: Madhya Pradesh
- District: Jabalpur
- Lok Sabha constituency: Jabalpur
- Established: 1977
- Total electors: 235,091
- Reservation: None

Member of Legislative Assembly
- 16th Madhya Pradesh Legislative Assembly
- Incumbent Ajay Vishnoi
- Party: Bharatiya Janata Party
- Elected year: 2023
- Preceded by: Neelesh Awasthi

Patan is one of the 230 Madhya Pradesh Legislative Assembly constituencies of Madhya Pradesh state in central India. It is a segment of the Jabalpur (Lok Sabha constituency) and is in Jabalpur district. After the last delimitation in 2007, the constituency comprises the Majholi and Patan tehsils of Jabalpur district.

== Members of the Legislative Assembly ==
Year	Member	Party
1952	Nek Narayan Singh	Indian National Congress
1957	Deva Devi	Indian National Congress
1962	Narain Prasad	Indian National Congress
1967	Ashalata	Indian National Congress
1972	Motilal Sonkar	Indian National Congress
1977	Jaswant Singh Tomar	Indian National Congress
1980	Thakur Raghuraj Singh Tomar	Indian National Congress (Indira)
1985	Priyadarshan Dharmadhikari	Indian National Congress
1990	Kalyani Pandey	Indian National Congress
1993	Ramnaresh Tripathy	Bharatiya Janata Party
1998	Sobaran Singh	Janata Dal
2003	Sobaran Singh	Indian National Congress
2008	Ajay Vishnoi	Bharatiya Janata Party
2013	Neelesh Awasthi	Indian National Congress
2018	Ajay Vishnoi	Bharatiya Janata Party
2023	Ajay Vishnoi	Bharatiya Janata Party

== Election results ==
=== 2023 ===
2023 Madhya Pradesh Legislative Assembly election: Patan
Party	Candidate	Votes	%	±%
BJP	Ajay Vishnoi	113,223	54.21	+0.25
INC	Neelesh Awasthi	82,968	39.72	+0.11
BSP	Tan Singh Thakur	3,236	1.55	+0.64
NOTA	None of the above	541	0.26	−1.45
Majority		30,255	14.49	+0.14
Turnout		208,863	81.11	+1.92
BJP hold		Swing		

=== 2018 ===
2018 Madhya Pradesh Legislative Assembly election: Patan
Party	Candidate	Votes	%	±%
BJP	Ajay Vishnoi	100,443	53.96	
INC	Neelesh Awasthi	73,731	39.61	
Independent	Saket Shrivastava	2,442	1.31	
BSP	Rajkumar Patel	1,691	0.91	
NOTA	None of the above	3,180	1.71	
Majority		26,712	14.35	
Turnout		186,159	79.19	

== See also ==
- List of constituencies of the Madhya Pradesh Legislative Assembly
- Jabalpur district
