= Vijayraghvendra Singh =

Indian politician

Member of Madhya Pradesh Legislative Assembly
- In office 2018–2023
- Constituency: Barwara

Personal details
- Political party: Indian National Congress
- Profession: Politician

Vijayraghvendra Singh is an Indian politician from Madhya Pradesh. He is a Member of the Madhya Pradesh Legislative Assembly from 2018, representing Barwara Assembly constituency as a Member of the Indian National Congress.

== See also ==
- List of chief ministers of Madhya Pradesh
- Madhya Pradesh Legislative Assembly
