= Ghatiya =

Town in Madhya Pradesh, India

- Town
- Location within Madhya Pradesh Location within India
- Coordinates: 23.3783440°N 75.8641147°E
- Country: India
- State: Madhya Pradesh
- District: Ujjain district
- Time zone: UTC+5:30 (IST)

Ghatiya is a Town and Tehsil Headquarter in Ujjain District of Madhya Pradesh. It is the main town of Ghatiya Assembly constituency, one the 230 assembly constituencies of Madhya Pradesh.

== Demographics ==
As per the Census of India 2011, Ghatiya village has population of 6,312 of which 3 203 are males and 3,109 are females. The population of children between age 0-6 is 44 which is 12.5% of total population.
