= Narela, Bhopal =

Narela
- village
- Location within Madhya Pradesh Location within India
- Coordinates: 23.164763°N 77.2577571°E
- Country: India
- State: Madhya Pradesh
- District: Bhopal
- Tehsil: Huzur
- Elevation: 522 m (1,713 ft)

Population (2011)
  - Total: 959
- Time zone: UTC+5:30 (IST)
- ISO 3166 code: MP-IN
- 2011 census code: 482495

Narela is a village in the Bhopal district of Madhya Pradesh, India. It is located in the Huzur tehsil and the Phanda block.

== Demographics ==
According to the 2011 census of India, Narela has 174 households. The effective literacy rate (i.e. the literacy rate of population excluding children aged 6 and below) is 72.76%.

Demographics (2011 Census)
	Total	Male	Female
Population	959	513	446
Children aged below 6 years	122	75	47
Scheduled caste	44	22	22
Scheduled tribe	0	0	0
Literates	609	375	234
Workers (all)	367	241	126
Main workers (total)	333	220	113
Main workers: Cultivators	279	178	101
Main workers: Agricultural labourers	3	0	3
Main workers: Household industry workers	3	3	0
Main workers: Other	48	39	9
Marginal workers (total)	34	21	13
Marginal workers: Cultivators	3	1	2
Marginal workers: Agricultural labourers	30	19	11
Marginal workers: Household industry workers	0	0	0
Marginal workers: Others	1	1	0
Non-workers	592	272	320
