= Gopi Krishna Nema =

Indian politician

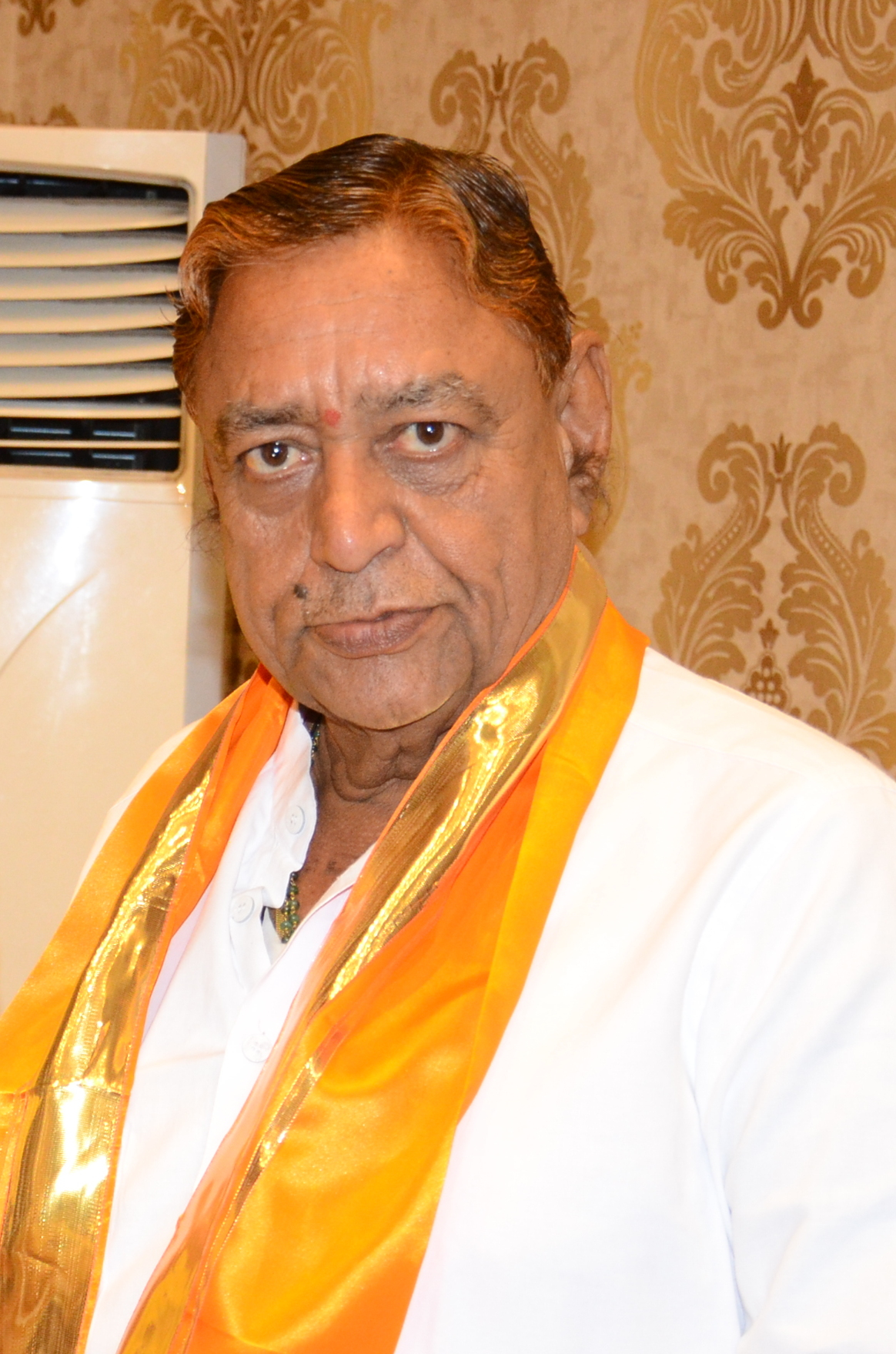

Member of Legislative Assembly, Madhya Pradesh
- In office 1990–1998
- Succeeded by: Ashwin Joshi
- Constituency: Indore-3

President of Bharatiya Janata Party, Indore
- In office August 2018 – 9 May 2020
- State President: Rakesh Singh
- Preceded by: Kailash Sharma
- Succeeded by: Gaurav Ranadive

Personal details
- Born: Indore, Madhya Pradesh
- Party: Bharatiya Janata Party

Gopi Krishna Nema is an Indian politician and member of the Bharatiya Janata Party. Nema is a former member of the Madhya Pradesh Legislative Assembly from the Indore-3 constituency in Indore district. In August 2018, Nema was appointed the president of BJP for Indore city.
