= Ramlal Malviya =

Indian politician

Ramlal Malviya is an Indian politician and member of the Indian National Congress. Malviya is a member of the Madhya Pradesh Legislative Assembly from the Ghatiya constituency in Ujjain district.
