= Keolari =

- City
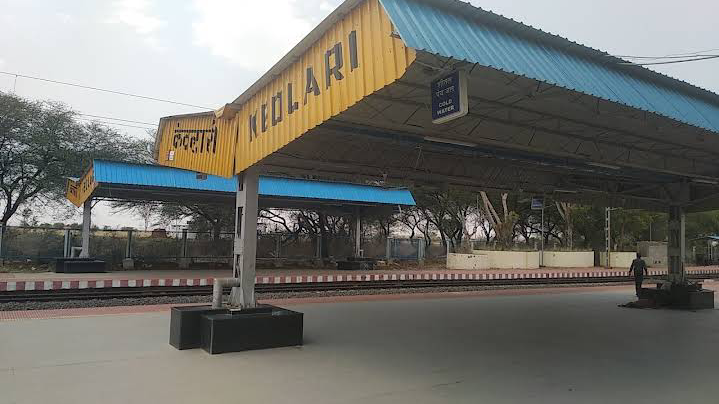

- Location in Madhya Pradesh, India Keolari (India)
- Coordinates: 22.37°N 79.90°E
- Country: India
- State: Madhya Pradesh
- District: Seoni

Government
  - Type: Municipality
  - Body: President of Municipality

Population
  - Total: 20,000

Languages
  - Official: Hindi
- Time zone: UTC+5:30 (IST)
- PIN: 480994
- Telephone code: 07694
- ISO 3166 code: IN-MP
- Vehicle registration: MP-22
- Climate: Aw
- Website: dietkeolari.nic.in

Keolari is a City and a Tehsil in Seoni district in the state of Madhya Pradesh, India. The confluence of the Wainganga and Sagar rivers is located at Keolari. The city has a District Institute of Education Training. (D.I.E.T.).

== Geography ==
Keolari is named after a kind of paddy "keolar" which was profusely produced in this region. The town has an average elevation of 447 metres (1466 feet). It is located at the absolute center of the country.

== Demographics ==
As of 2001 India census, Keolari had a population of 8,840. Males constitute 4,495, 50.84% of the population and females 4,345, 49.15%. As per district government, Keolari has an average literacy rate of 69.16%, higher than the national average of 59.5%: male literacy is 79.82%, and female literacy is 58.47%. Schools in Keolari include Deep Jyoti Public Higher Secondary School, Bhartiya Gyan Peeth, Saraswati Shishu Mandir, Ramanujan Convent School, Excellence School (formerly Govt. Boys Hr. Sec. School), Gov. Girls Hr. Sec. School, St. Norbert's School and others.

Excellence School in Keolari

DIET Keolari

== Civic administration ==
Keolari is a tehsil. It is administered by Keolari Municipality. The town is divided into 15 wards. Each ward is represented by a ward member or Parshad. The SDM court has been working since 1998 and now it has Civil Court.

== Climate ==
The city has the typical hot and dry temperate of the Great Indian Plateau. Keolari is hot during summers with temperatures up to 44 degrees Celsius but the winters are quite comfortable. From the July to September months bring heavy rains with the onset of the South Western monsoon. The October to March window during the winters is suitable for a visit to the city.

== Transport ==
=== Rail ===
Keolari is a railway station on the railway line between Jabalpur to the north and Gondia / Balaghat to the south. It is connected to Nagpur via Chhindwara, Nainpur and Mandla via rail.

=== Road ===
It is connected to Mandla, Seoni, Nagpur, Jabalpur and Balaghat by roads. Between Mandla and Keolari is a small village "Chirai Dongri", from where there is access to Kanha Kislee, a well-known national park. There are picnic spots at Sangam, Siddhaghat, and other locations. It is known for its two Khermai (choti and badi). Siddhaghat has small marble rocks just like Bhedhaghat in Jabalpur. The river Wanganga cut through the rocks here.

=== Air ===
The nearest airports are at Jabalpur (135 km) and Nagpur (180 km).
