= Mohan Yadav ministry =

2023 cabinet of Madhya Pradesh, India

- 34th Ministry of Madhya Pradesh

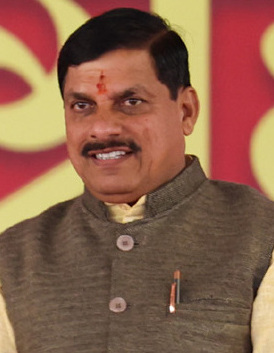
- Dr Mohan Yadav
- Date formed: 13 December 2023
- Date dissolved: Incumbent

People and organisations
- Governor: Mangubhai C. Patel
- Chief Minister: Dr Mohan Yadav
- Deputy Chief Ministers: Rajendra Shukla; Jagdish Devda
- No. of ministers: 31
- Total no. of members: 32
- Member parties: BJP
- Status in legislature: Majority
- Opposition party: Indian National Congress
- Opposition leader: Umang Singhar

History
- Election: 2023
- Outgoing election: 2023
- Legislature term: 5 years
- Predecessor: Fourth Chouhan ministry
- Successor: Incumbent

The Mohan Yadav ministry represents the formation of the Thirty-Fourth cabinet of the Indian state Madhya Pradesh under the leadership of Mohan Yadav, who was elected as the Nineteenth Chief Minister of Madhya Pradesh. The Bharatiya Janata Party (BJP), led by Mohan Yadav, secured an absolute majority in the 2023 Madhya Pradesh Legislative Assembly election, winning 163 out of the 230 seats in the state assembly.

== Council of Ministers ==
=== Cabinet Ministers ===
On 25 December 2023, Chief Minister Mohan Yadav inducted 28 ministers into his council of ministers.

| Portfolio | Minister | Took office | Left office | Party |
|---|---|---|---|---|
| Chief Minister: General Administration; Home; Public Relations; Jails; Mining; Aviation; Industrial Policies; Investment Promotion; And all other departments not specifically assigned to any minister. | Mohan Yadav | 13 December 2023 | Incumbent | BJP |
| Deputy Chief Minister: Public Health; Medical Education | Rajendra Shukla | 13 December 2023 | Incumbent | BJP |
| Deputy Chief Minister: Finance; Commercial Tax | Jagdish Devda | 13 December 2023 | Incumbent | BJP |
| Panchayat and Rural Development | Prahlad Singh Patel | 25 December 2023 | Incumbent | BJP |
| Public Works | Rakesh Singh | 25 December 2023 | Incumbent | BJP |
| Transport; School Education | Uday Pratap Singh | 25 December 2023 | Incumbent | BJP |
| Urban Development; Housing; Parliamentary Affairs | Kailash Vijayvargiya | 25 December 2023 | Incumbent | BJP |
| Sports and Youth Affairs; Co-operatives | Vishvas Sarang | 25 December 2023 | Incumbent | BJP |
| Energy | Pradhuman Singh Tomar | 25 December 2023 | Incumbent | BJP |
| Water Resources | Tulsi Ram Silawat | 25 December 2023 | Incumbent | BJP |
| Farmers' Welfare; Agricultural Development | Adal Singh Kansana | 25 December 2023 | Incumbent | BJP |
| Social Justice; Horticulture; Food Processing | Narayan Singh Kushwah | 25 December 2023 | Incumbent | BJP |
| Tribal Affairs; Public Assets Management; Bhopal Gas Tragedy Relief and Rehabilitation | Kunwar Vijay Shah | 25 December 2023 | Incumbent | BJP |
| Revenue | Karan Singh Verma | 25 December 2023 | Incumbent | BJP |
| Public Health Engineering | Sampatiya Uikey | 25 December 2023 | Incumbent | BJP |
| Women and Child Development | Nirmala Bhuria | 25 December 2023 | Incumbent | BJP |
| Food and Civil Supplies | Govind Singh Rajput | 25 December 2023 | Incumbent | BJP |
| Higher Education; Technical Education | Inder Singh Parmar | 25 December 2023 | Incumbent | BJP |
| Scheduled Castes Welfare | Nagar Singh Chouhan | 25 December 2023 | Incumbent | BJP |
| Micro, Small and Medium Enterprises | Chetanya Kasyap | 25 December 2023 | Incumbent | BJP |
| New & Renewable Energy | Rakesh Shukla | 25 December 2023 | Incumbent | BJP |
| Forest And Environment | Ramnivas Rawat | 8 July 2024 | 4 December 2024 | BJP |

=== Ministers of State (Independent Charge) ===
| Portfolio | Minister | Took office | Left office | Party |
|---|---|---|---|---|
| Other Backward Classes and Minority Welfare | Krishna Gaur | 25 December 2023 | Incumbent | BJP |
| Culture; Tourism; Religious Trust and Endowments | Dharmendra Singh Lodhi | 25 December 2023 | Incumbent | BJP |
| Cottage and Village Industries | Dilip Jaiswal | 25 December 2023 | Incumbent | BJP |
| Skill Development and Employment | Gautam Tetwal | 25 December 2023 | Incumbent | BJP |
| Dairy and Animal Husbandry | Lakhan Patel | 25 December 2023 | Incumbent | BJP |
| Fisheries and Fishermen Welfare | Narayan Singh Panwar | 25 December 2023 | Incumbent | BJP |

=== Ministers of State ===
| Portfolio | Minister | Took office | Left office | Party |
|---|---|---|---|---|
| Panchayat and Rural Development | Radha Ravindra Singh | 25 December 2023 | Incumbent | BJP |
| Urban Development; Housing | Pratima Bagri | 25 December 2023 | Incumbent | BJP |
| Forest and Environment | Dileep Ahirwar | 25 December 2023 | Incumbent | BJP |
| Public Health | Narendra Shivaji Patel | 25 December 2023 | Incumbent | BJP |

== Demographics of Council of Ministers ==
| Division | District | Ministers | Name of ministers |
|---|---|---|---|
| Chambal | Sheopur | 1 | Ramnivas Rawat |
| Chambal | Morena | 1 | Adal Singh Kansana |
| Chambal | Bhind | 1 | Rakesh Shukla |
| Gwalior | Gwalior | 2 | Pradhuman Singh Tomar; Narayan Singh Kushwah |
| Gwalior | Datia | – | – |
| Gwalior | Shivpuri | – | – |
| Gwalior | Guna | – | – |
| Gwalior | Ashoknagar | – | – |
| Sagar | Sagar | 1 | Govind Singh Rajput |
| Sagar | Tikamgarh | – | – |
| Sagar | Niwari | – | – |
| Sagar | Chhatarpur | 1 | Dileep Ahirwar |
| Sagar | Damoh | 2 | Dharmendra Singh Lodhi; Lakhan Patel |
| Sagar | Panna | – | – |
| Rewa | Satna | 1 | Pratima Bagri |
| Rewa | Maihar | – | – |
| Rewa | Rewa | 1 | Rajendra Shukla (Deputy Chief Minister) |
| Rewa | Mauganj | – | – |
| Rewa | Sidhi | – | – |
| Rewa | Singrauli | 1 | Radha Singh |
| Shahdol | Shahdol | – | – |
| Shahdol | Anuppur | 1 | Dilip Jaiswal |
| Shahdol | Umaria | – | – |
| Jabalpur | Katni | – | – |
| Jabalpur | Jabalpur | 1 | Rakesh Singh |
| Jabalpur | Dindori | – | – |
| Jabalpur | Mandla | 1 | Sampatiya Uikey |
| Jabalpur | Balaghat | – | – |
| Jabalpur | Seoni | – | – |
| Jabalpur | Narsinghpur | 2 | Prahlad Singh Patel; Uday Pratap Singh |
| Jabalpur | Chhindwara | – | – |
| Jabalpur | Pandhurna | – | – |
| Narmadapuram | Betul | – | – |
| Narmadapuram | Harda | – | – |
| Narmadapuram | Narmadapuram | – | – |
| Bhopal | Raisen | 1 | Narendra Shivaji Patel |
| Bhopal | Vidisha | – | – |
| Bhopal | Bhopal | 2 | Vishvas Sarang; Krishna Gaur |
| Bhopal | Sehore | 1 | Karan Singh Verma |
| Bhopal | Rajgarh | 2 | Gautam Tetwal; Narayan Singh Panwar |
| Indore | Khandwa | 1 | Kunwar Vijay Shah |
| Indore | Burhanpur | – | – |
| Indore | Khargone | – | – |
| Indore | Barwani | – | – |
| Indore | Alirajpur | 1 | Nagar Singh Chouhan |
| Indore | Jhabua | 1 | Nirmala Bhuria |
| Indore | Dhar | – | – |
| Indore | Indore | 2 | Kailash Vijayvargiya; Tulsi Silawat |
| Ujjain | Agar Malwa | – | – |
| Ujjain | Shajapur | 1 | Inder Singh Paramar |
| Ujjain | Dewas | – | – |
| Ujjain | Ujjain | 1 | Mohan Yadav (Chief Minister) |
| Ujjain | Ratlam | 1 | Chetanya Kashyap |
| Ujjain | Mandsaur | 1 | Jagdish Devda (Deputy Chief Minister) |
| Ujjain | Neemuch | – | – |
| Total | | 32 | |
