= Chief minister (India) =

Head of government of a state or union territory in India

Chief Minister of States/Union Territories
- Emblem of India

- Flag of India
- Style: Honourable (Inside India); His/Her Excellency (Outside India)
- Type: Head of the state government
- Status: Leader of the executive
- Member of: Member of legislature of respective states and union territories of India
- Reports to: Governor of respective states; Lieutenant governor of respective union territories of India; Legislative assembly
- Residence: Respective state capitals
- Appointer: Governor; by convention, based on appointee's ability to command confidence in the Legislative Assembly
- Term length: Maxiumum of five years, given they have the confidence of the assembly; No restriction on renewal
- Constituting instrument: Article No. 163 and 164, Constitution of India
- Deputy: Deputy chief minister
- Salary: ₹405,000 (US$4,300) (incl. allowances) per month
- Website: Chief Ministers of India

In India, a chief minister is the elected head of government of each state out of the 28 states and sometimes a union territory (UT). Currently, only the UTs of Delhi, Jammu and Kashmir and Puducherry have serving chief ministers. According to the Constitution of India, the governor is a state's head, but de facto executive authority rests with the chief minister.

Following elections to the State legislative assembly or Vidhan Sabha in a state, the state's governor usually invites the party (or coalition) with a majority of seats to form the government. The governor appoints and swears in the chief minister, whose council of ministers are collectively responsible to the assembly. Based on the Westminster system, given that they retain the confidence of the assembly, the chief minister's term can last for the length of the assembly's life, a maximum of five years. There are no limits to the number of terms that the chief minister can serve. A chief minister heads a state government's council of ministers and can be deputised in that role by a deputy chief minister. The chief minister generally selects the chief secretary and can also allot departments to the cabinet ministers of their state and ministers of state. They also direct the chief secretary to transfer, suspend, or promote officers of their state.

The chief minister usually serves as the leader of the house in the respective legislative assembly. (Note: Except in Tamil Nadu, where K. A. Sengottaiyan serves as the leader of the house whereas C. Joseph Vijay is the chief minister.)

Of the 31 incumbents, Seventeen incumbents belong to the Bharatiya Janata Party and four to the Indian National Congress, with no other party having more than one chief minister in office. Neiphiu Rio from Nagaland, has had the longest tenure (19 years, 264 days) as a chief minister. Pema Khandu of Arunachal Pradesh, serving since 16 July 2016 (for 10 years, 123 days), has the longest continuous incumbency. Mizoram's Lalduhoma (aged 77) is the oldest and Pema Khandu (aged 47), from Arunachal Pradesh is the youngest. Delhi's Rekha Gupta is the only incumbent female chief minister. As of 16 November 2026, 20 states and 2 union territories are run by the National Democratic Alliance, 6 states and 1 union territory by INDIA, 2 states have no alliance, and 5 union territories have no legislature.

== Eligibility ==
The Constitution of India sets the principle qualifications one must meet to be eligible to the office of chief minister. A chief minister must be:

- a citizen of India.
- should be a member of the state legislature
- of 25 years of age or more

An individual who is not a member of the legislature can be considered the chief minister provided they get themselves elected to the State Legislature within six months from the date of their appointment. Failing which, they would cease to be the chief minister.

== Election ==
The chief minister is elected through a majority in the state legislative assembly. This is procedurally established by the vote of confidence in the legislative assembly, as suggested by the governor of the state who is the appointing authority. They are elected for five years. The chief minister holds office at the pleasure of the governor.

== Oath ==
Since, according to the constitution, the chief minister is appointed by the governor, the swearing in ceremony is held before the governor of the state.

The oath of office

I, <Name of Minister> do swear in the name of God/solemnly affirm that I will bear true faith and allegiance to the Constitution of India as by law established, that I will uphold the sovereignty and integrity of India, that I will faithfully and conscientiously discharge my duties as a Minister for the State of <Name of the State> and that I will do right to all manner of people in accordance with the Constitution and the law without fear or favour, affection or ill-will.

— Constitution of India, Schedule 3, Para 5

The oath of secrecy

I, <Name of Minister>, do swear in the name of God/solemnly affirm that I will not directly or indirectly communicate or reveal to any person or persons any matter which shall be brought under my consideration or shall become known to me as a Minister for the State of <Name of the State> except as may be required for the due discharge of my duties as such Minister.

— Constitution of India, Schedule 3, Para 6

== Resignation ==
In the event of a chief minister's resignation, which conventionally occurs after a general election or during a phase of assembly majority transition, the outgoing chief minister holds the informal title of "caretaker" chief minister until the governor either appoints a new chief minister or dissolves the assembly. Since the post is not constitutionally defined, the caretaker chief minister enjoys all the powers of a regular chief minister, but cannot make any major policy decisions or cabinet changes during his or her short tenure as caretaker.

== Remuneration ==
By Article 164 of the constitution of India, remuneration of the chief minister as well as other ministers are to be decided by the respective state legislatures. Until the legislature of the state decides salary, it shall be as specified in the second schedule. The salaries thus vary from state to state. As of 2026, the highest salary is drawn by chief ministers of Telangana, which is ₹410,000 (US$4,400) and lowest by the chief ministers of Tripura which is ₹105,500 (US$1,100) legally.

The net salary of the Chief Ministers varies from state to state. The following table shows the basic pay of CM of each state of India in decreasing order from top to bottom.

Net Salary of Chief Minister of all states as of 2019
State	CM Net Salary per month (Note: This salary includes the Basic Pay, Dearness Allowance and House Rent Allowance.) (including other emoluments and allowances)
Telangana	₹400,000 (US$4,300) (Including Salary received as MLC/MLA)
Delhi	₹390,000 (US$4,200) (Including Salary received as MLA)
Uttar Pradesh	₹365,000 (US$3,900) (Including Salary received as MLC/MLA)
Maharashtra	₹340,000 (US$3,600) (Including Salary received as MLC/MLA)
Andhra Pradesh	₹335,000 (US$3,600) (Including Salary received as MLC/MLA)
Gujarat	₹321,000 (US$3,400) (Including Salary received as MLA)
Himachal Pradesh	₹310,000 (US$3,300) (Including Salary received as MLA)
Haryana	₹288,000 (US$3,100) (Including Salary received as MLA)
Jharkhand	₹272,000 (US$2,900) (Including Salary received as MLA)
Madhya Pradesh	₹255,000 (US$2,700) (Including Salary received as MLA)
Chhattisgarh	₹230,000 (US$2,500) (Including Salary received as MLA)
Punjab	₹230,000 (US$2,500) (Including Salary received as MLA)
Goa	₹220,000 (US$2,400) (Including Salary received as MLA)
Bihar	₹215,000 (US$2,300) (Including Salary received as MLC/MLA)
West Bengal	₹210,000 (US$2,200) (Including Salary received as MLA)
Tamil Nadu	₹285,000 (US$3,000) (Including Salary received as MLA)
Karnataka	₹200,000 (US$2,100) (Including Salary received as MLC/MLA)
Sikkim	₹190,000 (US$2,000) (Including Salary received as MLA)
Kerala	₹185,000 (US$2,000) (Including Salary received as MLA)
Rajasthan	₹300,000 (US$3,200) (Including Salary received as MLA)
Uttarakhand	₹175,000 (US$1,900) (Including Salary received as MLA)
Assam	₹160,000 (US$1,700) (Including Salary received as MLA)
Odisha	₹160,000 (US$1,700)(Including Salary received as MLA)
Meghalaya	₹150,000 (US$1,600) (Including Salary received as MLA)
Arunachal Pradesh	₹133,000 (US$1,400) (Including Salary received as MLA)
Manipur	₹120,000 (US$1,300) (Including Salary received as MLA)
Mizoram (Note: passed by Assembly Session on 21 November 2019)	₹120,000 (US$1,300) (Including Salary received as MLA)
Puducherry	₹120,000 (US$1,300) (Including Salary received as MLA)
Nagaland	₹110,000 (US$1,200) (Including Salary received as MLA)
Tripura	₹105,000 (US$1,100) (Including Salary received as MLA)

== Current list ==
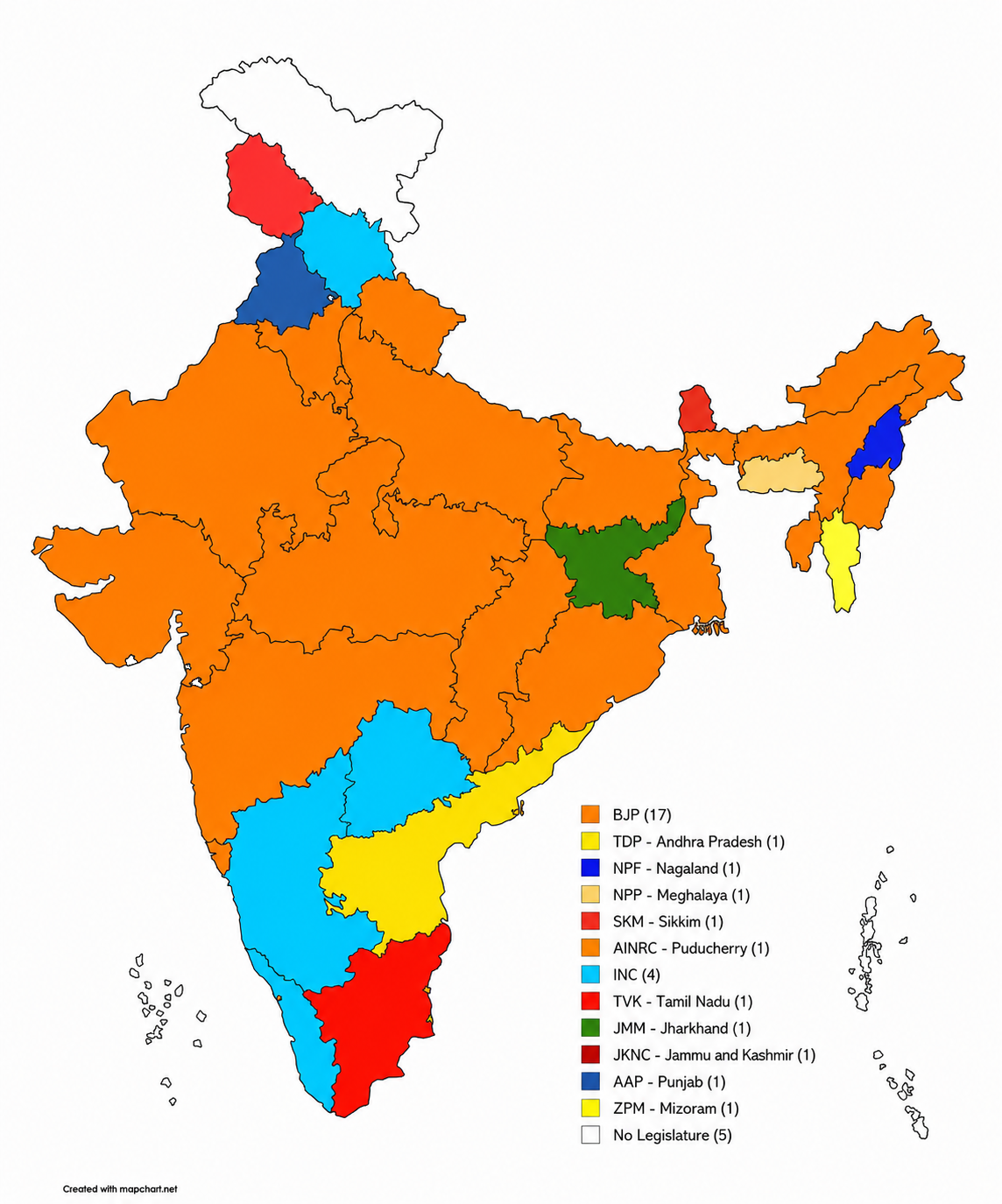
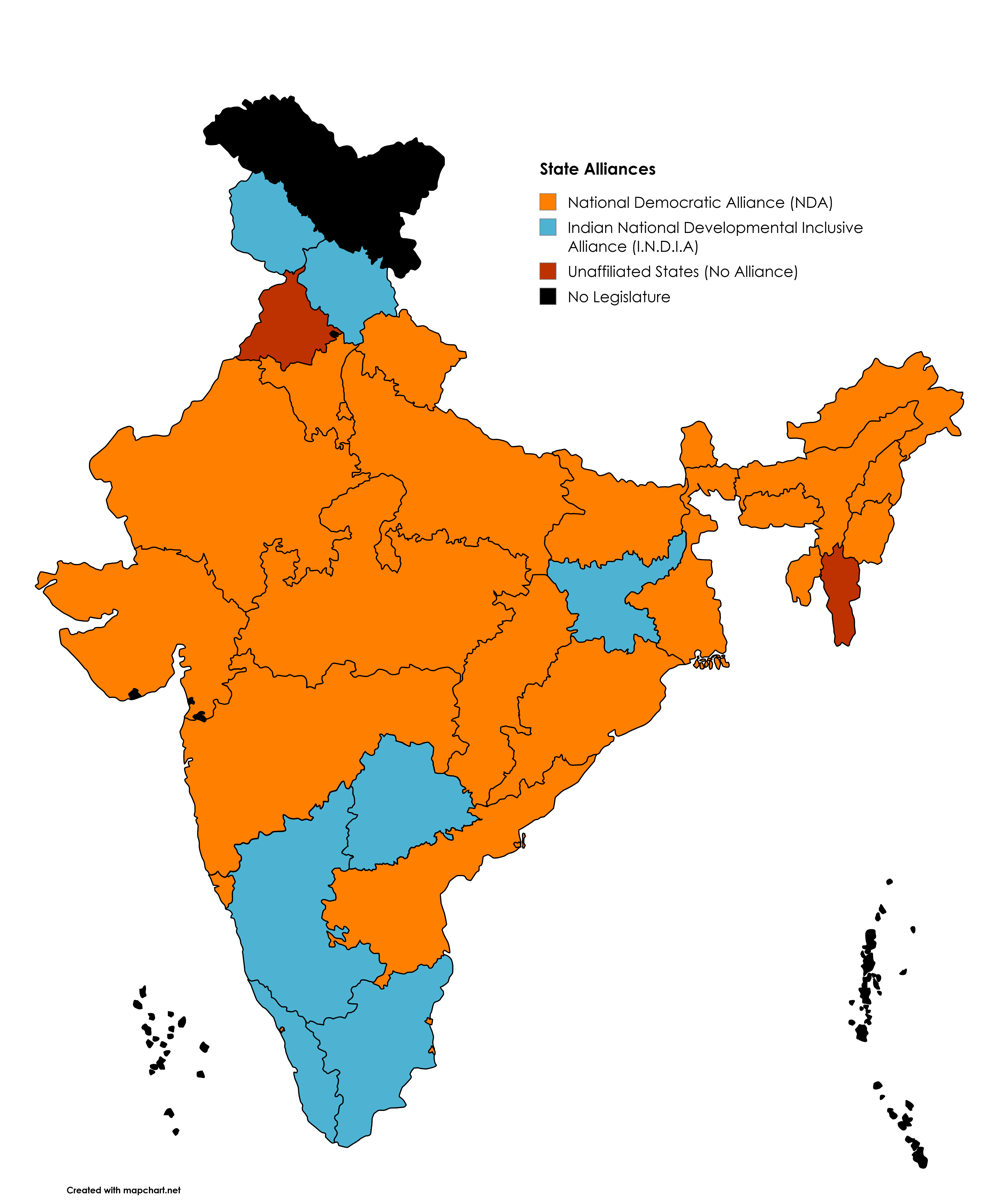
Ruling parties as of May 2026 and alliances in Indian states as of May 2026

NDA: 22

INDIA: 7

None: 2

=== Legend ===
Indicates that the chief minister was by- elected to the constituency he represents

List of chief ministers
State/UT (Note: The chief minister of the states in India rank 7th in the Order of Precedence of India, while the chief minister of the union territories in India rank 15th in the Order of Precedence of India.)	List	Portrait	Officeholder	Took office (tenure length)	Political Party (Note: Only the chief minister's party is indicated. They may head a complex coalition of several parties and independents, which are not listed here.)	National Alliance	State/UT Alliance (Regional Alliance)	Ministry	Constituency (Note: Current constituency)	Election	Appointed by (Note: Denotes the governor at the time of appointment.)	Ref
Andhra Pradesh	List		N. Chandrababu Naidu	12 June 2024 (2 years, 157 days)	TDP	NDA	Kutami	Naidu IV	Kuppam	2024	Syed Abdul Nazeer	
Arunachal Pradesh	List		Pema Khandu	17 July 2016 (10 years, 122 days)	BJP	NDA	NEDA	Khandu V	Mukto	2024	Kaiwalya Trivikram Parnaik	
Assam	List		Himanta Biswa Sarma	10 May 2021 (5 years, 190 days)	BJP	NDA	NEDA	Sarma II	Jalukbari	2026	Lakshman Acharya	
Bihar	List		Samrat Choudhary	15 April 2026 (215 days)	BJP	NDA	NDA	Choudhary	Tarapur	2025	Syed Ata Hasnain	
Chhattisgarh	List		Vishnu Deo Sai	13 December 2023 (2 years, 338 days)	BJP	NDA	NDA	Sai	Kunkuri	2023	Biswabhusan Harichandan	
Delhi (Note: Although Delhi, Jammu and Kashmir and Puducherry each have an elected legislature and a council of ministers (headed by the chief minister), they are officially classified as union territories.)	List		Rekha Gupta	20 February 2025 (1 year, 269 days)	BJP	NDA	NDA	Gupta	Shalimar Bagh	2025	V. K. Saxena	
Goa	List		Pramod Sawant	19 March 2019 (7 years, 242 days)	BJP	NDA	NDA	Sawant II	Sanquelim	2022	P. S. Sreedharan Pilliai	
Gujarat	List		Bhupendrabhai Patel	13 September 2021 (5 years, 64 days)	BJP	NDA	NDA	Patel II	Ghatlodia	2022	Acharya Devvrat	
Haryana	List		Nayab Singh Saini	12 March 2024 (2 years, 249 days)	BJP	NDA	NDA	Saini II	Ladwa	2024	Bandaru Dattatreya	
Himachal Pradesh	List		Sukhvinder Singh Sukhu	11 December 2022 (3 years, 340 days)	INC	INDIA	INDIA	Sukhu	Nadaun	2022	Rajendra Arlekar	
Jammu and Kashmir	List		Omar Abdullah	16 October 2024 (2 years, 31 days)	JKNC	INDIA	JKNC-led INDIA	Abdullah II	Ganderbul	2024	Manoj Sinha	
Jharkhand	List		Hemant Soren	4 July 2024 (2 years, 135 days)	JMM	INDIA	MGB	Soren IV	Barhi	2024	Santosh Kumar Gangwar	
Karnataka	List		D. K. Shivakumar	3 June 2026 (166 days)	INC	INDIA	INDIA	Shivakumar	Kanakapura	2023	Thawar Chand Gehlot	
Kerala	List		V. D. Satheesan	18 May 2026 (182 days)	INC	INDIA	UDF	Satheesan	Paravur	2026	Rajendra Arlekar	
Madhya Pradesh	List		Mohan Yadav	13 December 2023 (2 years, 338 days)	BJP	NDA	NDA	Yadav	Ujjain South	2023	Mangubhai C. Patel	
Maharashtra	List		Devendra Fadnavis	5 December 2024 (1 year, 346 days)	BJP	NDA	MY	Fadnavis III	Nagpur South West	2024	C. P. Radhakrishnan	
Manipur	List		Yumnam Khemchand Singh	4 February 2026 (285 days)	BJP	NDA	NEDA	Singh	Singjamei	2022	Ajay Kumar Bhalla	
Meghalaya	List		Conrad Sangma	6 March 2018 (8 years, 255 days)	NPP	NDA	MDA (NEDA)	Sangma II	South Tura	2023	Phagu Chauhan	
Mizoram	List		Lalduhoma	8 December 2023 (2 years, 343 days)	ZPM	None	None	Lalduhoma	Serchhip	2023	Kambhampati Hari Babu	
Nagaland	List		Neiphiu Rio	8 March 2018 (8 years, 253 days)	NPF	NDA	PDA (NEDA)	Rio V	Northern Angami II	2023	La. Ganesan	
Odisha	List		Mohan Charan Majhi	12 June 2024 (2 years, 157 days)	BJP	NDA	NDA	Majhi	Keonjhar	2024	Raghubar Das	
Puducherry	List		N. Rangaswamy	7 May 2021 (5 years, 193 days)	AINRC	NDA	AINRC+	Rangasamy V	Mangalam	2026	Kuniyil Kailashnathan	
Punjab	List		Bhagwant Mann	16 March 2022 (4 years, 245 days)	AAP	None	None	Mann	Dhuri	2022	Banwarilal Purohit	
Rajasthan	List		Bhajan Lal Sharma	15 December 2023 (2 years, 336 days)	BJP	NDA	NDA	Sharma	Sanganer	2023	Kalraj Mishra	
Sikkim	List		Prem Singh Tamang	27 May 2019 (7 years, 173 days)	SKM	NDA	NEDA	Tamang II	Rhenock	2024	Lakshman Acharya	
Tamil Nadu	List		C. Joseph Vijay	10 May 2026 (190 days)	TVK	None	TVK+	Vijay	Perambur	2026	Rajendra Vishwanath Arlekar	
Telangana	List		Revanth Reddy	7 December 2023 (2 years, 344 days)	INC	INDIA	INDIA	Reddy	Kodangal	2023	Tamilisai Soundrararajan	
Tripura	List		Manik Saha	15 May 2022 (4 years, 185 days)	BJP	NDA	NEDA	Saha II	Town Bordowali	2023	Satyadev Narayan Arya	
Uttar Pradesh	List		Yogi Adityanath	19 March 2017 (9 years, 242 days)	BJP	NDA	NDA	Yogi II	Gorakhpur Urban	2022	Anandiben Patel	
Uttarakhand	List		Pushkar Singh Dhami	4 July 2021 (5 years, 135 days)	BJP	NDA	NDA	Dhami II	Champawat	2022	Gurmit Singh	
West Bengal	List		Suvendu Adhikari	9 May 2026 (191 days)	BJP	NDA	NDA	Adhikari	Bhabanipur	2026	R. N. Ravi	

== Deputy chief minister ==
The deputy chief minister is a member of the state government and usually the second highest ranking executive officer of their state's council of ministers. While not a constitutional office, it seldom carries any specific powers. In the parliamentary system of government, the chief minister is treated as the "first among equals" in the cabinet; the position of deputy chief minister is used to bring political stability and strength within a coalition government. The position of deputy chief minister is not explicitly defined or mentioned in the Constitution of India. However, the Supreme Court of India has stated that the appointment of deputy chief ministers is not unconstitutional. The court has clarified that a deputy chief minister, for all practical purposes, remains a minister in the council of ministers headed by the chief minister and does not draw a higher salary or perks compared to other ministers.

Various states throughout the history have appointed deputy chief ministers. Despite being not mentioned in the constitution or law, the deputy-chief minister office is often used to pacify factions within the party or coalition. It is similar to the rarely used deputy-prime minister post in the central government of India. During the absence of the chief minister, the deputy-chief minister may chair cabinet meetings and lead the assembly majority. Various deputy chief ministers have also taken the oath of secrecy in line with the one that chief minister takes. This oath has also sparked controversies.

Currently, only 17 states and 1 union territory (out of 28 states and 3 union territories) have deputy chief ministers. Out of these, Bihar, Chhattisgarh, Madhya Pradesh, Maharashtra, Manipur, Meghalaya, Nagaland, Odisha, Rajasthan and Uttar Pradesh have two deputy chief ministers each. No other state and union territory has more than one deputy chief minister in office.

The Bharatiya Janata Party has fifteen incumbents, the Indian National Congress has three, the Naga People's Front, Janata Dal (United) and the National People's Party have two incumbents, the Jana Sena Party, Nationalist Congress Party, Shiv Sena and the Jammu and Kashmir National Conference has one incumbent each. Of the 28 incumbents, four are woman — Sunetra Pawar in Maharashtra, Nemcha Kipgen in Manipur,Pravati Parida in Odisha & Diya Kumari in Rajasthan. The longest-serving incumbent deputy chief minister is Chowna Mein, who has served as the deputy chief minister of Arunachal Pradesh since 17 July 2016 (for 10 years, 122 days). As of 16 November 2026, one state (Uttarakhand) and one union territory (Puducherry) have never had a deputy chief minister.

=== Current list ===
State	List	Portrait	Officeholder	Took office (tenure length)	Party	Chief Minister	Chief Minister's Party	State/UT Alliance (Regional Alliance)	National Alliance	Ref
Andhra Pradesh	List		Konidela Pawan Kalyan	12 June 2024; 2 years, 157 days	JSP	N. Chandrababu Naidu	TDP	Kutami	NDA	
Arunachal Pradesh	List		Chowna Mein	16 July 2016; 10 years, 123 days	BJP	Pema Khandu	BJP	NDA (NEDA)	NDA	
Bihar	List		Bijendra Prasad Yadav	15 April 2026; 215 days	JD (U)	Samrat Chaudhary	BJP	NDA	NDA	
Bihar	List		Vijay Kumar Chaudhary	15 April 2026; 215 days	JD (U)	Samrat Chaudhary	BJP	NDA	NDA	
Chhattisgarh	List		Arun Sao	13 December 2023; 2 years, 338 days	BJP	Vishnu Deo Sai	BJP	NDA	NDA	
Chhattisgarh	List		Vijay Sharma	13 December 2023; 2 years, 338 days	BJP	Vishnu Deo Sai	BJP	NDA	NDA	
Gujarat	List		Harsh Rameshbhai Sanghavi	17 October 2025; 1 year, 30 days	BJP	Bhupendrabhai Patel	BJP	NDA	NDA	
Himachal Pradesh	List		Mukesh Agnihotri	11 December 2022; 3 years, 340 days	INC	Sukhvinder Singh Sukhu	INC	INDIA	INDIA	
Jammu and Kashmir	List		Surinder Kumar Choudhary	16 October 2024; 2 years, 31 days	JKNC	Omar Abdullah	JKNC	JKNC-led INDIA	INDIA	
Karnataka	List		G. Parameshwara	3 June 2026; 166 days	INC	D. K. Shivakumar	INC	INDIA	INDIA	
Madhya Pradesh	List		Rajendra Shukla	13 December 2023; 2 years, 338 days	BJP	Mohan Yadav	BJP	NDA	NDA	
Madhya Pradesh	List		Jagdish Devda	13 December 2023; 2 years, 338 days	BJP	Mohan Yadav	BJP	NDA	NDA	
Maharashtra	List		Eknath Sambhaji Shinde	5 December 2024; 1 year, 346 days	SHS	Devendra Fadnavis	BJP	MY	NDA	
Maharashtra	List		Sunetra Ajit Pawar	31 January 2026; 289 days	NCP	Devendra Fadnavis	BJP	MY	NDA	
Manipur	List		Nemcha Kipgen	4 February 2026; 285 days	BJP	Y. Khemchand Singh	BJP	NDA (NEDA)	NDA	
Manipur	List		Losii Dikho	4 February 2026; 285 days	NPF	Y. Khemchand Singh	BJP	NDA (NEDA)	NDA	
Meghalaya	List		Prestone Tynsong	6 March 2018; 8 years, 255 days	NPP	Conrad Sangma	NPP	MDA (NEDA)	NDA	
Meghalaya	List		Sniawbhalang Dhar	7 March 2023; 3 years, 254 days	NPP	Conrad Sangma	NPP	MDA (NEDA)	NDA	
Nagaland	List		Yanthungo Patton	9 March 2018; 8 years, 252 days	BJP	Neiphiu Rio	NPF	PDA (NEDA)	NDA	
Nagaland	List		Taditui Rangkau Zeliang	7 March 2023; 3 years, 254 days	NPF	Neiphiu Rio	NPF	PDA (NEDA)	NDA	
Odisha	List		Kanak Vardhan Singh Deo	12 June 2024; 2 years, 157 days	BJP	Mohan Charan Majhi	BJP	NDA	NDA	
Odisha	List		Pravati Parida	12 June 2024; 2 years, 157 days	BJP	Mohan Charan Majhi	BJP	NDA	NDA	
Rajasthan	List		Diya Kumari	15 December 2023; 2 years, 336 days	BJP	Bhajan Lal Sharma	BJP	NDA	NDA	
Rajasthan	List		Prem Chand Bairwa	15 December 2023; 2 years, 336 days	BJP	Bhajan Lal Sharma	BJP	NDA	NDA	
Telangana	List		Mallu Bhatti Vikramarka	7 December 2023; 2 years, 344 days	INC	Revanth Reddy	INC	INDIA		
Uttar Pradesh	List	Shri Keshav Prasad Maurya (cropped)	Keshav Prasad Maurya	19 March 2017; 9 years, 242 days	BJP	Yogi Adityanath	BJP	NDA		
Uttar Pradesh	List	Brajesh Pathak	Brajesh Pathak	25 March 2022; 4 years, 236 days	BJP	Yogi Adityanath	BJP	NDA		

== See also ==
1. Governor (India)
2. List of current Indian opposition leaders
3. Chief Whip (India)
4. List of current Indian legislative speakers and chairpersons
