= Fourth Chouhan ministry =

Indian council of ministers (2020-23)

- Ministry of Madhya Pradesh
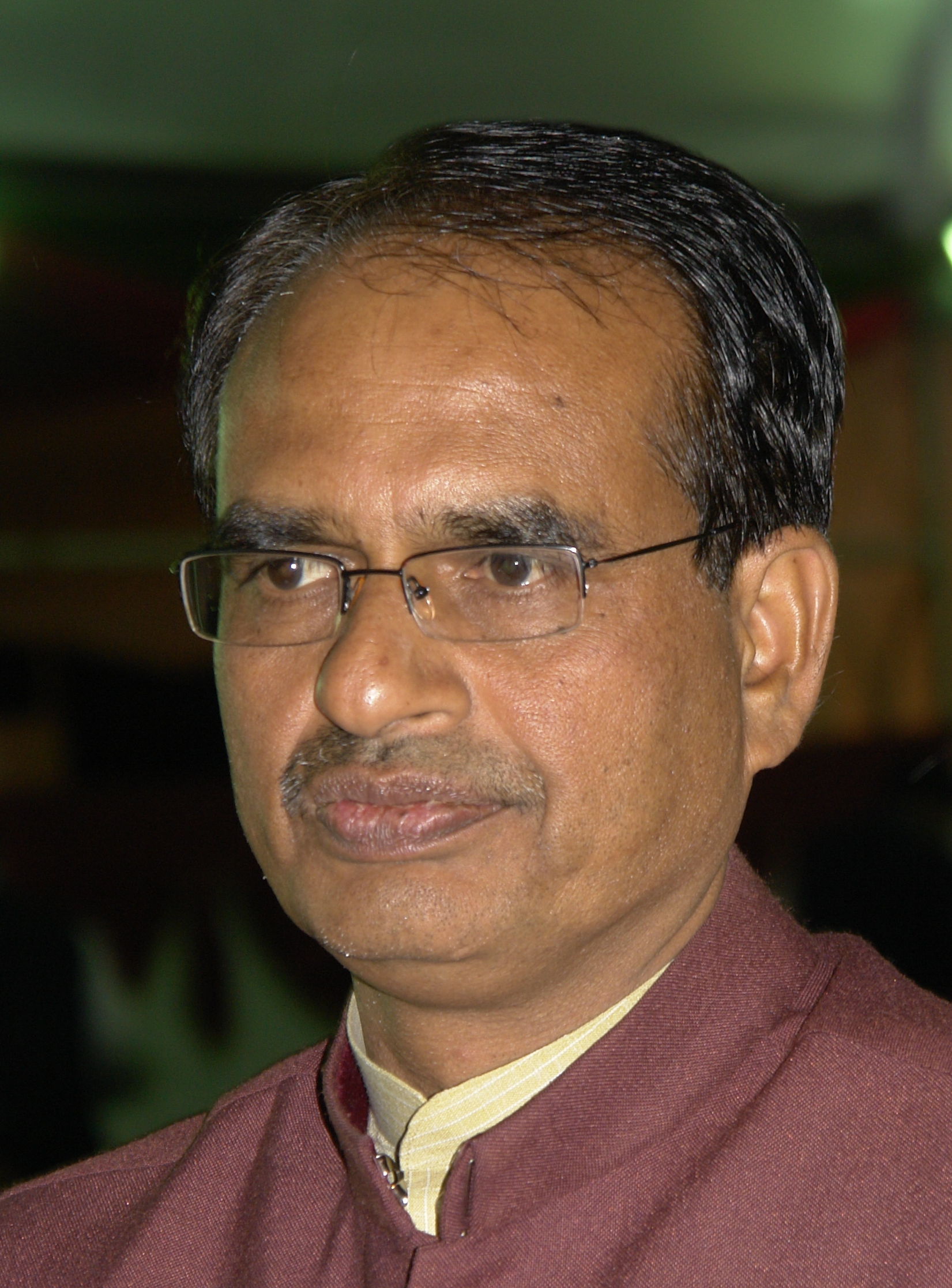
- Shivraj Singh Chouhan; Hon'ble Chief Minister of Madhya Pradesh
- Date formed: 23 March 2020
- Date dissolved: 13 December 2023

People and organisations
- Governor: Lalji Tandon (until 2020); Anandiben Patel, Acting (2020–2021); Mangubhai C. Patel (from 2021)
- Chief Minister: Shivraj Singh Chouhan
- No. of ministers: 31
- Ministers removed: 5
- Member parties: Bharatiya Janata Party
- Status in legislature: Majority
- Opposition party: INC
- Opposition leader: Govind Singh

History
- Incoming formation: 2020
- Election: 2018
- Outgoing election: 2018
- Legislature term: 5 years
- Predecessor: Kamal Nath ministry
- Successor: Mohan Yadav ministry

The Shivraj Singh Chauhan Fourth ministry was the Council of Ministers in the 15th Madhya Pradesh Legislative Assembly headed by Chief Minister Shivraj Singh Chouhan from March 2020 to December 2023.

== Council of Ministers ==
Portfolio	Minister	Took office	Left office	Party
Chief Minister; General Administration; Public Relations; Narmada Valley Development; Aviation Department; Other departments not allocated to any Minister	Shivraj Singh Chauhan	23 March 2020	Incumbent	BJP
Minister of Public Works Department; Minister of Cottage & Rural Industries	Gopal Bhargava	2 July 2020	Incumbent	BJP
Minister of Home Affairs	Narottam Mishra	21 April 2020	Incumbent	BJP
Minister of Law; Minister of Parliamentary Affairs	Narottam Mishra	13 July 2020	Incumbent	BJP
Minister of Agriculture	Kamal Patel	21 April 2020	Incumbent	BJP
Minister of Scheduled Castes/Scheduled Tribes Welfare	Meena Singh	21 April 2020	Incumbent	BJP
Minister of Sports & Youth Welfare; Minister of Technical Education; Minister of Skill Development & Employment	Yashodhara Raje Scindia	2 July 2020	Incumbent	BJP
Minister of Forest	Kunwar Vijay Shah	2 July 2020	Incumbent	BJP
Minister of Finance; Minister of Commercial Taxes; Minister of Planning, Economic & Statistics	Jagdish Devda	2 July 2020	Incumbent	BJP
Minister of Urban Development; Minister of Housing	Bhupendra Singh	2 July 2020	Incumbent	BJP
Minister of Labour; Minister of Mineral Resources	Brijendra Pratap Singh	2 July 2020	Incumbent	BJP
Minister of Medical Education; Minister of Bhopal Gas Tragedy Relief & Rehabilitation	Vishvas Sarang	2 July 2020	Incumbent	BJP
Minister of Micro, Small & Medium Enterprises; Minister of Science & Technology	Om Prakash Sakhlecha	2 July 2020	Incumbent	BJP
Minister of Tourism; Minister of Culture; Minister of Adhyatm	Usha Thakur	2 July 2020	Incumbent	BJP
Minister of Co-operatives & Public Services Management	Arvind Singh Bhadoria	2 July 2020	Incumbent	BJP
Minister of Higher Education	Mohan Yadav	2 July 2020	Incumbent	BJP
Minister of Animal Husbandry; Minister of Social Justice & Disabled Welfare	Prem Singh Patel	2 July 2020	Incumbent	BJP
Minister of Health & Family Welfare	Narottam Mishra	21 April 2020	13 July 2020	BJP
Minister of Health & Family Welfare	Prabhuram Choudhary	13 July 2020	Incumbent	BJP
Minister of Water Resources; Minister of Fisheries	Tulsi Silawat	21 April 2020	21 October 2020	BJP
Minister of Water Resources; Minister of Fisheries	Tulsi Silawat	3 January 2021	Incumbent	BJP
Minister of Revenue; Minister of Transport	Govind Singh Rajput	21 April 2020	21 October 2020	BJP
Minister of Revenue; Minister of Transport	Govind Singh Rajput	3 January 2021	Incumbent	BJP

== Ministers of state ==
Portfolio	Minister	Took office	Left office	Party
Minister of Horticulture (Independent Charge); Minister of Food Processing Industries (Independent Charge)	Bharat Singh Kushwaha	2 July 2020	Incumbent	BJP
Minister of School Education (Independent Charge)	Inder Singh Parmar	2 July 2020	Incumbent	BJP
Minister of Backward Classes & Minorities Welfare (Independent Charge); Minister of Nomadic and Semi-Nomadic Tribes (Independent Charge); Minister of Rural development & Pancahayat Raj	Ramkhelavan Patel	2 July 2020	Incumbent	BJP
Minister of AYUSH (Independent Charge); Minister of Water Resources	Ramkishore Kanware	2 July 2020	Incumbent	BJP
Minister of Public Health Engineering	Brajendra Singh Yadav	2 July 2020	Incumbent	BJP
Minister of Public Works Department	Suresh Dhakad	2 July 2020	Incumbent	BJP
Minister of Urban Development & Housing	O. P. S. Bhadoria	2 July 2020	Incumbent	BJP
Minister of Agriculture	Girraj Dandotiya	2 July 2020	November 2020	BJP
