= Dileep Ahirwar =

Indian politician

Dilip Ahirwar

Minister of State for Forest & Environment, Government of Madhya Pradesh
- Incumbent
- Assumed office 25 December 2023
- Chief Minister: Mohan Yadav
- Preceded by: Kunwar Vijay Shah

Member of the Madhya Pradesh Legislative Assembly
- Incumbent
- Assumed office 2023
- Preceded by: Rajesh Kumar Prajapati
- Constituency: Chandla

Personal details
- Born: 1976 (age 49–50)
- Citizenship: India
- Party: Bhartiya janta party
- Profession: Politician, Farmer

Dileep Ahirwar is an Indian politician, currently a tourism minister of the Government of Madhya Pradesh. He was elected as a Member of the Madhya Pradesh Legislative Assembly in 2023, from Chandla Assembly constituency.

He has been serving as the Minister of Forest and Environment in the Mohan Yadav ministry since 25 December 2023.
