= Rajendra Shukla (politician) =

Indian politician

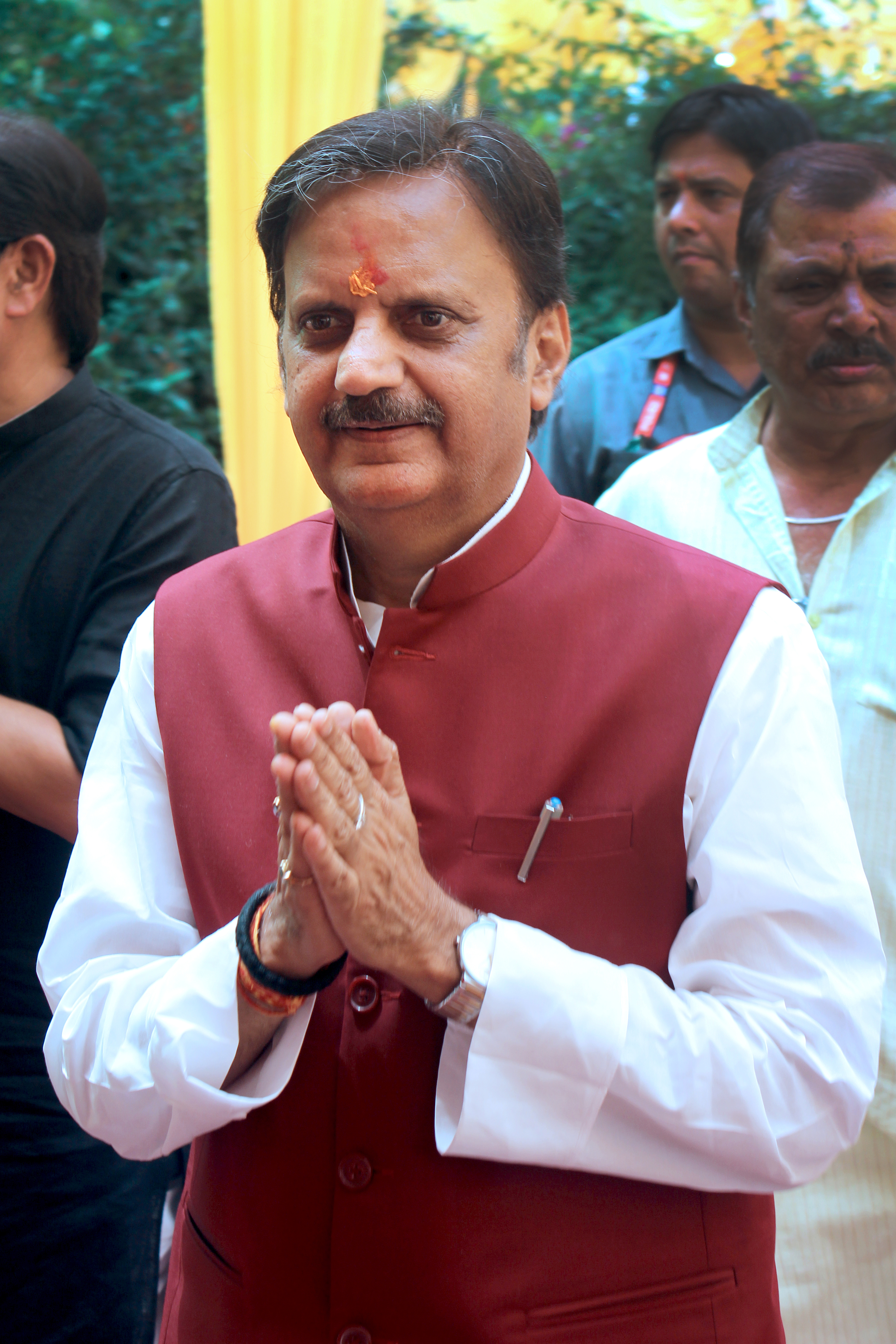

5th Deputy Chief Minister of Madhya Pradesh
- Incumbent
- Assumed office 13 December 2023 Serving with Jagdish Devda
- Governor: Mangubhai C. Patel
- Chief Minister: Mohan Yadav
- Preceded by: Jamuna Devi (1998-2003)

Cabinet Minister Government of Madhya Pradesh
- Incumbent
- Assumed office 25 December 2023
- Chief Minister: Mohan Yadav
- Ministry & Departments: Public Health; Medical Education
- Preceded by: Vishvas Sarang
- In office 26 August 2023 – 11 December 2023
- Chief Minister: Shivraj Singh Chouhan
- Ministry & Departments: Public Health Engineering
- Succeeded by: Sampatiya Uikey
- In office 3 July 2016 – 12 December 2018
- Chief Minister: Shivraj Singh Chouhan
- Ministry & Departments: Industry
- Preceded by: Yashodhara Raje Scindia
- Succeeded by: Kamal Nath
- In office 20 December 2008 – 3 July 2016
- Chief Minister: Shivraj Singh Chouhan
- Ministry & Departments: Energy
- Preceded by: Gauri Shankar Shejwar
- Succeeded by: Paras Chandra Jain

Member of the Madhya Pradesh Legislative Assembly
- Incumbent
- Assumed office 2003
- Preceded by: Pushpraj Singh
- Constituency: Rewa

Personal details
- Born: 3 August 1964 (age 62) Rewa, Madhya Pradesh, India
- Party: Bharatiya Janata Party (since 1998); Indian National Congress (until 1998)
- Spouse: Sunita Shukla
- Children: 1 son, 2 daughters
- Parent: Bhaiyyalal Shukla (father)
- Education: B.E. (Civil engineering)
- Alma mater: Rewa Engineering College
- Profession: Politician

Rajendra Shukla (born 3 August 1964) is an Indian politician of the Bharatiya Janata Party who is 5th & currently Deputy Chief Minister of Madhya Pradesh along with Jagadish Devda under Mohan Yadav since 2022. He is Member of the Legislative Assembly from Rewa constituency of Madhya Pradesh. He is son of Late Shri Bhaiyalal Shukla, a renowned civil contractor of Baghelkhand Region. He is a Cabinet Minister in Government of Madhya Pradesh.

== Personal ==
Rajendra Shukla one of the eminent politicians Of Madhya Pradesh was born on 3 August 1964 in Rewa. His father Bhaiyalal Shukla was a contractor and social worker. He studied at Government school and holds bachelor degree in Civil Engineering from Government Engineering College Rewa. With leadership qualities blooming in his young age only, he became the president of Government Engineering College Student Union in 1986.

== Political career ==
He was president of Government Engineering College Student Union in 1986. He made his way into politics through Congress and was the Treasurer of MP Youth Congress. Later he moved to Bhartiya Janta Party and joined electoral politics contesting 1998 assembly election, which he lost to INC candidate Pushparaj Singh by a close margin of 1394 votes. He got elected to assembly for the first time in 2003, defeating incumbent Pushparaj Singh.

He repeated his victory again in 2008 and 2013 Madhya Pradesh assembly election. In his tenure as an MLA, he served under different ministries including forestry, biodiversity/biotechnology, mineral resources and law and legislative affairs. He also took charge as a cabinet minister in 2023 under Shivaraj Singh Chauhan Government.

In 2018 in spite of anti-incumbency against him, he won against INC candidate Abhay Mishra by a margin of 18,089 votes. He took oath as a cabinet minister just before assembly election 2023 under Shivraj Singh Chouhan Government on August 26, 2023.

== Election ==
In the Madhya Pradesh Legislative Assembly Election 2008 he defeated the Bahujan Samaj Party & Indian National Congress candidates Dr Mujib Khan and Rajendra Sharma, respectively.

Previously in the Madhya Pradesh Legislative Assembly Election 2003 he defeated sitting Indian National Congress MLA and Minister Pushpraj Singh, after losing the previous election to him in 1998.

== Notable works ==
- White Tiger Safari & Zoo Mukundpur
- Rewa Ultra Mega Solar
- Rewa Airport
