= Jamuna Devi =

Indian politician

Jamuna

Deputy Chief Minister of Madhya Pradesh
- In office 1 Dec 1998 – 7 Dec 2003
- Chief Minister: Digvijaya Singh
- Succeeded by: Jagdish Devda; Rajendra Shukla

List of leaders of the opposition in the Madhya Pradesh Legislative Assembly
- In office 16 Dec 2003 – 24 Sep 2010
- Preceded by: Babulal Gaur
- Succeeded by: Satyadev Katare

Member of the Madhya Pradesh Legislative Assembly
- In office 1993–2010
- Preceded by: Ranjana Baghel
- Succeeded by: Mukam Singh Kirade
- Constituency: Kukshi
- In office 1985–1990
- Preceded by: Pratap Singh Baghel
- Succeeded by: Ranjana Baghel

MP of Rajya Sabha for Madhya Pradesh
- In office 1978–1981

Member of Parliament, Lok Sabha
- In office 1962–1967
- Preceded by: Amar Singh Damar
- Succeeded by: Sur Singh
- Constituency: Jhabua-Ratlam, Madhya Pradesh

Personal details
- Born: 19 November 1929 Sardarpur, Central Provinces and Berar, British India
- Died: 24 September 2010 (aged 80) Indore, Madhya Pradesh, India
- Party: Indian National Congress
- Children: 1 Daughter
- Parent: Sukhji (father)
- Occupation: Politician
- As of 17 June, 2018 Source: ["Biography" (PDF). Vidhan Sabha, Madhya Pradesh Legislative Assembly.]

Jamuna Devi (19 November 1929 – 24 September 2010) was a leader of Indian National Congress party from Madhya Pradesh. She was a member of Madhya Pradesh Legislative Assembly and served as the leader of Opposition and deputy chief minister of the state. She was elected as Lok Sabha member from Jhabua (1962–67). She was also the member of Rajya Sabha from 1978 to 1981.

== Career ==
She was member of the first assembly of the Madhya Bharat State from 1952 to 1957 then was Member of Parliament form Jhabua from 1962 to 1967 as well as Rajya Sabha Member from 1978 to 1981.

She was junior minister in Governments Arjun Singh, Motilal Vora and Shyama Charan Shukla but was inducted into cabinet under Digvijaya Singh and was later promoted to Deputy Chief Minister of Madhya Pradesh in 1998, thus becoming first woman deputy chief minister.

When Indian National Congress lost power in 2003, she was named as leader of Opposition and remained in the post until 2010.

== Death ==
Devi died on September 24, 2010, in Indore after suffering a long battle against cancer.
