= Yashodhara Raje Scindia =

Indian politician (born 1954)

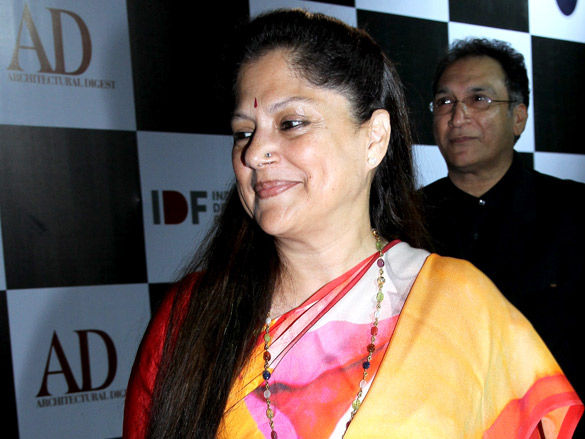
- Scindia in 2013

Minister of Skill Development and Employment, Government of Madhya Pradesh
- In office 2 July 2020 – 13 December 2023
- Chief Minister: Shivraj Singh Chouhan

Minister of Sports & Youth Welfare and Technical Education, Government of Madhya Pradesh
- In office 2 July 2020 – 13 December 2023
- Chief Minister: Shivraj Singh Chouhan

Minister for Commerce, Industries and Employment, Government of Madhya Pradesh
- In office 2013–2018
- Chief Minister: Shivraj Singh Chouhan

Minister of Sports and Youth Welfare, Religious Trusts and Endowment, Government of Madhya Pradesh
- In office 2005–2007
- Chief Minister: Shivraj Singh Chouhan
- Succeeded by: Jitu Patwari

Member of Madhya Pradesh Legislative Assembly
- In office 2013–2023
- Preceded by: Makhan Lal Rathore
- Succeeded by: Devendra Kumar Jain
- Constituency: Shivpuri
- In office 1998–2007
- Constituency: Shivpuri

Member of Parliament, Lok Sabha
- In office 2007–2014
- Preceded by: Ramsevak Singh
- Succeeded by: Narendra Singh Tomar
- Constituency: Gwalior, Madhya Pradesh

Personal details
- Born: 19 June 1954 (age 72) London, United Kingdom
- Party: Bharatiya Janata Party
- Spouse: Siddharth Bhansali (m. 1977; div. 1994)
- Children: 3
- Relatives: Jivajirao Scindia (father); Vijayaraje Scindia (mother); Usharaje Rana (sister); Madhavrao Scindia (brother); Vasundhara Raje (sister); Padmavati Raje Burman (sister); Dushyant Singh(nephew; Jyotiraditya Scindia (nephew); Abhishek Scindia (son)
- Education: The Cathedral & John Connon School; Scindia Kanya Vidyalaya
- Occupation: Politician

Yashodhara Raje Scindia (born 19 June 1954) is an Indian politician who served as Minister of Sports and Youth Welfare, Technical Education, Skill Development and Employment of Madhya Pradesh under Shivraj Singh Chouhan. She is also the former Minister for Commerce, Industries and Employment in Government of Madhya Pradesh. She is the youngest daughter of Jiwajirao Scindia, Maratha Maharaja of Gwalior and the Late Rajmata Vijayaraje Scindia of Gwalior. She was first elected from Gwalior (Lok Sabha constituency) to the 14th Lok Sabha via a by-poll in 2007 and again in 2009 General Election. She is a Member of Legislative Assembly from Shivpuri constituency in Madhya Pradesh since 2013.

She was educated at The Cathedral and John Connon School in Mumbai, then the Presentation Convent, Kodaikanal, and her final 2 years at the Scindia Kanya Vidyalaya, Gwalior, a school founded by her mother.

== Personal life and family ==
Her siblings are Vasundhra Raje Scindia former Chief Minister of Rajasthan, late Madhavrao Scindia, Padmavati Raje 'Akkasaheb' Burman and Usharaje Rana. Usha Raje Rana married Pashupati Shumsher Jung Bahadur Rana, grandson of His Highness Shree 3 Maharaja Sir Mohan Shumsher Jung Bahadur Rana of Nepal. Pashupati Shumsher Jung Bahadur Rana is a politician in Nepal.

Her brother was Madhavrao Scindia who was born in 1945. He was an eminent politician belonging to the Indian National Congress party as opposed to his mother and sisters who belong to the Bharatiya Janata Party. He was married to Madhavi Raje Scindia of Nepal and had two children Chitrangada Raje Scindia who married into the erstwhile royal family of Kashmir and Jyotiraditya Madhavrao Scindia the Member of Parliament from the Bharatiya Janata Party of the Guna, Madhya Pradesh. Madhavrao died in a plane crash in 2001. Her other sister is Vasundhara Raje Scindia of Dholpur who is a member of the Bharatiya Janata Party. Vasundhara has one son Dushyant Singh the Yuvraj of Dholpur who is currently the Member of Parliament from the Jhalawar in Rajasthan.

Yashodhara moved to New Orleans, USA in 1977 after marrying Sidharth Bhansali a cardiologist. She has 3 children, Akshay a producer at MTV Desi in New York (26 yrs), Abhishek a student at the NYU Stern School of Business (born in 1985) and Trishala a student at NYU (born in 1988). Whilst there, she was amongst other things, board member of the Delta Festival Ballet, an Advisory Board Member of the Contemporary Art Center, a Fellow of the New Orleans Museum of Art, as well as single-handedly raised a quarter of a million dollars for the Audubon zoological society. The funds were dedicated to a permanent Indian exhibit space at the Audubon zoo (Voted the # 3 zoo in the whole of USA). After raising the funds she conceptualized and supervised the making of the entire exhibit which was made by local craftsmen in India and then transported in small pieces by sea and re-assembled at the site.

She finalized her divorce in 1994, and entered politics after returning to India.

== Political life and career ==
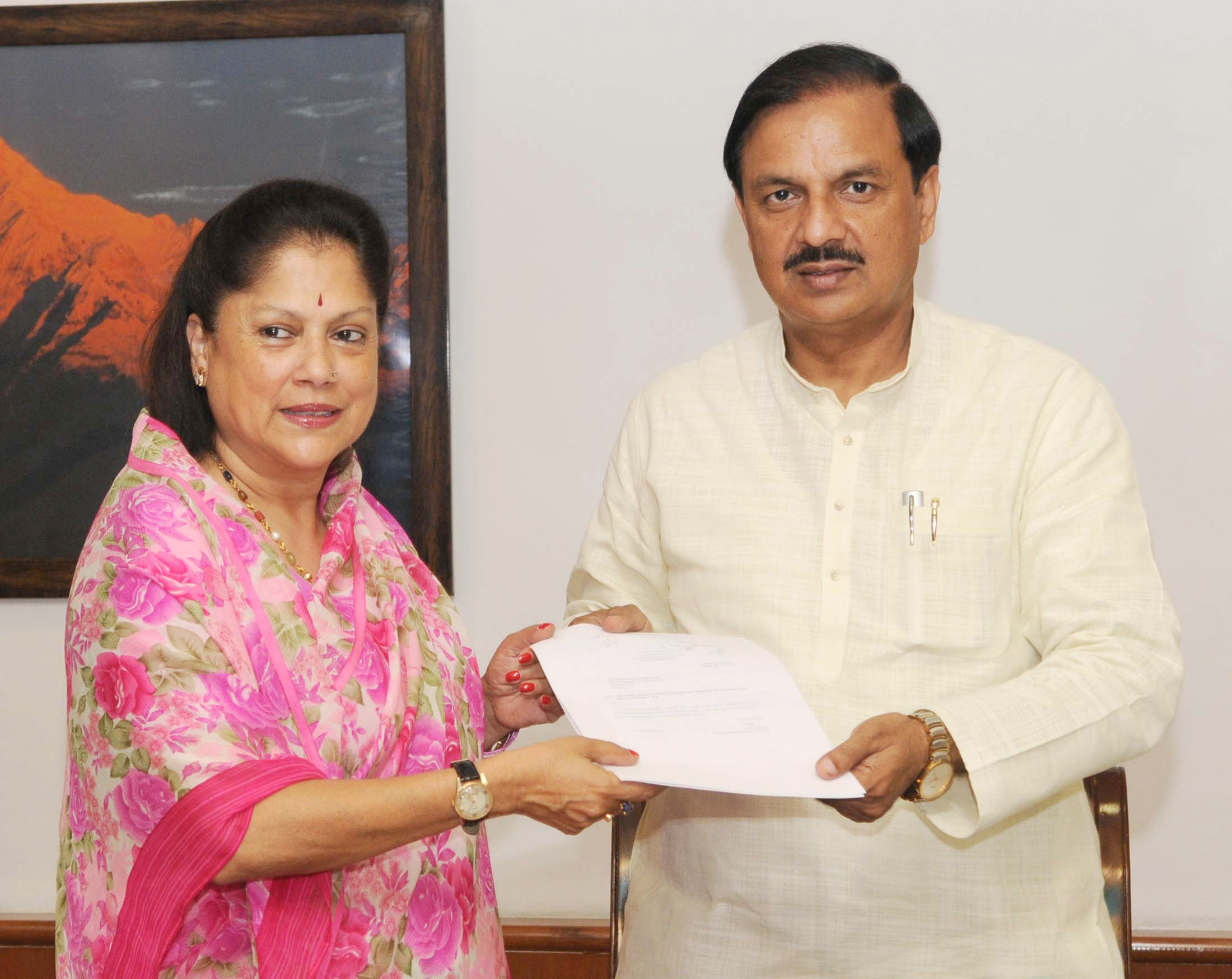
The Minister for Commerce, Industries and Employment of Madhya Pradesh, Smt. Yashodhara Raje Scindia calling on the Minister of State for Culture and Tourism (Independent Charge), Dr. Mahesh Sharma, in New Delhi.

She returned to India in 1994 and went into formal politics, contesting the Madhya Pradesh State Assembly Elections in 1998 as a member of the Bharatiya Janata Party and then being re-elected 5 years later once again, for a second term in 2003 in the State Assembly elections. She is an active member of her State Legislative Party. She served in Madhya Pradesh Government as a Cabinet Minister for Tourism, Sports & Youth Welfare. In October/November 2006 Yashodhara created a controversy of sorts when she got the BJP to issue a notice saying that she would be officially addressed as "Shrimant" which means your highness or your majesty.

In by-elections to be held in early March 2007, she has been nominated as the party's candidate from Gwalior, Madhya Pradesh. On Sunday 11 March 2007 Yashodhara Raje Scindia of the BJP was declared elected to the Gwalior Lok Sabha seat. She defeated her nearest Congress rival Ashok Singh by over 35,000 votes.

On 8 December 2013 she won Legislative Assembly elections in Shivpuri with 76,330 votes.

Again, she won from Shivpuri Assembly constituency in 2018 with 24,282.

== Ancestry ==
Ancestors of Yashodhara Raje Scindia

16. Sardar Hanuwantrao Scindia
8. Jayajirao, Maharaja of Gwalior (1843–1886)
17. Jadav
4. Madhavrao II, Maharaja of Gwalior (1876–1925)
18. Sardar Sir Krishnarao Jadhav, Feroz Jang Bahadur
9. Sakhyabai Raje, Maharani Regent of Gwalior (1862–1919)
2. Jivajirao, Maharaja of Gwalior (1916–1961)
10. Rao Rana Satrojirao Vithalrao Rane, Sar Desai of Sankli
5. Gajrabai Raje, Mahor (d. 1943)
1. Yashodhara Raje Scindia
12. Thakur Theobaran Singh of Gangini,
6. Thakur Mahendra Singh of Sagar (1892–?)
3. Lekha Divyeshwari Devi (Vijaya Raje Scindia), Maharani of Gwalior (1919–2001)
28. Raja Dhir Shamsher Jang Rana Bahadur (1828–1884)
14. Raja Khadga Shamsher Jang Bahadur (1861–1921)
7. Thakurani Chuda Devashwari Devi (c. 1900-1919)
15. Sri Rani Dhankumari Rajya Lakshmi

== See also ==
- Shivraj Singh Chouhan Third ministry (2013–)
