= Chandla Assembly constituency =

Assembly constituency in Madhya Pradesh

Coordinates: 25.07°N 80.19°E

Chandla
- Constituency No. 49 for the Madhya Pradesh Legislative Assembly

Constituency details
- Country: India
- Region: Central India
- State: Madhya Pradesh
- District: Chhatarpur
- Lok Sabha constituency: Khajuraho
- Established: 1951
- Reservation: SC

Member of Legislative Assembly
- 16th Madhya Pradesh Legislative Assembly
- Incumbent Dileep Ahirwar
- Party: Bharatiya Janata Party
- Elected year: 2023
- Preceded by: Rajesh Kumar Prajapati

Chandla Assembly constituency is one of the 230 Vidhan Sabha (Legislative Assembly) constituencies of Madhya Pradesh state in central India. This constituency came into existence in 1951 as one of the 48 Vidhan Sabha constituencies of the erstwhile Vindhya Pradesh state, but it was abolished in 1956. It came into existence again in 1976. This constituency is reserved for the candidates belonging to the Scheduled castes since 2008, following delimitation of the legislative assembly constituencies.

== Overview ==
Chandla (constituency number 49) is one of the 6 Vidhan Sabha constituencies located in Chhatarpur district. This constituency covers the entire Gaurihar tehsil, Chandla nagar panchayat and part of Laundi tehsil of the district.

Chandla is part of Khajuraho Lok Sabha constituency along with seven other Vidhan Sabha segments, namely, Rajnagar in this district, Pawai, Gunnaor and Panna in Panna district and Vijayraghavgarh, Murwara and Bahoriband in Katni district.

== Members of the Legislative Assembly ==
=== Vindhya Pradesh Legislative Assembly ===
| Year | Member | Party |
|---|---|---|
| 1952 | Kamta Prasad | Indian National Congress |

=== Madhya Pradesh Legislative Assembly ===
| Election | Name | Party |
|---|---|---|
| 1977 | Raghunath Singh Kalyan Singh | Janata Party |
| 1980 | Satyavrat Chaturvedi | Indian National Congress (Indira) |
| 1985 | Shyam Bihari Pathak | Indian National Congress |
| 1990 | Ansari Muhammad Gani | Bharatiya Janata Party |
| 1993 | Satyavrat Chaturvedi | Indian National Congress |
| 1998 | Vijay Bahadur Singh Bundela | Samajwadi Party |
| 2003 | Vijay Bahadur Singh Bundela | Samajwadi Party |
| 2008 | Ramdayal Ahirwar | Bharatiya Janata Party |
| 2013 | R. D. Prajapati | Bharatiya Janata Party |
| 2018 | Rajesh Kumar Prajapati | Bharatiya Janata Party |
| 2023 | Dileep Ahirwar | Bharatiya Janata Party |

== Election results ==
=== 2023 ===
2023 Madhya Pradesh Legislative Assembly election: Chandla
| Party | Candidate | Votes | % | ±% |
|---|---|---|---|---|
| BJP | Dileep Ahirwar | 69,668 | 43.14 | +11.98 |
| INC | Anuragi Harprasad | 54,177 | 33.55 | +3.28 |
| SP | Pushpendra Kumar Ahirwar | 24,977 | 15.47 | +3.38 |
| BSP | Deendayal Ahirwar | 7,124 | 4.41 | −15.04 |
| NOTA | None of the above | 2,135 | 1.32 | −0.72 |
| Majority | | 15,491 | 9.59 | +8.7 |
| Turnout | | 161,494 | 68.19 | +5.81 |
| BJP hold | | Swing | | |

=== 2018 ===
2018 Madhya Pradesh Legislative Assembly election: Chandla
| Party | Candidate | Votes | % | ±% |
|---|---|---|---|---|
| BJP | Rajesh Kumar Prajapati | 41,227 | 31.16 | |
| INC | Anuragi Harprasad | 40,050 | 30.27 | |
| BSP | Pushpendra Kumar Ahirwar | 25,739 | 19.45 | |
| SP | Anitya Singh | 15,994 | 12.09 | |
| Independent | Bhavaneedeen | 1,447 | 1.09 | |
| Independent | Ahirwar Rajkumar | 1,293 | 0.98 | |
| NOTA | None of the above | 2,695 | 2.04 | |
| Majority | | 1,177 | 0.89 | |
| Turnout | | 132,307 | 62.38 | |
| BJP hold | | Swing | | |

== See also ==
- Chandla
