= List of deputy chief ministers of Madhya Pradesh =

Madhya Pradesh's third most important political office

Deputy Chief Minister of Madhya Pradesh
- Seal of Madhya Pradesh

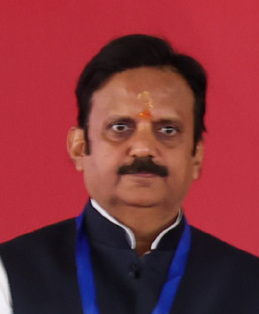
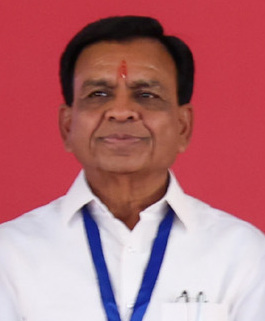
- Incumbent; Rajendra Shukla and Jagdish Devda since 13 December 2023
- Deputy Chief Minister's Office (Madhya Pradesh)
- Style: The Honourable
- Status: Deputy Head of Government
- Abbreviation: DCM
- Member of: Madhya Pradesh Legislative Assembly; Cabinet
- Nominator: Chief Minister of Madhya Pradesh
- Appointer: Governor of Madhya Pradesh
- Term length: At the confidence of the assembly 5 years and is subject to no term limits.
- Inaugural holder: Virendra Kumar Sakhlecha
- Formation: 30 July 1967 (59 years ago)

The deputy chief minister of Madhya Pradesh is a member of the Cabinet of Madhya Pradesh Government. Not a constitutional office, it seldom carries any specific powers. In the parliamentary system of government, the chief minister is treated as the "first among equals" in the cabinet; the position of deputy chief minister is used to bring political stability and strength within a coalition government. The position of deputy chief minister is not explicitly defined or mentioned in the Constitution of India. However, the Supreme Court of India has stated that the appointment of deputy chief ministers is not unconstitutional. The court has clarified that a deputy chief minister, for all practical purposes, remains a minister in the council of ministers headed by the chief minister and does not draw a higher salary or perks compared to other ministers.During the absence of the chief minister, the deputy-chief minister may chair cabinet meetings and lead the assembly majority. Various deputy chief ministers have also taken the oath of secrecy in line with the one that chief minister takes. This oath has also sparked controversies.

== List of deputy chief ministers ==
#	Name	Portrait	Constituency	Term of office			Chief Minister	Party
1	Virendra Kumar Sakhlecha		Jawad	30 July 1967	12 March 1969	1 year, 225 days	Govind Narayan Singh	Bharatiya Jana Sangh
2	Shiv Bhanu Singh Solanki		Dhar				Arjun Singh	Indian National Congress
3	Subhash Yadav		Kasrawad	14 Dec 1993	30 Nov 1998	4 years, days	Digvijaya Singh	Indian National Congress
4	Jamuna Devi		Kukshi	1 Dec 1998	8 Dec 2003	5 years, 7 days	Digvijaya Singh	Indian National Congress
5	Rajendra Shukla		Rewa	13 December 2023	Incumbent	2 years, 268 days	Mohan Yadav	Bharatiya Janata Party
5	Jagdish Devda		Malhargarh	13 December 2023	Incumbent	2 years, 268 days	Mohan Yadav	Bharatiya Janata Party

== Oath as the state deputy chief minister ==
The deputy chief minister serves five years in the office. The following is the oath of the Deputy chief minister of state:

I, <Name of Deputy Chief Minister>, do swear in the name of God/solemnly affirm that I will bear true faith and allegiance to the Constitution of India as by law established, that I will uphold the sovereignty and integrity of India, that I will faithfully and conscientiously discharge my duties as a Minister for the State of () and that I will do right to all manner of people in accordance with the Constitution and the law without fear or favour, affection or ill-will.

Oath of Secrecy

"I, [Name], do swear in the name of God / solemnly affirm that I will not directly or indirectly communicate or reveal to any person or persons any matter which shall be brought under my consideration or shall become known to me as a Minister for the State of [Name of State] except as may be required for the due discharge of my duties as such Minister."Pad ki Shapath (Oath of Office) "Main, [DCM ka Naam], Ishwar ki shapath leta hoon / satyanishtha se pratigyan karta hoon ki main vidhi dwara sthapit Bharat ke Samvidhan ke prati sachi shraddha aur nishtha rakhunga. Main Bharat ki prabhuta aur akhandta akshunn rakhunga. Main [State ka Naam] ke Rajya ke Upa Mukhya Mantri ke roop mein apne kartavyon ka shraddhapoorvak aur shuddh antahkaran se nirvahan karunga, tatha main bhay ya pakshpat, anurag ya dwesh ke bina, sabhi prakar ke logon ke prati Samvidhan aur vidhi ke anusar nyay karunga." B. Gopniyata ki Shapath (Oath of Secrecy) "Main, [DCM ka Naam], Ishwar ki shapath leta hoon / satyanishtha se pratigyan karta hoon ki jo vishay [State ka Naam] ke Rajya ke Mukhya Mantri ke roop mein mere vichar ke liye laya jayega athva mujhe gyaat hoga, use kisi vyakti ya vyaktityon ko, tab ke sivay jab ki aise UpaMukhya Mantri ke roop mein apne kartavyon ke uchit nirvahan ke liye aisa karna apekshit ho, main pratyaksh (directly) ya apratyaksh (indirectly) roop mein sansuchit ya prakat nahi karunga."

== See also ==
- List of current Indian deputy chief ministers
