= Harsud Assembly constituency =

Constituency of the Madhya Pradesh legislative assembly in India

Coordinates: 22.10°N 76.74°E

Harsud
- Constituency No. 176 for the Madhya Pradesh Legislative Assembly

Constituency details
- Country: India
- Region: Central India
- State: Madhya Pradesh
- District: Khandwa
- Lok Sabha constituency: Betul
- Established: 1972
- Reservation: ST

Member of Legislative Assembly
- 16th Madhya Pradesh Legislative Assembly
- Incumbent Kunwar Vijay Shah
- Party: Bharatiya Janata Party
- Elected year: 2023
- Preceded by: Aasharam Petu Patel

Harsud is one of the 230 Vidhan Sabha (Legislative Assembly) constituencies of Madhya Pradesh state in central India.

It is part of Khandwa District and has been reserved for Scheduled Tribes since 1977. Since 1990, it has been represented by Kunwar Vijay Shah of the Bharatiya Janata Party who is from the former Makrai Royal Family.

== Members of the Legislative Assembly ==
Election	Name	Party
1957	Ramsingh Galba	Indian National Congress
1962	Rao Bhimsingh	Swatantra Party
1967	Kalicharan Sakargaye	Indian National Congress
1972	Kalicharan Sakargaye	Indian National Congress
1977	Suraj Mal Balu	Janata Party
1980	Motilal Manang	Bharatiya Janata Party
1985	Aasharam Petu Patel	Indian National Congress
1990	Kunwar Vijay Shah	Bharatiya Janata Party
1993	Kunwar Vijay Shah	Bharatiya Janata Party
1998	Kunwar Vijay Shah	Bharatiya Janata Party
2003	Kunwar Vijay Shah	Bharatiya Janata Party
2008	Kunwar Vijay Shah	Bharatiya Janata Party
2013	Kunwar Vijay Shah	Bharatiya Janata Party
2018	Kunwar Vijay Shah	Bharatiya Janata Party
2023	Kunwar Vijay Shah	Bharatiya Janata Party

== Election results ==
=== 2023 ===
2023 Madhya Pradesh Legislative Assembly election: Harsud
Party	Candidate	Votes	%	±%
BJP	Kunwar Vijay Shah	116,580	64.27	+12.27
INC	Sukhram Salve	56,584	31.2	−8.57
BSP	Vijaysingh Uike	2,192	1.21	−0.07
Independent	Bindya Bai Gopichand Patel	1,717	0.95	
NOTA	None of the above	3,061	1.69	−1.14
Majority		59,996	33.07	+20.84
Turnout		181,384	79.89	+0.91
BJP hold		Swing		

=== 2018 ===
2018 Madhya Pradesh Legislative Assembly election: Harsud
Party	Candidate	Votes	%	±%
BJP	Kunwar Vijay Shah	80,556	52.0	
INC	Sukhram Salve	61,607	39.77	
BSP	Vijay Singh S/O Ramsingh Uikey	1,981	1.28	
SS	Dayaram	1,749	1.13	
Independent	Bindiyabai	1,616	1.04	
Independent	Bhaiyalal Maikal	1,607	1.04	
NOTA	None of the above	4,385	2.83	
Majority		18,949	12.23	
Turnout		154,919	78.98	
BJP gain from		Swing		

== See also ==
- Khandwa district
- List of constituencies of the Madhya Pradesh Legislative Assembly
