= Department of Public Relations, Madhya Pradesh =

Agency within the Government of Madhya Pradesh

- जनसंपर्क विभाग, मध्यप्रदेश सरकार

Agency overview
- Jurisdiction: Madhya Pradesh
- Headquarters: Tagore Marg, Banganga Road, Bhopal, Madhya Pradesh 462003
- Agency executive: Director
- Website: mpinfo.org

The Department of Public Relations, Madhya Pradesh, commonly referred to as Jansamparak Madhya Pradesh, is an agency within the Government of Madhya Pradesh, established by the Home Department in 2006. Its headquarter is based in the capital of Bhopal at Jansampark Sanchalanalaya.

Madhya Pradesh has been charged with "disseminating information on various activities of the Government to the people through the media and providing feedback to the Government on important matters reflected in the media. DPR is also charged with activities connected with cultural affairs."

== Functions ==
The main functions of the Department of Public Relations are to organize visit of press representatives to different areas, accreditation of press representatives, issuing of certificates, publication, displaying classified advertisements in newspaper, centralized payment of bills, publications of publicity literature in different languages regarding the achievements, development programs of the Government, publicity of the achievements of the government within and outside the state through cultural program.

It also disseminates and propagates government policies, programs, schemes and achievements to enhance public awareness. The department also documents the progress and achievements of various departments.

The department assists the government in coordinating with various departments by capturing public perception and feedback on different issues and thorough analysis of news published in the media. In addition, the Department of Public Relations communicates with the government's view point among general public through media, disseminate policies, programs and achievements of various departments for educating people and mass communication by performing role of facilitator by using various, methods and resources of educating people and mass communication. Formation of creativeness for publicity of programs, schemes and achievements of various departments through poster, pamphlet, folder, booklet, etc. and to facilitate the advertisement work.
