= Government of Madhya Pradesh =

Indian state government

- Seat of Government: Bhopal
- Country: India
- Website: mp.gov.in

Legislative branch
- Assembly: Madhya Pradesh Legislative Assembly
- Speaker: Narendra Singh Tomar (BJP)
- Members in Assembly: 230

Executive branch
- Governor: Mangubhai C. Patel
- Chief Minister: Mohan Yadav (BJP)
- Deputy Chief Ministers: Jagdish Devda; Rajendra Shukla (BJP)
- Chief Secretary: Ashok Barnwal, IAS

Judiciary
- High Court: Madhya Pradesh High Court
- Chief Justice: Justice Alpesh Y. Kogje

Government of Madhya Pradesh (abbreviated as MP), also known as the State Government of Madhya Pradesh, or locally as the Madhya Pradesh Government, is the supreme governing authority of the Indian state of Madhya Pradesh and its 55 districts. It consists of an executive, led by the governor of Madhya Pradesh, a judiciary and a legislative branch. In 2000, the southern portion was broken off to form the new state of Chhattisgarh with its own government.

== Executive ==
Like other states in India, the head of state of Madhya Pradesh is the governor, appointed by the president of India on the advice of the Central government. The governor's post is largely ceremonial. The chief minister is the head of government and is vested with most of the executive powers and financial powers. Bhopal is the capital of Madhya Pradesh, and houses the Madhya Pradesh Vidhan Sabha (Legislative Assembly) and the secretariat.

=== Council of Ministers ===
On 25 December 2023, Chief Minister Mohan Yadav inducted 28 ministers into his council of ministers.

Portfolio	Minister	Took office	Left office	Party
Chief Minister and also in-charge of: Department of Home; Department of General Administration; Department of Public Relations; Department of Jails; Department of Mining; Department of Aviation; Department of Industrial Policies; Department of Investment Promotion; And all other departments not specifically assigned to any minister.	Mohan Yadav	13 December 2023	Incumbent	BJP
Deputy Chief Minister; Minister of Public Health; Minister of Medical Education	Rajendra Shukla	13 December 2023	Incumbent	BJP
Deputy Chief Minister; Minister of Finance; Minister of Commercial Tax	Jagdish Devda	13 December 2023	Incumbent	BJP
Minister of Panchayat and Rural Development	Prahlad Singh Patel	25 December 2023	Incumbent	BJP
Minister of Public Works	Rakesh Singh	25 December 2023	Incumbent	BJP
Minister of Transport; Minister of School Education	Uday Pratap Singh	25 December 2023	Incumbent	BJP
Minister of Urban Development; Minister of Housing; Minister of Parliamentary Affairs	Kailash Vijayvargiya	25 December 2023	Incumbent	BJP
Minister of Sports and Youth Affairs; Minister of Co-operatives	Vishvas Sarang	25 December 2023	Incumbent	BJP
Minister of Energy	Pradhuman Singh Tomar	25 December 2023	Incumbent	BJP
Minister of Water Resources	Tulsi Ram Silawat	25 December 2023	Incumbent	BJP
Minister of Farmers' Welfare; Minister of Agricultural Development	Adal Singh Kansana	25 December 2023	Incumbent	BJP
Minister of Social Justice; Minister of Horticulture; Minister of Food Processing	Narayan Singh Kushwah	25 December 2023	Incumbent	BJP
Minister of Tribal Affairs; Minister of Bhopal Gas Strategy Department	Kunwar Vijay Shah	25 December 2023	Incumbent	BJP
Minister of Revenue	Karan Singh Verma	25 December 2023	Incumbent	BJP
Minister of Public Health Engineering	Sampatiya Uikey	25 December 2023	Incumbent	BJP
Minister of Women and Child Development	Nirmala Bhuria	25 December 2023	Incumbent	BJP
Minister of Food and Civil Supplies	Govind Singh Rajput	25 December 2023	Incumbent	BJP
Minister of Higher Education; Minister of Technical Education	Inder Singh Parmar	25 December 2023	Incumbent	BJP
Minister of Scheduled Castes Welfare	Nagar Singh Chouhan	25 December 2023	Incumbent	BJP
Minister of Micro, Small and Medium Enterprises	Chetanya Kasyap	25 December 2023	Incumbent	BJP
Minister of Renewable Energy	Rakesh Shukla	25 December 2023	Incumbent	BJP
Minister of Forest And Environment	Ramnivas Rawat	8 July 2024	Incumbent	BJP

== Legislative ==
The present legislature of Madhya Pradesh is unicameral. The legislative house, Madhya Pradesh Vidhan Sabha consists of 230 Members of Legislative Assembly (MLA) elected directly from single-seat constituencies and one nominated member. Its term is 5 years, unless sooner dissolved.

On 1 February 2016 the Madhya Pradesh legislative assembly banned the use of English for government purposes, effectively Hindi will be used for all official purposes, and issued instructions to officials not to harass employees who do not know English. On 4 December 2017, Madhya Pradesh Assembly unanimously passed a Bill awarding death to those found guilty of raping girls aged 12 and below.

== Judicial ==
The Madhya Pradesh High Court, located in Jabalpur, has jurisdiction over the whole state. The current Chief Justice is Suresh Kumar Kait.

== Government agencies ==
- Department of Public Relations
