= Udaipura Assembly constituency =

Constituency of the Madhya Pradesh legislative assembly in India

Coordinates: 23.08°N 78.51°E

Udaipura
- Constituency No. 140 for the Madhya Pradesh Legislative Assembly

Constituency details
- Country: India
- Region: Central India
- State: Madhya Pradesh
- District: Raisen
- Lok Sabha constituency: Narmadapuram
- Established: 1972
- Reservation: None

Member of Legislative Assembly
- 16th Madhya Pradesh Legislative Assembly
- Incumbent Narendra Shivaji Patel
- Party: Bharatiya Janata Party
- Elected year: 2023
- Preceded by: Devendra Singh Patel

Udaipura Assembly constituency is one of the 230 Vidhan Sabha (Legislative Assembly) constituencies of Madhya Pradesh state in central India.

It is part of Raisen district.

== Members of the Legislative Assembly ==
| Election | Name | Party |
|---|---|---|
| 1962 | Shankar Dayal Sharma | Indian National Congress |
| 1967 | Shankar Dayal Sharma | Indian National Congress |
| 1972 | Goutam Sharma | Indian National Congress |
| 1977 | Goverdhan Singh | Janata Party |
| 1980 | Dilip Singh | Bharatiya Janata Party |
| 1985 | Vimla Sharma | Indian National Congress |
| 1990 | Rampal Singh | Bharatiya Janata Party |
| 1993 | Rampal Singh | Bharatiya Janata Party |
| 1998 | Rampal Singh | Bharatiya Janata Party |
| 2003 | Rampal Singh | Bharatiya Janata Party |
| 2008 | Bhagwan Singh Rajpoot | Indian National Congress |
| 2013 | Ramkishan Patel | Bharatiya Janata Party |
| 2018 | Devendra Singh Patel | Indian National Congress |
| 2023 | Narendra Shivaji Patel | Bharatiya Janata Party |

== Election results ==
=== 2023 ===
2023 Madhya Pradesh Legislative Assembly election: Udaipura
| Party | Candidate | Votes | % | ±% |
|---|---|---|---|---|
| BJP | Narendra Shivaji Patel | 124,279 | 57.67 | +13.26 |
| INC | Devendra Singh Patel | 81,456 | 37.8 | −11.14 |
| ASP(KR) | Babulal Choudhri Phalban | 3,120 | 1.45 | |
| NOTA | None of the above | 2,032 | 0.94 | −0.74 |
| Majority | | 42,823 | 19.87 | +15.34 |
| Turnout | | 215,488 | 82.4 | +4.02 |
| BJP gain from INC | | Swing | | |

=== 2018 ===
2018 Madhya Pradesh Legislative Assembly election: Udaipura
| Party | Candidate | Votes | % | ±% |
|---|---|---|---|---|
| INC | Devendra Singh Patel | 86,441 | 48.94 | |
| BJP | Ramkishan Patel | 78,440 | 44.41 | |
| BSP | Haribabu Dhakar | 2,007 | 1.14 | |
| Independent | Mohan Singh Chouhan | 1,644 | 0.93 | |
| NISHAD | Devendra Kumar Noriya (Pappu Bhaiya) Gram Thala | 1,597 | 0.9 | |
| NOTA | None of the above | 2,973 | 1.68 | |
| Majority | | 8,001 | 4.53 | |
| Turnout | | 176,612 | 78.38 | |
| INC gain from | | Swing | | |

== See also ==
Udaipura
