= Malhargarh Assembly constituency =

Constituency of the Madhya Pradesh legislative assembly in India

Coordinates: 24.28°N 74.99°E

Malhargarh
- Constituency No. 225 for the Madhya Pradesh Legislative Assembly

Constituency details
- Country: India
- Region: Central India
- State: Madhya Pradesh
- District: Mandsaur
- Lok Sabha constituency: Mandsaur
- Established: 2008
- Reservation: SC

Member of Legislative Assembly
- 16th Madhya Pradesh Legislative Assembly
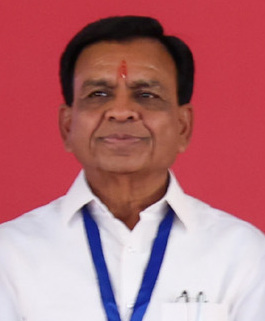
- Incumbent Jagdish Devda
- Party: Bharatiya Janata Party
- Elected year: 2023

Malhargarh is one of the 230 Vidhan Sabha (Legislative Assembly) constituencies of Madhya Pradesh state in central India. It was created in 2008 and it comprises Malhargarh tehsil and parts of Mandsour tehsil, both in Mandsaur district. As of 2023, its representative is Jagdish Devda of the Bharatiya Janata Party, who is a deputy CM of Madhya Pradesh.

== Members of the Legislative Assembly ==
Election	Name	Party
2008	Jagdish Devda	Bharatiya Janata Party
2013	Jagdish Devda	Bharatiya Janata Party
2018	Jagdish Devda	Bharatiya Janata Party
2023	Jagdish Devda	Bharatiya Janata Party

== Election results ==
=== 2023 ===
2023 Madhya Pradesh Legislative Assembly election: Malhargarh
Party	Candidate	Votes	%	±%
BJP	Jagdish Devda	115,498	54.2	+3.17
Independent	Shyamlal Jokchand	56,474	26.5	
INC	Parshuram Sisodiya	36,163	16.97	−27.99
NOTA	None of the above	1,730	0.81	−0.13
Majority		59,024	27.7	+21.63
Turnout		213,094	86.73	+0.23
BJP hold		Swing		

=== 2018 ===
2018 Madhya Pradesh Legislative Assembly election: Malhargarh
Party	Candidate	Votes	%	±%
BJP	Jagdish Devda	99,839	51.03	
INC	Parshuram Sisodiya	87,967	44.96	
NOTA	None of the above	1,848	0.94	
Majority		11,872	6.07	
Turnout		195,652	86.5	
BJP hold		Swing		

== See also ==
- Malhargarh
