= Jagdish Devda =

Indian politician

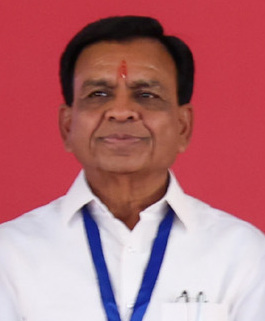

5th Deputy Chief Minister of Madhya Pradesh
- Incumbent
- Assumed office 13 December 2023 Serving with Rajendra Shukla
- Governor: Mangubhai C. Patel
- Chief Minister: Mohan Yadav
- Preceded by: Jamuna Devi (1998-2003)

Cabinet Minister Madhya Pradesh Government
- Incumbent
- Assumed office 2 July 2020
- Chief Minister: Mohan Yadav; Shivraj Singh Chouhan
- Ministry & Departments: Finance; Commercial Taxes; Planning, Economic & Statistics
- Preceded by: Tarun Bhanot

Member of the Madhya Pradesh Legislative Assembly
- Incumbent
- Assumed office December 2008
- Constituency: Malhargarh
- In office 2003–2008
- Preceded by: Pushpa Bharatiya
- Succeeded by: Radhe Shyam Patidar
- In office 1990–1998
- Preceded by: Asharam Vermai
- Succeeded by: Pushpa Bharatiya
- Constituency: Suwasra

Personal details
- Born: 1 July 1957 (age 69)
- Party: Bharatiya Janata Party
- Spouse: Renu Devda
- Education: M.A., LL.B.
- Alma mater: Vikram University

Jagdish Devda is an Indian politician from the Bharatiya Janata Party & 6th deputy chief minister of Madhya Pradesh alongside Rajendra Shukla from 2023. He is representing Malhargarh Assembly constituency as an MLA for the 6th time in Madhya Pradesh Legislative Assembly.

== Early life ==
Devda completed the Master of Arts and Law degree from Vikram University, Ujjain.

== Political career ==
In 2023 Madhya Pradesh Legislative Assembly election, Devda won the Malhargarh Assembly constituency as a Bharatiya Janata Party candidate which he has been representing since the last 6 elections.

On December 13, 2023, Devda was appointed Deputy Chief Minister of Madhya Pradesh along with Rajendra Shukla in the Ministry of Mohan Yadav. He also had the responsibility of Finance & Commercial Tax in the Government of Madhya Pradesh.
