= Govind Singh Rajput =

Indian politician (born 1963)

Cabinet Minister Government of Madhya Pradesh
- Incumbent
- Assumed office 3 January 2021

Minister for Revenue and Transport Government of Madhya Pradesh
- In office 12 July 2020 – 20 October 2020
- Preceded by: Govind Singh Rajput

Minister for Food & Civil supplies and Consumer affairs Government of Madhya Pradesh
- In office 21 April 2020 – 12 July 2020
- Chief Minister: Shivraj Singh Chouhan
- Preceded by: Pradhumn Singh Tomar; INC
- Succeeded by: Bisahulal Singh

Minister for Revenue and Transport Government of Madhya Pradesh
- In office 27 December 2018 – 20 March 2020
- Chief Minister: Kamal Nath

Member of Legislative Assembly Madhya Pradesh
- Incumbent
- Assumed office 10 November 2020
- Constituency: Surkhi
- In office 2018 December – 2020 March
- Constituency: Surkhi
- In office 2003–2013
- Constituency: Surkhi

Personal details
- Born: 22 August 1963 (age 63)
- Party: Bharatiya Janata Party
- Children: Akash Singh Rajput

Govind Singh Rajput is an Indian politician from The Bharatiya Janata Party who is the cabinet minister in Government of Madhya Pradesh. Rajput was a Member of Madhya Pradesh Legislative Assembly from Surkhi in Sagar district from December 2018 to March 2020.

== Political career ==
In December 2018, he was inducted into the Kamal Nath cabinet as Minister of Revenue & Transport in Madhya Pradesh. During 2020 Madhya Pradesh political crisis, he supported former Congress leader Jyotiraditya Scindia and was one of the 22 MLAs who resigned and Joined Bharatiya Janata Party. And on 21 April 2020, he became a cabinet minister.

== See also ==
- 2020 Madhya Pradesh political crisis
