= Narendra Shivaji Patel =

Indian politician

Narendra Shivaji Patel (born 1971) is an Indian politician from Madhya Pradesh. He is an MLA from Udaipura Assembly constituency in Raisen District. He won the 2023 Madhya Pradesh Legislative Assembly election, representing the Bharatiya Janata Party.

== Early life and education ==
Patel is from Udaipura, Raisen District, Madhya Pradesh. He is the son of Shivaji. He completed his bachelors in civil engineering in 1990 at Samrat Ashok Engineering College, Vidisha.

== Career ==
Patel won from Udaipura Assembly constituency in the 2023 Madhya Pradesh Legislative Assembly election representing Bharatiya Janata Party. He polled 124,279 votes and defeated his nearest rival and sitting MLA, Devendra Singh Gadarwa of the Indian National Congress, by a margin of 42,823 votes.
