= Kunwar Vijay Shah =

Indian politician

Kunwar Vijay Shah (born 1 November 1962) is an Indian politician from Madhya Pradesh. He is an eight-time MLA from Harsud Assembly constituency, which is reserved for Scheduled Tribe community, in Khandwa District. He has represented the constituency for over three decades winning all the eight elections from 1990 to 2023. He last won the 2023 Madhya Pradesh Legislative Assembly election, representing the Bharatiya Janata Party.

== Early life and education ==
Shah is from the royal family of Makrai state, Harda district, Madhya Pradesh. He completed his M.A. in history in 1986 at Devi Ahilya Vishwavidyalaya, Indore. His wife is in the team that runs the family businesses. He is the brother of Raja Ajay Shah and the son of Raja Devi Shah of Makrai State. His family ruled Makrai state for about three centuries. Kunwar translates to Prince.

== Career ==
Shah won from Harsud Assembly constituency in the 2023 Madhya Pradesh Legislative Assembly election representing the Bharatiya Janata Party. He polled 116,580 votes and defeated his nearest rival, Sukhram Salve of the Indian National Congress, by a margin of 59,996 votes. He first became an MLA winning the 1990 Madhya Pradesh Legislative Assembly election. Thereafter, he won every election from Harsud in 1993, 1998, 2003, 2008, 2013, 2018 and 2023.

He was the forest minister in the Shivraj Singh Chauhan fourth ministry. Earlier, he was minister of school education in the Third Chouhan ministry. He also served various ministries including tribal affairs, tourism, public asset management, panchayat raj and rural development.

== Controversy ==
In May 2025, an FIR was filed against Shah for allegedly making defamatory remarks against Colonel Sofia Qureshi, an Indian Army officer, who attended the media briefings during Operation Sindoor. The High Court of Madhya Pradesh took it up suo moto and directed the state director general of police to file the FIR. Shah claimed that his statement was misinterpreted and later issued an apology. He challenged the FIR in the Supreme Court, but he was asked to apologise in the High Court.
