= Mohan Yadav =

Chief Minister of Madhya Pradesh (born 1965)

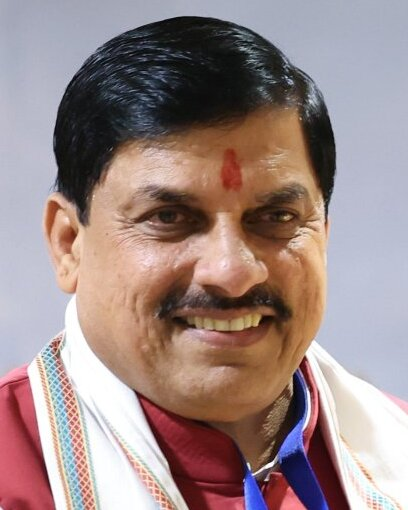

19th Chief Minister of Madhya Pradesh
- Incumbent
- Assumed office 13 December 2023
- Governor: Mangubhai C. Patel
- Deputy: Rajendra Shukla; Jagdish Devda
- Cabinet: Mohan Yadav
- Preceded by: Shivraj Singh Chouhan

Minister of Higher Education Government of Madhya Pradesh
- In office 2 July 2020 – 11 December 2023
- Chief Minister: Shivraj Singh Chouhan
- Preceded by: Jitu Patwari
- Succeeded by: Inder Singh Parmar

Member of Madhya Pradesh Legislative Assembly
- Incumbent
- Assumed office 2013
- Preceded by: Shivnarayan Jagirdar
- Constituency: Ujjain South

Personal details
- Born: 25 March 1965 (age 61) Ujjain, Madhya Pradesh, India
- Party: Bharatiya Janata Party
- Spouse: Seema Yadav
- Children: 3
- Education: Vikram University (BSc, LLB, M.A., MBA, PhD)
- Profession: Politician; businessperson; attorney
- Website: Official website

Mohan Yadav (born 25 March 1965) is an Indian politician serving as the current Chief Minister of Madhya Pradesh and also serving as leader of the house in legislative assembly. A member of the Bharatiya Janata Party, he represents Ujjain South constituency as Member of Legislative Assembly of Madhya Pradesh since 2013.

== Early life and education ==
On 25 March 1965, Mohan Yadav was born in Ujjain, Madhya Pradesh. He is married to Seema Yadav, and together they have three children — one daughter and two sons.

Yadav graduated from Vikram University with a Bachelor of Science (B.Sc.) degree.

A lawyer by profession, he has an MBA, and a PhD and master's in political science

== Political career ==
Yadav won his first election in 1982, when he contested the student union polls at Madhav Science College in Ujjain. He was elected joint secretary. Two years later he became the president.Yadav went on to hold several posts in Akhil Bharatiya Vidyarthi Parishad at Ujjain City and state level, before becoming its national secretary in 1990–92. He got active in RSS in 1993–95, when he showed his organizational abilities as Ujjain Sah Khand Karyavah and was made state president of Bhartiya Janta Yuva Morcha.

In 2013, he entered electoral politics and ran for the Ujjain South constituency. He won by beating Congress candidate Jaysingh Darbar in the Ujjain South constituency of the 2013 Madhya Pradesh Assembly Election by 9,652 votes. Yadav got 73,108 votes, whereas, Darbar received 63,456.

He was re-elected in the 2018 Madhya Pradesh Legislative Assembly elections, taking the seat of MLA for Ujjain South. He won by 18,960 votes over Congress candidate Rajendra Vashishtha Raju Bhaiya.

In 2020, he was sworn in as a cabinet member of the Madhya Pradesh government under the former Chief Minister Shivraj Singh Chouhan. He was MP's Minister of Education till 2023.

In the 2023 Madhya Pradesh State Assembly Elections, he ran from the Ujjain South constituency and won.

== Chief Minister of Madhya Pradesh ==
On 11 December 2023, BJP announced that Mohan Yadav will serve as the 19th Chief Minister of Madhya Pradesh along with Rajendra Shukla and Jagdish Devda as deputy. The announcement came after the BJP Legislative member's meeting. Following the BJP's victory in the elections on 3 December, the BJP held the legislative party meet with the Central observers to select chief minister for the state. In a surprising turn of events, the party named Mohan Yadav as the face of the new Chief Minister.

On 13 December, Yadav took oath as the 19th Chief Minister of the state in the presence of Prime Minister Narendra Modi, Amit Shah, outgoing chief minister Shivraj Singh Chouhan and several other dignitaries.

After taking charge Chief Minister Mohan Yadav banned the use of loudspeakers beyond permissible limits and time at all religious and public places as per the guidelines of the Supreme court. Yadav said the efforts to remove loudspeakers shall be carried out in co-ordination with religious leaders.

One of the first decisions taken by Yadav's cabinet is to enact a complete ban on the open sale of non-vegetarian food like meat, fish & eggs within the state as per the Food Safety Act and the guidelines of the Central government.

After the inauguration of Yadav's government, homes of three men who allegedly attacked a BJP worker were razed by bulldozers on 15 December 2023.

=== Strengthening flood preparedness and monsoon relief measures ===
On July 22, 2025, Chief Minister Mohan Yadav chaired a comprehensive review meeting to bolster Madhya Pradesh's flood alert and response system. He emphasized the urgent need for an enhanced flood alert mechanism and continuous river‑level monitoring, especially in districts currently receiving above‑average monsoon rainfall such as Tikamgarh, Mandla, Chhatarpur, Niwari, and Sidhi. The State had already recorded over 61% of its seasonal average rainfall, prompting the CM to direct officials to proactively establish relief camps, ensure timely availability of shelter and food, and work closely with social and religious organizations to aid affected communities. He also urged the implementation of public disaster preparedness training and mock drills, especially in advance of monsoon festivals, to minimize disruption and potential loss of life.

Yadav's focus on early warning systems, community coordination, and administrative readiness reflects a push toward proactive governance rather than reactive crisis management. Such steps are intended to minimize casualties and economic losses during peak monsoon periods. The tone of this intervention suggests his administration values preparedness planning and inclusion of local stakeholders in relief efforts. By prioritizing disaster readiness alongside routine administration, the CM is extending his leadership into humanitarian planning and climate resilience — an increasingly critical domain in Madhya Pradesh's evolving development narrative.[8]

=== Driving investment growth ===
In early July 2025, Madhya Pradesh Chief Minister Mohan Yadav spearheaded a major industrial push by conducting the bhoomi pujan (groundbreaking ceremony) for five new industrial units in Bhopal's Acharpura industrial area, with a combined investment of ₹406 crore. These projects, spanning textiles, pharmaceuticals, electronics, and agritech, are expected to generate more than 1,500 jobs. Notably, during his visit to one of the upcoming facilities—Gokaldas Exports, which plans to employ over 2,500 women—he personally distributed land allotment letters to industrial representatives. The event also included the formal handover of land letters to eight additional businesses planning to set up operations in the state. These actions align with the government's broader vision of making Madhya Pradesh a prime investment destination. Further strengthening this goal, Yadav returned from international visits to Dubai and Spain with investment proposals worth over ₹11,000 crore, marking one of the most significant foreign outreach achievements by his administration. The Dubai visit also secured a direct flight route between Bhopal and Dubai, expected to boost trade and tourism. In Spain, Yadav pitched Madhya Pradesh as a low-cost, eco-friendly textile hub aligned with ESG norms under the PM Mitra scheme and held talks with major brands like Inditex. These developments signal a clear commitment to industrial growth, employment generation, and global collaboration to reshape the state's economic future. [9]

== Electoral Performance ==
Madhya Pradesh Legislative Assembly
Year	Constituency	Party	Votes	%	Opponent	Party	Opponent Votes	%	Margin	Margin in %	Result
2013	Ujjain South	BJP	73,108	51.64%	Jaysingh Darbar	INC	63,456	44.82%	8,360	6.825%	Won
2018	Ujjain South	BJP	78,178	46.71%	Rajendra Vashishtha	INC	59,218	35.38%	18,960	11.33%	Won
2023	Ujjain South	BJP	95,699	52.08%	Chetan Premnarayan Yadav	INC	82,758	45.04%	12,941	7.04%	Won

== Controversies ==
=== Bajrang Bali welcome controversy ===
Controversy unfolded as a person dressed as Hanuman, a revered deity in Hinduism, welcomed the newly appointed Madhya Pradesh Chief Minister, Mohan Yadav, at an event in Ujjain. The incident, caught on video, depicted the individual mimicking flight to present Yadav with a garland while hanging from a crane.

The Congress party condemned the incident, with its spokesperson questioning the necessity of hanging a depiction of Bajrang Bali on a crane to welcome the Chief Minister.

=== Prime Meridian Controversy ===
Madhya Pradesh Chief Minister Mohan Yadav stirred controversy with his claim that India played a pivotal role in establishing global time standards around 300 years ago. Asserting that Ujjain still houses an ancient timekeeping instrument, Yadav announced his government's ambition to shift the Prime Meridian from Greenwich, England, to Ujjain, challenging the established international reference for time.

=== Chief minister Land Scam ===
The controversy surrounding Madhya Pradesh Chief Minister Mohan Yadav involves allegations by the opposition Congress party that his family used insider information to orchestrate a massive ₹45-crore land scam in Ujjain. The political row erupted in late June 2026 following an investigative media report detailing extensive property acquisitions by companies and relatives connected to the Chief Minister.

== Awards and recognition ==
- He was awarded by the President of India in 2011–2012 and 2012–2013 for promoting tourism in the state. Yadav's rise began with the ABVP. In 1982, he became the co-secretary of the student union of Madhav Science College, and became the president in 1984.
