= Sampatiya Uikey =

Indian politician

Member of Parliament, Rajya Sabha
- Preceded by: Anil Madhav Dave
- Constituency: Madhya Pradesh

Personal details
- Born: 4 September 1967 (age 58) Shurkhi, Mandla, Madhya Pradesh
- Party: Bharatiya Janata Party
- Spouse: Late Sanjay Uikey
- Children: 4
- Education: Intermediate, M. P. Board, Mandla
- Profession: Agriculturist/Farmer, Social Worker, Politician
- Source

Sampatiya Uikey (born 4 September 1967) is an Indian politician who is a tribal leader of the Bharatiya Janata Party from Madhya Pradesh. Public health engineering minister On 31 July 2017, she was elected unopposed to the Rajya Sabha from the state of Madhya Pradesh in the bypoll necessitated by the demise of Union Minister Shri Anil Madhav Dave. Her term will end as per the original term on 29 June 2022.

She was president of district Panchayat in Mandla district, Madhya Pradesh. In 2023 She was elected as a member of legislative assembly from Mandla assembly of Madhya Pradesh. She is the cabinet minister in Mohan Yadav Cabinet.

Her party, Bhartiya Janata Party has become the largest party in the Rajya Sabha with 58 members, overtaking Indian National Congress by one seat with Sampathiya Uikey being sworn in as member of the House of Elders on 4 August 2017.

In 2023, she was elected as a Member of the Madhya Pradesh Legislative Assembly from Mandla constituency. After the formation of the Mohan Yadav government, she was appointed as a Cabinet Minister in the state government.
