= Mangubhai C. Patel =

Governor of Madhya Pradesh

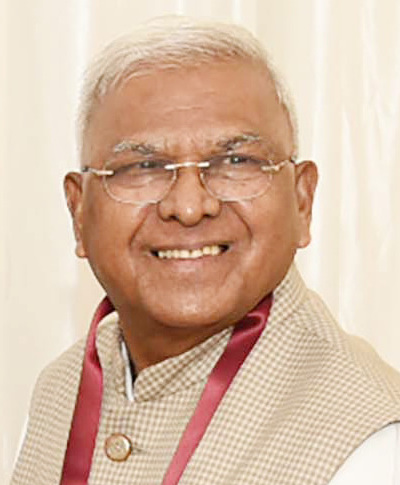
- Patel, c. 2023

Governor of Madhya Pradesh
- Incumbent
- Assumed office 6 July 2021
- Chief Minister: Shivraj Singh Chouhan (Until 13 December 2023); Mohan Yadav (From 13 December 2023)
- Preceded by: Anandiben Patel

Cabinet Minister in Gujarat
- In office 2002–2013
- Constituency: Navsari

Deputy Speaker of the Gujarat Legislative Assembly
- In office 3 October 2013 – 20 November 2014

Member of Gujarat Legislative Assembly
- In office 2012–2017
- Preceded by: Khamoshiyan Patel
- Succeeded by: Naresh Patel
- Constituency: Gandevi
- In office 1990–2012
- Constituency: Navsari

Personal details
- Born: 1 June 1944 (age 82) Navsari, Bombay State, British India (present-day Gujarat, India)
- Party: Bharatiya Janata Party

Mangubhai Chhaganbhai Patel is an Indian statesman who is the Governor of Madhya Pradesh since July 2021. He is a leader of the Bharatiya Janata Party from Gujarat. He served as the officiating speaker of the Gujarat Legislative Assembly in 2014. He has earlier served as a cabinet minister in the Government of Gujarat. Patel was elected to the assembly from Navsari constituency. He has been appointed 19th Governor of Madhya Pradesh on 6 July 2021 by the President of India.

== Political career ==
Mangubhai is a Tribal Leader. He was elected MLA from Navsari constituency from 1990 to 2012 and from 2012 to 2017 from Gandevi Vidhansabha. He was Cabinet Minister in Gujarat Government. He was elected as Deputy Speaker of Gujarat Vidhansabha in October 2013. On 6 July 2021, he was appointed Governor of Madhya Pradesh state by the President of India Ram Nath Kovind Ji. He has earlier served as a cabinet minister in the Government of Gujarat. Patel was elected to the assembly from Navsari constituency.

== Governorships (2021 - Incumbent) ==
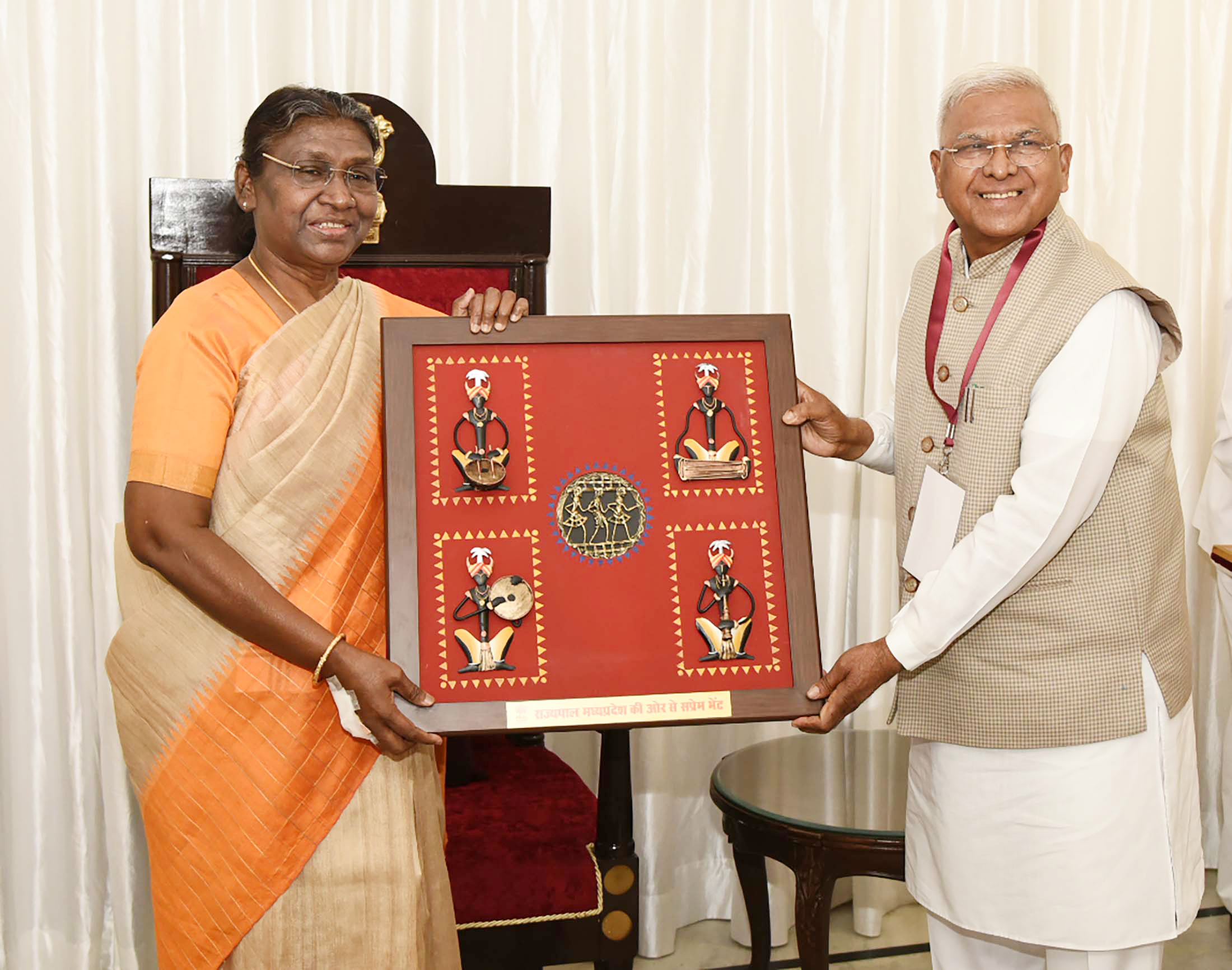
The Governor of Madhya Pradesh, Mangubhai C. Patel met President Droupadi Murmu on 3 March 2023.

=== Governor of Madhya Pradesh (2021 - Incumbent) ===
He has been appointed 30th Governor of Madhya Pradesh on 6 July 2021 by the President of India.

Government offices
Preceded by Anandiben Patel; Additional charge	Governor of Madhya Pradesh; 6 July 2021 – Present	Incumbent
