= Balaghat Lok Sabha constituency =

Lok Sabha constituency in Madhya Pradesh

Coordinates: 21°48′N 80°11′E

Balaghat
- Lok Sabha constituency
- Interactive Map Outlining Balaghat Lok Sabha constituency

Constituency details
- Country: India
- Region: Central India
- State: Madhya Pradesh
- Assembly constituencies: Baihar; Lanji; Paraswada; Balaghat; Waraseoni; Katangi; Barghat; Seoni
- Established: 1952
- Total electors: 18,73,653
- Reservation: None

Member of Parliament
- 18th Lok Sabha
- Incumbent Bharti Pardhi
- Party: Bharatiya Janata Party
- Elected year: 2024

Balaghat is one of the 29 Lok Sabha constituencies in Madhya Pradesh state in central India. This constituency covers the entire Balaghat district and part of Seoni district.

== Assembly segments ==
Like most other Lok Sabha seats in MP and Chhattisgarh, with few seats like Durg (which has nine assembly segments under it) being exceptions, Balaghat Lok Sabha seat has 8 assembly seats as its segments. Presently, since the delimitation of the parliamentary and legislative assembly constituencies in 2008, Balaghat Lok Sabha constituency comprises the following eight Vidhan Sabha (Legislative Assembly) segments:

#	Name	District	Member	Party	2024 Lead
108	Baihar (ST)	Balaghat	Sanjay Uikey	INC	BJP
109	Lanji	Balaghat	Rajkumar Karrahe	BJP	BJP
110	Paraswada	Balaghat	Madhubhau Bhagat	INC	BJP
111	Balaghat	Balaghat	Anubha Munjare	INC	BJP
112	Waraseoni	Balaghat	Vivek Vicky Patel	INC	BJP
113	Katangi	Balaghat	Gaurav Singh Pardhi	BJP	BJP
114	Barghat (ST)	Seoni	Kamal Marskole	BJP	BJP
115	Seoni	Seoni	Dinesh Rai Munmun	BJP	BJP

== Members of Parliament ==
Year	Member	Party
1952	Chintaman Rao Gautam	Indian National Congress
1957	Chintaman Rao Gautam	Indian National Congress
1962	Bholaram Ramaji	Praja Socialist Party
1967	Chintaman Dhivruji	Indian National Congress
1971	Chintaman Dhivruji	Indian National Congress
1977	Kacharu Lal Hemraj Jain	Republican Party of India (K)
1980	Nandkishore Sharma	Indian National Congress (I)
1984	Nandkishore Sharma	Indian National Congress
1989	Kankar Munjare	Independent
1991	Vishveshwar Bhagat	Indian National Congress
1996	Vishveshwar Bhagat	Indian National Congress
1998	Gaurishankar Bisen	Bharatiya Janata Party
1999	Prahlad Patel	Bharatiya Janata Party
2004	Gaurishankar Bisen	Bharatiya Janata Party
2009	K. D. Deshmukh	Bharatiya Janata Party
2014	Bodh Singh Bhagat	Bharatiya Janata Party
2019	Dhal Singh Bisen	Bharatiya Janata Party
2024	Bharti Pardhi	Bharatiya Janata Party

== Election results ==
Vote share of Winning candidates
2024	51.56%
2019	50.74%
2014	43.17%
2009	39.65%
2004	31.84%
1999	43.47%
1998	40.27%
1996	30.91%
1991	40.82%
1989	34.25%
1984	41.73%
1980	56.73%
1977	53.89%
1971	59.19%
1967	50.57%
1962	39.79%
1957	54.62%
1952	65.56%

=== 2024 ===
2024 Indian general election: Balaghat
Party	Candidate	Votes	%	±%
BJP	Bharti Pardhi	712,660	51.56	+0.82
INC	Samrat Saraswat	5,38,148	38.93	+5.84
GGP	Nandlal Uikey	12,422	0.9	new
NOTA	None of the above	11,510	0.83	+0.52
Majority		174,512	12.63	−4.44
Turnout		13,76,207 (Note: does not include postal ballots)	73.45	▼4.21
BJP hold		Swing		

=== 2019 ===
2019 Indian general elections: Balaghat
Party	Candidate	Votes	%	±%
BJP	Dhal Singh Bisen	696,102	50.74	+7.57
INC	Madhu Bhagat	4,54,036	33.09	−1.45
BSP	Kankar Munjare	85,177	6.21	+2.05
IND	Bodh Singh Bhagat	47,220	3.44	new
NOTA	None of the Above	4,242	0.31	−0.31
Majority		2,42,066	17.07	+8.44
Turnout		13,72,730	77.66	+9.34
BJP hold		Swing		

=== 2014 ===
2014 Indian general elections: Balaghat
Party	Candidate	Votes	%	±%
BJP	Bodh Singh Bhagat	4,80,594	43.17	+3.52
INC	Hina Likhiram Kavre	3,84,553	34.54	+0.29
SP	Anubha Munjare	99,392	8.93	+5.03
BSP	Yogesh Nanaji Samrite	46,345	4.16	−0.49
CPI	Ashok Kumar Masih	20,297	1.82	new
NOTA	None of the Above	6,922	0.62	new
Majority		96,041	8.63	+3.23
Turnout		11,13,364	68.32	+11.83
BJP hold		Swing		

=== 2009 ===
2009 Indian general elections: Balaghat
Party	Candidate	Votes	%	±%
BJP	K. D. Deshmukh	2,99,959	39.65	N/A
INC	Vishveshwar Bhagat	2,59,140	34.25	N/A
RJD	Kankar Munjare	48,800	6.45	N/A
BSP	Ajab Lal	35,203	4.65	N/A
SP	Kishor Samrite	29,525	3.90	N/A
GGP	Bhaiya Balkrishna	20,645	2.73	N/A
Majority		40,819	5.40	N/A
Turnout		7,56,541	56.49	N/A
BJP hold		Swing		

=== 2004 ===
2004 Indian general election: Balaghat
Party	Candidate	Votes	%	±%
BJP	Gauri Shankar Chaturbhuj Bisen	193,982	31.84	
JP	Kankar Munjare	105,893	17.38	
GGP	Hirasan Uikey	97,197	15.95	
INC	Pushpa Bisen	85,142	13.98	
BSP	Udaysingh Pancheshwar	72,391	11.88	
IND	Dr. Bhikkhoo R. D. K. Pragyasheel	16,486	2.71	
SP	Kishor Samrite	15,516	2.55	
RLD	Govardhan S/O Kunwarlal Mohare	8,905	1.46	
RPI	Siddharth Gajbhiye (Adhivakta)	7,418	1.22	
IND	Dhaneshawar Lilhare	6,391	1.05	
Majority		88,089	14.46	
Turnout				
BJP hold		Swing		

=== 1999 ===
1999 Indian general election: Balaghat
Party	Candidate	Votes	%	±%
BJP	Prahlad Singh Patel	251,308	43.47	
INC	Vishweshwer Bhagat	230,630	39.90	
JP	Anubha Munjare	52,392	9.06	
BSP	Udaysingh Pancheswar	29,733	5.14	
GGP	Hiradhar Verma	5,726	0.99	
JD(U)	Pritamsingh Uikey	2,688	0.46	
IND	Kaviraj Meshram	1,325	0.23	
IND	Vijay Kumar Patil "Bauddh"	1,186	0.21	
IND	Dr. R. D. Kathane	1,183	0.20	
IND	Mahipal Sulakhe	1,156	0.20	
AJBP (Note: Ajeya Bharat Party)	Rajesh Gupta (Pappu Bhaiya)	545	0.09	
IND	Sahabsingh Saiyam	194	0.03	
Majority		20,678	3.58	
Turnout		583,843	63.71	
BJP hold		Swing		

=== 1998 ===
1998 Indian general election: Balaghat
Party	Candidate	Votes	%	±%
BJP	Gaurishankar Chaturbhuj Bisen	240,066	40.27	
INC	Vishaveshwar Bhagat	214,535	35.99	
SJP	Kanker Munjare	86,277	14.47	
BSP	Ad. K. D. L. Choure	36,212	6.07	
AJBP	Rajesh Kumar Gupta	10,540	1.77	
IND	Dr. R. D. Kathane	2,863	0.48	
IND	Moolakraj Anand	2,137	0.36	
SVSP (Note: Savarn Samaj Party)	Sudhakar Sharma	2,105	0.35	
IND	Govardhan Patle alias Hitlar	1,396	0.23	
Majority		25,531	4.28	
Turnout		605,480	69.83	
Swing to BJP from INC		Swing		

=== 1996 ===
1996 Indian general election: Balaghat
Party	Candidate	Votes	%	±%
INC	Vishveshwar Bhagat	171,569	30.91	
BJP	Gaurishankar Chaturbhuj Bisen	170,312	30.68	
KSM (Note: Krantikari Samajwadi Manch)	Kankar Munjare	112,185	20.21	
IND	Dhruva Ratansingh	29,656	5.34	
RPI(A)	Domansingh Nagpure	22,640	4.08	
BSP	Vijay Beniram Vare	15,781	2.84	
IND	17 Independent Candidates	32,977	5.93	
Majority		1,257	0.23	
Turnout				
INC hold		Swing		

=== 1991 ===
1991 Indian general election: Balaghat
Party	Candidate	Votes	%	±%
INC	Vishveshwar Bhagat	185,491	40.82	
BJP	Gourishankar Chaturbhuj	129,265	28.45	
JD	Kankar Munjare	123,234	27.12	
JP	Shivbhajan Daddu Bhawre	1,236	0.27	
DDP	Devilal Dudhiya Tatdhari	928	0.20	
IND	13 Independent Candidates	14,254	3.13	
Majority		56,226	12.37	
Turnout		461,260	56.88	
Swing to INC from Independent		Swing		

=== 1989 ===
1989 Indian general election: Balaghat
Party	Candidate	Votes	%	±%
IND	Kankar Munjare	177,870	34.25	
JD	K. D. Deshmukh	167,404	32.24	
INC	Nandkishore Sharma	134,234	25.85	
RPI(K)	Moochand Shambharkar	13,529	2.61	
IND	Kishan Lal Ambadare	6,169	1.19	
BSP	Omkar Prasad	4,372	0.84	
IND	Jangal Singh	3,893	0.75	
DDP	Raghunath Singh	3,777	0.73	
IND	Santosh Kumar	2,498	0.48	
IND	Panchulal	1,718	0.33	
IND	Y. K. Shukla	1,364	0.26	
IND	Anant Lal	1,337	0.26	
IND	Samelal Singh	1,112	0.21	
Majority		10,466	2.01	
Turnout		533,206	67.41	
Swing to Independent from INC		Swing		

=== 1984 ===
1984 Indian general election: Balaghat
Party	Candidate	Votes	%	±%
INC	Nandkishore Sharma	169,497	41.73	
BJP	Lochanlal Narayan Thakre	101,380	24.96	
IND	Kankar Munjare	73,789	18.16	
IND	Mulchand Shambhakar	20,184	4.97	
JP	Itthal Baheswar	14,429	3.55	
IND	Dharm Raj	13,527	3.33	
IND	Dayaram	5,518	1.36	
IND	Shankarlal Kasar	2,922	0.72	
IND	S. R. Silare	2,704	0.67	
IND	Nimarchand	2,266	0.56	
Majority		68,117	16.77	
Turnout		420,107	66.07	
INC hold		Swing		

=== 1980 ===
1980 Indian general election: Balaghat
Party	Candidate	Votes	%	±%
INC(I)	Nandkishore Sharma	189,743	56.73	
JP	Hukamchand Kachwai Munnalal	76,370	22.83	
JP(S)	Moharsingh Tundilal	37,915	11.34	
RPI(K)	Moolchand Shambharker	25,083	7.50	
IND	Inderchand Jain Phoolchand	5,368	1.60	
Majority		113,373	33.90	
Turnout		345,657	59.84	
Swing to INC(I) from RPI(K)		Swing		

=== 1977 ===
1977 Indian general election: Balaghat
Party	Candidate	Votes	%	±%
RPI(K)	Kacharu Lal Hemraj Jain	153,980	53.89	
INC	Chintaman Rao Gautam	104,272	36.49	
IND	Ramcharan Bhanware	8,276	2.90	
IND	Zummaklal Kishor	6,352	2.22	
IND	Ram Prasad Umare Namdeo	4,425	1.55	
IND	Puran Ganpat	2,698	0.94	
IND	Amarsingh Jalansingh	1,921	0.67	
IND	Mohanlal Saulakhe	1,734	0.61	
IND	Basantlal Nagpure	1,276	0.45	
IND	Rawanlal Dhedya	809	0.28	
Majority		49,708	17.40	
Turnout		299,484	54.78	
Swing to RPI(K) from INC		Swing		

=== 1971 ===
1971 Indian general election: Balaghat
Party	Candidate	Votes	%	±%
INC	Chintaman Rao Gautam	128,111	59.19	
IND	Ramcharan Bhanwarre	40,741	18.82	
INC(O)	Sheoram Bisen	23,481	10.85	
IND	Sonsingh Uiyake	9,096	4.20	
IND	Jaichand Prasad Dongre	6,775	3.13	
PSP	Komal Chand	4,823	2.23	
IND	Surajlal Dhuware	3,407	1.57	
Majority		87,370	40.37	
Turnout		229,210	47.46	
INC hold		Swing		

=== 1967 ===
1967 Indian general election: Balaghat
Party	Candidate	Votes	%	±%
INC	C. R. Gautam	125,540	50.57	
RPI	R. Bhanware	48,323	19.47	
PSP	B. R. Pardhi	34,220	13.79	
IND	R. Umre	15,818	6.37	
IND	R. Raghunath	13,090	5.27	
CPI	R. Pathak	11,237	4.53	
Majority		77,217	31.10	
Turnout		266,751	56.91	
Swing to INC from PSP		Swing		

=== 1962 ===
1962 Indian general election: Balaghat
Party	Candidate	Votes	%	±%
PSP	Bholaram Ramaji	69,786	39.79	
INC	Shankarlal Rajaram Tiwari	66,894	38.15	
RPI	Munnalal Dhiwruji	22,865	13.04	
IND	Fadalram Dewaji	15,821	9.02	
Majority		2,892	1.64	
Turnout		187,906	45.18	
Swing to PSP from INC		Swing		

=== 1957 ===
1957 Indian general election: Balaghat
Party	Candidate	Votes	%	±%
INC	Chintaman Dhivruji	97,932	54.62	
PSP	Damodar Brijlal Tembhre	35,414	19.75	
SCF	Haridas Damaji Awode	23,563	13.14	
IND	Kisanji Dharamji	22,372	12.48	
Majority		62,518	34.87	
Turnout		179,281	48.13	
INC hold		Swing		

=== 1952 ===
1952 Indian general election: Balaghat
Party	Candidate	Votes	%	±%
INC	Chintaman Rao Gautam	117,725	65.56	
Socialist	Sheoram Bisen	45,125	25.13	
RRP	Ramlal Bhawani	16,728	9.32	
Majority		72,600	40.43	
Turnout		179,578	48.41	
INC win (new seat)				

== See also ==
- Balaghat district
- List of constituencies of the Lok Sabha
