= Badri Lal Yadav =

Indian politician

Member of the Madhya Pradesh Legislative Assembly
- In office 2003–2008
- Preceded by: Balram Singh Gujar
- Succeeded by: Purshotam Dangi
- Constituency: Biaora
- In office 1993–1998
- Preceded by: Dattatray Rao
- Succeeded by: Balram Singh Gujar
- Constituency: Biaora

Personal details
- Political party: Bharatiya Janata Party

Badri Lal Yadav was an Indian politician from Madhya Pradesh, India. He was elected from Biaora constituency in 1993 and 2003 as a member of Bharatiya Janata Party.

== Political life ==
Yadav served as a minister of state in Gaur ministry under Babulal Gaur government.
