= Waraseoni Assembly constituency =

Constituency of the Madhya Pradesh legislative assembly in India

Coordinates: 21.77°N 80.05°E

Waraseoni
- Constituency No. 112 for the Madhya Pradesh Legislative Assembly

Constituency details
- Country: India
- Region: Central India
- State: Madhya Pradesh
- District: Balaghat
- Lok Sabha constituency: Balaghat
- Established: 1977
- Reservation: None

Member of Legislative Assembly
- 16th Madhya Pradesh Legislative Assembly
- Incumbent Vivek Vicky Patel
- Party: Indian National Congress
- Elected year: 2023
- Preceded by: Pradeep Jaiswal

Waraseoni is one of the 230 constituencies of the Madhya Pradesh Legislative Assembly, in Madhya Pradesh state in central India.

It comprises Waraseoni tehsil and parts of Khairlanji tehsil, both in Balaghat district.

== Members of the Legislative Assembly ==
Election	Name	Party
1952	Thansingh Bisen	Indian National Congress
1957	Thansingh Bisen	Indian National Congress
1962	Vipinlal Shankarlal Sao	Indian National Congress
1967	Thansingh Bisen	Indian National Congress
1972	Thansingh Bisen	Indian National Congress
1977	K. D. Deshmukh	Janata Party
1980	K. D. Deshmukh	Janata Party
1985	K. D. Deshmukh	Janata Party
1990	K. D. Deshmukh	Janata Dal
1993	Omkar Singh	Janata Dal
1998	Pradeep Jaiswal	Indian National Congress
2003	Pradeep Jaiswal	Indian National Congress
2008	Pradeep Jaiswal	Indian National Congress
2013	Yogendra Nirmal	Bharatiya Janata Party
2018	Pradeep Jaiswal	Independent
2023	Vivek Vicky Patel	Indian National Congress

== Election results ==
=== 2023 ===
2023 Madhya Pradesh Legislative Assembly election: Waraseoni
Party	Candidate	Votes	%	±%
INC	Vivek Patel	79,597	45.22	+37.63
BJP	Pradeep Amratlal Jaiswal	78,594	44.65	+9.91
BSP	Ajab Shastri	7,924	4.5	−9.28
Independent	Manoj Lilhare	5,691	3.23	
NOTA	None of the above	960	0.55	−0.46
Majority		1,003	0.57	−1.92
Turnout		176,010	86.25	+4.33
INC gain from Independent		Swing		

=== 2018 ===
2018 Madhya Pradesh Legislative Assembly election: Waraseoni
Party	Candidate	Votes	%	±%
Independent	Pradeep Amratlal Jaiswal	57,783	37.23	
BJP	Yogendra Nirmal	53,921	34.74	
BSP	Ajay Ramkumar Nagpure	21,394	13.78	
INC	Sanjay Singh Masani	11,785	7.59	
Independent	Ganiram Nagpure	2,799	1.8	
GGP	Ganesh Kumar Shriram Kumare	1,500	0.97	
NOTA	None of the above	1,560	1.01	
Majority		3,862	2.49	
Turnout		155,204	81.92	
Independent gain from BJP		Swing		

== See also ==
- Waraseoni
