= Katangi Assembly constituency =

Legislative Assembly constituency in Madhya Pradesh, India

Coordinates: 21.77°N 79.80°E

Katangi
- Constituency No. 113 for the Madhya Pradesh Legislative Assembly

Constituency details
- Country: India
- Region: Central India
- State: Madhya Pradesh
- District: Balaghat
- Lok Sabha constituency: Balaghat
- Established: 1952
- Reservation: None

Member of Legislative Assembly
- 16th Madhya Pradesh Legislative Assembly
- Incumbent Gaurav Singh Pardhi
- Party: Bharatiya Janata Party
- Elected year: 2023
- Preceded by: Tamlal Sahare

Katangi Assembly constituency is one of the 230 Vidhan Sabha (Legislative Assembly) constituencies of Madhya Pradesh state in central India.

It is part of Balaghat district. The current MLA is Gaurav Singh Pardhi of the BJP.

== Members of the Legislative Assembly ==
Election	Name	Party
1952	Motiram Odakya	Indian National Congress
1957	Ramniklal Amritlal	Indian National Congress
1962	Ramlal Ojhi	Independent politician
1967	V. Patel	Indian National Congress
1967^	D. P. Mishra	Indian National Congress
1972	Chittor Singh	Indian National Congress
1972^	Satendraprasad Mishra	Indian National Congress
1977	Lochanlal Narayan Thakre	Janata Party
1980	Lochanlal Narayan Thakre	Bharatiya Janata Party
1985	Nirmal Hirawat	Indian National Congress
1990	Lochanlal Narayan Thakre	Bharatiya Janata Party
1993	Tamlal Sahare	Indian National Congress
1998	Tamlal Sahare	Indian National Congress
2003	K. D. Deshmukh	Bharatiya Janata Party
2008	Vishveshwar Bhagat	Indian National Congress
2013	K. D. Deshmukh	Bharatiya Janata Party
2018	Tamlal Sahare	Indian National Congress
2023	Gaurav Singh Pardhi	Bharatiya Janata Party

^ bypolls

== Election results ==
=== 2023 ===
2023 Madhya Pradesh Legislative Assembly election: Katangi
Party	Candidate	Votes	%	±%
BJP	Gaurav Singh Pardhi	85,950	48.51	+10.45
INC	Bodhsingh Bhagat	64,019	36.13	−9.61
AAP	Prashant Bhau	11,029	6.22	+6.08
Independent	Keshar Bisen (Bahanjee)	7,167	4.04	
BSP	Udaysingh Pancheshwar Guruji	4,743	2.68	−3.93
NOTA	None of the above	1,027	0.58	−0.02
Majority		21,931	12.38	+4.7
Turnout		177,185	87.45	+6.54
BJP gain from INC		Swing		

=== 2018 ===
2018 Madhya Pradesh Legislative Assembly election: Katangi
Party	Candidate	Votes	%	±%
INC	Tamlal Sahare	69,967	45.74	
BJP	K. D. Deshmukh	58,217	38.06	
BSP	Ajabshastri	10,104	6.61	
Independent	Udaysingh Pancheshwar Guruji	3,297	2.16	
Independent	Bhounendra Mishrilal Daharwal	2,239	1.46	
NOTA	None of the above	913	0.6	
Majority		11,750	7.68	
Turnout		152,957	80.91	
INC gain from BJP		Swing		

== See also ==
- Katangi
