= Bodh Singh Bhagat =

Indian politician

Member of the India Parliament for Balaghat
- In office 1 September 2014 – 23 May 2019
- Preceded by: K. D. Deshmukh
- Succeeded by: Dhal Singh Bisen
- Constituency: Balaghat

Personal details
- Born: 21 May 1955 (age 71) Ghubar Gondi, Balaghat, Madhya Pradesh
- Party: Indian National Congress
- Spouse: Smt. Tejeshwri Bhagat
- Children: 2
- Education: Sagar University
- Occupation: Agriculturist
- As of 16 December, 2016

Bodhsingh Bhagat (Hindi pronunciation: [boːd̪ʱ sɪŋgʱ bʱəgət̪]) is an Indian politician of the Bharatiya Janata Party and Member of parliament in 16th Loksabha From Balaghat (Lok Sabha constituency).

He is a former member of Madhya Pradesh Legislative Assembly elected from Khairlanji constituency in Balaghat district. He is vice-president of the state unit Bharatiya Kisan Sangh.

He started his political career with being the Sarpanch of his village Ghubargondi. Bhagat broke the record and defeated a 4 time MLA and RPI Leader, minister of that time Doman Singh Nagpure.

He was in the controversy when he was at a feud with the ex Minister and MLA of Balaghat Gauri Shankar Bisen during a party program in Malanjkhand.
