= Gaur ministry =

Government of Madhya Pradesh, India (2004–2005)

- Ministry of Madhya Pradesh
- no
- Date formed: 23 August 2004
- Date dissolved: 29 November 2005

People and organisations
- Chief Minister: Babulal Gaur
- Member party: Bharatiya Janata Party

History
- Predecessor: Uma Bharti
- Successor: Shivraj Singh Chouhan

The Babulal Gaur ministry was the Council of Ministers in Madhya Pradesh headed by Babulal Gaur of the Bharatiya Janata Party. Gaur served as the 16th Chief Minister of Madhya Pradesh from 23 August 2004 to 29 November 2005. He was preceded by Uma Bharti and succeeded by Shivraj Singh Chouhan.

Here is the list of ministers in his ministry.

== Council of Ministers ==
Name	Office	Portfolio	Took office	Left office
Babulal Gaur	Chief Minister		23 August 2004	29 November 2005
Gauri Shankar Shejwar	Cabinet Minister		23 August 2004	29 November 2005
Kailash Chawla	Cabinet Minister		23 August 2004	29 November 2005
Raghavji	Cabinet Minister		23 August 2004	29 November 2005
Dhal Singh Bisen	Cabinet Minister		23 August 2004	29 November 2005
Gopal Bhargava	Cabinet Minister		23 August 2004	29 November 2005
Kailash Vijayvargiya	Cabinet Minister		23 August 2004	29 November 2005
Choudhury Chandrabhan Singh	Cabinet Minister		23 August 2004	29 November 2005
Narendra Singh Tomar	Cabinet Minister		23 August 2004	29 November 2005
Kusum Mehdele	Cabinet Minister		23 August 2004	29 November 2005
Ramakant Tiwari	Cabinet Minister		23 August 2004	29 November 2005
Om Prakash Dhurve	Cabinet Minister		23 August 2004	29 November 2005
Himmat Singh Kothari	Cabinet Minister		23 August 2004	29 November 2005
Archana Chitnis	Cabinet Minister		23 August 2004	29 November 2005
Anoop Mishra	Minister of State		23 August 2004	29 November 2005
Meena Singh	Minister of State		23 August 2004	29 November 2005
Jagdish Mubel	Minister of State		23 August 2004	29 November 2005
Badrilal Yadav	Minister of State		23 August 2004	29 November 2005
Paras Chandra Jain	Minister of State		23 August 2004	29 November 2005
Kamal Patel	Minister of State		23 August 2004	29 November 2005
Narottam Mishra	Minister of State		23 August 2004	29 November 2005
Ajay Vishnoi	Minister of State		23 August 2004	29 November 2005
Umashankar Gupta	Minister of State		23 August 2004	29 November 2005
Antar Singh Arya	Minister of State		23 August 2004	29 November 2005
Rampal Singh	Minister of State		23 August 2004	29 November 2005
Shivnarayan Jagirdar	Cabinet Minister		23 August 2004	29 November 2005
Harnam Singh Rathore	Cabinet Minister		23 August 2004	29 November 2005
Dilip Bhatere	Cabinet Minister		23 August 2004	29 November 2005

== See also ==
- Government of Madhya Pradesh
- Madhya Pradesh Legislative Assembly
