= Govindpura Assembly constituency =

Constituency of the Madhya Pradesh legislative assembly in India

Coordinates: 23.249°N 77.441°E

Govindpura
- Constituency No. 154 for the Madhya Pradesh Legislative Assembly

Constituency details
- Country: India
- Region: Central India
- State: Madhya Pradesh
- District: Bhopal
- Lok Sabha constituency: Bhopal
- Established: 1967
- Reservation: None

Member of Legislative Assembly
- 16th Madhya Pradesh Legislative Assembly
- Incumbent Krishna Gaur
- Party: Bharatiya Janata Party
- Elected year: 2023
- Preceded by: Babulal Gaur

Govindpura Assembly constituency is one of the 230 assembly constituencies of Madhya Pradesh. It comes under Bhopal district.

The seat was held by former Chief Minister Babulal Gaur for 8 terms and is a BJP bastion. His son Krishna Gaur is the current MLA.

== Members of Legislative Assembly ==
Election	Member	Party
1967	K. N. Pradhan	Indian National Congress
1972	Mohanlal Asthana	Indian National Congress
1977	Laxminarayan Sharma	Janata Party
1980	Babulal Gaur	Bharatiya Janata Party
1985	Babulal Gaur	Bharatiya Janata Party
1990	Babulal Gaur	Bharatiya Janata Party
1993	Babulal Gaur	Bharatiya Janata Party
1998	Babulal Gaur	Bharatiya Janata Party
2003	Babulal Gaur	Bharatiya Janata Party
2008	Babulal Gaur	Bharatiya Janata Party
2013	Babulal Gaur	Bharatiya Janata Party
2018	Krishna Gaur	Bharatiya Janata Party
2023	Krishna Gaur	Bharatiya Janata Party

== Election results ==
=== 2023 ===
2023 Madhya Pradesh Legislative Assembly election: Govindpura
Party	Candidate	Votes	%	±%
BJP	Krishna Gaur	173,159	68.96	+10.96
INC	Ravindra Sahu	66,491	26.48	−10.09
AAP	Sajjan Singh Parmar	3,602	1.43	+0.97
BSP	Uma Devi	2,552	1.02	−0.56
NOTA	None of the above	2,561	1.02	+0.08
Majority		106,668	42.48	+21.05
Turnout		251,118	63.79	+2.89
BJP hold		Swing		

=== 2018 ===
2018 Madhya Pradesh Legislative Assembly election: Govindpura
Party	Candidate	Votes	%	±%
BJP	Krishna Gaur	125,487	58.0	
INC	Girish Sharma	79,128	36.57	
BSP	Babulal Valmiki	3,414	1.58	
NOTA	None of the above	2,043	0.94	
Majority		46,359	21.43	
Turnout		216,345	60.9	

=== 2013 ===
2013 Madhya Pradesh Legislative Assembly election: Govindpura
Party	Candidate	Votes	%	±%
BJP	Babulal Gaur	116,586	64.34	
INC	Govind Goyal	45,942	25.35	
SS	Sanjay Saxena	8,466	4.67	
BSP	Rampal Dhosale	3,517	1.94	
Independent	Dwarka Prasad Sen	404	0.22	
NOTA	None of the Above	4,011	2.21	
Margin of victory		70,644	38.99	
Turnout		1,81,201	61.00	
BJP hold		Swing		
