= Nand Kishore =

Nand Kishor, Nand Kishore, Nanda Kishore, Nanda Kishor, Nanda Kishore, or Nandikishore may refer to:

- Krishna, the Hindu deity, son (kishore) of Nanda

== People ==
- Nand Kishore Chaudhary (born 1953), Indian social entrepreneur

=== Arts and entertainment ===
- Nanda Kishore, Indian Kannada film director and screenwriter
- Nanda Kishore Bal (1875–1928), Indian poet
- Nand Kishore Acharya (born 1945), Indian playwright, poet, and critic

=== Politics ===
- Nand Kishore Garg (born 1949), Indian social worker and MLA of Delhi from Trinagar constituency
- Nandkishore Jairaj Sharma, Member of the Madhya Pradesh Parliament in 1957
- Nand Kishore Yadav (born 1953), Indian politician, Bihar cabinet minister
- Nand Kishore Yadav (SP), Indian politician from Uttar Pradesh
- Nanda Kishor Pun (born 1966), Vice President of Nepal
- Thangjam Nandakishor Singh (died 2021), Indian politician from Manipur

=== Sports ===
- Nand Kishore (cricketer, born 1970), Indian cricketer and umpire
- Nandikishore Patel (born 1982), Indian-born Ugandan cricketer
