= Hemraj =

Hemraj is an Indian male given name and may refer to:

- Hemaraja, a creature from Indian mythology
- Hem Raj (1904–?), member of the 1st Lok Sabha (lower house of the Indian parliament) from Kangra
- Hemraj Garbarran (born 1982), Indo-Guyanese cricketer
- Hemraj Pande, 17th-century Indian Jain writer
- Hemraj Verma, Indian politician from the Bhartiya Janta party, former member of Legislative Assembly of Uttar Pradesh
- Kacharu Lal Hemraj Jain, Indian politician from Republican Party of India (Khobragade), member of the 6th Lok Sabha of India from Balaghat

== See also ==
- Sheth Gopalji Hemraj High School, Mumbai, Maharashtra, India
