= Bhopal Dakshin-Paschim Assembly constituency =

Constituency of the Madhya Pradesh legislative assembly in India

Coordinates: 23.21°N 77.43°E

Bhopal Dakshin-Pashchim
- Constituency No. 152 for the Madhya Pradesh Legislative Assembly

Constituency details
- Country: India
- Region: Central India
- State: Madhya Pradesh
- District: Bhopal
- Lok Sabha constituency: Bhopal
- Established: 2008
- Reservation: None

Member of Legislative Assembly
- 16th Madhya Pradesh Legislative Assembly
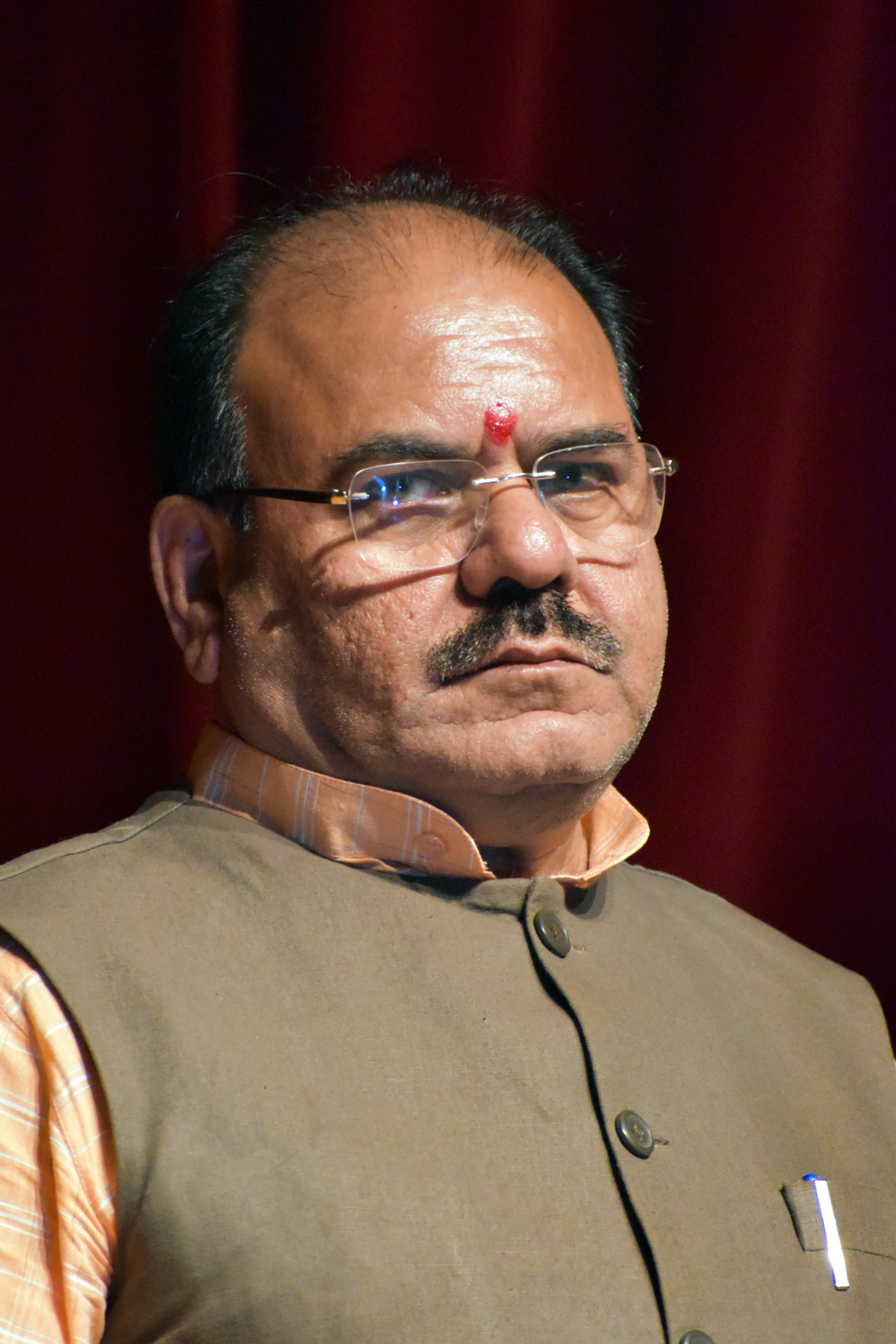
- Incumbent Bhagwandas Sabnani
- Party: Bharatiya Janata Party
- Elected year: 2023
- Preceded by: P. C. Sharma

Bhopal Dakshin-Pashchim Assembly constituency is one of the 230 constituencies of Madhya Pradesh Legislative Assembly. It is an assembly segment of Bhopal Lok Sabha constituency. Prior to 2008, it was known as Bhopal South.

== Members of the Legislative Assembly ==
Year	Name	Party
As Bhopal South
1974^	Babulal Gaur	Bharatiya Jana Sangh
1977	Babulal Gaur	Janata Party
1980	Satyanarayana Agarwal	Indian National Congress
1985	Hasnat Siddiqui	Bharatiya Janata Party
1986^	Hasnat Siddiqui	Indian National Congress
1990	Shailendra Pradhan	Bharatiya Janata Party
1993	Shailendra Pradhan	Bharatiya Janata Party
1998	P. C. Sharma	Indian National Congress
2003	Umashankar Gupta	Bharatiya Janata Party
As Bhopal South-West
2008	Umashankar Gupta	Bharatiya Janata Party
2013	Umashankar Gupta	Bharatiya Janata Party
2018	P. C. Sharma	Indian National Congress
2023	Bhagwandas Sabnani	Bharatiya Janata Party

^by poll

== Election results ==
=== 2023 ===
2023 Madhya Pradesh Legislative Assembly election: Bhopal Dakshin-Paschim
Party	Candidate	Votes	%	±%
BJP	Bhagwandas Sabnani	76,689	54.27	+10.09
INC	P. C. Sharma	60,856	43.06	−5.91
BSP	Sudhir Ubnare	1,557	1.1	−0.47
NOTA	None of the above	1,189	0.84	+0.02
Majority		15,833	11.21	+6.42
Turnout		141,314	60.6	−3.06
BJP gain from INC		Swing		

=== 2018 ===
2018 Madhya Pradesh Legislative Assembly election: Bhopal Dakshin-Paschim
Party	Candidate	Votes	%	±%
INC	P. C. Sharma	67,323	48.97	
BJP	Umashankar Gupta	60,736	44.18	
BSP	Randheer Bhojane	2,154	1.57	
Sapaks Party	Dr.Kanti Lal Sahu (Retd. Director Health)	2,152	1.57	
AAP	Alok Agarwal	1,654	1.2	
NOTA	None of the above	1,128	0.82	
Majority		6,587	4.79	
Turnout		137,472	63.66	
INC gain from BJP		Swing		
