= Ashok Vajpeyi =

Indian Hindi-language poet, essayist and literary-cultural critic (born 1941)

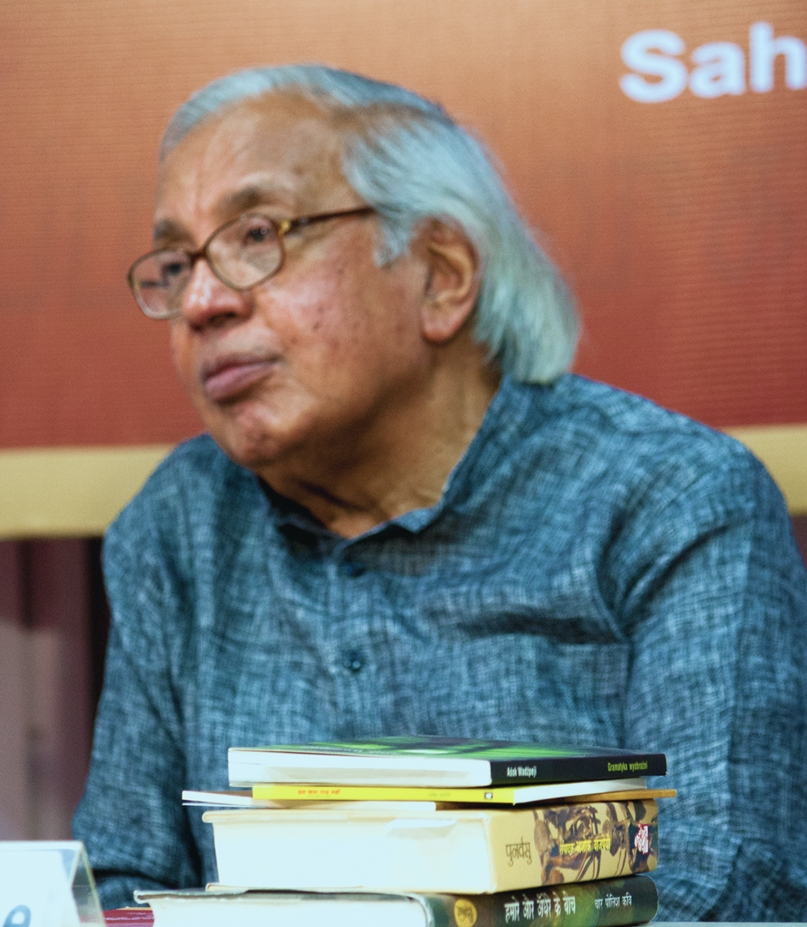
- With his books at a seminar in IGNOU
- Born: 1941 (age 84–85); Durg, Central Provinces and Berar, British India
- Occupations: Chairman, Lalit Kala Akademi India's National Academy of Arts (2008–2011), poet, essayist, literary-cultural critic
- Writing career
- Language: Hindi

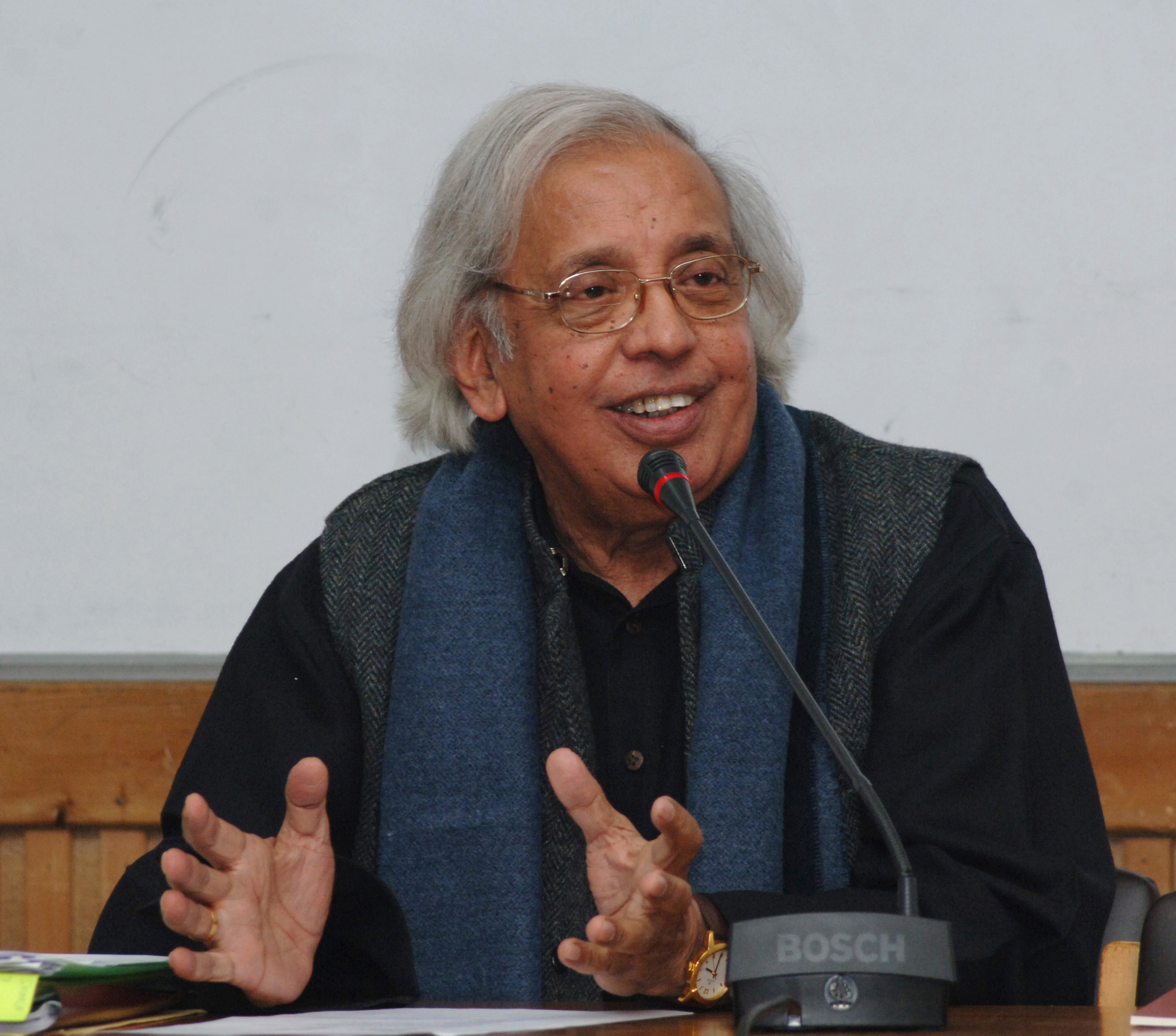
The Chairman, Lalit Kala Akademi, Shri Ashok Vajpeyi interacting with the media, in New Delhi on 15 December 2011

Ashok Vajpeyi (born 1941) is an Indian Hindi-language poet, essayist, literary-cultural critic, apart from being a noted cultural and arts administrator, and a former civil servant. He was chairman, Lalit Kala Akademi India's National Academy of Arts, Ministry of Culture, Govt of India, 2008–2011. He has published over 23 books of poetry, criticism and art, and was awarded the Sahitya Akademi Award given by Sahitya Akademi, India's National Academy of Letters, in 1994 for his poetry collection, Kahin Nahin Wahin. His notable poetry collections include, Shaher Ab Bhi Sambhavana Hai (1966), Tatpurush (1986), Bahuri Akela (1992), Ibarat Se Giri Matrayen, Ummeed ka Doosra Naam (2004) and Vivaksha (2006), besides this he has also published works on literary and art criticism: Filhal, Kuchh Poorvagrah, Samay se Bahar, Kavita ka Galp and Sidhiyan Shuru ho Gayi Hain. He is generally seen as part of the old Delhi-centric literary-cultural establishment consisting of bureaucrat-poets and academicians like Sitakanta Mahapatra, Keki Daruwalla, J.P.Das, Gopi Chand Narang, Indra Nath Choudhari and K.Satchidanandan.

== Career ==
Vajpeyi received his master's degree (MA English) from St. Stephen's College, Delhi and joined the Indian Administrative Services (IAS) in Madhya Pradesh (MP), in 1965. He was patronized by Indian National Congress leader Arjun Singh, and became the state's culture secretary when Singh became the Chief Minister of MP. As the culture secretary, he set up 11 cultural institutions, and made decisions regarding appointment of trustees and office-bearers of these institutions. This made him an influential figure within MP. In 1980s, he gained national recognition, starting with the establishment of Bharat Bhavan, which was inaugurated by prime minister Indira Gandhi. Vajpeyi lost his powerful position in MP, when Congress' rival Bharatiya Janata Party came to power in the state. In 1990, the Sunder Lal Patwa government transferred him to the state Revenue Board.

Over the years he served Secretary of Culture, Union Ministry of Culture, and as Vice-Chancellor, Mahatma Gandhi Antarrashtriya Hindi Vishwavidyalaya; trustee, Indira Gandhi National Centre for the Arts (IGNCA); member, Indian Council for Cultural Relations (ICCR), and executive board member of the Sangeet Natak Akademi. He has won the Dayavati Modi Kavi Shekhar Samman, 1994, and the Kabir Samman (2006). His work has been translated into many Indian languages, besides in English, French, and Polish. After being appointed a pro-tem Chairman of Lalit Kala Akademi India's National Academy of Arts, he was subsequently appointed as its regular chairman, in April 2008, till December 2011.

After his retirement from IAS, he has lived in Delhi.

== Protest and return of awards ==
On 7 October 2015 it was reported that Vajpeyi returned his Sahitya Akademi Award supporting "the right to dissent" and protesting recent murders of writers. On 20 January 2016, Ashok decided to return D.Litt. given to him by University of Hyderabad in protest against the "Anti-Dalit" attitude of authorities which has allegedly driven a Dalit student Rohith Vemula to commit suicide.

== Works ==
- Kahin Nahin Vahin (Hindi). Rajkamal Prakashan. ISBN 81-267-0547-7.
- Jo Nahin Hai (Hindi). Kitabghar Prakashan, 1996. ISBN 81-7016-349-8.
- Seediyan Suroo Ho Gayee Hain (Hindi). Vani Prakashan, 1996. ISBN 81-7055-498-5.
- Ek Patang Anant Mein (Hindi). Rajkamal Prakashan. ISBN 81-267-1047-0.
- Samay Ke Pass Samay (Hindi). Rajkamal Prakashan. ISBN 81-7178-972-2.
- Kavita Ka Galpa (Hindi). Rajkamal Prakashan. ISBN 81-7119-272-6.
- Dukh Chitthirasa Hai (Hindi). Rajkamal Prakashan. ISBN 978-81-267-1506-0.
- Umang (Hindi). Rajkamal Prakashan. ISBN 81-267-0979-0.
- Pao Bhar Jeera Mein Brahambhoj (Hindi). Rajkamal Prakashan. ISBN 81-267-0533-7.
- Kuch Purvgrah (Hindi). Rajkamal Prakashan. ISBN 81-267-0546-9.
- Sanshaya Ke Saaye (Hindi). Bhartiya Jnanpith. ISBN 81-263-1417-6.
- Kavita Ka Janpad (Hindi). Rajkamal Prakashan. ISBN 81-7119-116-9.
- Ujala Ek Mandir Banati Hai (Hindi). Rajpal And Sons, ISBN 81-7028-631-X.
- Avignon. Rajkamal Prakashan. ISBN 81-7178-431-3.
- Punarwasu (S.) (Hindi). Rajkamal Prakashan. ISBN 978-81-267-1454-4.
- Kuchh Rafoo Kuchh Thigare (Hindi). Rajkamal Prakashan. ISBN 81-267-0846-8.
- Vivaksha (Hindi). Rajkamal Prakashan. ISBN 81-267-1199-X.
- Anyatra (Hindi). Rajkamal Prakashan. ISBN 978-81-267-2029-3
- Kabhi Kabhar (Hindi). Vani, 2000. ISBN 81-7055-716-X.
- Bahuri Akela (Hindi). Vani, 2005.
- Ab Yahan Nahin (Hindi). Penguin, 2011. ISBN 978-0-14-310160-4.

Anthology

- Pratinidhi Kavitayen : Ashok Vajpeyi (Hindi). Rajkamal Prakashan. ISBN 978-81-7178-704-3.
- "Din firne wale hai" : Ashok Vajpeyi

As a translator, he collaborated with Renata Czekalska to translate from Polish into Hindi the works of four major Polish poets: Czesław Miłosz, W. Szymborska, Z. Herbert and T. Rozewicz.
