= Anubha Munjare =

Indian politician

Member of the Madhya Pradesh Legislative Assembly
- Incumbent
- Assumed office 3 December 2023
- Preceded by: Gaurishankar Bisen
- Constituency: Balaghat

Personal details
- Born: 20-11-1967 JABALPUR Madhya Pradesh INDIA
- Party: Indian National Congress
- Spouse: Shree Kankar Munjare
- Children: 2
- Education: Master of Arts; Rani Durgavati Vishwavidyalaya
- Occupation: Politician

Anubha Munjare (born 1967) is an Indian politician from Madhya Pradesh. She is a member of the Madhya Pradesh Legislative Assembly representing the Indian National Congress from Balaghat Assembly constituency in Balaghat district. She won the 2023 Madhya Pradesh Legislative Assembly election. She is a member and general secretary of Madhya Pradesh congress committee.

== Early life and education ==
Munjare was born in Jabalpur, Madhya Pradesh to Satyendra and Snehlata Verma. Her father was a police inspector in Madhya Pradesh police and mother was a housewife. She completed her M.A. from Rani Durgawati University, Jabalpur in 1987. Later, she did B.Ed. also from Rani Durgawati University in 1989.

== Political career ==
Anubha started her political career when she was elected as a corporator of Balaghat municipal council. Then she won the election of the president of Balaghaat municipal council as an independent candidate in 1999. She again won the election of the president as an independent candidate in 2002 and 2007 as well. the 2023 Madhya Pradesh Legislative Assembly election from Balaghat Assembly constituency defeating Gaurishankar Bisen of Bharatiya Janata Party by a margin of 29,195 votes. Earlier in the 2018 Madhya Pradesh Legislative Assembly election, she lost to Bisen.
