= Biaora Assembly constituency =

Constituency of the Madhya Pradesh legislative assembly in India

Coordinates: 23.92°N 76.91°E

Biaora
- Constituency No. 161 for the Madhya Pradesh Legislative Assembly

Constituency details
- Country: India
- Region: Central India
- State: Madhya Pradesh
- District: Rajgarh
- Lok Sabha constituency: Rajgarh
- Established: 1957
- Reservation: None

Member of Legislative Assembly
- 16th Madhya Pradesh Legislative Assembly
- Incumbent Narayan Singh Panwar
- Party: Bharatiya Janata Party
- Elected year: 2023
- Preceded by: Purshottam Dangi

Biaora Assembly constituency is one of the 230 Vidhan Sabha (Legislative Assembly) constituencies of Madhya Pradesh state in central India.

It is part of Rajgarh district.

== Members of the Legislative Assembly ==
=== Madhya Bharat Legislative Assembly ===
Election	Name	Party
1952	Madan Lal	Independent politician

=== Madhya Pradesh Legislative Assembly ===
Year	Member	Party
1957	Laxman Singh	Independent politician
1962	Ram Karan Ugra	Praja Socialist Party
1967	Jagannath	Independent politician
1972	Ram Karan Ugra	Indian National Congress
1977	Dattatray Rav Madhav Rav	Janata Party
1980	Dattatrai Madhavrav Jagtap	Bharatiya Janata Party
1985	Vijay Singh	Indian National Congress
1990	Dattatray Rav	Independent politician
1993	Badri Lal Yadav	Bharatiya Janata Party
1998	Balram Singh Gujar	Indian National Congress
2003	Badri Lal Yadav	Bharatiya Janata Party
2008	Purshottam Dangi	Indian National Congress
2013	Narayan Singh Panwar	Bharatiya Janata Party
2018	Govardhan B. Dangi	Indian National Congress
2020^	Ramchandra Dangi	Indian National Congress
2023	Narayan Singh Panwar	Bharatiya Janata Party

^ bypoll

== Election results ==
=== 2023 ===
2023 Madhya Pradesh Legislative Assembly election: Biaora
Party	Candidate	Votes	%	±%
BJP	Narayan Singh Panwar	117,846	57.61	+12.70
INC	Purshottam Dangi	81,635	39.91	−11.53
NOTA	None of the above	1,051	0.51	−0.13
Majority		36,211	17.7	+11.17
Turnout		204,564	84.78	+2.60
BJP gain from INC		Swing		

=== 2020 bypoll ===
2020 Madhya Pradesh Legislative Assembly by-elections: Biaora
Party	Candidate	Votes	%	±%
INC	Purshottam Dangi	95,397	51.44	+8.58
BJP	Narayan Singh Panwar	83,295	44.91	+2.52
BSP	Gopal Singh Bhilala	2,237	1.21	−2.00
NOTA	None of the above	1,179	0.64	−0.20
Majority		12,102	6.53	+6.06
Turnout		185,459	82.18	+1.41
INC hold		Swing		

=== 2018 ===
2018 Madhya Pradesh Legislative Assembly election: Biaora
Party	Candidate	Votes	%	±%
INC	Govardhan B. Dangi	75,569	42.86	
BJP	Narayan Singh Panwar	74,743	42.39	
Independent	Motilal Lodha (Anna Sahab)	13,238	7.51	
BSP	Gopal Singh Bhilala	5,664	3.21	
NOTA	None of the above	1,481	0.84	
Majority		826	0.47	
Turnout		176,314	80.77	
INC gain from BJP		Swing		

== See also ==
- Biaora
