= Second Patwa ministry =

- Ministry of Madhya Pradesh
- Date formed: 5 March 1990
- Date dissolved: 15 December 1992

People and organisations
- Head of state: M. A. Khan (Governor)
- Head of government: Sunder Lal Patwa (Chief Minister)
- No. of ministers: 29
- Total no. of members: 29
- Status in legislature: Legislative Assembly 220 / 320 (69%)
- Opposition leader: Shyama Charan Shukla

History
- Election: 1990
- Legislature terms: 2 years, 285 days
- Predecessor: Third Shyama Charan Shukla Ministry

The Second Sunder Lal Patwa ministry is the council of ministers in headed by Chief Minister Sunder Lal Patwa. It was formed after 1990 Madhya Pradesh Legislative Assembly election, where the BJP won 220 seats out of total 320 seats under his leadership. Sunder Lal Patwa the leader of the party in the assembly was sworn in as the Chief Minister of Madhya Pradesh on 5 March 1990. Here is the list of members of his ministry:

== Council of Ministers ==
=== Cabinet Ministers ===
| 𝗦.𝗡𝗼. | Portfolio | Minister | 𝗣𝗮𝗿𝘁𝘆 |
| 1. | Chief Minister | Sunder Lal Patwa | BJP |
| 2. | Minister of Water Resources | Sheetla Sahai | BJP |
| 3. | Minister of Finance | Ramhit Gupta | BJP |
| 4. | Minister of Power | Kailash Chandra Joshi | BJP |
| 5. | Minister of Co-operatives | Laxminarayan Sharma | BJP |
| 6. | Minister of Tribal Welfare | Baliram Kashyap | BJP |
| 7. | Minister of Urban Development; Minister of Municipal Administration; Minister of Law & Parliamentary Affairs | Babulal Gaur | BJP |
| 8. | Minister of Revenue | Laxmi Narayan Gupta | BJP |
| 9. | Minister of Panchayat and Rural Development, Housing (Rural), 20 Point Programme | Nirbhay Singh Patel | BJP |
| 10. | Minister of Education; Minister of Youth Affairs & Sports | Vikram Verma | BJP |
| 11. | Minister of Public Works Department | Himmat Kothari | BJP |
| 12. | Minister of Home Affairs; Minister of Commerce & Industry | Kailash Chawla | BJP |
| 13. | Minister of Forests | Nanki Ram Kanwar | BJP |
| 14. | Minister of Social Welfare; Minister of Woman & Child Development | Kusum Mehdele | BJP |
| 15. | Minister of Food and Civil Supplies | Balihar Singh | BJP |

=== Ministers of State ===
| 𝗦.𝗡𝗼. | Portfolio | Minister | 𝗣𝗮𝗿𝘁𝘆 |
| 16. | Minister of Transport | Sudhakar Bapat | BJP |
| 17. | Minister of Public Health Engineering | Dhyanendra Singh | BJP |
| 18. | Minister of Energy | Omkar Tiwari | BJP |
| 19. | Minister of Law & Parliamentary Affairs | Mahesh Prasad Shukla | BJP |
| 20. | Minister of Health | Rajendra Prakash Singh | BJP |
| 21. | Minister of Waqf, State Haj Committee, Masjid Committee, Urdu Academy (Independent Charge) | Mohammed Gani Ansari | BJP |
| 22. | Minister of Labour | Lilaram Bhojwani | BJP |
| 23. | Minister of Panchayat & Rural Development | Sujan Singh Patel | BJP |
| 24. | Minister of Agriculture | Kriparam Sahu | BJP |
| 25. | Minister of Water Resources; Minister of Rural Development & Panchayat Raj | Thawar Chand Gehlot | BJP |
| 26. | Minister of Scheduled Castes & Backward Classes Welfare | Haridas Bharadwaj | BJP |
| 27. | Minister of Education | Kishori Lal Verma | BJP |
| 28. | Minister of Forest | Gyan Singh | BJP |
| 29. | Minister of Tourism | Brijmohan Agrawal | BJP |
