= Phool Singh Rathiya =

Indian politician

Member of Chhattisgarh Legislative Assembly
- Incumbent
- Assumed office 2023
- Preceded by: Nanki Ram Kanwar
- Constituency: Rampur

Personal details
- Political party: Indian National Congress

Phool Singh Rathiya (born 1967) is an Indian politician from Chhattisgarh. He is an MLA from Rampur Assembly constituency, which is reserved for Scheduled Tribes community, in Korba district. He won the 2023 Chhattisgarh Legislative Assembly election, representing the Indian National Congress.

== Early life and education ==
Rathiya is from Rampur, Korba district, Chhattisgarh. His late father, Hariram Rathiya, was a farmer. He passed Class 8 in 1997, and later discontinued his studies.

== Career ==
Rathiya won from Rampur Assembly constituency, representing Indian National Congress in the 2023 Chhattisgarh Legislative Assembly election. He polled 93,647 votes and defeated his nearest rival, Nanki Ram Kanwar of Bharatiya Janata Party, by a margin of 22,849 votes. He lost the Rampur seat representing Janta Congress Chhattisgarh in the 2018 Chhattisgarh Legislative Assembly election to Nanki Ram Kanwar of the Bharatiya Janata Party, by a margin of 18,175 votes.
