= Bhagwandas Sabnani =

Indian politician

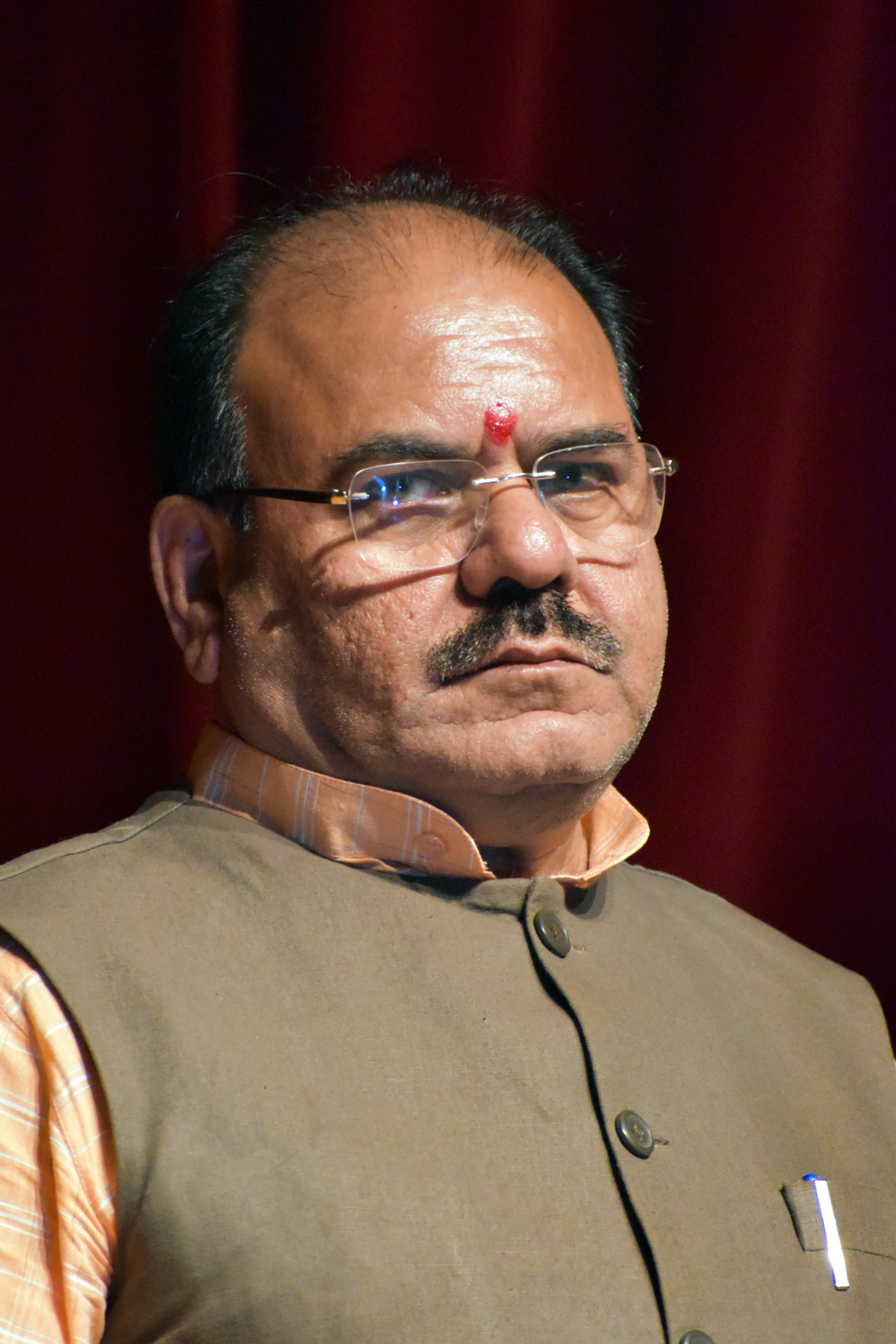

Member of the Madhya Pradesh Legislative Assembly
- Incumbent
- Assumed office 2023
- Preceded by: P. C. Sharma
- Constituency: Bhopal Dakshin-Paschim

Personal details
- Political party: Bharatiya Janata Party
- Profession: Politician

Bhagwandas Sabnani is an Indian politician from Madhya Pradesh. He is a Member of the Madhya Pradesh Legislative Assembly from 2023, representing Bhopal Dakshin-Paschim Assembly constituency as a Member of the Bharatiya Janata Party.

== See also ==
- List of chief ministers of Madhya Pradesh
- Madhya Pradesh Legislative Assembly
