= Rampur, Chhattisgarh Assembly constituency =

Legislative Assembly constituency in Chhattisgarh State, India

Coordinates: 22.37°N 82.74°E

Rampur
- Constituency No. 20 for the Chhattisgarh Legislative Assembly

Constituency details
- Country: India
- Region: Central India
- State: Chhattisgarh
- District: Korba
- Lok Sabha constituency: Korba
- Established: 1963
- Total electors: 221,232
- Reservation: ST

Member of Legislative Assembly
- 6th Chhattisgarh Legislative Assembly
- Incumbent Phool Singh Rathiya
- Party: Indian National Congress
- Elected year: 2023
- Preceded by: Nanki Ram Kanwar

Rampur is one of the 90 Legislative Assembly constituencies of Chhattisgarh state in India. It is in Korba district and is reserved for candidates belonging to the Scheduled Tribes.

== Members of Legislative Assembly ==
Year	Member	Party
Madhya Pradesh Legislative Assembly
Prior to 1963: Constituency did not exist
1967	Pyarelal Kanwar	Indian National Congress
1972	Pyarelal Kanwar	Indian National Congress
1977	Nanki Ram Kanwar	Janata Party
1980	Pyarelal Kanwar	Indian National Congress
1985	Pyarelal Kanwar	Indian National Congress
1990	Nanki Ram Kanwar	Bharatiya Janata Party
1993	Pyarelal Kanwar	Indian National Congress
1998	Nanki Ram Kanwar	Bharatiya Janata Party
Chhattisgarh Legislative Assembly
2003	Nanki Ram Kanwar	Bharatiya Janata Party
2008	Nanki Ram Kanwar	Bharatiya Janata Party
2013	Nanki Ram Kanwar	Bharatiya Janata Party
2018	Nanki Ram Kanwar	Bharatiya Janata Party
2023	Phool Singh Rathiya	Indian National Congress

== Election results ==
=== 2023 ===
Chhattisgarh Legislative Assembly Election, 2023: Rampur
Party	Candidate	Votes	%	±%
INC	Phool Singh Rathiya	93,647	53.11	+26.77
BJP	Nanki Ram Kanwar	70,788	40.14	+1.42
BSP	Jagat Ram Rathiya	2,591	1.47	New
JCC	Balmukund Rathiya	2,574	1.46	−26.44
NOTA	None of the Above	2,497	1.42	−1.32
Majority		22,859	12.97	+2.15
Turnout		176,336	79.71	−3.62
INC gain from BJP		Swing		

=== 2018 ===
Chhattisgarh Legislative Assembly Election, 2018: Rampur
Party	Candidate	Votes	%	±%
BJP	Nanki Ram Kanwar	65,048	38.72	
JCC	Phool Singh Rathiya	46,873	27.90	
INC	Shyam Lal Kanwar	44261	26.34	
NOTA	None of the Above	4609	2.74	
Majority		18,175	10.82	
Turnout		168016	83.33	
BJP hold		Swing		

== See also ==
- List of constituencies of the Chhattisgarh Legislative Assembly
- Korba district
