= Nagpure =

Nagpure is a surname. Notable people with the surname include:

- Girjashankarsingh nagpure,ex m.l.a indian politician
- Bhagwat Bhau Nagpure, Indian politician
- Doman Singh Nagpure (born 1944), Indian politician
- Mridul Nagpure, Doctor
- Keerti Nagpure, Indian actress
- Ashish G Nagpure, Indian politician
