= Balaghat Assembly constituency =

Constituency of the Madhya Pradesh legislative assembly in India

Coordinates: 21.81°N 80.19°E

Balaghat
- Constituency No. 111 for the Madhya Pradesh Legislative Assembly

Constituency details
- Country: India
- Region: Central India
- State: Madhya Pradesh
- District: Balaghat
- Lok Sabha constituency: Balaghat
- Established: 1957
- Reservation: None

Member of Legislative Assembly
- 16th Madhya Pradesh Legislative Assembly
- Incumbent Anubha Munjare
- Party: INC
- Elected year: 2023
- Preceded by: Gaurishankar Bisen

Balaghat Assembly constituency is one of the 230 Vidhan Sabha (Legislative Assembly) constituencies of Madhya Pradesh state in central India.

It is part of Balaghat District.

== Members of the Legislative Assembly ==
Year	Member	Party
1952	Kanhaiya Lal	Indian National Congress
1957	Nandkishore Jairaj Sharma	Indian National Congress
1962	Nandkishore Jairaj Sharma	Indian National Congress
1967	Nandkishore Jairaj Sharma	Indian National Congress
1972	Nandkishore Jairaj Sharma	Indian National Congress
1977	Nandkishore Jairaj Sharma	Indian National Congress
1980	Surendra Nath Khare	Indian National Congress (Indira)
1985	Gaurishankar Bisen	Bharatiya Janata Party
1990	Gaurishankar Bisen	Bharatiya Janata Party
1993	Gaurishankar Bisen	Bharatiya Janata Party
1998	Ashok Singh Sarswar	Indian National Congress
2003	Gaurishankar Bisen	Bharatiya Janata Party
2008	Gaurishankar Bisen	Bharatiya Janata Party
2013	Gaurishankar Bisen	Bharatiya Janata Party
2018	Gaurishankar Bisen	Bharatiya Janata Party
2023	Anubha Munjare	Indian National Congress

== Election results ==
=== 2023 ===
2023 Madhya Pradesh Legislative Assembly election: Balaghat
Party	Candidate	Votes	%	±%
INC	Anubha Munjare	108,770	54.83	+38.46
BJP	Gaurishankar Bisen	79,575	40.11	−1.8
Independent	Ajey Vishal Bisen	2,250	1.13	
NOTA	None of the above	534	0.27	−0.22
Majority		29,195	14.72	−1.05
Turnout		198,375	85.04	+5.34
INC gain from BJP		Swing		

=== 2018 ===
2018 Madhya Pradesh Legislative Assembly election: Balaghat
Party	Candidate	Votes	%	±%
BJP	Gaurishankar Bisen	73,476	41.91	
SP	Anubha Munjare	45,822	26.14	
INC	Vishveshwar Bhagat	28,701	16.37	
Independent	Anurag Chaturmohta (Montu Bhaiya)	17,113	9.76	
BSP	Yogesh Samrite	2,704	1.54	
NOTA	None of the above	861	0.49	
Majority		27,654	15.77	
Turnout		175,314	79.7	
BJP hold		Swing		

== See also ==
- Balaghat
