= Paraswada Assembly constituency =

Constituency of the Madhya Pradesh legislative assembly in India

Coordinates: 22.18°N 80.30°E

Paraswada
- Constituency No. 110 for the Madhya Pradesh Legislative Assembly

Constituency details
- Country: India
- Region: Central India
- State: Madhya Pradesh
- District: Balaghat
- Lok Sabha constituency: Balaghat
- Established: 1962
- Reservation: None

Member of Legislative Assembly
- 16th Madhya Pradesh Legislative Assembly
- Incumbent Madhu Bhagat
- Party: INC
- Elected year: 2023
- Preceded by: Ramkishor Kaware

Paraswada Assembly constituency is one of the 230 Vidhan Sabha (Legislative Assembly) constituencies of Madhya Pradesh state in central India.

It is part of Balaghat district.

== Members of Legislative Assembly ==
Election	Name	Party
1962	Ramniklal Amrutlal Trivedi	Indian National Congress
1967	Prataplal	Indian National Congress
1972	Tejlal Tembhre	Indian National Congress
1977	Tejlal Tembhre	Indian National Congress
1980	Tejlal Tembhre	Indian National Congress
1985	Kankar Mujare	Janata Party
1990	Uma Shankar Munjare	Krantikari Samajwadi Manch
1993	Kankar Munjare	Krantikari Samajwadi Manch
1998	Kankar Munjare	Janata Party
2003	Darboosingh Uikey	Gondwana Ganatantra Party
2008	Ramkishor Kaware	Bharatiya Janata Party
2013	Madhu Bhagat	Indian National Congress
2018	Ramkishor Kaware	Bharatiya Janata Party
2023	Madhu Bhagat	Indian National Congress

== Election results ==
=== 2023 ===
2023 Madhya Pradesh Legislative Assembly election: Paraswada
Party	Candidate	Votes	%	±%
INC	Madhu Bhagat	100,992	51.81	+23.98
BJP	Ramkishor Kaware	75,044	38.5	+4.85
GGP	Kankar Munjare	13,542	6.95	
NOTA	None of the above	2,027	1.04	−0.2
Majority		25,948	13.31	+7.68
Turnout		194,940	86.37	+3.61
INC gain from BJP		Swing		

=== 2018 ===
2018 Madhya Pradesh Legislative Assembly election: Paraswada
Party	Candidate	Votes	%	±%
BJP	Ramkishor Kaware	57,395	33.65	
SP	Kankar Munjare	47,787	28.02	
INC	Madhu Bhagat	47,476	27.83	
BSP	Mukesh Bouddh	3,886	2.28	
Independent	Shiv Jaiswal	3,207	1.88	
Sanjhi Virasat Party	Ashok Kumar Mandlekar	2,341	1.37	
NOTA	None of the above	2,110	1.24	
Majority		9,608	5.63	
Turnout		170,574	82.76	
BJP gain from INC		Swing		

=== 2013 ===
2013 Madhya Pradesh Legislative Assembly election: Paraswada
Party	Candidate	Votes	%	±%
INC	Madhu Bhagat	49,216	32.13	
BJP	Ramkishor Kaware	46367	30.27	
SP	Kankar Munjare	35897	23.43	
BSP	Durges Bisen	8468	5.53	N/A
GMS	Darbu Singh	5654	3.69	
GGP	Barelal Uikey	1572	1.03	N/A
Independent	Rooplal Kutrahe	1218	0.80	
Independent	Lokchand Harinkhede	1216	0.79	
Independent	Pt. Niranjan Sharma	1046	0.68	
NOTA	None of the Above	2543	1.66	
Majority				
Turnout		153197	82.40	
Swing to INC from BJP		Swing		
