= Pyarelal Kanwar =

Indian politician

Deputy Chief Minister of Madhya Pradesh
- In office 7 December 1993 – 29 May 1998
- Chief Minister: Digvijaya Singh

Minister of State for Finance and Tribal Welfare, Government of Madhya Pradesh
- In office 1985–1990

Deputy speaker, Madhya Pradesh Legislative Assembly
- In office 6 April 1984 – 9 March 1985
- Preceded by: Ram Kishore Shukla
- Succeeded by: Kanhaiyalal Yadav

Minister of State for Tribal Welfare, Government of Madhya Pradesh
- In office 9 April 1969 – 28 January 1972
- Chief Minister: Shyama Charan Shukla

Member of Madhya Pradesh Legislative Assembly
- In office 7 December 1993 – 1 December 1998
- Preceded by: Nanki Ram Kanwar
- Succeeded by: Nanki Ram Kanwar
- Constituency: Rampur
- In office 1980–1990
- Preceded by: Nanki Ram Kanwar
- Succeeded by: Nanki Ram Kanwar
- Constituency: Rampur
- In office 1967–1977
- Succeeded by: Nanki Ram Kanwar
- Constituency: Rampur
- In office 1962–1967
- Constituency: Barpali

Personal details
- Born: 27 June 1933 (age 92) Bhaishma, Bilaspur, Madhya Pradesh, India (now in Korba, Chhattisgarh, India)
- Died: 14 January 2011 Bhaisma, Korba, Chhattisgarh
- Party: Indian National Congress
- Spouse: Jeevan Bai
- Children: 8 (4 sons and 4 Daughters)

Pyarelal Kanwar (27 June 1933 – 14 January 2011) was a senior Congress Leader and former Deputy Chief Minister of Madhya Pradesh. He was a member of Indian National Congress and a six term MLA from Rampur Constituency of Bilaspur District (now in Korba District) of Chhattisgarh.
