= Purshottam Dangi =

Indian politician

Member of the Madhya Pradesh Legislative Assembly
- In office 2008–2013
- Preceded by: Badrilal Yadav
- Succeeded by: Narayan Singh Panwar
- Constituency: Biaora

Personal details
- Born: Padoniya
- Party: Indian National Congress
- Occupation: Politician

Purshottam Dangi is an Indian Politician, member of the Indian National Congress. In the 2008 election he was elected to the 13th Vidhan Sabha from the Biaora constituency of Madhya Pradesh. He was earlier Sarpanch for Gram Panchayat Padoniya village(1999–2008).
