= Nanki Ram Kanwar =

Indian politician

Minister of Home Affairs, Government of Chhattisgarh
- In office 2008–2013
- Chief Minister: Dr. Raman Singh
- Preceded by: Ramvichar Netam
- Succeeded by: Ram Sewak Paikra

Minister of Agriculture, Animal Husbandry, Pisciculture and Cooperation, Government of Chhattisgarh
- In office 2003–2008
- Preceded by: Prem Sai Singh
- Succeeded by: Chandra Shekhar Sahu

Minister of Manpower Planning and Technical Education, Government of Madhya Pradesh
- In office 1992–1993

Minister of Forest and Agriculture, Government of Madhya Pradesh
- In office 1990–1992

Member of Legislative Assembly for Rampur
- In office 11 December 2018 – 3 November 2023
- Preceded by: Shyam Lal Kanwar
- Succeeded by: Phool Singh Rathiya
- In office 1998–2013
- Preceded by: Pyarelal Kanwar
- Succeeded by: Shyam Lal Kanwar
- In office 1990–1993
- Preceded by: Pyarelal Kanwar
- Succeeded by: Pyarelal Kanwar
- In office 1977–1980
- Preceded by: Pyarelal Kanwar
- Succeeded by: Pyarelal Kanwar

Personal details
- Born: 21 July 1943 (age 83) Korba, Central Provinces and Berar, British India (now in Chhattisgarh, India)
- Party: Bharatiya Janata Party
- Other political affiliations: Bharatiya Jana Sangh (Before 1977)
- Education: Govt. Jamuna Prasad Verma P.G. Arts and Commerce College, Bilaspur; Pt. Ravishankar Shukla University, Raipur
- Occupation: Agriculture, Lawyer, Politician

Nanki Ram Kanwar (born 21 July 1943) is an Indian politician served as Home Minister of Government of Chhattisgarh. He is a member of Bharatiya Janta Party and was also Cabinet Minister in Sunder Lal Patwa ministry in Government of Madhya Pradesh.

He joined politics from Jan Sangh and won 1977 Assembly election on Jan Sangh ticket. He is well noted for his support of aggressive stance against the Naxalites. In 2006 he was noted for supporting the Salwa Judum. By 2010 he was known to have looked at alternate methods for fighting terrorism. He is also known for taking a strong stance against improper investigative techniques of the Chhattisgarh police. He was also in controversy for suggesting that Swami Agnivesh was supporting Maoists.

== Political career ==
Kanwar first unsuccessfully contested 1972 MP Assembly election from Rampur constituency as a candidate of Bharatiya Jana Sangh. He won 1977 Assembly election and became Parliamentary Secretary (Finance) and later Minister of state (Finance) in Janata Party Government of Madhya Pradesh. He won 1990 Assembly election and became Cabinet Minister in Sunder Lal Patwa ministry. Again, he lost 1993 Assembly election but won 1998, 2003 and 2008 consecutively. He became Cabinet Minister for Law, Agriculture, Animal Husbandry and various departments in 2003 and Home Minister in 2008 in Raman Singh's ministry.
