= Bharti Pardhi =

Indian politician

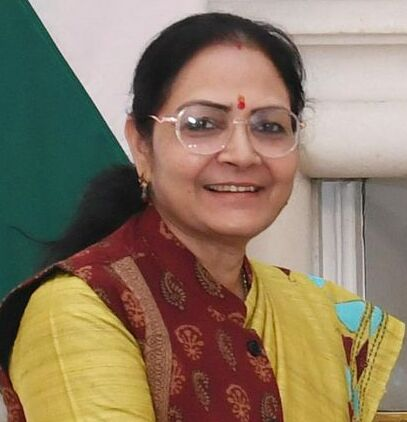
- Pardhi in 2024

Member of Parliament, Lok Sabha
- Incumbent
- Assumed office 4 June 2024
- Preceded by: Dhal Singh Bisen
- Constituency: Balaghat, Madhya Pradesh

Personal details
- Born: 23 February 1968 (age 58) Balaghat
- Party: BJP
- Spouse: Khirsagar Pardhi
- Children: 1 Son
- Parent(s): Dr. D. S. Bisen, Leela Devi Bisen

Bharti Pardhi (born 4 January 1974; Hindi pronunciation: [bʱaːɾt̪iː paːɾd̪ʱiː]) is an Indian politician. She was elected to the Lok Sabha, lower house of the Parliament of India from Balaghat, Madhya Pradesh in the 2024 Indian general election as member of the Bharatiya Janata Party.

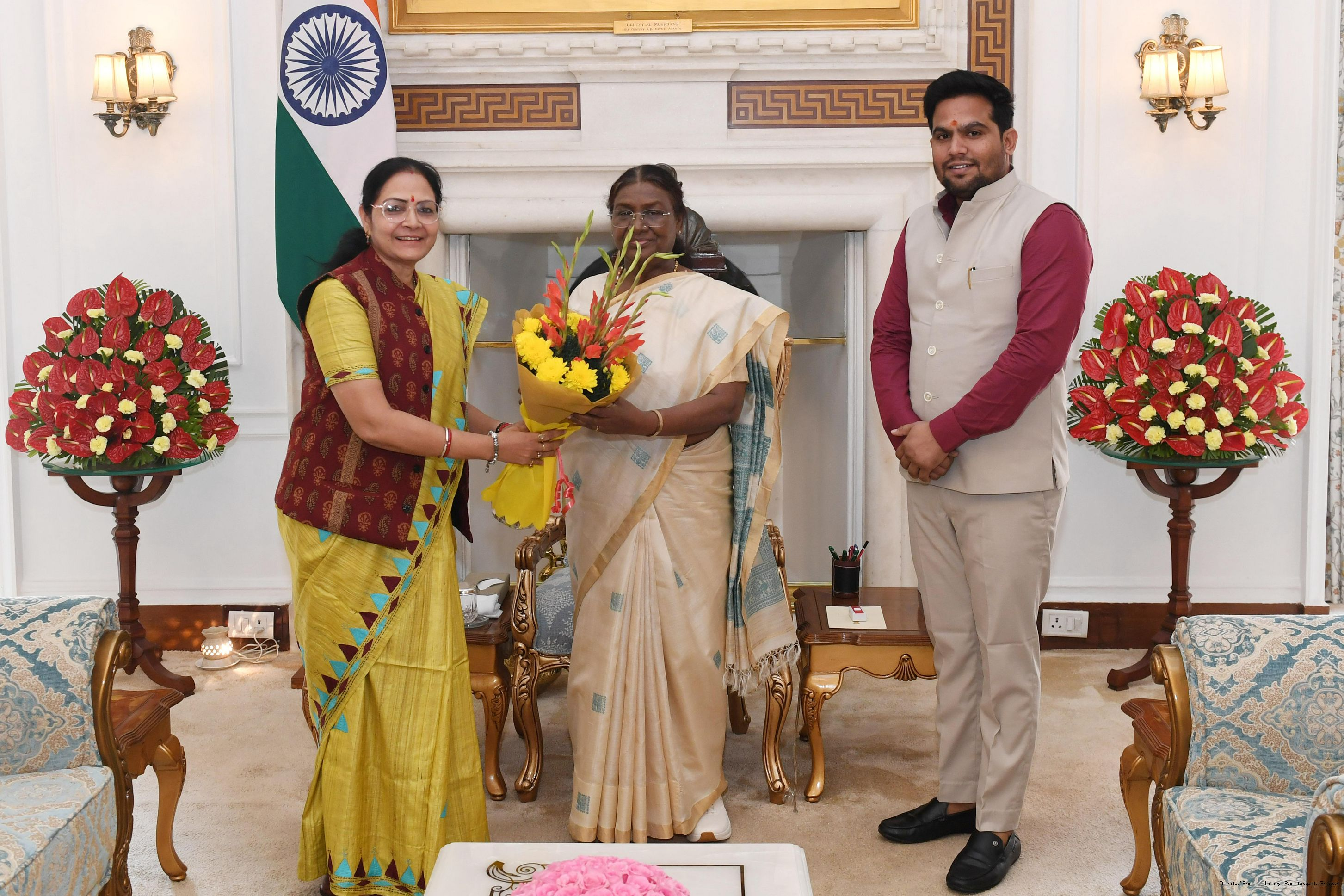
Bharti Pardhi (left), along with son Vinod Pardhi (right) meeting with the Droupadi Murmu at Rashtrapati Bhavan (2024)
