= Narayan Singh Panwar =

Indian politician

Member of the Madhya Pradesh Legislative Assembly
- In office 2013–2018
- Preceded by: Purshotam Dangi
- Constituency: Biaora
- Incumbent
- Assumed office 2023
- Preceded by: Ramchandra Dangi
- Constituency: Biaora

Personal details
- Party: Bharatiya Janata Party
- Profession: Politician

Narayan Singh Panwar is an Indian politician from Madhya Pradesh. He is a two time elected Member of the Madhya Pradesh Legislative Assembly from 2013 and 2023, representing Biaora Assembly constituency as a Member of the Bharatiya Janata Party. and currently minister of Fishermen Welfare and Fisheries Development madhya pradesh

== See also ==
- List of chief ministers of Madhya Pradesh
- Madhya Pradesh Legislative Assembly
