= Krishna Gaur =

Indian politician

Minister of State (Independent Charge)
- Incumbent
- Assumed office 25 December 2023
- Constituency: Govindpura

Member of the Madhya Pradesh Legislative Assembly
- Incumbent
- Assumed office 2018
- Preceded by: Babulal Gaur
- Constituency: Govindpura

Personal details
- Born: 1967 or 1968 (age 57–58)
- Party: Bharatiya Janta Party
- Spouse: Purushottam Gaur (died 2004)
- Relatives: Babulal Gaur (father-in-law)
- Occupation: Business
- Known for: Social work
- Website: krishnagaur.in/d/

Krishna Gaur is an Indian politician serving as a Minister of State (Independent Charge) in the Madhya Pradesh Legislative Assembly from December 2023. Elected from Govindpura constituency in the 2018 and 2023 Madhya Pradesh Legislative Assembly elections, Gaur is a member of the Bharatiya Janata Party. She defeated her nearest rival, Girish Sharma of Indian National Congress by 46,359 votes. She is the first woman ever to be elected as an MLA from Bhopal. She was also the mayor of Bhopal and the chairperson of the Madhya Pradesh State Tourism Corporation.

== Political career ==
In 2005, Gaur was appointed the chairperson of the Madhya Pradesh State Tourism Corporation. She had also served as the mayor of Bhopal.

In 2018, Gaur succeeded her father-in-law, Babulal Gaur in the Madhya Pradesh Legislative Assembly election from the Govindpura seat, which she won by defeating Indian National Congress candidate, Girish Sharma with a margin of 46,359 votes.

In 2023 Madhya Pradesh Legislative Assembly election, Gaur once again won from the Govindpura seat, defeating Ravindra Sahu of Indian National Congress by a margin of 1,06,668 votes. She took oath as a Minister of State (Independent Charge) in the cabinet of Chief Minister Mohan Yadav on 25 December 2023.

== Personal life ==
Gaur was married to Purushottam Gaur, the son of veteran politician Babulal Gaur. Purushottam Gaur died of heart attack in October 2004. She is a businesswoman and social worker residing in Swami Dayananda Nagar, Bhopal.
