= Gaurishankar Bisen =

Indian politician

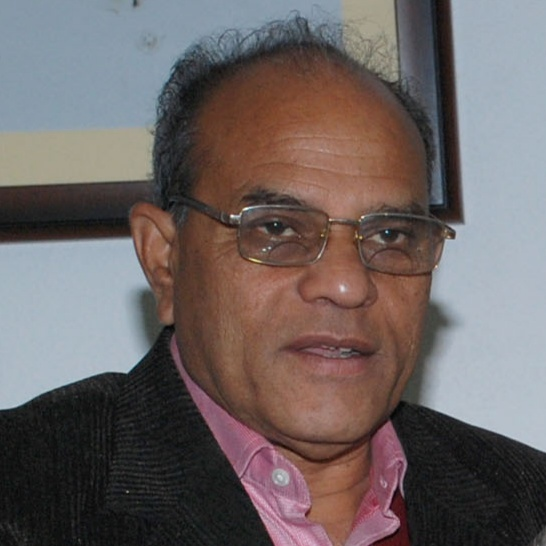

Member of the Madhya Pradesh Legislative Assembly for Balaghat
- In office 2003 – 2023
- Preceded by: Ashok Singh Sarswar
- Succeeded by: Anubha Munjare

Minister of Farmers Welfare and Agriculture Development, Government of Madhya Pradesh
- In office 2013 – December 2018
- Succeeded by: Sachin Subhash Yadav

Member of Parliament, Lok Sabha
- In office 2004 – 2009
- Succeeded by: K. D. Deshmukh
- Constituency: Balaghat

Personal details
- Born: 1 January 1952 (age 74) Balaghat, Madhya Pradesh, India
- Party: Bharatiya Janata Party
- Spouse: Rekha Gaurishankar Bisen
- Children: 2 daughters
- As of 22 July, 2019

Gaurishankar Bisen (born 1 January 1952) is a former cabinet minister in Government of Madhya Pradesh. He represents as a Member of Legislative Assembly from Balaghat constituency of Madhya Pradesh since 2008. He is a member and leader of Bharatiya Janata Party.

== Political career ==
On 10 March 1985, Bisen was elected to the 8th Vidhan Sabha from the Balaghat Legislative Constituency of Madhya Pradesh. He has been elected five times for the Madhya Pradesh Legislative Assembly. He was elected to the 13th Vidhan Sabha Balaghat Legislative Constituency of Madhya Pradesh, with a margin of over 10,000 votes on 8 December 2008. In 1998 and 2004 he was elected to the 12th and 14th Lok Sabha (Lower House) from the Balaghat Parliamentary Constituency of Madhya Pradesh. He became a cabinet minister under the Madhya Pradesh government headed by Shivraj Singh Chouhan on 20 December 2008.

== Positions held ==
Year	Position Held
1985–2003	Member, Madhya Pradesh Legislative Assembly (four terms); Chairman, Committee on Papers Laid on the Table; Member, Committee on Public Undertakings; Member, Estimates Committee; Member, Public Accounts Committee; Member, Library Committee
1991–98	Member, Committee on Public Works Department; Member, Committee on Irrigation; Member, Committee on Higher Education
1998	Elected to 12th Lok Sabha
1998–99	Member, Committee on Defence; Member, Consultative Committee, Ministry of Railways
2001–04	President, State Kissan Morcha, B.J.P.
2004	Re-elected to 14th Lok Sabha (2nd term); Member, Committee on Energy
June 2005	State Vice President, B.J.P., Madhya Pradesh; Member, Consultative Committee, Ministry of Agriculture Consumer Affairs, Food and Public Distribution
Aug 2006–present	Member, Committee on Absence of Members from the Sittings of the House
Aug 2007–present	Member, Standing Committee on Energy
