= Himmat Kothari =

Indian politician

Himmat Kothari (born 3 February 1947) is an Indian politician.

He is a leader of Bharatiya Janata Party from Madhya Pradesh, and currently serves as chairman of the state finance commission. He is a six time legislator who also served as the state home minister. He was first elected to the legislative assembly in 1977 from Ratlam city. He was re-elected in 1980, 1985, and 1990. He was sworn in as Cabinet minister in the Patwa ministry (1990-1992) and was given the portfolio of PWD department. He was re-elected in 1998 and 2003. He was sworn in as cabinet minister in Babulal Gaur ministry on 1 June 2005 and was given the department of forest and cooperative. He was sworn in as cabinet minister in the Shivraj Singh Chauhan ministry and was given the portfolio of forest and transport. He was given the department of Home and transport in 2007. He was given the best minister award in 2008. He was made the chairman of the state finance commission in 2014.

He is also the only minister who has no corruption charges against him. Even people from the opposition party admire this.

== Political career ==
- 1977 - elected to legislative assembly from Ratlam city
- 1980 - elected to legislative assembly from Ratlam city
- 1985 - elected to legislative assembly from Ratlam city
- 1990 - elected to legislative assembly from Ratlam city
- 1990 - cabinet minister (PWD department)
- 1998 - elected to legislative assembly from Ratlam city
- 2003 - elected to legislative assembly from Ratlam city
- 2005 - cabinet minister (forest & cooperative)
- 2005 - cabinet minister (forest & transport)
- 2007 - cabinet minister (home & transport)
- 2008 - best minister award
- 2014 - chairman state finance commission
