= Dhal Singh Bisen =

Governor of Uttarakhand

9th Governor of Uttarakhand
- Incumbent
- Assumed office 19 October 2026
- Preceded by: Gurmit Singh

Member of Parliament, Lok Sabha
- In office 23 May 2019 – 4 June 2024
- Preceded by: Bodh Singh Bhagat
- Succeeded by: Bharti Pardhi
- Constituency: Balaghat, Madhya Pradesh

Personal details
- Born: 14 May 1952 (age 74)
- Party: Bharatiya Janata Party
- Spouse: Bhanumati Bisen
- Education: A.V.M.S, D.H.B
- Profession: Medical Practitioner, Agriculturist, Politician

Dhal Singh Bisen (Hindi pronunciation: [ɖʱaːl sɪŋgʱ bɪseːn̪]; born 14 May 1952) is an Indian politician. He was elected to the Lok Sabha, lower house of the Parliament of India from Balaghat, Madhya Pradesh in the 2019 Indian general election as member of the Bharatiya Janata Party. Dhalsingh Bisen has been Cabinet Minister in Government of Madhya Pradesh during 2003 till 2005. He has been elected as Member of Legislative Assembly Madhya Pradesh during 1990, 1993, 1998, 2003. Served as Chairman 4th State Finance Commission, Government of Madhya Pradesh during 2011 till 2013.
