= Umashankar Gupta =

Indian politician

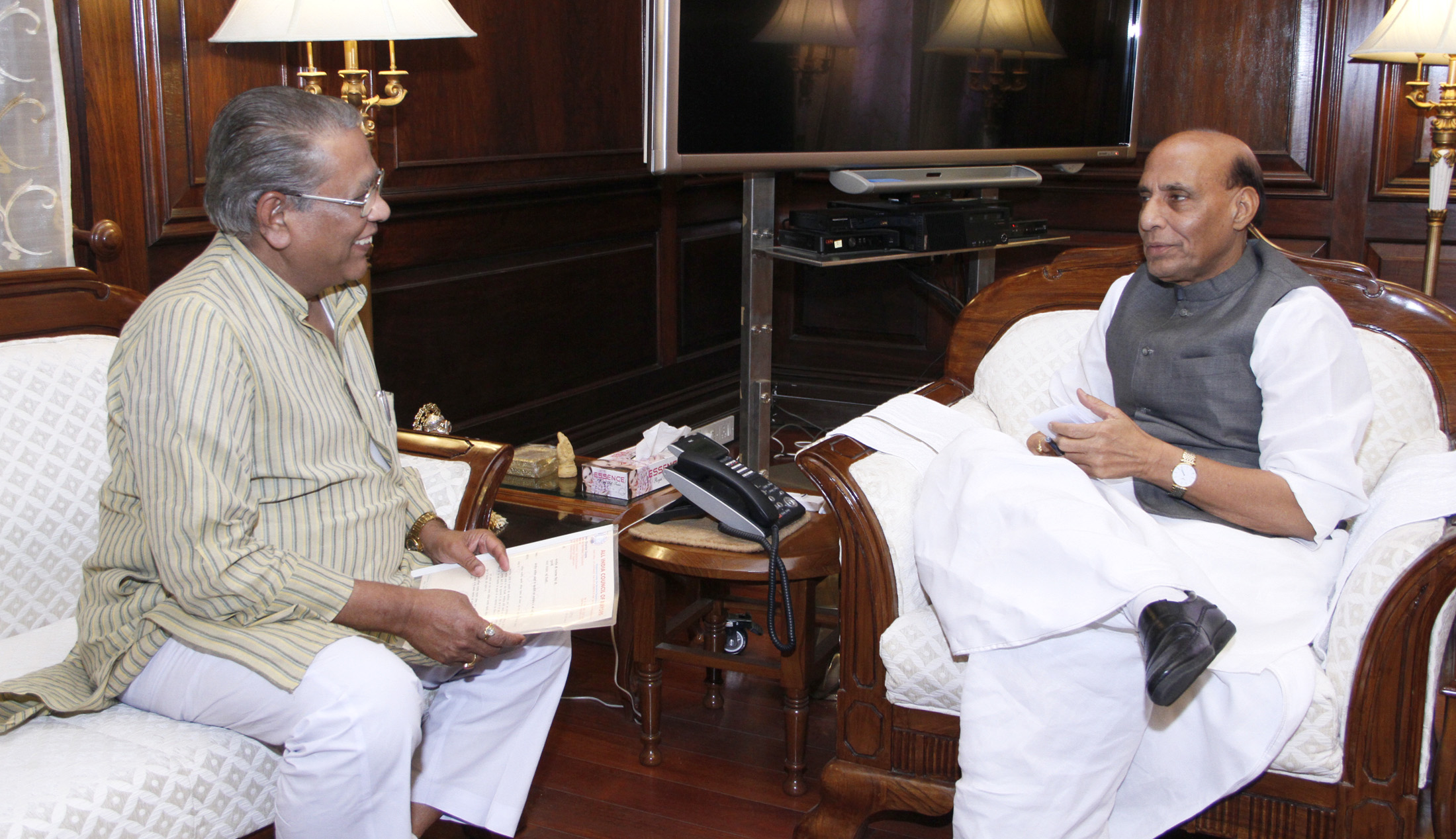
- Umashankar with Rajnath Singh at New Delhi in May 2015

Minister of Revenue, Science and Technology, Madhya Pradesh Government
- In office 2013 – December 2018
- Succeeded by: P. C. Sharma

Member of Legislative Assembly from Madhya Pradesh
- In office 2003 – December 2018
- Succeeded by: P. C. Sharma
- Constituency: Bhopal Dakshin-Paschim

Personal details
- Born: 24 June 1952 (age 73) Sagar, Madhya Pradesh, India
- Party: Bharatiya Janata Party
- Spouse: Radha Gupta
- Children: 3
- Education: M. Com.
- Profession: Social Worker, Businessman, Politician
- Source

Umashankar Gupta is an Indian politician that formerly served as Minister of Revenue and Science & Technology in the BJP-led Government of Madhya Pradesh from 2013 to 2018. He lost in the 2018 Madhya Pradesh Legislative Assembly Elections to Congress leader P. C. Sharma.
