= Jawahar Nayak =

Indian politician (born 1954)

Jawahar Nayak (born 10 January 1954) is an Indian politician and member of the Bharatiya Janata Party. He is a former member of the Madhya Pradesh Legislative Assembly from the Saria constituency from 1993 to 1998. Later, he was a candidate for the Chhattisgarh Legislative Assembly from the Kharsia constituency in Chhattisgarh.
