= Nandkishore Jairaj Sharma =

Indian politician

Member of the Madhya Pradesh Legislative Assembly
- In office 1957–1967
- Preceded by: Kanhaiyalal
- Succeeded by: N. Sharma
- Constituency: Balaghat

Nandkishore Jairaj Sharma was an Indian politician from the state of the Madhya Pradesh. He represented the Balaghat Vidhan Sabha constituency in Madhya Pradesh Legislative Assembly by winning General election of 1957.
