= Madhu Bhagat =

Indian politician

Member of the Madhya Pradesh Legislative Assembly
- In office 2013–2018
- Preceded by: Ramkishor (Nano) Kawre
- Constituency: Paraswada

Personal details
- Born: 6 October 1965 (age 60) Seoni
- Citizenship: India
- Party: Indian National Congress
- Spouse: Bhavna Bhagat
- Education: HSC
- Alma mater: Vinayak Mission University
- Profession: Politician, contractor

Madhu Bhagat is an Indian politician and a member of the Indian National Congress.

== Political career ==
He became an MLA in 2013.

== Political views ==
He supports Congress Party's ideology.

== Personal life ==
He is married to Bhavna Bhagat. In 2016, he had undergone bypass surgery after a heart attack at Shelby Hospital, Jabalpur.

== See also ==
- Madhya Pradesh Legislative Assembly
- 2013 Madhya Pradesh Legislative Assembly election
- 2008 Madhya Pradesh Legislative Assembly election
