= Kacharu Lal Hemraj Jain =

Indian politician

Kacharu Lal Hemraj Jain was a member of the 6th Lok Sabha of India. He represented the Balaghat constituency of Madhya Pradesh and is a member of the Republican Party of India (Khobragade) political party.
