= P. C. Sharma =

Indian politician

Prakash Chandra Sharma

Member of Madhya Pradesh Legislative Assembly
- In office 1998–2003
- Preceded by: Shailendra Pradhan
- Succeeded by: Umashankar Gupta
- Constituency: Bhopal South

Member of Madhya Pradesh Legislative Assembly
- In office 11 December 2018 – 2023
- Preceded by: Umashankar Gupta
- Constituency: Bhopal Dakshin-Paschim

Minister of Law and Legal Affairs, Madhya Pradesh Government
- In office 25 December 2018 – 20 March 2020
- Preceded by: Rampal Singh
- Succeeded by: Narottam Mishra

Minister of Science and Technology, Minister of Public Relation, Madhya Pradesh Government
- In office 25 December 2019 – 20 March 2020
- Preceded by: Umashankar Gupta

Personal details
- Born: 20 October 1954 (age 71) Harsud, Madhya Pradesh, India
- Party: Indian National Congress
- Spouse: Vibha Sharma
- Parent: Late Mangilal Sharma (father)
- Education: BE
- Alma mater: Maulana Azad National Institute of Technology
- Profession: Politician
- As of 20 March, 2020 Source: ["Biography" (PDF). Madhya Pradesh Vidhan Sabha Secretariat.]

Prakash Chandra Sharma is an Indian politician of Indian National Congress and current member of Madhya Pradesh's 15th Vidhan Sabha, who was Cabinet Minister of Law and Legal Affairs Department, Public Relations Department, Science and Technology Department, Department of Civil Aviation, Department Associated with the Chief Minister of Madhya Pradesh Government of Madhya Pradesh during CM Kamal Nath Government (2018–2020). He represents Bhopal Dakshin-Paschim (Vidhan Sabha constituency) in Madhya Pradesh.

== Early life and education ==
Prakash Chandra Sharma, son of Late Shri Mangilal Sharma was born at Harsud in Madhya Pradesh. Having completed his B.E. Shri Sharma entered into business and agriculture. His interests include sports, excursions, music, watching movies and public service. Sharma has traveled to Switzerland, Malaysia, Singapore, Hong Kong, Bangkok, America, England, France, Germany and Japan. He was elected MLA for the first time in 1998 from the Bhopal South Assembly constituency and became the chairman of the Special Rights Committee.

== Political career ==
P. C. Sharma started public and political life as a corporator in the Bhopal Municipal Corporation. Besides being a corporator, he has been a member and president of several committees of the corporation. Shri Sharma has been the Director of Madhya Pradesh Pollution Control Board, Madhya Pradesh corporator, Co-ordinator of Environment Forum, Patron of the Madhya Pradesh Slum Landless Labourers Federation and Chairman of the Bhopal Development Authority. He has also discharged the responsibilities as executive member of Madhya Pradesh Congress Committee, Vice President of District Congress Committee, District President of Congress Seva Dal and Vice President of Pradesh Seva Dal.

He is currently District president of Bhopal INC, Sharma was elected MLA from Bhopal South-West for the 15th Legislative Assembly in the year 2018. P.C. Sharma took oath of the minister's post in Chief Minister Shri Kamal Nath's Council of Ministers on 25 December 2018.
