= Tamlal Sahare =

Indian politician

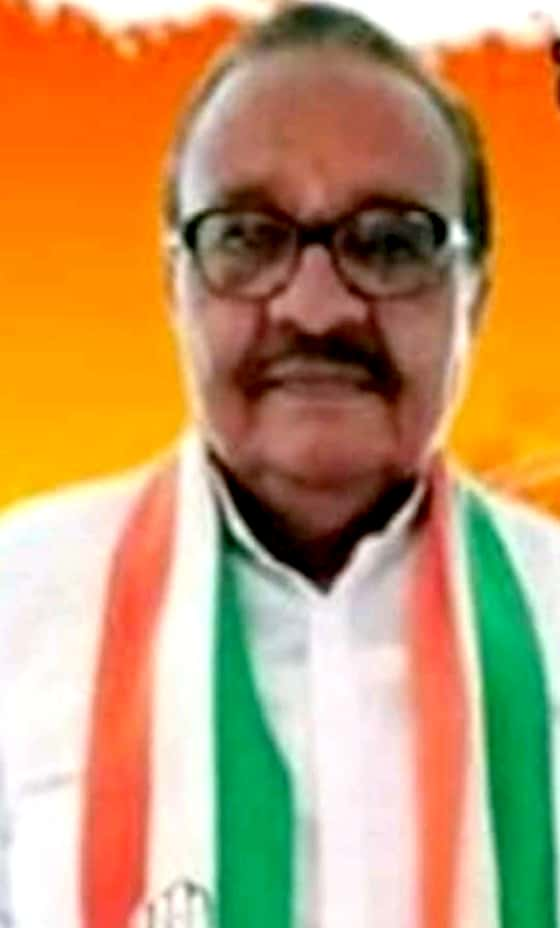

Member of the Madhya Pradesh Legislative Assembly
- Incumbent
- Assumed office 2018
- Constituency: Katangi

Tamlal Sahare is the Indian National Congress Member of Legislative Assembly for Katangi constituency in Madhya Pradesh, India.
