= Chintaman Rao Gautam =

Indian politician

Chintaman Rao Dhivruji Gautam (born 18 October 1899) was the first member of parliament from Balaghat constituency of Madhya Pradesh, India. He was a member of the 1st, 2nd, 4th and 5th Indian parliaments. He was a member of the Indian National Congress political party.

He was a lawyer by profession. On 8 November 1950 he led a successful case against the State of Madhya Pradesh in favour of bidi manufacturers and workers, challenging whether it is proper for the State to pass an act which may contravene the rights conferred by the constitution. This case is used as a text book reference among the students of law in India.

Family Hierarchy

Chintaman Rao Gautam's father's name was Dhivru Bhau Gautam. He was a farmer in Jevnara village and later moved to Balaghat city in the early 1900s. Chintaman Rao Gautam had 8 children, of which he had 2 sons and 6 daughters. The elder son, Shri Madhusudan Gautam, later became a member of the legislative assembly from Khairlanji Vidhansabha. The younger son, Shri Vinayak Rao Gautam, was an employee in the central government.

Madhusudhan Gautam had 5 children (Manoj Gautam, Sanjay Gautam, Seema Tembhre, Nikhil Gautam and Anamika Rahangdale).

Vinayak Rao Gautam had 3 children (Vishal Gautam, Preeti Bisen, Vidhya Parihar).
