= Doman Singh Nagpure =

Indian politician

Doman Singh Nagpure (born March 1, 1944, in Khairlanji, Madhya Pradesh) is an Indian politician and member of the Republican Party of India (Khobragade). He is a follower of B. R. Ambedkar. Nagpure was a member of the Madhya Pradesh Legislative Assembly from the Khairlanji constituency in Balaghat district. He was inducted into Digvijay Singh's Cabinet in 1993.
