= Rajendra Prakash Singh =

Indian politician (1945–2020)

Madhya Pradesh Legislative Assembly
- In office 1990–1998
- Preceded by: Constituency Established
- Succeeded by: Constituency Dissolved
- Constituency: Roun

Personal details
- Born: 24 July 1945
- Died: 5 February 2020 (aged 75)
- Party: Bharatiya Janata Party

Rajendra Prakash Singh (24 July 1945 – 5 February 2020) was an Indian physician and politician from Madhya Pradesh belonging to Bharatiya Janata Party. He was a legislator of the Madhya Pradesh Legislative Assembly. He was a minister of the Government of Madhya Pradesh too.

== Biography ==
Singh was elected as a legislator of the Madhya Pradesh Legislative Assembly from Roun 1990. Later, he was appointed as the health and general administration department minister in the cabinet of Sunderlal Patwa. He was also elected from Roun in 1993.

Singh died of cancer on 5 February 2020 at the age of 75.
