= Babulal Gaur =

16th Chief Minister of Madhya Pradesh, India

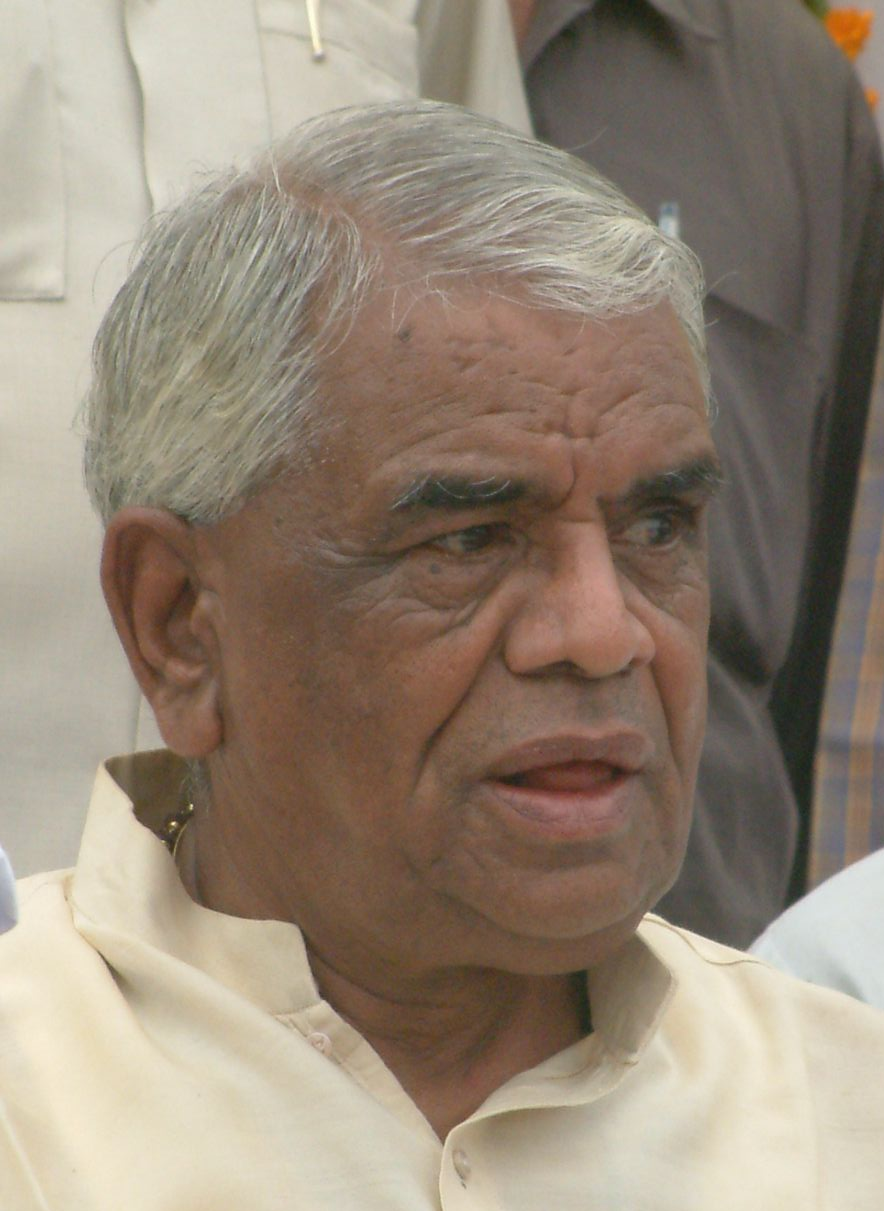

16th Chief Minister of Madhya Pradesh
- In office 23 August 2004 – 29 November 2005
- Preceded by: Uma Bharti
- Succeeded by: Shivraj Singh Chouhan

Member of Madhya Pradesh Legislative Assembly
- In office 1980 – 2018
- Preceded by: Laxminarayan Sharma
- Succeeded by: Krishna Gaur
- Constituency: Govindpura
- In office 1974 – 1980
- Preceded by: Constituency established
- Succeeded by: Satyanarayana Agarwal
- Constituency: Bhopal South

Personal details
- Born: Baburam Yadav; 2 June 1929 Naugir, United Provinces, British India (present-day Uttar Pradesh, India)
- Died: 21 August 2019 (aged 90) Bhopal, Madhya Pradesh, India
- Party: Bharatiya Janata Party (1980-2018); Janata Party (1977-1980); Bharatiya Jana Sangh (1956-1977)
- Other political affiliations: Rashtriya Swayamsevak Sangh (1946-2018)
- Spouse: Prem Devi Gaur
- Children: 3
- Relatives: Krishna Gaur (daughter-in-law)
- Education: Vikram University (BA, LLB)
- Occupation: Politician; agriculturalist
- Known for: Politics; social work

Babulal Gaur (born Baburam Yadav; 2 June 1929 – 21 August 2019) was an Indian politician from Bharatiya Janata Party (BJP) who served as the 16th Chief Minister of Madhya Pradesh. He was elected ten times to the Madhya Pradesh Legislative Assembly, twice from Bhopal South and eight times from Govindpura. He retired from electoral politics in 2018 due to old age.

Gaur was born in the village of Naugir in Pratapgarh district, Uttar Pradesh. He lived in Bhopal since his childhood. Gaur's educational qualifications were Bachelor of Arts and Bachelor of Laws. Gaur started his political career as a trade union leader. He was first elected to Vidhan Sabha in a by-election in Bhopal South constituency in year 1974 as an independent supported by Janata Party.

Gaur had participated in a number of national level movements like agitation against The Emergency, Goa liberation movement and Satyagrahas in Delhi, Punjab and other states. He was Minister for Local Administration, Law and Legislative Affairs, Parliamentary Affairs, Public Relations, Urban Welfare, Housing (Urban) & Rehabilitation and Bhopal Gas Relief and Rehabilitation from 7 March 1990 to 15 December 1992. He was Leader of Opposition in Madhya Pradesh Vidhan Sabha from 4 September 2002 to 7 December 2003.

== Early life ==
Babulal Gaur was born on 2 June 1929 at village Naugir in Pratapgarh, United Provinces of British India (now Uttar Pradesh, India) as Baburam Yadav. His father Ram Prasad Yadav worked as a wrestler. He was brought up at Bhopal. Gaur graduated with a Bachelor of Arts degree from Vikram University in Ujjain in 1958 and completed his Bachelor of Laws in 1965, that too from the Vikram University. Gaur was also an agriculturalist by profession. After he moved to Bhopal, he came to be known by the name Babulal, and he changed his name accordingly to Babulal Gaur, a name that was first used for him in school to differentiate between other pupils with the same name.

== Political career ==
=== Early politics ===
Before becoming politically active, he worked in a liquor company and then switched to Bhopal Textiles Mill. Gaur was associated with Rashtriya Swayamsevak Sangh since 1946. Gaur started his political career as a trade union leader, and participated in several movements for labour rights of the workers. He led protests after joining the Indian National Congress-backed Indian National Trade Union Congress (INTUC). He later joined the RSS-backed union Bharatiya Mazdoor Sangh (BMS) as one of its founder members. He participated in several programs organised by Sangh in Delhi, Punjab and other states. He became the Secretary of Bharatiya Jana Sangh in 1956.

He unsuccessfully contested the city council election in 1956. In 1972, he contested elections for the first time from Govindpura as a candidate from Bharatiya Jana Sangh but lost the election.

=== Member of Legislative Assembly ===
He was first elected to the Madhya Pradesh Legislative Assembly in a by-election from Bhopal South in 1974 as an independent candidate supported by Janata Party. Gaur had participated in national level movements such as agitation against Emergency, Goa liberation movement and satyagrahas in Delhi, Punjab and other states. Gaur was detained for 19 months during The Emergency under the Maintenance of Internal Security Act (MISA).

He contested from Bhopal South in 1977 as a Janata Party candidate and won the election. From 1980 onwards, he contested from Govindpura as a Bharatiya Janata Party candidate and won the seat for eight consecutive elections up to 2013. He created a record by winning Vidhan Sabha election by 59,666 votes in 1993. Gaur broke his own record by winning Vidhan Sabha election by 64,212 votes in 2003. During the tenth Vidhan Sabha 1993–98, Babulal Gaur was Chief Whip of BJP Legislature Party, Chairman of Public Accounts Committee, Member of Undertaking Committee, Privilege Committee etc.

He was Minister for Local Administration, Law and Legislative Affairs, Parliamentary Affairs, Public Relations, Urban Welfare, Housing (Urban) & Rehabilitation and Bhopal Gas Relief and Rehabilitation from 7 March 1990 to 15 December 1992. Gaur was Leader of Opposition from 4 September 2002 to 7 December 2003 in the 11th Madhya Pradesh Vidhan Sabha (1999-2003).

=== Chief Minister of Madhya Pradesh ===
The erstwhile chief minister Uma Bharti had resigned from the CM post after an arrest warrant was issued against her in the 1994 Hubli riot case by a Hubli court in Karnataka. Gaur became the Chief Minister of Madhya Pradesh from 23 August 2004 to 29 November 2005 after her. In November 2005, Shivraj Singh Chouhan succeeded Gaur as the CM.

=== Council of Ministers ===
Gaur was sworn in as Minister for Commerce, Industries, Commercial Taxes, Employment, Public Undertakings and Bhopal Gas Tragedy Relief and Rehabilitation in Shivraj Singh Chouhan's Council of Ministers on 20 December 2008.

Gaur was elected to 14th Vidhan Sabha from Govindpura constituency in year 2013. He took oath as Cabinet Minister on 21 December 2013.

== Personal life and death ==
Gaur had two daughters and a son with wife Prem Devi. Prem Devi had already died and their son Purushottam died in 2004. He did not contest the State election in 2018 due to illness. Krishna Gaur, his daughter-in-law, won Govindpura assembly seat (previously held by Gaur) in 2018 as a BJP candidate.

On 7 August 2019, Gaur was admitted in Narmada hospital in Bhopal due to various age related diseases. He died on 21 August 2019 from cardiac arrest.

== See also ==
- Shivraj Singh Chouhan Third ministry (2013–)
- Babulal Gaur ministry

Political offices
Preceded by Uma Bharati	Chief Minister of Madhya Pradesh; 23 August 2004 – 29 November 2005	Succeeded by Shivraj Singh Chauhan
