= K. D. Deshmukh =

Indian politician

K. D. Deshmukh was the Bharatiya Janata Party Member of Parliament for Balaghat, Madhya Pradesh, India.
