= 1993 Madhya Pradesh Legislative Assembly election =

Indian state election

← 1990	24 November 1993	1998 →

All 320 constituencies in the Madhya Pradesh Legislative Assembly 161 seats needed for a majority
- Registered: 40,210,405
- Turnout: 60.52%
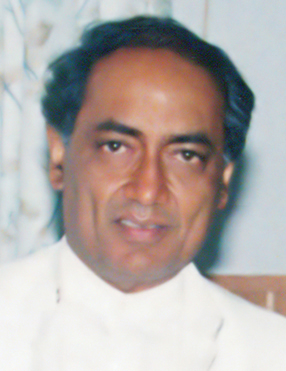
	Majority party	Minority party	Third party
		BJP	BSP
Leader	Digvijaya Singh	Sunder Lal Patwa	Kanshi Ram
Party	INC	BJP	BSP
Leader since	1993
Leader's seat	Chachoura
Last election	56	220	2
Seats won	174	119	11
Seat change	▲118	▼103	▲9
Popular vote	9,628,464	9,188,602	1,668,567
Percentage	40.67%	38.82%	7.05%
Swing	▲7.29	▼0.32%	▲3.51%
Chief Minister before election
President's rule
Elected Chief Minister
Digvijaya Singh
INC

Elections to the Madhya Pradesh Legislative Assembly were held in November 1993. The Indian National Congress won a majority of seats and Digvijaya Singh was sworn in as the new Chief Minister.

== Result ==
Party	Votes	%	Seats	
Party	Votes	%	Contested	Won
Indian National Congress	9,628,464	40.68	318	174
Bharatiya Janata Party	9,188,602	38.82	320	117
Bahujan Samaj Party	1,668,567	7.05	286	11
Janata Dal	922,580	3.90	257	4
Communist Party of India	232,081	0.98	63	2
Samajwadi Party	128,636	0.54	109	–
Doordarshi Party	100,129	0.42	271	–
Chhattisgarh Mukti Morcha	95,833	0.40	23	1
Shiv Sena	75,783	0.32	88	–
Communist Party of India (Marxist)	74,722	0.32	16	1
Krantikari Samajwadi Manch	48,799	0.21	4	1
Gondwana Ganatantra Party	42,178	0.18	15	–
Republican Party of India (Kamble)	24,816	0.10	10	1
Kisan Mozdoor Gaon Raj	8,206	0.03	31	–
Bharatiya Republican Paksha	7,233	0.03	17	–
Bahujan Kranti Dal	5,007	0.02	10	–
Indian Congress (Socialist)	4,035	0.02	7	–
Republican Party of India	3,226	0.01	8	–
Akhil Bharatiya Hindu Mahasabha	2,982	0.01	12	–
Republican Party of India (Democratic)	2,527	0.01	–	–
Bundelkhand Vikas Dal	2,174	0.01	4	–
All India Forward Bloc	2,169	0.01	3	–
Jharkhand Mukti Morcha	1,933	0.01	3	–
Indian People's Front	1,541	0.01	6	–
Lok Dal	1,267	0.01	9	–
Indian Union Muslim League	758	0.00	7	–
Shiv Sens (Rastravadi)	313	0.00	1	–
Bhartiya Krishi Udyog Sangh	243	0.00	1	–
Samajwadi Jan Shakati Morcha	117	0.00	2	–
Chhattisgarh Rajya Party	103	0.00	2	–
Akhil Bhartiya Manav Seva Dal	73	0.00	1	–
Independent	1,392,832	5.88	1814	8
Total	23,667,929	100.00	3718	320
Valid votes	23,667,929	97.28		
Invalid/blank votes	662,680	2.72		
Total votes	24,330,609	100.00		
Registered voters/turnout	40,210,405	60.51		
Source: ECI

== Elected members ==
Constituency	Reserved for	Member	Party
Sheopur	None	Rama Shankar Bhardwaj	Bharatiya Janata Party
Vijaipur	None	Ramnivas Rawat	Indian National Congress
Sabalgarh	None	Suresh Choudhari	Indian National Congress
Joura	None	Sone Ram Kushwah	Bahujan Samaj Party
Sumawali	None	Adel Singh Kanshana	Bahujan Samaj Party
Morena	None	Sovaran Singh Maval	Indian National Congress
Dimni	SC	Ramesh Kori	Indian National Congress
Ambah	SC	Bansi Lal Jatav	Bharatiya Janata Party
Gohad	SC	Chaturilal Barahadiya	Bahujan Samaj Party
Mehgaon	None	Naresh Singh Gurjar	Bahujan Samaj Party
Attair	None	Satyadev Katare	Indian National Congress
Bhind	None	Ramlakhan Singh	Bharatiya Janata Party
Roun	None	Rajendra Prakash Singh	Bharatiya Janata Party
Lahar	None	Govind Singh	Indian National Congress
Gwalior	None	Raghvir Singh Banwar Singh	Indian National Congress
Lashkar East	None	R.k. Goyal	Indian National Congress
Lashkar West	None	Bhagwan Singh Yadav	Indian National Congress
Morar	None	Ramvaran Singh	Indian National Congress
Gird	None	Balendu Shukl	Indian National Congress
Dabra	None	Jawahar Singh Rawat	Bahujan Samaj Party
Bhander	SC	Keshri Choudhary	Indian National Congress
Seondha	SC	Ram Dayal Prabahkar	Bharatiya Janata Party
Datia	None	Ghanshyam Singh	Indian National Congress
Karera	None	Kiran Singh Rawat	Indian National Congress
Pohri	None	Baijanti Verma	Independent
Shivpuri	None	Devendra Kumar Jain	Bharatiya Janata Party
Pichhore	None	K.p. Singh (kakkaju)	Indian National Congress
Kolaras	SC	Om Prakash Khatik	Bharatiya Janata Party
Guna	None	Shiv Pratap Singh	Indian National Congress
Chachaura	None	Shiv Narayan	Indian National Congress
Raghogarh	None	Laxman Singh	Indian National Congress
Shadora	SC	Gopi Lal	Bharatiya Janata Party
Ashok Nagar	None	Neelam Singh Yadav	Bharatiya Janata Party
Mungaoli	None	Anand Kumar Paliwal 'bhaiya'	Indian National Congress
Bina	None	Prabhusing Thakur	Indian National Congress
Khurai	SC	Dhamoo Rai	Bharatiya Janata Party
Banda	None	Santosh Kumar Sahu	Indian National Congress
Naryaoli	SC	Pyarelal Chowdhary	Indian National Congress
Sagar	None	Sudha Jain	Bharatiya Janata Party
Surkhi	None	Bhupendra Singh	Bharatiya Janata Party
Rehli	None	Gopal	Bharatiya Janata Party
Deori	None	Sunil Jain Motilal Jain	Indian National Congress
Niwari	None	Brijender Singh Rathor	Independent
Jatara	None	Akhand	Indian National Congress
Khargapur	SC	Ahirwar Parvat Lal	Bharatiya Janata Party
Tikamgarh	None	Bundela Yaadvender Singh	Indian National Congress
Malehra	None	Uma	Indian National Congress
Bijawar	None	Manvendra Singh	Indian National Congress
Chhatarpur	None	Shankar Pratap Singh	Indian National Congress
Maharajpur	SC	Ahirwar Ramdayal	Bharatiya Janata Party
Chandla	None	Satya Brat Chaturvedi	Indian National Congress
Nohata	None	Ratnesh Soloman	Indian National Congress
Damoh	None	Jayant Malaiya	Bharatiya Janata Party
Patharia	SC	Kaluram	Indian National Congress
Hatta	None	Vijay Singh	Bharatiya Janata Party
Panna	None	Lokendra Singh	Indian National Congress
Amanganj	SC	Funder	Indian National Congress
Pawai	None	Mukesh Nayak	Indian National Congress
Maihar	None	Mathura Prasad Patel	Indian National Congress
Nagod	None	Ram Dev Singh	Bharatiya Janata Party
Raigaon	SC	Jlugul Kishore	Bharatiya Janata Party
Chitrakoot	None	Ganesh	Bahujan Samaj Party
Satna	None	Brinjendra Pathak	Bharatiya Janata Party
Rampur Baghelan	None	Ram Lakhan Singh	Bahujan Samaj Party
Amarpatan	None	Rajendra Kumar Singh	Indian National Congress
Rewa	None	Pushraj Singh	Indian National Congress
Gurh	None	Budhasen Patel	Bahujan Samaj Party
Mangawan	None	Sriniwas Tiwari	Indian National Congress
Sirmaur	None	Ramlakhan Sharma	Communist Party of India
Teonthar	None	Ramlakhan Singh	Janata Dal
Deotalab	SC	Jai Karan Saket	Bahujan Samaj Party
Mauganj	None	I.m.p Verma	Bahujan Samaj Party
Churahat	None	Govind Prasad	Bharatiya Janata Party
Sidhi	None	Indrajit Kumar	Indian National Congress
Gopad Banas	None	Krishna Kumar Singh	Independent
Dhauhani	ST	Chhatrapati	Janata Dal
Deosar	ST	Patiraj Singh	Indian National Congress
Singrauli	SC	Banshmani Prasad	Indian National Congress
Beohari	None	Shukla Ramkishor	Indian National Congress
Umaria	None	Ajay Singh	Indian National Congress
Norozabad	ST	Gyan Singh	Bharatiya Janata Party
Jaisinghnagar	ST	Ram Prasad Singh	Indian National Congress
Kotma	ST	Rajesh Nandani Singh	Indian National Congress
Anuppur	ST	Bisahulal Singh	Indian National Congress
Sohagpur	None	Lallu Singh	Bharatiya Janata Party
Pushprajgarh	ST	Shivprasad Singh	Indian National Congress
Manendragarh	ST	Lalvijai Pratap Singh	Indian National Congress
Baikunthpur	None	Ram Chandra	Indian National Congress
Premnagar	ST	Tuleshwar Singh	Indian National Congress
Surajpur	ST	Sheopratap Singh	Bharatiya Janata Party
Pal	ST	Ram Vichar	Bharatiya Janata Party
Samri	ST	Amin Sai	Bharatiya Janata Party
Lundra	ST	Bhola Singh	Indian National Congress
Pilkha	ST	Pramsai Singh	Indian National Congress
Ambikapur	ST	Madan Gopal Singh	Indian National Congress
Sitapur	ST	Sukhdeo Ram	Indian National Congress
Bagicha	ST	Vikram Bhagat	Bharatiya Janata Party
Jashpur	ST	Ganesh Ram Bhagat	Bharatiya Janata Party
Tapkara	ST	Vishnudeo Sai	Bharatiya Janata Party
Pathalgaon	ST	Rampukar Singh	Indian National Congress
Dharamjaigarh	ST	Chanesh Ram Rathia	Indian National Congress
Lailunga	ST	Prem Singh Sidar	Bharatiya Janata Party
Raigarh	None	Krishna Kumar	Indian National Congress
Kharsia	None	Nand Kumar Patel	Indian National Congress
Saria	None	Jawahar Nayak	Indian National Congress
Sarangarh	SC	Shamsher Singh	Bharatiya Janata Party
Rampur	ST	Pyare Lal	Indian National Congress
Katghora	None	Banwarilal	Bharatiya Janata Party
Tanakhar	ST	Bodhram	Indian National Congress
Marwahi	ST	Pahelwan Singh	Indian National Congress
Kota	None	Rajendra Prasad Shukla	Indian National Congress
Lormi	None	Muniram Sahu	Bharatiya Janata Party
Mungeli	SC	Khem Singh Barmate	Bharatiya Janata Party
Jarhagaon	SC	Punnu Lal	Bharatiya Janata Party
Takhatpur	None	Manharam Lal Pandey	Bharatiya Janata Party
Bilaspur	None	B.r. Yadav	Indian National Congress
Bilha	None	Ashok Rao	Indian National Congress
Masturi	SC	Deo Charan Singh	Indian National Congress
Seepat	None	Chandra Prakash Bajpai	Indian National Congress
Akaltara	None	Chhatram Devangan	Bharatiya Janata Party
Pamgarh	None	Dauram	Bahujan Samaj Party
Champa	None	Charan Das Mahant	Indian National Congress
Sakti	None	Surendra Bahadur Singh	Indian National Congress
Malkharada	SC	Chain Singh Samle	Indian National Congress
Chandrapur	None	Nobel Kumar Verma	Indian National Congress
Raipur Town	None	Brijmohan Agarwal	Bharatiya Janata Party
Raipur Rural	None	Tarun Chaterjee	Bharatiya Janata Party
Abhanpur	None	Dhanendra Sahu	Indian National Congress
Mandir Hasod	None	Satya Narayan Sharma	Indian National Congress
Arang	SC	Gangu Ram Baghel	Bharatiya Janata Party
Dharsiwa	None	Balaram Verma	Bharatiya Janata Party
Bhatapara	None	Radheshyam Sharma	Indian National Congress
Baloda Bazar	None	Karuna Shukla	Bharatiya Janata Party
Pallari	SC	Manaram	Bharatiya Janata Party
Kasdol	None	Kanahaiya Lal Sharma	Independent
Bhatgaon	SC	Mayaram Negi	Indian National Congress
Saraipali	None	Mohanlal Choudhary	Indian National Congress
Basna	None	Mahendra Bahadur Sinh	Independent
Khallari	None	Bhekhram Sahu	Indian National Congress
Mahasamund	None	Agni Chandrakar	Indian National Congress
Rajim	None	Shyama Charan Shukla	Indian National Congress
Bindranawagarh	ST	Onkar Shah	Indian National Congress
Sihawa	ST	Madhaw Singh Dhruw	Indian National Congress
Kurud	None	Gurumukh Sinh Hora	Indian National Congress
Dhamtari	None	Keshri Mal	Indian National Congress
Bhanupratappur	ST	Deolal Dugga	Bharatiya Janata Party
Kanker	ST	Shiv Netam	Indian National Congress
Keskal	ST	Mahesh Baghel	Bharatiya Janata Party
Kondagaon	ST	Shankar Sodi	Indian National Congress
Bhanpuri	ST	Antu Ram Kashyap	Indian National Congress
Jagdalpur	ST	Jhitruram Bahel	Indian National Congress
Keslur	ST	Manuram Kachchh	Indian National Congress
Chitrakote	ST	Dhaniram Pujari	Bharatiya Janata Party
Dantewada	ST	Nandaram Sori	Communist Party of India
Konta	ST	Manish Kunjam	Communist Party of India
Bijapur	ST	Rajaram Todem	Bharatiya Janata Party
Narayanpur	ST	Vikramsingh Usendi	Bharatiya Janata Party
Maro	SC	Derhu Prasad Dhritlahare	Indian National Congress
Bemetara	None	Chetan Singh Verma	Indian National Congress
Saja	None	Ravindra Chobey	Indian National Congress
Dhamdha	None	Jogeshwar Sahu	Indian National Congress
Durg	None	Arun Vora	Indian National Congress
Bhilai	None	Premprakash Pandey	Bharatiya Janata Party
Patan	None	Bhupesh Baghel	Indian National Congress
Gunderdehi	None	Tarachand	Bharatiya Janata Party
Khertha	None	Pyare Lal Belchandan	Indian National Congress
Balod	None	Jalam Singh Patel	Indian National Congress
Dondi Lohara	ST	Janaklal Thakur	Chhattisgarh Mukti Morcha
Chowki	ST	Goverdhan Netam	Indian National Congress
Khujji	None	Rajinder Pal Singh Bhatia	Bharatiya Janata Party
Dongargaon	None	Geeta Devi Singh	Indian National Congress
Rajanandgaon	None	Udai Mudliar	Indian National Congress
Dongargarh	SC	Danesh Patila	Indian National Congress
Khairagarh	None	Rashmi Devi Ravindra Bahadur	Indian National Congress
Birendranagar	None	Siyaram Sahu	Bharatiya Janata Party
Kawardha	None	Raman Singh	Bharatiya Janata Party
Baihar	ST	Ganpat Singh Uikay	Indian National Congress
Lanji	None	Dilip Bhatere	Bharatiya Janata Party
Kirnapur	None	Likhiram Kaware	Indian National Congress
Waraseoni	None	Omkar Singh Jaipal Singh	Janata Dal
Khairlanjee	None	Domansingh Nagpure Alies Baba Patel	Republican Party of India
Katangi	None	Tamalal Raghuji Sahare	Indian National Congress
Balaghat	None	Gauri Shankar Chaturbhuj Bisen	Bharatiya Janata Party
Paraswada	None	Kankar Munjare	Krantikari Samajwadi Manch
Nainpur	ST	Deenu Lal Taram	Indian National Congress
Mandla	ST	Chhote Lal Uikey	Indian National Congress
Bichhia	ST	Jhallu Lal Takam	Bharatiya Janata Party
Bajag	ST	Basori Singh Masram	Indian National Congress
Dindori	ST	Nanhe Singh	Indian National Congress
Shahpura	ST	Ganga Bai Urati	Indian National Congress
Niwas	ST	Dayal Singh Tumrachi	Indian National Congress
Bargi	ST	Nanhelal Dhurvey	Indian National Congress
Panagar	ST	Moti Lal Kashyap	Bharatiya Janata Party
Jabalpur Cantonment	None	Ishwardas Rohani	Bharatiya Janata Party
Jabalpur East	SC	Anchal Sonker	Bharatiya Janata Party
Jabalpur Central	None	Omkar Prasad Tiwari	Bharatiya Janata Party
Jabalpur West	None	Jaishree Banarjee	Bharatiya Janata Party
Patan	None	Ramnaresh Tripathy	Bharatiya Janata Party
Majholi	None	Ram Kumar Patel	Indian National Congress
Sihora	None	Prabhat Kumar Pandey	Bharatiya Janata Party
Bahotiband	None	Vishnu Datt Pouranik	Indian National Congress
Murwara	None	Sukerti Jain	Bharatiya Janata Party
Badwara	None	Bachchan Nayak	Janata Dal
Vijairaghogarh	None	Satyendra Phatak	Indian National Congress
Gadarwara	None	Dindayal Dhimole	Indian National Congress
Bohani	None	Chandar Bhan Singh	Indian National Congress
Narsinghpur	None	Ajay Mushran	Indian National Congress
Gotegaon	SC	Narmada Prasad	Indian National Congress
Lakhanadon	ST	Randhir Singh	Indian National Congress
Ghansor	ST	Uramila Singh	Indian National Congress
Keolari	None	Harvans Singh	Indian National Congress
Barghat	None	Dhal Singh Bisen	Bharatiya Janata Party
Jamai	ST	Tejilal Saryam	Indian National Congress
Chhindwara	None	Deepak Saxena	Indian National Congress
Parasia	SC	Harinarayan Dehariya	Indian National Congress
Damua	ST	Parasram Dhruve	Indian National Congress
Amarwara	ST	Premnarayan Thakur	Indian National Congress
Chaurai	None	Choudhary Mersingh	Indian National Congress
Sausar	None	Vithal Rao Nathuji Mahale	Indian National Congress
Pandhurna	None	Chander Shekhar Sanbartod	Indian National Congress
Piparia	None	Suresh Rai	Indian National Congress
Hoshangabad	None	Ambika Shukla	Indian National Congress
Itarsi	None	Sita Saran Sharma	Bharatiya Janata Party
Seoni-malwa	None	Hajarilal Raghuwanshi	Indian National Congress
Timarni	SC	Manoharlal Hajarilal	Bharatiya Janata Party
Harda	None	Kamal Patel	Bharatiya Janata Party
Multai	None	P.r. Bodkhe	Independent
Masod	None	Ramji Mahajan	Indian National Congress
Bhainsdehi	ST	Ganjan Singh Suratsingh Kumre	Indian National Congress
Betul	None	Ashok Sable	Indian National Congress
Ghora Dongri	ST	Pratap Singh Mokham Singh	Indian National Congress
Amla	SC	Gurubax Raoji Atulker	Indian National Congress
Budhni	None	Raj Kumar Patel	Indian National Congress
Ichhawar	None	Karan Singh Verma	Bharatiya Janata Party
Ashta	SC	Ranjit Singh Gunwan	Bharatiya Janata Party
Sehore	None	Ramesh Sexena	Independent
Govindpura	None	Babulal Gaur	Bharatiya Janata Party
Bhopal South	None	Shelender Pradhan	Bharatiya Janata Party
Bhopal North	None	Ramesh Sharma Gattu Bhaiya	Bharatiya Janata Party
Berasia	None	Laxmi Narayan	Bharatiya Janata Party
Sanchi	SC	Gourishanker Shejwar	Bharatiya Janata Party
Udaipura	None	Rampal Singh	Bharatiya Janata Party
Bareli	None	Jaswant Singh	Indian National Congress
Bhojpur	None	Sunderlal Patwa	Bharatiya Janata Party
Kurwai	SC	Chironjilal Sonkar	Bharatiya Janata Party
Basoda	None	Ramnarayan Munnilal	Indian National Congress
Vidisha	None	Thakur Mohar Singh	Bharatiya Janata Party
Shamshabad	None	Pram Narayan Sharma	Bharatiya Janata Party
Sironj	None	Laxmi Kant Sharma	Bharatiya Janata Party
Biaora	None	Badrilal	Bharatiya Janata Party
Narsingarh	None	Mangilal Bandari	Indian National Congress
Sarangpur	SC	Amar Singh	Bharatiya Janata Party
Rajgarh	None	Raghunandan Sharma	Bharatiya Janata Party
Khilchipur	None	Ramprasad Dangi	Indian National Congress
Seoni	None	Mahesh Prasad Manbodh Prasad Shukla	Bharatiya Janata Party
Shujalpur	None	Nemichand Jain	Bharatiya Janata Party
Gulana	None	Giriraj Mandalai	Bharatiya Janata Party
Shajapur	None	Karada Hukum Singh	Indian National Congress
Agar	SC	Gopal Parmar	Bharatiya Janata Party
Susner	None	Balabh Amabavatiya	Indian National Congress
Tarana	SC	Madhav Prasad Shastri	Bharatiya Janata Party
Mahidpur	None	Babulal Jain	Bharatiya Janata Party
Khachrod	None	Dileep Singh Gurjar	Indian National Congress
Badnagar	None	Surender Singh Sisodiya	Indian National Congress
Ghatiya	SC	Rameshwar Akhand	Bharatiya Janata Party
Ujjain North	None	Paras Jain	Bharatiya Janata Party
Ujjain South	None	Shiva Kotwani	Bharatiya Janata Party
Depalpur	None	Narbhay Singh Patel	Bharatiya Janata Party
Mhow	None	Bherulal Patidar	Bharatiya Janata Party
Indore-i	None	Lalchand Murlidhar Mittal	Bharatiya Janata Party
Indore-ii	None	Kailash Vijayvargiya	Bharatiya Janata Party
Indore-iii	None	Gopal Krishan Nema	Bharatiya Janata Party
Indore-iv	None	Laxman Singh Gaud	Bharatiya Janata Party
Indore-v	None	Bhanwar Singh Shekhawat	Bharatiya Janata Party
Sawer	SC	Prakash Sonkar	Bharatiya Janata Party
Dewas	None	Yuvraj Tukojirao Pawar	Bharatiya Janata Party
Sonkatch	SC	Surender Verma	Bharatiya Janata Party
Hatpipliya	None	Rajendrasingh Baghel	Indian National Congress
Bagli	None	Kailash Joshi	Bharatiya Janata Party
Khategaon	None	Kailash (pappu) Ramchander Kundal	Indian National Congress
Harsud	ST	Kunwar Vijay Shah	Bharatiya Janata Party
Nimarkhedi	None	Raghuraj Singh	Bharatiya Janata Party
Pandhana	SC	Kishorilal Verma	Bharatiya Janata Party
Khandwa	None	Puranmal Sharma	Bharatiya Janata Party
Nepanagar	None	Tawantsingh Harnamsingh Keer	Indian National Congress
Shahpur	None	Nand Kumar Singh	Bharatiya Janata Party
Burhanpur	None	Mahant Swami Umesh Muni Guru Swami Sant Ram Ji	Independent
Bhikangaon	ST	Jawan Singh	Indian National Congress
Barwaha	None	Tarachand Shivaji Patel	Indian National Congress
Maheshwar	SC	Vijaylaxmi Sadho	Indian National Congress
Kasrawad	None	Subhash Yadav	Indian National Congress
Khargone	None	Parasram Baboolal Dandir	Indian National Congress
Dhulkot	ST	Chidabhai Davar	Indian National Congress
Sendhwa	ST	Gyarsilal Ravat	Indian National Congress
Anjad	ST	Mangilal Adivasi	Indian National Congress
Rajpur	ST	Balaram Bacchan	Indian National Congress
Barwani	ST	Prem Singh	Bharatiya Janata Party
Manawar	ST	Dario Singh Solanki	Indian National Congress
Dharampuri	ST	Pratapsingh Baghel	Indian National Congress
Dhar	None	Vikram Verma	Bharatiya Janata Party
Badnawar	None	Rameshchandrasingh Rathore (gattubana)	Bharatiya Janata Party
Sardarpur	ST	Ganpatsingh Patel Gadbori	Indian National Congress
Kukshi	ST	Jamuna Devi	Indian National Congress
Alirajpur	ST	Mangansingh Patel	Indian National Congress
Jobat	ST	Ajmersingh	Indian National Congress
Jhabua	ST	Bapulsingh Damar	Indian National Congress
Petlawad	ST	Nirmala Bhuriya	Indian National Congress
Thandla	ST	Kantilal Bhuria	Indian National Congress
Ratlam Town	None	Shiv Kumar Jhalani	Indian National Congress
Ratlam Rural	None	Motilal Dave	Indian National Congress
Sailana	ST	Lahling Devra	Indian National Congress
Jaora	None	Mohinder Singh Mohan Singh Kalukheda	Indian National Congress
Alot	SC	Thawar Chand Gehlot	Bharatiya Janata Party
Manasa	None	Narendra Bhanwarilal Nahta	Indian National Congress
Garoth	None	Subhashkumar Sojatiya	Indian National Congress
Suwasara	SC	Jagdish Devda	Bharatiya Janata Party
Sitamau	None	Nanalal Patidar	Bharatiya Janata Party
Mandsaur	None	Kailash Chawala	Bharatiya Janata Party
Neemuch	None	Khuman Singh Shivaji	Bharatiya Janata Party
Jawad	None	Ghanshiyam Patidar	Indian National Congress
