= Rahatgaon =

- town
- Location in Madhya Pradesh, India
- Coordinates: 22°14′44″N 77°13′57″E
- Country: India
- State: Madhya Pradesh

Government
  - Type: Gram Panchayat
  - Body: Gram Panchayat

Population
  - Total: 15,500

Languages
  - Official: Hindi
- Time zone: UTC+5:30 (IST)
- Postal code: 461251
- Vehicle registration: MP47

Rahatgaon is a small town in Harda District, Madhya Pradesh. It lies about 22 km south of Harda and about 50 km east of Harsud. Bhopal is 178 km away from Rahatgaon. Timarni, Nemawar, Khirkiya and Kesla constitute interesting excursions. Harda Railway Station serves the town. Holy Narmada river is about 40 km from the city.

Rahatgaon is situated on the Satpura Range. Rahatgaon is the headquarters of the Forest division.

In the south hill region of Rahatgaon we can find the Tribal, 'Gond' and 'Korku' people. Previously in the south region there was 'Makdai' rule and the 'Gond' king was the ruler. The 'Bihola' village was the developed 'Rajaswa' center in 'Mugal'.

== Cities nearby ==
Timarni, Harda, Khirkiya, Sirali, Hoshangabad, Itarsi, Khandwa, Khategaon

== River ==
Ajnal(Rainy Season)

== Temple ==
Sakti Mata Mandir, Ganesh Mandir, Khedapati Mata Mandir, Ramjanki Mandir Gandhi Chowk, Bhairu Baba Mandir Gandhi Chowk,

== Closest airports ==
Indore, Bhopal

== Transport ==
Rahatgaon can be reach easily from timarni via sodalpur by bus . The nearest railway stations are timarni 15 km & harda 30 km respectively..

== Culture ==
All festivals all celebrated with equal fervor. Diwali is celebrated with equal pomp and glory as Eid. People still visit each other's houses and greet each other on various occasions. Gifts and sweets are exchanged and donations made to the poor. Diwali is celebrated by performing puja of the wealth goddess Lakshmi. Later in the night, fire-crackers are burst in the open by young and old with equal enthusiasm. Eid is special to the city as all the Hindus take time out to visit their Muslim friends and greet them and get treated with delicacies, the specialty of the day being sweet sewai. This culture is such that both Hindus and Muslims visit each other on their respective festivals to greet and exchange sweets. During Ganesh puja and Navratras, idols of Lord Ganesh and Goddess Durga are established in jhankis throughout the city. Rajwada Chouk's deviji Aarti and jhankis are very famous. People throng to offer prayers to their deities. At the end of Navratras, on the day of Vijayadashmi, or Dusshehra, huge effigies of Ravan are burnt in different parts of the city. There is so many "Ramayan Mandals" in Rahatgaon but the Rajwada chouk's is very famous among them. It is read along with music with instruments like Jhanjh and Dholak.

== Population ==
Approx 15,000
