= Sirali =

Town in Madhya Pradesh, India

- urban
- Location in Madhya Pradesh, India
- Coordinates: 22°9′7″N 77°3′42″E
- Country: India
- State: Madhya Pradesh
- District: Harda

Government
  - Type: Nagar parishad
  - Body: Nagar parishad

Population (2011)
  - Total: 15,507

Languages
  - Official: Hindi
- Time zone: UTC+5:30 (IST)
- PIN: 461335
- Telephone code: 07571
- Vehicle registration: MP 47
- Nearest city: Harda, Khirkiya

Sirali is a town in the Harda district, Madhya Pradesh, India. The town has an estimated population of 15,507 people, and life revolves around the Machak River and Ghonghai River, the life line of the town. Sirali is well connected with the district by road. The nearest Railway station is Harda and Khirkiya, 30 km distant. Sirali is the major town surrounded with 50 villages. This was coming under the Gond King's Kingdom, well known as Makrai state. Sirali town is well developed in the last few years with Nationaized banks (State Bank of India, Bank of India, Central Bank of India), and Internet. In Education, Sirali has schools till higher secondary. Two colleges are also here, one is Pvt. Satpura Valley College and the other one is Govt arts and commerce college. It has also the police station which is situated near shiv temple. Timber depot from M.P. Forest department. Weekly Hat Bajar (Sunday) is also organised here. Diwali, Holi, Rakshabandhan, Eid are the major festivals celebrated here.

Among its attractions is the Shri Tilbhandeshwar (Shivaji) Mandir temple. Sri Radha-Krishan is also in Sirali.

In about 2010 Sri SAI Baba Temple was also built which is very much famous in Harda district. Also many pilgrims are coming from afar to visit this temple.

Piplya, a well known village is situated 10 km from Sirali. Jinwanya, another nearby village located approximately 5 km from Sirali, has a population of 2,784 according to the Census of India 2011. The nearest hill station to Sirali is Makrai. There are hourly buses to Harda, Hoshangabad, Khirkiya, Khandwa, Bhopal and Indore.

== Climate ==
The average temperature is a maximum 43 °C in summer and minimum 10 °C in winter.
