= Kamal Patel (politician) =

Indian politician (born 1961)

Cabinet Minister Government of Madhya Pradesh
- In office 21 April 2020 – 2023
- Chief Minister: Shivraj Singh Chouhan
- Ministry and Departments: Farmers welfare and agriculture development
- Preceded by: Sachin Yadav

Member of the Madhya Pradesh Legislative Assembly
- In office December 2018 – 2023
- Succeeded by: Ram Kishore Dogne
- Constituency: Harda
- In office 1993–2013
- Preceded by: Badri Narain Agarwal
- Succeeded by: Ram Kishore Dogne
- Constituency: Harda

Personal details
- Born: 6 October 1961 (age 64) Harda, Madhya Pradesh, India
- Party: Bharatiya Janata Party
- Spouse: Rekha Patel
- Parents: Harnath Dudi (father); Parvati Dudi (mother)
- Education: Devi Ahilya Vishwavidyalaya, Indore

Kamal Patel (born 6 October 1961) is an Indian politician and a member of the Bharatiya Janata Party. He has served as a minister three times in Government of Madhya Pradesh and Member of the Madhya Pradesh Legislative Assembly five times in 1993, 1998, 2003, 2008, and 2018 representing the Harda Constituency). Agriculture in the Government of Madhya Pradesh.

== Political career ==
Patel has been associated with Akhil Bhartiya Vidyarthi Parishad, a student union affiliated with the BJP since his days as a student. He was president of Bharatiya Janata Yuva Morcha Hoshangabad. Later, he was made state general secretary of BJP Yuva Morcha then also became state president of BJP Yuva morcha.

He has been elected on five occasions as a Member of the Legislative Assembly of Madhya Pradesh from Harda constituency. Those successes came in the consecutive elections of 1993, 1998, 2003, 2008, 2018.

- 1989 – member of Madhya Pradesh BJP state executive committee.
- 1993 – elected MLA from Harda constituency.
- 1998 – elected MLA from Harda constituency.
- 2003 – elected MLA from Harda constituency.
- 2005 – state minister (independent charge) of Medical Education, Technical Education and Training with effect from 1 June 2005
- 2008 – elected MLA from Harda constituency.
- 2009 – Cabinet Minister and given the charge of Revenue, Religious Trust and Endowment, and Rehabilitation Departments
- 2013 - Lost VidhanSabha Election
- 2018 – elected MLA from Harda constituency.

== Minister Of Madhya Pradesh ==
Patel was made state minister (independent charge) of Medical Education, Technical Education and Training with effect from 1 June 2005 in the Babulal Gaur-led government. Later he was promoted to rank of cabinet minister and given the charge of revenue, religious trust and endowment, and rehabilitation departments in the government of Shivraj Singh Chouhan.

On 21 April 2020 he again became a cabinet minister.
