= Timarni Assembly constituency =

Constituency of the Madhya Pradesh legislative assembly in India

Coordinates: 22.37°N 77.22°E

Timarni
- Constituency No. 134 for the Madhya Pradesh Legislative Assembly

Constituency details
- Country: India
- Region: Central India
- State: Madhya Pradesh
- District: Harda
- Lok Sabha constituency: Betul
- Established: 2008
- Reservation: ST

Member of Legislative Assembly
- 16th Madhya Pradesh Legislative Assembly
- Incumbent Abhijeet Shah
- Party: Indian National Congress
- Elected year: 2023
- Preceded by: Sanjay Shah Makdai

Timarni is one of the 230 Vidhan Sabha (Legislative Assembly) constituencies of Madhya Pradesh state in central India.

It comprises Timarni tehsil and parts of Khirkiya tehsil, both in Harda district and is a part of the Betul Lok Sabha constituency. As of 2023, its representative is Abhijeet Shah of the Indian National Congress.

== Members of the Legislative Assembly ==
Election	Name	Party
1962	Dhannalal Choudhary	Indian National Congress
1967	Dhannalal Choudhary	Indian National Congress
1972	Kheeprasad Bastawar	Indian National Congress
1977	Manoharlal Hazarilal	Janata Party
1980	Shyamlal Balmiki Pardeshi	Indian National Congress (Indira)
1985	Kheeprasad Bastawar	Indian National Congress
1990	Manohar Lal Rathor	Bharatiya Janata Party
1993	Manoharlal Hazarilal	Bharatiya Janata Party
1998	Uttam Singh Jagannath Prasad Sonakia	Indian National Congress
2003	Manohar Lal Rathor	Bharatiya Janata Party
2008	Sanjay Shah Makdai	Independent
2013	Sanjay Shah Makdai	Bharatiya Janata Party
2018	Sanjay Shah Makdai	Bharatiya Janata Party
2023	Abhijeet Shah	Indian National Congress

== Election results ==
=== 2023 ===
2023 Madhya Pradesh Legislative Assembly election: Timarni
Party	Candidate	Votes	%	±%
INC	Abhijeet Shah	76,554	47.41	+3.82
BJP	Sanjay Shah	75,604	46.82	+1.67
Independent	Ramesh Maskole	3,562	2.21	
NOTA	None of the above	2,561	1.59	−1.29
Majority		950	0.59	−0.97
Turnout		161,478	85.15	+2.01
INC gain from BJP		Swing		

=== 2018 ===
2018 Madhya Pradesh Legislative Assembly election: Timarni
Party	Candidate	Votes	%	±%
BJP	Sanjay Shah Makdai	64,033	45.15	
INC	Abhijeet Shah	61,820	43.59	
GGP	Nandkishor Bete Amakhal	5,722	4.03	
BSP	Bhagirath Evane	1,799	1.27	
Independent	Nanakram	1,590	1.12	
NOTA	None of the above	4,084	2.88	
Majority		2,213	1.56	
Turnout		141,816	83.14	
BJP hold		Swing		

== See also ==
- Timarni
