= Hemant Khandelwal =

Indian politician

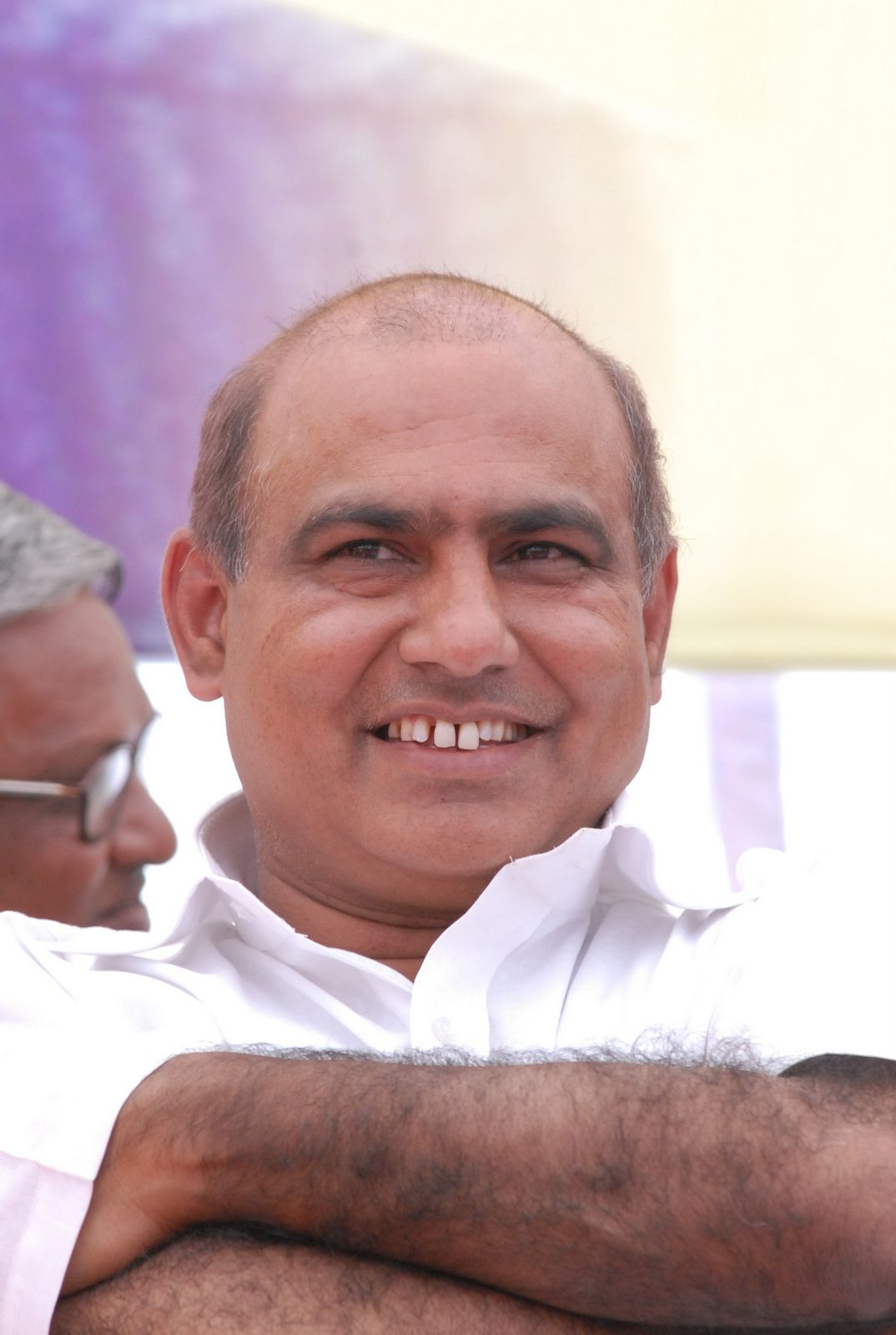

President of Bharatiya Janata Party – Madhya Pradesh
- Incumbent
- Assumed office 2 July 2025
- National President: JP Nadda; Nitin Nabin
- Preceded by: Vishnu Datt Sharma

Member of Madhya Pradesh Legislative Assembly
- Incumbent
- Assumed office 2023
- Preceded by: Nilay Daga
- Constituency: Betul
- In office 2013–2018
- Preceded by: Alkesh Arya
- Succeeded by: Nilay Daga
- Constituency: Betul

Member of Parliament, Lok Sabha
- In office 2008–2009
- Preceded by: Vijay Kumar Khandelwal
- Succeeded by: Jyoti Dhurve
- Constituency: Betul

Personal details
- Born: 3 September 1964 (age 61) Mathura, Uttar Pradesh, India
- Party: Bharatiya Janata Party
- Spouse: Ritu Khandelwal (m. 1990)
- Children: 1 son, 1 daughter
- Parents: Vijay Kumar Khandelwal (father); Kanti Khandelwal (mother)
- Education: Bachelor of Commerce, Bachelor of Laws
- Alma mater: J.H. Govt. College, Betul
- Profession: Businessman, Politician

Hemant Khandelwal (born 3 September 1964) is an Indian politician who currently serves as President of Bharatiya Janata Party – Madhya Pradesh. He serves as an MLA representing the Betul Assembly constituency in the Madhya Pradesh Legislative Assembly, having won elections in 2013 and 2023. Previously, he had served as Member of Parliament representing the Betul Lok Sabha constituency in the 14th Lok Sabha from 2008-2009 succeeding his father Vijay Kumar Khandelwal.

== Responsibilities and Offices ==
- 2007-2009 : Member of Parliament (MP)
- 2010-2013 : BJP District Chairman (Betul)
- 2013-2018 : Member of State Legislative Assembly (MLA), Madhya Pradesh
- 2014-2018 : BJP State Treasurer
- 2021 : Pravasi Karyakarta Prabhari (West Bengal Elections)
- 2022 : Pravasi Karyakarta Prabhari (Seat 61) (Uttar Pradesh Elections)
- Present : Kushabhau Thakre Trust Chairman
- 2023–Present : Member of State Legislative Assembly (MLA), Madhya Pradesh
- 2 July 2025 : President, Bharatiya Janata Party, Madhya Pradesh
