= Yogesh Pandagre =

Indian politician

Member of Madhya Pradesh Legislative Assembly
- Incumbent
- Assumed office 2018
- Preceded by: Chaitram Manekar
- Constituency: Amla

Personal details
- Political party: Bharatiya Janata Party
- Profession: Politician

Yogesh Pandagre is an Indian politician from Madhya Pradesh. He is a two time elected Member of the Madhya Pradesh Legislative Assembly from 2018 and 2023, representing Amla Assembly constituency as a Member of the Bharatiya Janata Party.

== See also ==
- List of chief ministers of Madhya Pradesh
- Madhya Pradesh Legislative Assembly
