= Mokham Singh =

Indian politician

Member of the Madhya Pradesh Legislative Assembly for Betul Vidhan Sabha
- Incumbent
- Assumed office 1957

Mokhamsingh a.k.a. Sabsingh was an Indian politician from the state of the Madhya Pradesh. He represented Betul Vidhan Sabha constituency of undivided Madhya Pradesh Legislative Assembly by winning General election of 1957.
