= Amla Assembly constituency =

Constituency of the Madhya Pradesh legislative assembly in India

Coordinates: 21.93°N 78.13°E

Amla
- Constituency No. 130 for the Madhya Pradesh Legislative Assembly

Constituency details
- Country: India
- Region: Central India
- State: Madhya Pradesh
- District: Betul
- Lok Sabha constituency: Betul
- Total electors: 207,589
- Reservation: SC

Member of Legislative Assembly
- 16th Madhya Pradesh Legislative Assembly
- Incumbent Yogesh Pandagre
- Party: Bharatiya Janata Party
- Elected year: 2023
- Preceded by: Chaitram Manekar

Amla is one of the 230 Vidhan Sabha (Legislative Assembly) constituencies of Madhya Pradesh state in central India.

It is part of Betul District and is reserved for candidates of the Scheduled Castes.

== Members of the Legislative Assembly ==
Year	Member	Party
Before 1976: Constituency did not exist
1977	Gurubux Atulkar	Indian National Congress
1980	Gurubux Atulkar	Indian National Congress (Indira)
1985	Kanahiyalal Dholeker	Bharatiya Janata Party
1990	Kanahiyalal Dholeker	Bharatiya Janata Party
1993	Gurubux Atulkar	Indian National Congress
1998	Heera Chand Chandelkar	Bharatiya Janata Party
2003	Bele Sunita	Indian National Congress
2008	Chaitram Manekar	Bharatiya Janata Party
2013	Chaitram Manekar	Bharatiya Janata Party
2018	Yogesh Pandagre	Bharatiya Janata Party
2023	Yogesh Pandagre	Bharatiya Janata Party

== Election results ==
=== 2023 ===
2023 Madhya Pradesh Legislative Assembly election: Amla
Party	Candidate	Votes	%	±%
BJP	Yogesh Pandagre	86,726	51.4	+5.18
INC	Manoj Malve	74,608	44.21	+10.07
GGP	Ranjana Wamne Vakil	1,609	0.95	−9.01
NOTA	None of the above	2,769	1.64	−0.3
Majority		12,118	7.19	−4.89
Turnout		168,743	78.03	+1.44
BJP hold		Swing		

=== 2018 ===
2018 Madhya Pradesh Legislative Assembly election: Amla
Party	Candidate	Votes	%	±%
BJP	Yogesh Pandagre	73,481	46.22	
INC	Manoj Malve	54,284	34.14	
GGP	Rakesh Mahale (Adv)	15,827	9.96	
BSP	Prabhu Mastakar	2,916	1.83	
Independent	Manoj Dehariya	2,391	1.5	
AAP	Dr. Suresh Bhumarkar	1,454	0.91	
Independent	Sadaram Jharbade	1,444	0.91	
NOTA	None of the above	3,081	1.94	
Majority		19,197	12.08	
Turnout		158,985	76.59	

== See also ==
- Amla, Madhya Pradesh
- List of constituencies of the Madhya Pradesh Legislative Assembly
- Betul district
