= Abhijeet Shah =

Indian politician

Member of the Madhya Pradesh Legislative Assembly
- Incumbent
- Assumed office 2023
- Preceded by: Sanjay Shah
- Constituency: Timarni

Personal details
- Political party: Indian National Congress
- Profession: Politician

Abhijeet Shah is an Indian politician from Madhya Pradesh. He is a Member of the Madhya Pradesh Legislative Assembly from 2023, representing Timarni Assembly constituency as a Member of the Indian National Congress.

== See also ==
- List of chief ministers of Madhya Pradesh
- Madhya Pradesh Legislative Assembly
