= Jyoti Dhurve =

Indian politician

Member of Parliament, Lok Sabha
- In office 16 May 2009 – 23 May 2019
- Preceded by: Hemant Khandelwal
- Succeeded by: Durga Das Uikey
- Constituency: Betul

Personal details
- Born: 2 June 1966 (age 59) Raipur, Chhattisgarh
- Party: Bharatiya Janata Party
- Spouse: Late Shri Prem Singh Dhurve
- Children: 2
- Occupation: Businessperson
- As of 16 December, 2016

Jyoti Dhurve (born 2 June 1966; Hindi pronunciation: [d͡ʒjoːt̪ɪ dʱʊɾʋeː]) is an Indian politician, belonging to Bhartiya Janata Party. In the 2009 election she was elected to the 15th Lok Sabha from the Betul Lok Sabha constituency of Madhya Pradesh.

She is a post-graduate in Arts from Durga Mahavidyalaya, Raipur. She is widow and was married to Late Shri Prem Singh Dhurve. She has one son his name is pranjal dhurve and resides at Betul.
