= Harda Assembly constituency =

Constituency of the Madhya Pradesh legislative assembly in India

Coordinates: 22.35°N 77.09°E

Timarni
- Constituency No. 135 for the Madhya Pradesh Legislative Assembly

Constituency details
- Country: India
- Region: Central India
- State: Madhya Pradesh
- District: Timarni
- Lok Sabha constituency: Betul
- Established: 1972
- Reservation: None

Member of Legislative Assembly
- 16th Madhya Pradesh Legislative Assembly
- Incumbent Ram Kishore Dogne
- Party: Indian National Congress
- Elected year: 2023
- Preceded by: Kamal Patel

Harda is one of the 230 Vidhan Sabha (Legislative Assembly) constituencies of Madhya Pradesh state, in central India.

It is part of Harda District. As of 2023, it is represented by Ram Kishore Dogne, of the Indian National Congress party.

== Member of the Legislative Assembly ==
Election	Name	Party
1952	Maheshdutta	Kisan Mazdoor Praja Party
1952	Premnath	Kisan Mazdoor Praja Party
1957	Gulab Bai Rameshwar	Indian National Congress
1962	Laxmanrao Naik	Indian National Congress
1967	Nanhelal Patel	Indian National Congress
1972	Nanhelal Patel	Indian National Congress
1977	Babulal Silapuria	Janata Party
1980	Vishnu Shivkumar Rajoriya	Indian National Congress (Indira)
1985	Vishnu Shivkumar Rajoriya	Indian National Congress
1990	Badri Narain Agarwal	Bharatiya Janata Party
1993	Kamal Patel	Bharatiya Janata Party
1998	Kamal Patel	Bharatiya Janata Party
2003	Kamal Patel	Bharatiya Janata Party
2008	Kamal Patel	Bharatiya Janata Party
2013	Ram Kishore Dogne	Indian National Congress
2018	Kamal Patel	Bharatiya Janata Party
2023	Ram Kishore Dogne	Indian National Congress

== Election results ==
=== 2023 ===
2023 Madhya Pradesh Legislative Assembly election: Harda
Party	Candidate	Votes	%	±%
INC	Ram Kishore Dogne	94,553	48.1	+2.91
BJP	Kamal Patel	93,683	47.66	−1.34
NOTA	None of the above	2,357	1.2	−0.58
Majority		870	0.44	−3.37
Turnout		196,570	83.29	+1.75
INC gain from BJP		Swing		

=== 2018 ===
2018 Madhya Pradesh Legislative Assembly election: Harda
Party	Candidate	Votes	%	±%
BJP	Kamal Patel	85,651	49.0	
INC	Ram Kishore Dogne	78,984	45.19	
NOTA	None of the above	3,110	1.78	
Majority		6,667	3.81	
Turnout		174,782	81.54	
BJP gain from INC		Swing		

=== 2013 ===
2013 Madhya Pradesh Legislative Assembly election: Harda
Party	Candidate	Votes	%	±%
INC	Ram Kishore Dogne	74,607	48.19	
BJP	Kamal Patel	69956	45.18	
BSP	Saroj Bai Chorasiya	1914	1.24	N/A
Independent	Vinay Kumar Sharma	1320	0.85	
Independent	Rajendra Patel	1318	0.85	
SWJP	Shamim Modi	856	0.55	
Independent	Vikrant	489	0.32	
Independent	Yogendra Kumar Bhatt	341	0.22	
Independent	Pawan Sharma	292	0.19	
Independent	Dev Kisan Saraf	215	0.14	
Independent	Bharat Singh	189	0.12	
NOTA	None of the Above	3326	2.15	
Majority				
Turnout		154823	77.94	
Swing to INC from BJP		Swing		

== See also ==
- Harda
