= Bharatiya Janata Party – Madhya Pradesh =

Madhya Pradesh affiliate of the Bharatiya Janata Party

- Abbreviation: BJP
- Leader: Mohan Yadav (Chief Minister)
- President: Hemant Khandelwal
- General Secretary: Hitanand Sharma (Organisation)
- Founder: Atal Bihari Vajpayee; Lal Krishna Advani; Murli Manohar Joshi; Nanaji Deshmukh; K. R. Malkani; Sikandar Bakht; Vijay Kumar Malhotra; Vijaya Raje Scindia; Bhairon Singh Shekhawat; Shanta Kumar; Ram Jethmalani; Jagannathrao Joshi
- Founded: 6 April 1980 (46 years ago)
- Headquarters: Pandit Deendayal Parisar E-2, Arera Colony, Bhopal – 462 016 Madhya Pradesh
- Colours: Saffron
- ECI status: National Party
- Seats in Rajya Sabha: 9 / 11
- Seats in Lok Sabha: 29 / 29
- Seats in Madhya Pradesh Legislative Assembly: 166 / 230

Election symbol
- Lotus

Party flag

Website
- mp.bjp.org

Bharatiya Janata Party – Madhya Pradesh (BJP Madhya Pradesh) is the affiliate of Bharatiya Janata Party (BJP) for the state of Madhya Pradesh. The party appointed V. D. Sharma, who took over from Rakesh Singh, as the President of the party's state unit in Madhya Pradesh on 15 February 2020. On 23 March 2020, Shivraj Singh Chouhan was sworn in as the Chief Minister of Madhya Pradesh after the Kamal Nath-led government collapsed due to the defection of Jyotiraditya Scindia.

== Electoral history ==
=== Lok Sabha ===
Year	Seats won	+/-	Outcome
Bharatiya Jana Sangh
1952	0 / 29	Steady	Opposition
1957	0 / 35	Steady	Opposition
1962	3 / 36	▲3	Opposition
1967	10 / 37	▲7	Opposition
1971	11 / 37	▲1	Opposition
Bharatiya Janata Party
1980	0 / 40	Steady	Opposition
1984	0 / 40	Steady	Opposition
1989	27 / 38	▲27	Outside support to JD
1991	12 / 40	▼15	Opposition
1996	27 / 40	▲15	Government, later Opposition
1998	30 / 40	▲3	Government
1999	29 / 40	▼1	Government
2004	25 / 29	▼4	Opposition
2009	16 / 29	▼9	Opposition
2014	27 / 29	▲11	Government
2019	28 / 29	▲1	Government
2024	29 / 29	▲1	Government

=== Legislative Assembly ===
Year	Seats won	+/-	Vote share (%)	+/- (%)	Outcome
Bharatiya Jana Sangh
1952	0 / 232	Steady	3.58%	Steady	Steady
1957	10 / 288	▲10	9.90%	▲6.32%	Opposition
1962	41 / 288	▲31	16.66%	▲6.76%	Opposition
1967	78 / 296	▲37	28.28%	▲11.62%	Government, later Opposition
1972	48 / 296	▼30	28.64%	▲0.39%	Opposition
Bharatiya Janata Party
1980	60 / 320	▲60	30.34%	▲30.34%	Opposition
1985	58 / 320	▼2	32.45%	▲2.11%	Opposition
1990	220 / 320	▲162	39.14%	▲6.69%	Government
1993	117 / 320	▼103	38.82%	▼0.32%	Opposition
1998	119 / 320	▲2	39.28%	▲0.46%	Opposition
2003	173 / 230	▲54	42.50%	▲3.22%	Government
2008	143 / 230	▼30	37.64%	▼4.86%	Government
2013	165 / 230	▲22	44.88%	▲7.24%	Government
2018	109 / 230	▼56	41.02%	▼3.86%	Opposition, later Government
2023	163 / 230	▲54	48.62%	▲7.6%	Government

== Leadership ==
=== Chief Minister ===
#	Portrait	Name	Constituency	Term of office			Assembly
1		Sunder Lal Patwa	Bhojpur	5 March 1990	15 December 1992	2 years, 285 days	9th
2		Uma Bharti	Malhara	8 December 2003	23 August 2004	259 days	12th
3		Babulal Gaur	Govindpura	23 August 2004	29 November 2005	1 year, 98 days	12th
4		Shivraj Singh Chouhan	Budhni	29 November 2005	12 December 2008	16 years, 283 days	12th
4		Shivraj Singh Chouhan	Budhni	12 December 2008	13 December 2013	16 years, 283 days	13th
4		Shivraj Singh Chouhan	Budhni	13 December 2013	17 December 2018	16 years, 283 days	14th
4		Shivraj Singh Chouhan	Budhni	23 March 2020	13 December 2023	16 years, 283 days	15th
5		Mohan Yadav	Ujjain South	13 December 2023	Incumbent	2 years, 323 days	16th

=== Deputy Chief Minister ===
#	Portrait	Name	Constituency	Term of office			Assembly	Chief minister
2		Rajendra Shukla	Rewa	13 December 2023	Incumbent	2 years, 323 days	16th	Mohan Yadav
3		Jagdish Devda	Malhargarh	13 December 2023	Incumbent	2 years, 323 days	16th	Mohan Yadav

=== Leader of the Opposition ===
#	Portrait	Name	Constituency	Term of office			Assembly	Chief Minister
1		Sunder Lal Patwa	Sehore	4 July 1980	10 March 1985	4 years, 249 days	7th	Arjun Singh; Motilal Vora; Shyama Charan Shukla
2		Kailash Chandra Joshi	Bagli	23 March 1985	3 March 1990	4 years, 346 days	8th	Arjun Singh; Motilal Vora; Shyama Charan Shukla
3		Vikram Verma	Dhar	24 December 1993	1 December 1998	4 years, 342 days	10th	Digvijaya Singh
4		Gauri Shankar Shejwar	Sanchi	2 February 1999	1 September 2002	3 years, 211 days	11th	Digvijaya Singh
5		Babulal Gaur	Govindpura	4 September 2002	5 December 2003	1 year, 92 days	11th	Digvijaya Singh
6		Gopal Bhargava	Rehli	8 January 2019	23 March 2020	1 year, 75 days	15th	Kamal Nath

=== President ===
#	Portrait	Name	Period		
1		Sunder Lal Patwa	1980	1983	3 years
2		Kailash Chandra Joshi	1983	1985	2 years
3		Shivprasad Chanpuria	1 April 1985	11 January 1986	285 days
(1)		Sunder Lal Patwa	1986	1990	4 years
4		Lakkhiram Agarwal	1990	1994	4 years
5		Laxminarayan Pandey	1994	1997	3 years
6		Nand Kumar Sai	1997	2000	3 years
7		Vikram Verma	14 August 2000	26 August 2002	2 years, 12 days
(2)		Kailash Chandra Joshi	26 August 2002	30 May 2005	2 years, 277 days
8		Shivraj Singh Chouhan	30 May 2005	17 February 2006	263 days
9		Satyanarayan Jatiya	17 February 2006	20 November 2006	276 days
10		Narendra Singh Tomar	20 November 2006	8 May 2010	3 years, 169 days
11		Prabhat Jha	8 May 2010	16 December 2012	2 years, 222 days
(10)		Narendra Singh Tomar	16 December 2012	16 August 2014	1 year, 243 days
12		Nandkumar Singh Chauhan	16 August 2014	18 April 2018	3 years, 245 days
13		Rakesh Singh	18 April 2018	15 February 2020	1 year, 303 days
14		V. D. Sharma	15 February 2020	2 July 2025	5 years, 137 days
15		Hemant Khandelwal	2 July 2025	incumbent	1 year, 122 days

== Bjp in other states ==
- Bharatiya Janata Party – Gujarat
- Bharatiya Janata Party – Uttar Pradesh
- Bharatiya Janata Party – Kerala
- Organisation of the Bharatiya Janata Party
