= Bhagwat Patel =

Indian politician (c.1936–2020)

Madhya Pradesh Legislative Assembly
- In office 1990–1993
- Preceded by: Ashok Sable
- Succeeded by: Ashok Sable
- Constituency: Betul

Personal details
- Born: c. 1936
- Died: 8 February 2020 (aged 84)
- Party: Bharatiya Janata Party

Bhagwat Patel (c. 1936 – 8 February 2020) was an Indian politician from Madhya Pradesh belonging to Bharatiya Janata Party. He was a legislator of the Madhya Pradesh Legislative Assembly.

== Biography ==
Patel was elected as a legislator of the Madhya Pradesh Legislative Assembly from Betul 1990. He also contested from Betul in 1993 but he was not elected in that election.

Singh died on 8 February 2020 at the age of 84.
