= Handia, Madhya Pradesh =

Handia Handiya, Hindia
- Village
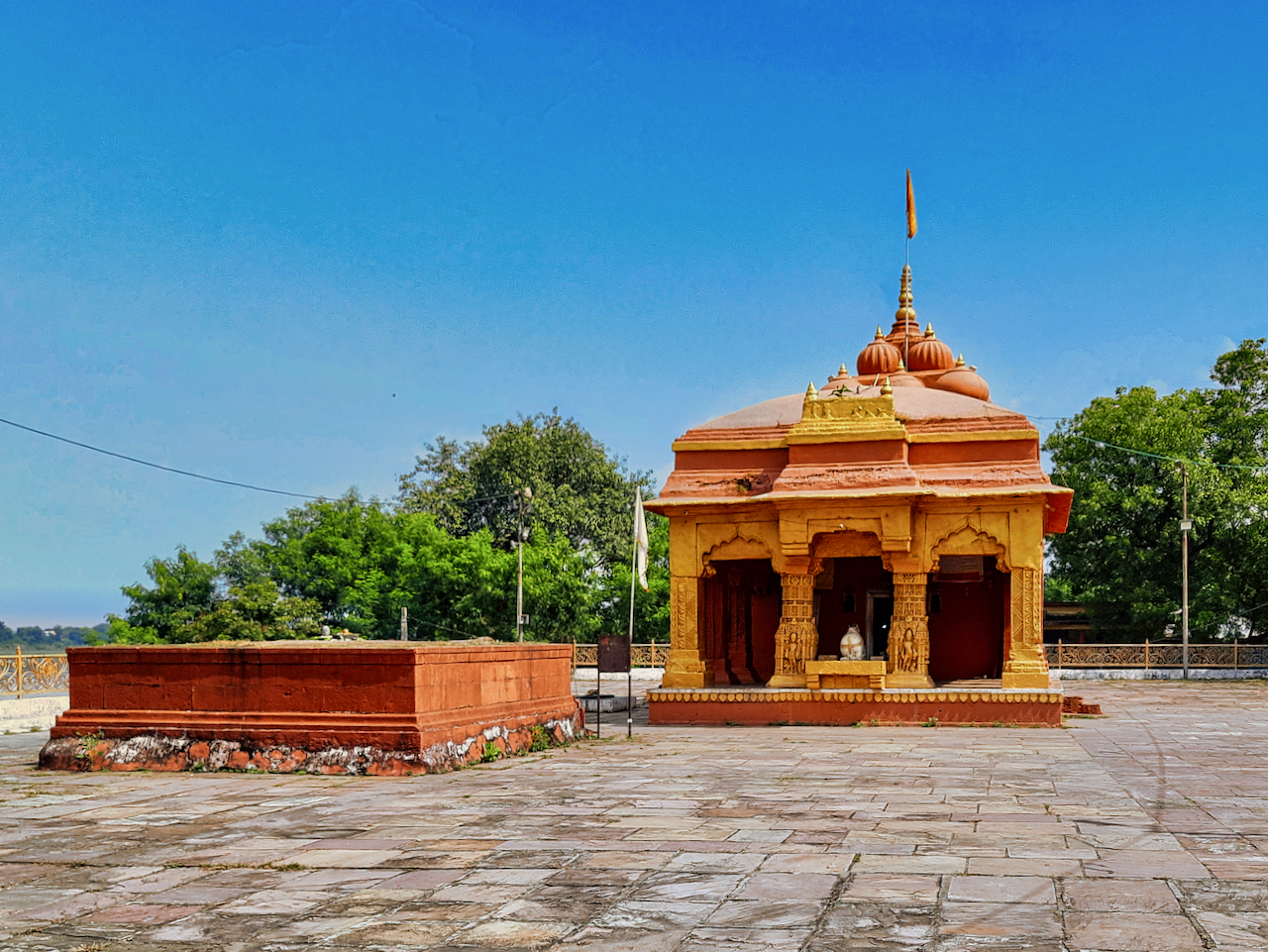

- Location within Madhya Pradesh
- Coordinates: 22.486°N 76.983°E
- Country: India
- State: Madhya Pradesh
- District: Harda
- Tehsil: Handia
- Elevation: 276 m (906 ft)

Population (2011)
  - Total: 4,211
- Time zone: UTC+5:30 (IST)
- Postal Index Number: 461331
- STD code: 07577

Handia is a village in Madhya Pradesh state of India. It is located in the Handiya block and tehsil of the Harda district. Handia is located on the left bank of the Narmada river; Nemawar is located on the opposite side, which belongs to Dewas district.

Handia was a prosperous town during the Mughal period. After the Maratha conquest of region, Harda replaced it as the most important town in the area, and Handia was reduced to the status of a village.

== History ==
In the Mughal chronicles and early British records, the name of Handia often appears as Hindia. During the Mughal period, Handia was a sarkar (subdivision) comprising 23 mahals (smaller divisions), including Harda. The Mughal-era chronicle Chahar Gulshan (1759 CE) mentions Golconda-Asir-Hindia and Hindia-Sironj roads among the 24 important roads of the Mughal empire. Mulla Do-Piyaza was buried in Handia, and his tomb is located here.

In 1742, Marathas led by Peshwa Balaji Baji Rao captured the area, and displaced the Muslim governor of the Handia sarkar. Subsequently, Harda replaced Handia as the most important town in the area, as the local Maratha amil (chief) resided at Harda. The British East India Company invaded the area during the Third Anglo-Maratha War and took control of the local fortress for a brief period. The English author Carnaticus, writing in 1820, states:

Hindia was formerly a town of considerable note, but now only bears the ruinous and decayed vestiges of its ancient extent and splendour.

— Carnaticus, Summary of the Mahratta and Pindarree Campaign (1820)

Even after the Maratha defeat in the war, the Scindias retained control of the Harda-Handia tract. Handia was the headquarters of a district in Daulat Rao Sindhia's kingdom. The area was ceded to the British in 1844, but the cession was completed only in 1860. It was a part of the Hoshangabad district, until the Harda district was carved out in 1998.

== Demographics ==
According to the 2011 census of India, Handia has a population of 4221, which includes 2196 males and 2025 females. The effective literacy rate (age 6 years and above) is 78.2%.
