= Deepchand Gothi =

Indian politician

Deepchand Laxmichand Gothi (Hindi pronunciation: [d̪iːpt͡ʃən̪d̪ ləkʃmiːt͡ʃən̪d̪ goːʈʰiː]) was an Indian politician from the state of the Madhya Pradesh. He represented Betul Vidhan Sabha constituency of the undivided Madhya Pradesh Legislative Assembly by winning the 1957 Madhya Pradesh Legislative Assembly election.
