= Pandharmati =

Village in Madhya Pradesh, India

- Village
- Interactive map of Pandharmati
- Coordinates: 22°14′19″N 77°16′40″E

Population (2011)
  - Total: 669
- Nearest city: Agra

Pandharmati is a village in Harda District, madhya Pradesh, India.

== Statistical data ==
According to the 2001 census, there were approximately 127 households with a total population of 669. Of this population, 125 were under the age of 6. The male population was 358 and the female population was 311. The number of literate individuals was 295 (180 men and 115 women).
