= Dopiaza =

Persian curry dish

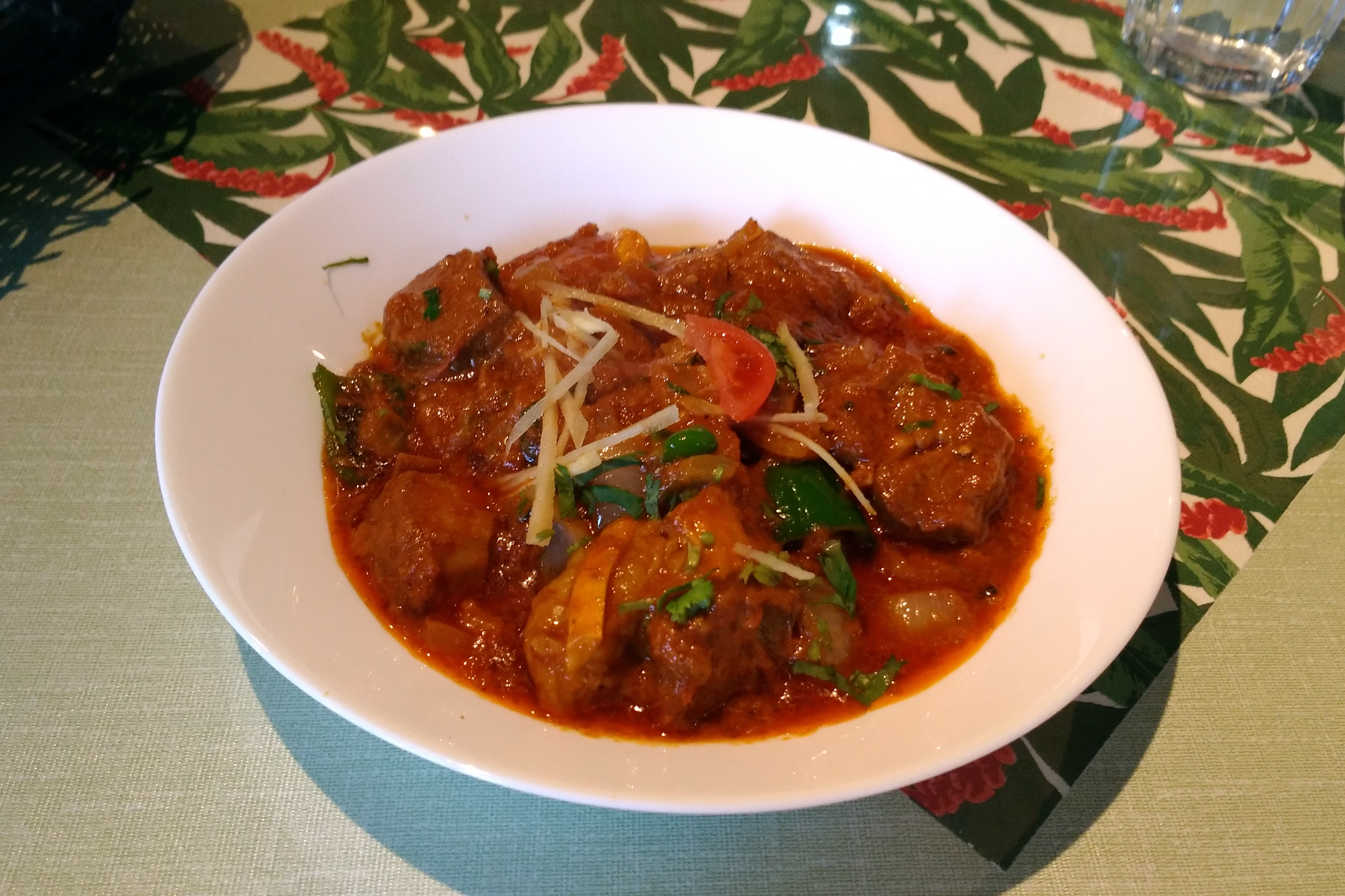
- Persian Shiraz-style curry with onions
- Course: Main course
- Region or state: Afghanistan, Bangladesh, Iran, India and Pakistan
- Main ingredients: Meat, onions

Dopiaza (Persian: دوپیازه, Urdu: ڈوپیاسس, Hindi: दो प्याज़ा, meaning "two onions") is a curry that contains onions as a major ingredient. It is recorded in Mughlai cuisine in the 16th century, and occurs in both Iranian and South Asian cuisine. It has become widespread in South Asia and in British Indian cuisine.

== History ==
Dopiaza ("two onions" in Persian), is named for its use of onions in two ways in the dish: boiled in the gravy, and raw or fried as a garnish. The English word is borrowed partly from Urdu dopiyāza and partly from Persian dupiyāza, where du means "two" and piyāz means "onion".

A legend tells that the fictional Mulla Do-Piyaza in the Mughal emperor Akbar's court in Delhi created the dish by accident by adding onions to the dish twice.

An actual recipe for dopiaza was however given by one of Akbar's real courtiers, Abul Fazl in a 16th-century text, the Ain-i-Akbari. It uses a ratio of two parts onions to ten of meat. The historian of food Lizzie Collingham comments that the recipe uses substantial quantities of spices (pepper, cardamom, cloves, coriander, cumin), implying Hindustani influence on the Mughlai dish. The dish was taken up in Anglo-Indian cuisine during the British Raj, and then brought back to Britain, appearing on the menu of Veeraswamy restaurant (founded in 1926), and later as a standard dish in British Indian restaurants.

== Dish ==
In Iran, dopiazeh can be made with cubed or ground lamb or chicken, potatoes, and plenty of sliced onions. A vegetarian version, Dopiazeh aloo is a potato and onion curry; it can be served with a salad, or used as a side dish.

In India, dopiaza is associated with the city of Hyderabad. The Indian cook Madhur Jaffrey's do piaza flavours a shoulder of lamb with boiled onions, garlic, ginger, cinnamon, cardamom, cloves, coriander, and cumin, and some yoghurt. It is made spicy hot with cayenne pepper; some garam masala and fried onions are added at the end, cooked for a few minutes.

In Britain, the BBC gives a recipe for a prawn dopiaza, using onions and spices much as Jaffrey does, but with the addition of honey and peas to the sauce. Butter is used for frying the onions and prawns.

Dopiaza around the world

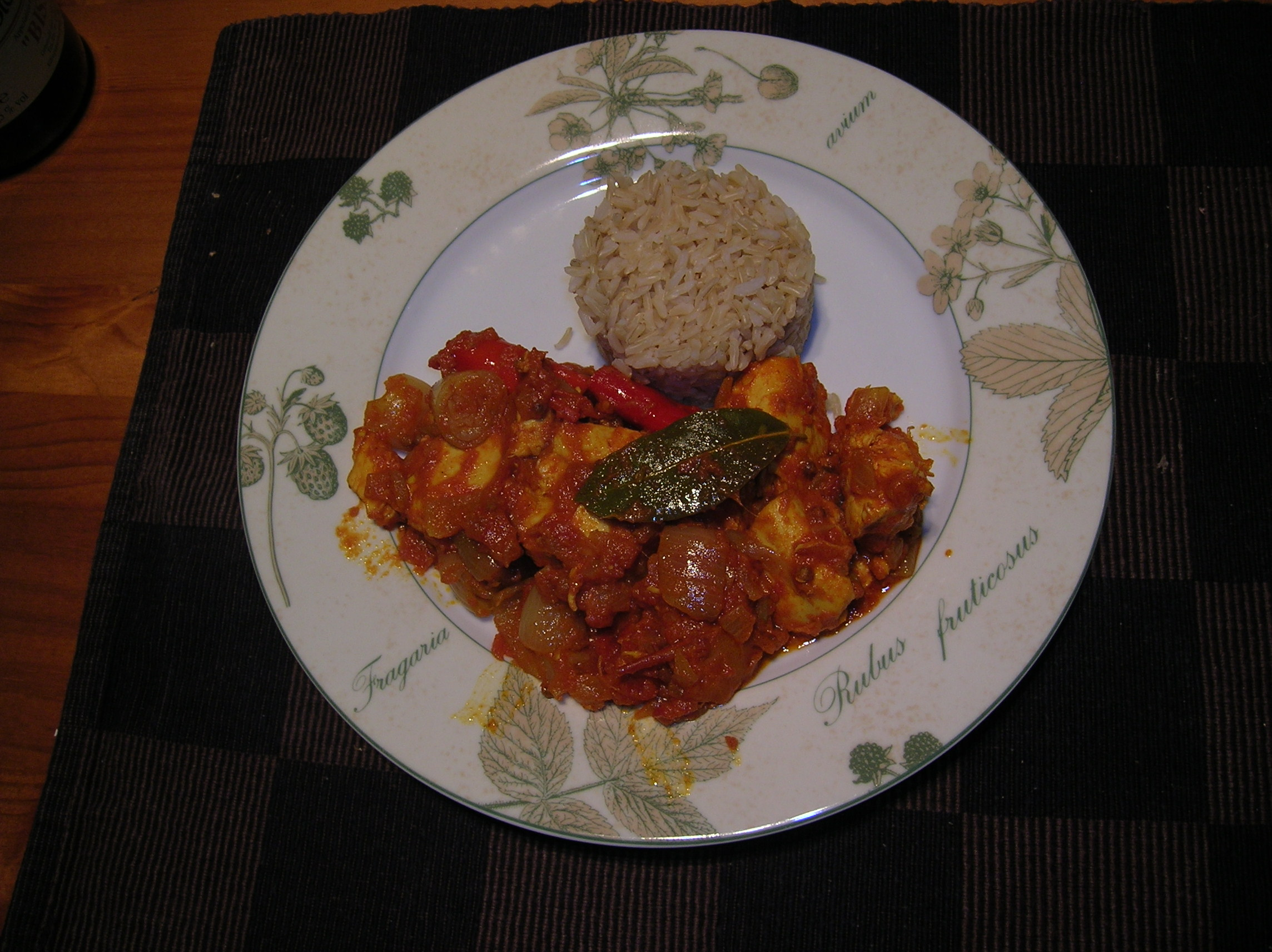
Chicken dopiaza, Netherlands, 2011

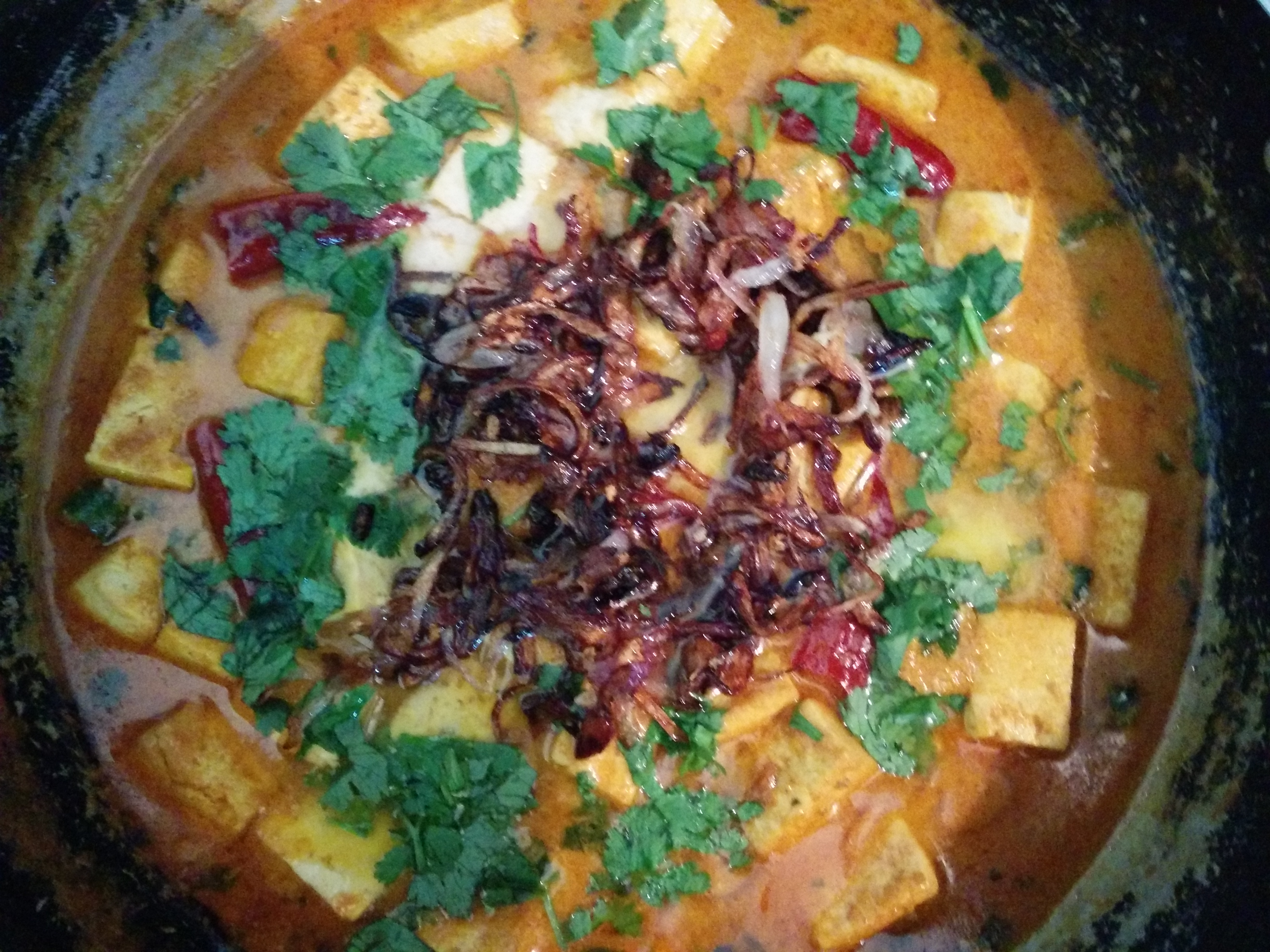
Paneer do-pyaza, Chennai, India, 2014

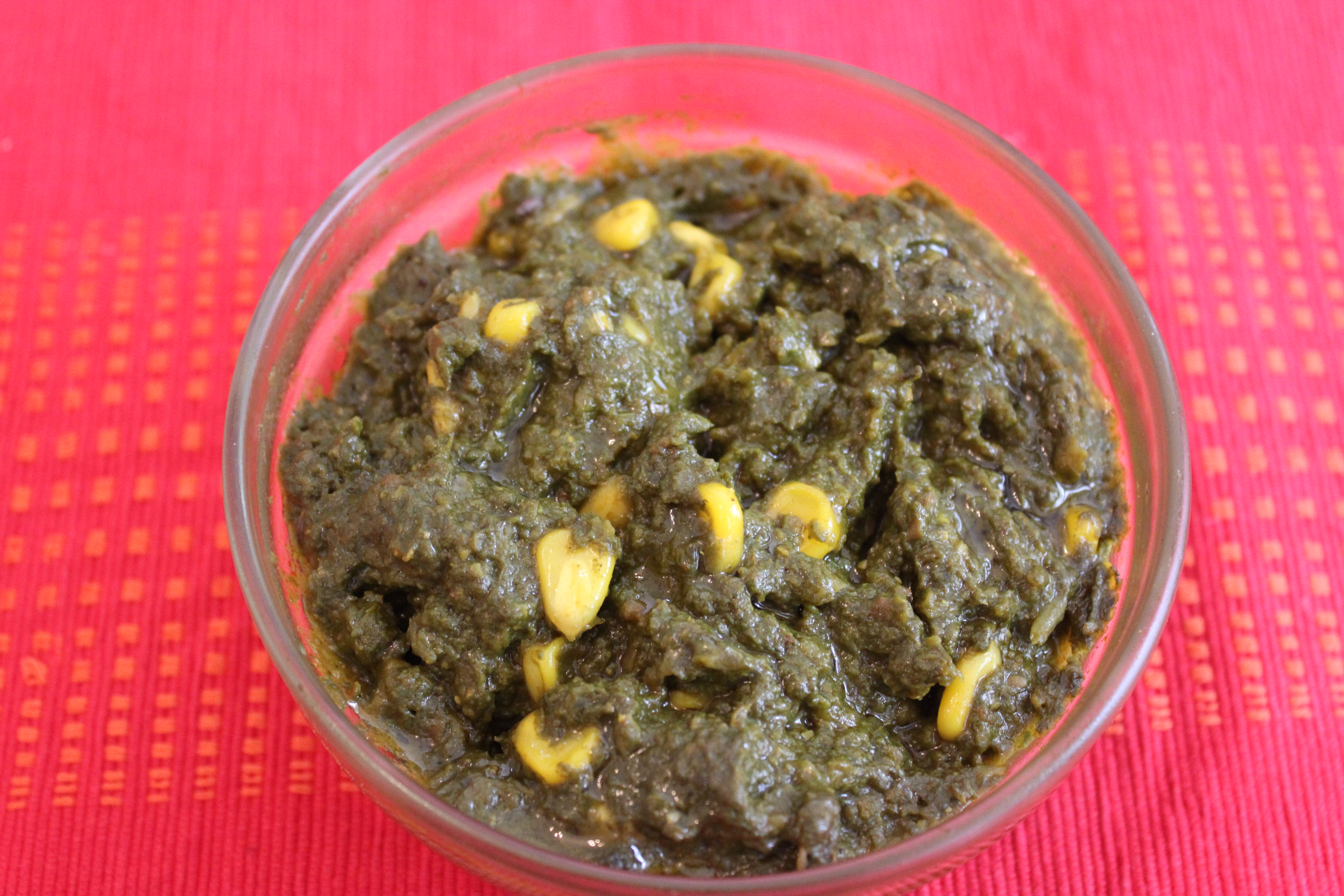
Bhindi do pyaza, Awadh, India, 2014

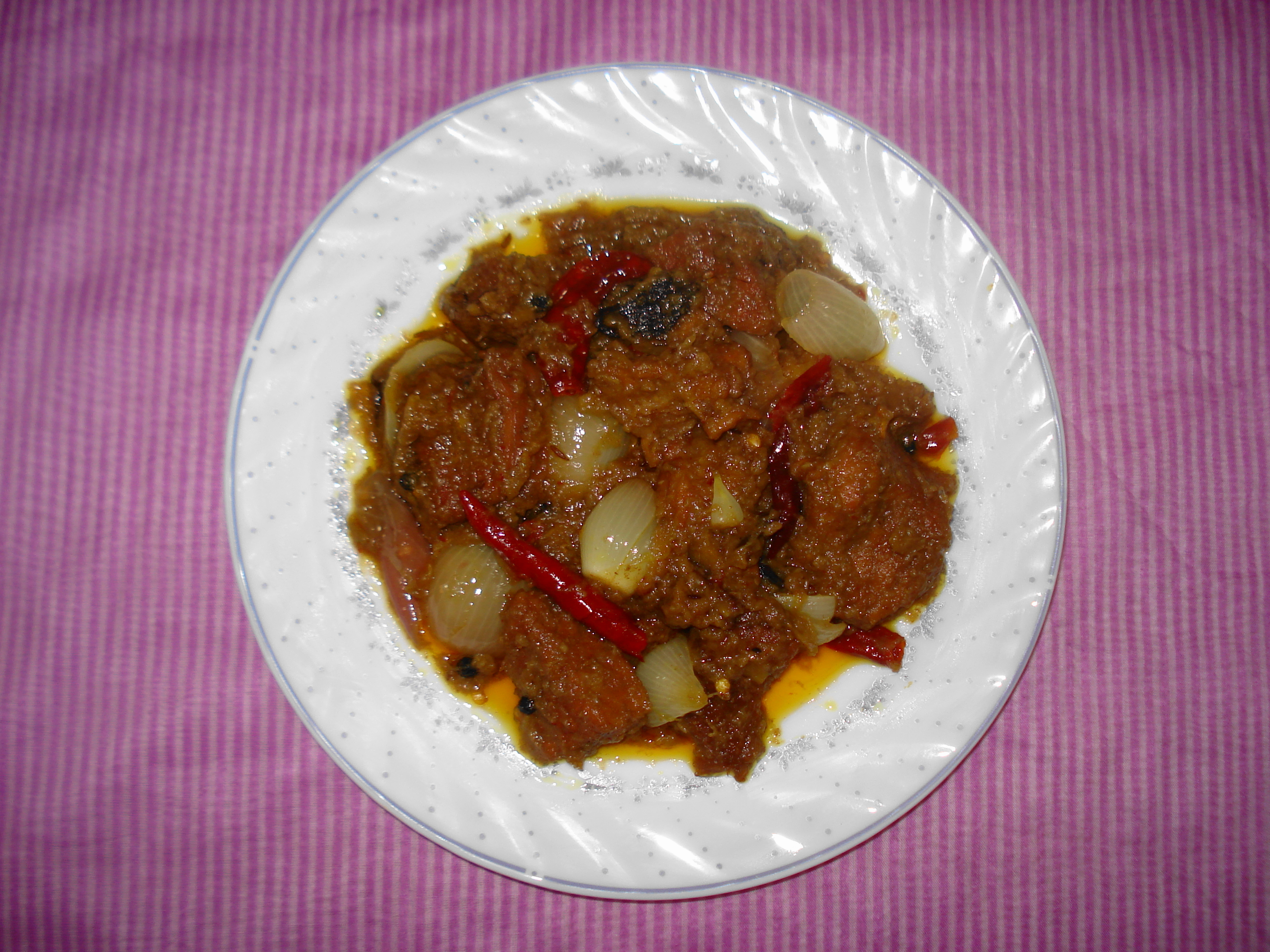
Chicken dopiaza, India, 2012

== See also ==
- List of onion dishes
