= V. D. Sharma =

Indian politician (born 1970)

Vishnu Datt Sharma
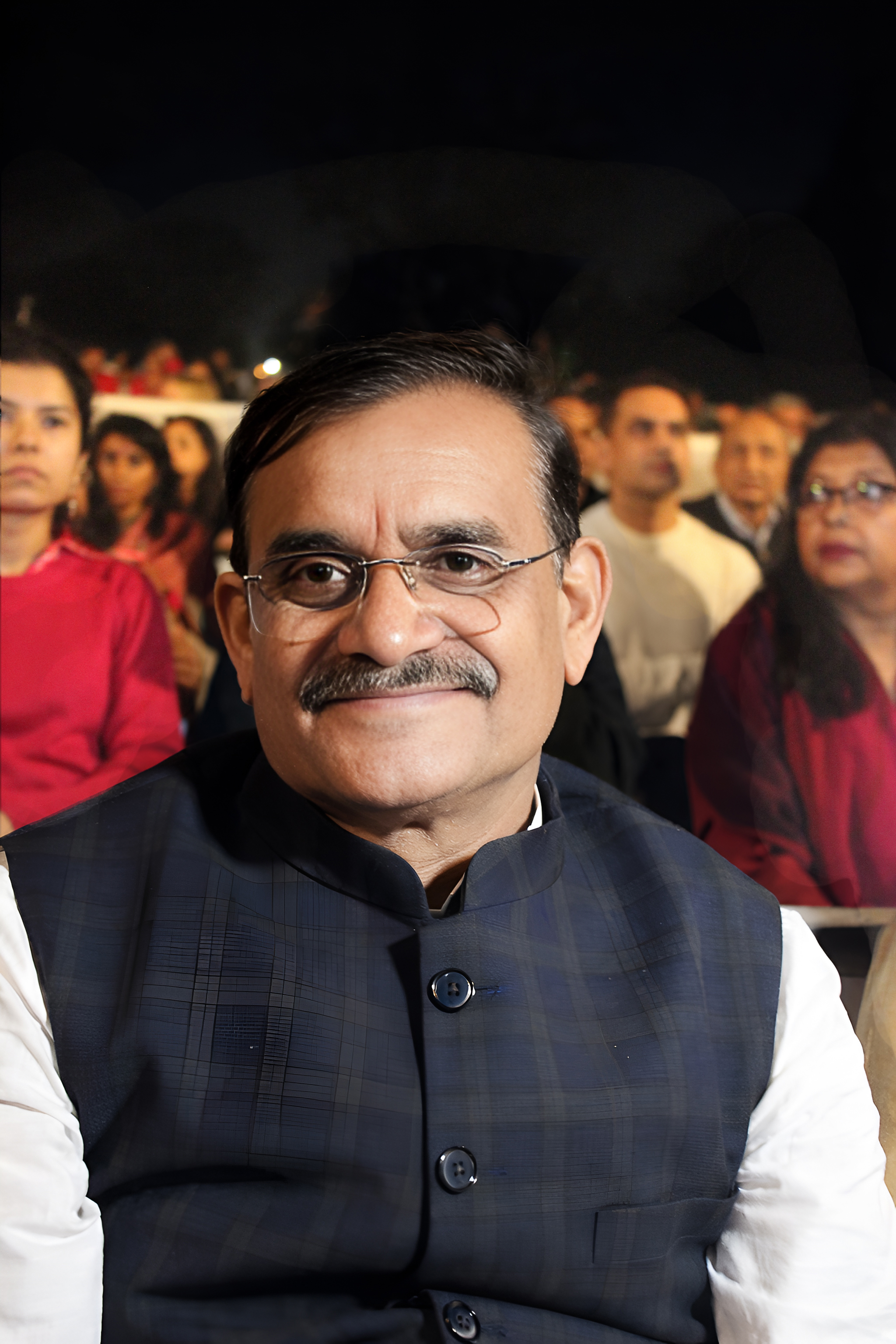

President of Bharatiya Janata Party – Madhya Pradesh
- In office 15 February 2020 – 2 July 2025
- Preceded by: Rakesh Singh
- Succeeded by: Hemant Khandelwal

Member of Parliament, Lok Sabha
- Incumbent
- Assumed office 23 May 2019
- Preceded by: Nagendra Singh
- Constituency: Khajuraho

Personal details
- Born: 1 October 1970 (age 55) Surjanpur, Morena, Madhya Pradesh, India
- Party: Bharatiya Janata Party
- Spouse: Stuti Sharma (m. 2019)
- Parents: Amar Singh Dandotiya (father); Jodha Bai (mother)
- Education: M.Sc. (Agriculture)
- Alma mater: Government Agricultural College – Bhind
- Profession: Politician

V. D. Sharma also known as Vishnu Datt Sharma (born 1 October 1970; Hindi pronunciation: [ʋɪʂɳʊ d̪ət̪ː(ə) ʃəɾmaː]) is an Indian politician and member of the 18th Lok Sabha, representing Khajuraho constituency, Madhya Pradesh. He is a member of the Bharatiya Janata Party and Former BJP President in the state of Madhya Pradesh.

In 2024 Lok Sabha Election, Sharma won with 7,72,774 votes. He defeated Kamlesh Kumar of Bahujan Samaj Party by 541229 votes.
