= Betul Lok Sabha constituency =

Lok Sabha constituency in Madhya Pradesh

Coordinates: 21.9°N 77.9°E

Betul
- Lok Sabha constituency
- Interactive Map Outlining Betul Lok Sabha constituency

Constituency details
- Country: India
- Region: Central India
- State: Madhya Pradesh
- Assembly constituencies: Multai; Amla; Betul; Ghoradongri; Bhainsdehi; Timarni; Harda; Harsud
- Established: 1952
- Total electors: 18,95,331
- Reservation: ST

Member of Parliament
- 18th Lok Sabha
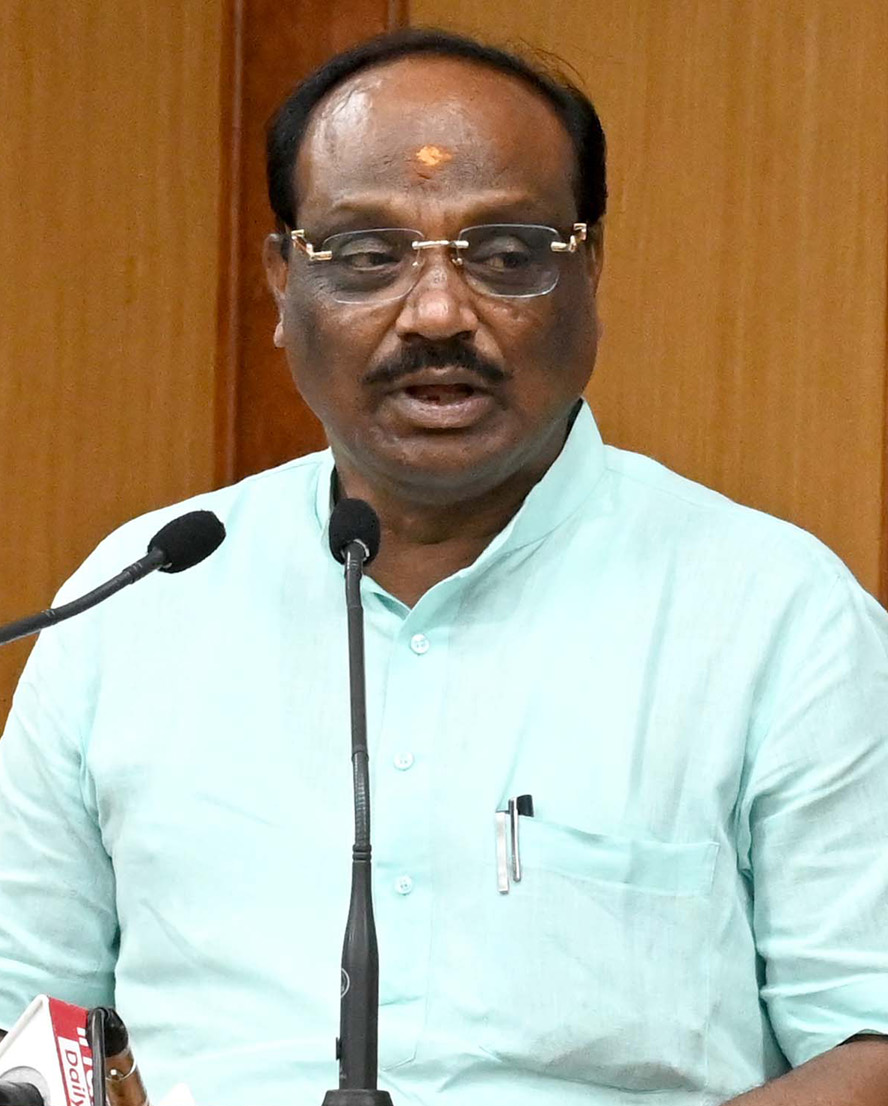
- Incumbent Durga Das Uikey
- Party: Bharatiya Janata Party
- Elected year: 2024

Betul is one of the 29 Lok Sabha constituencies in Madhya Pradesh state in central India. This constituency is reserved for the candidates belonging to the Scheduled Tribes. It covers the entire Betul and Harda districts and part of Khandwa district.

== Assembly segments ==
Like most other Lok Sabha seats in MP and Chhattisgarh, with few seats like Durg (which has nine assembly segments under it) being exceptions, Betul Lok Sabha seat has 8 assembly seats as its segments. Presently, since the delimitation of the parliamentary and legislative assembly constituencies in 2008, Betul Lok Sabha constituency comprises the following eight Vidhan Sabha (Legislative Assembly) segments:

#	Name	District	Member	Party	2024 Lead
129	Multai	Betul	Chandrashekhar Deshmukh	BJP	BJP
130	Amla (SC)	Betul	Dr.Yogesh Pandagre	BJP	BJP
131	Betul	Betul	Hemant Khandelwal	BJP	BJP
132	Ghoradongri (ST)	Betul	Ganga Sanjay Uikey	BJP	BJP
133	Bhainsdehi (ST)	Betul	Mahendrasingh Chauhan	BJP	BJP
134	Timarni (ST)	Harda	Abhijeet Shah	INC	BJP
135	Harda	Harda	Dr.Ram Kishore Dogne	INC	BJP
176	Harsud (ST)	Khandwa	Kunwar Vijay Shah	BJP	BJP

== Members of Parliament ==
Year	Member	Party
1952	Bhikulal Chandak	Indian National Congress
1967	Narendra Kumar Salve	Indian National Congress
1971	Narendra Kumar Salve	Indian National Congress
1977	Subhash Chandra Ahuja	Janata Party
1980	Gufran Azam	Indian National Congress (I)
1984	Aslam Sher Khan	Indian National Congress
1989	Arif Beg	Bharatiya Janata Party
1991	Aslam Sher Khan	Indian National Congress
1996	Vijay Khandelwal	Bharatiya Janata Party
1998	Vijay Khandelwal	Bharatiya Janata Party
1999	Vijay Khandelwal	Bharatiya Janata Party
2004	Vijay Khandelwal	Bharatiya Janata Party
2008^	Hemant Khandelwal	Bharatiya Janata Party
2009	Jyoti Dhurve	Bharatiya Janata Party
2014	Jyoti Dhurve	Bharatiya Janata Party
2019	Durga Das Uikey	Bharatiya Janata Party
2024	Durga Das Uikey	Bharatiya Janata Party

^ by poll

== Election results ==
=== 2024 ===
2024 Indian general election: Betul
Party	Candidate	Votes	%	±%
BJP	Durga Das Uikey	848,236	60.76	▲1.02
INC	Ramu Tekam	468,475	33.56	▲0.35
BSP	Arjun Ashok Bhalavi	26,597	1.91	▲0.17
NOTA	None of the above	20,322	1.46	▼0.25
BAP	Anil Uikey	10,576	0.76	New
Independent	Bhurelal Chotelal Bethekar	7,811	0.56	N/A
Independent	Bhagcharan Warkade	5,968	0.43	▼0.28
GGP	Suner Uikey	4,186	0.30	▼0.07
Majority		3,79,761	27.20	▲0.67
Turnout		13,96,020	73.66	▼4.52
BJP hold		Swing		

=== 2019 ===
2019 Indian general elections: Betul
Party	Candidate	Votes	%	±%
BJP	Durga Das Uikey	811,248	59.74	−1.69
INC	Ramu Tekam	4,51,007	33.21	+3.14
BSP	Ashok Bhalavi	23,573	1.74	+0.17
Majority		3,60,241	26.53	
Turnout		13,58,336	78.18	+13.02
BJP hold		Swing		

=== 2014 ===
2014 Indian general elections: Betul
Party	Candidate	Votes	%	±%
BJP	Jyoti Dhurve	643,651	61.43	
INC	Ajay Shah "Makrai"	3,15,037	30.07	
AAP	Rajesh Sariyam	20,627	1.97	
BSP	Sohan Lal Uikey	16,461	1.57	
Majority		3,28,614	31.36	
Turnout		10,47,719	65.16	
BJP hold		Swing		

=== 2009 ===
2009 Indian general elections: Betul
Party	Candidate	Votes	%	±%
BJP	Jyoti Dhurve	334,939	52.62	
INC	Ojharam Evane	2,37,622	37.33	
BSP	Rama Kakodia	13,586	2.13	
Majority		97,317	15.29	
Turnout		6,36,555	49.47	
BJP hold		Swing		

== See also ==
- Betul district
- List of constituencies of the Lok Sabha
