= Betul Assembly constituency =

Constituency of the Madhya Pradesh legislative assembly in India

Coordinates: 21.91°N 77.90°E

Betul
- Constituency No. 131 for the Madhya Pradesh Legislative Assembly

Constituency details
- Country: India
- Region: Central India
- State: Madhya Pradesh
- District: Betul
- Lok Sabha constituency: Betul
- Established: 1951
- Reservation: None

Member of Legislative Assembly
- 16th Madhya Pradesh Legislative Assembly
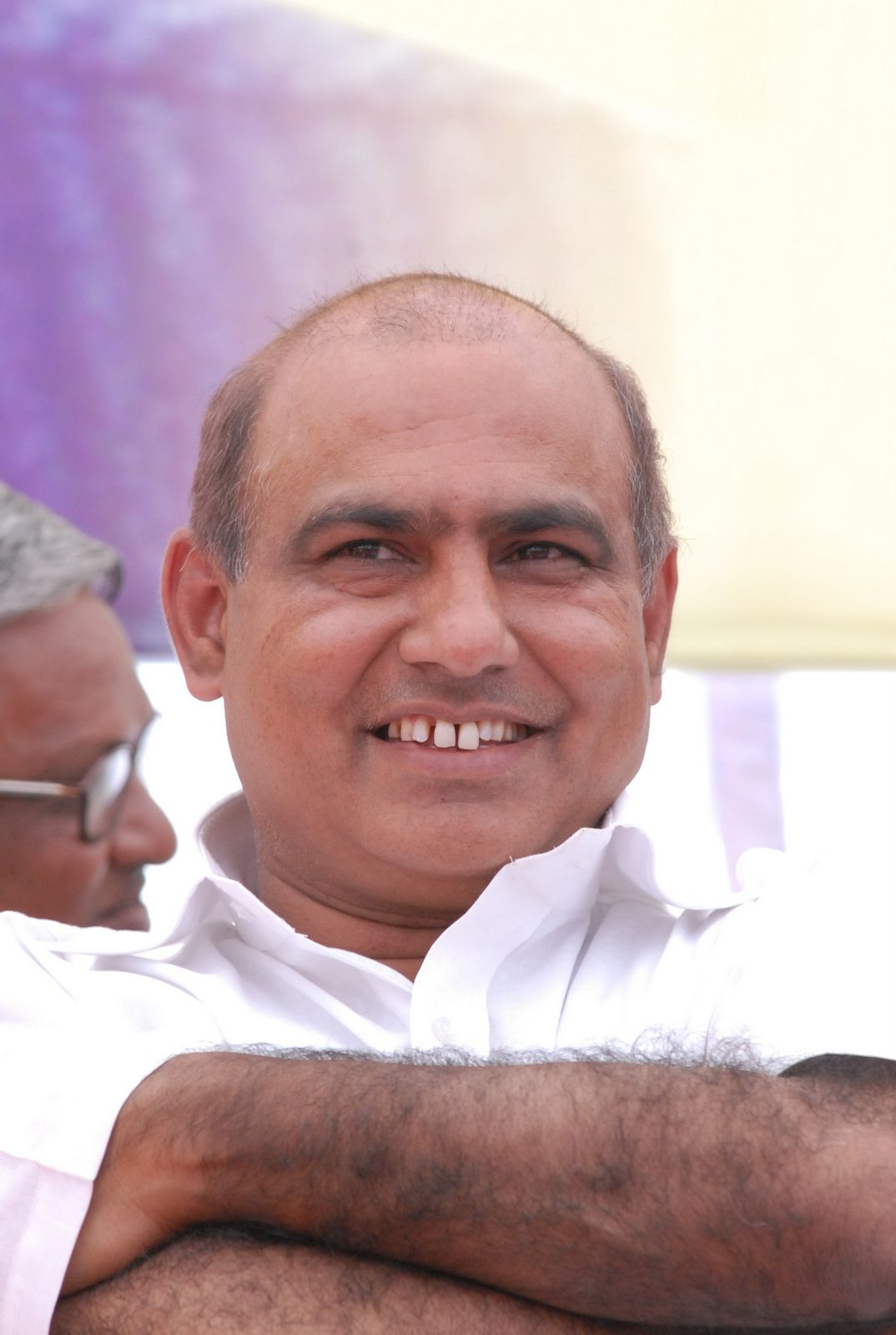
- Incumbent Hemant Khandelwal
- Party: Bharatiya Janata Party
- Elected year: 2023
- Preceded by: Nilay Vinod Daga

Betul Assembly constituency is one of the 230 Vidhan Sabha (Legislative Assembly) constituencies of Madhya Pradesh state in central India.

== Members of Legislative Assembly ==
Elections and Representatives
Election	Name	Party
1952	Deepchand Gothi	Indian National Congress
1957	Deepchand Gothi	Indian National Congress
1957	Mokham Singh	Indian National Congress
1962	Deepchand Gothi	Indian National Congress
1967	G. Khandelwal	Bharatiya Jana Sangh
1972	Maruti Narayanrao	Indian National Congress
1977	Madhav Gopal Naseri	Independent politician
1980	Madhav Gopal Naseri	Bharatiya Janata Party
1985	Ashok Sable	Indian National Congress
1990	Bhagwat Patel	Bharatiya Janata Party
1993	Ashok Sable	Indian National Congress
1998	Vinod Daga	Indian National Congress
2003	Shiv Prasad Rathore	Bharatiya Janata Party
2008	Alkesh Arya	Bharatiya Janata Party
2013	Hemant Khandelwal	Bharatiya Janata Party
2018	Nilay Vinod Daga	Indian National Congress
2023	Hemant Khandelwal	Bharatiya Janata Party

== Election results ==
=== 2023 ===
2023 Madhya Pradesh Legislative Assembly election: Betul
Party	Candidate	Votes	%	±%
BJP	Hemant Vijay Khandelwal	109,183	51.85	+11.92
INC	Nilay Vinod Daga	93,650	44.47	−6.97
NOTA	None of the above	3,049	1.45	−1.02
Majority		15,533	7.38	−4.13
Turnout		210,572	82.42	+1.91
BJP gain from INC		Swing		

=== 2018 ===
2018 Madhya Pradesh Legislative Assembly election: Betul
Party	Candidate	Votes	%	±%
INC	Nilay Daga	96,717	51.44	
BJP	Hemant Vijay Khandelwal	75,072	39.93	
Sapaks Party	Lata-Raju Mhaski	3,916	2.08	
BSP	Rakesh Choukikar	2,296	1.22	
NOTA	None of the above	4,635	2.47	
Majority		21,645	11.51	
Turnout		188,005	80.51	
INC gain from		Swing		

== See also ==
- Betul, Madhya Pradesh
- Betul (Lok Sabha constituency)
