= Harda district =

- District of Madhya Pradesh
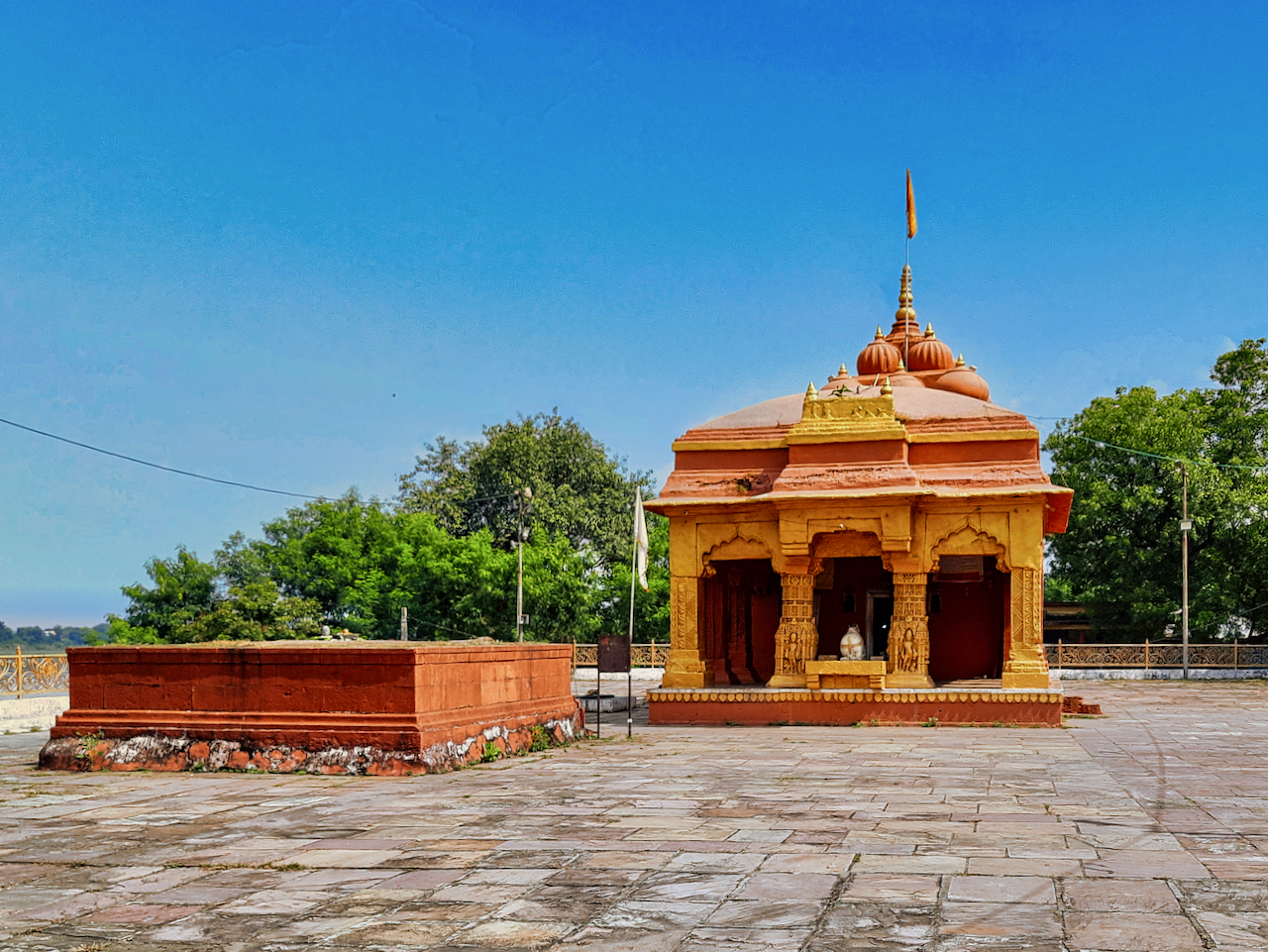
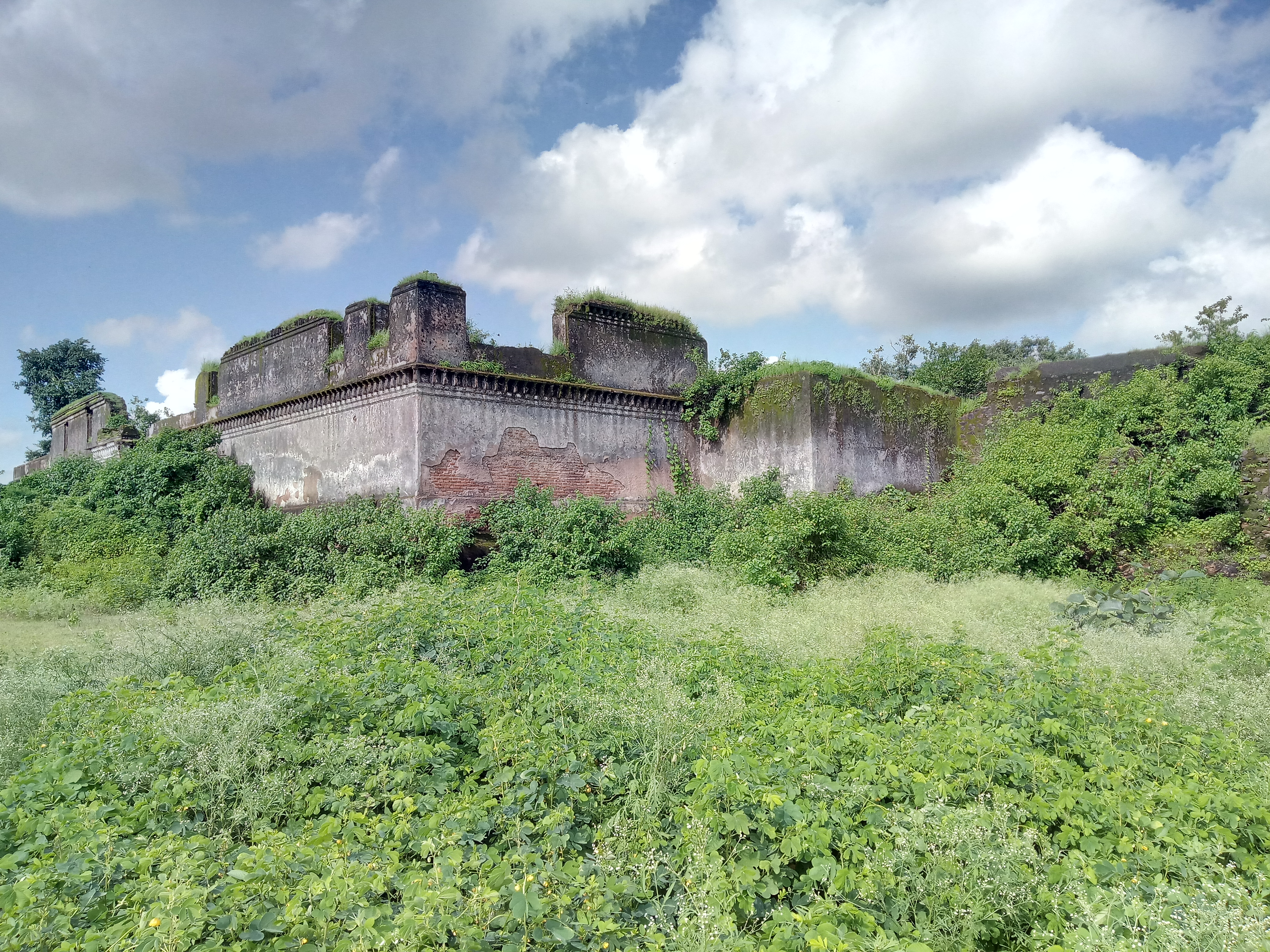
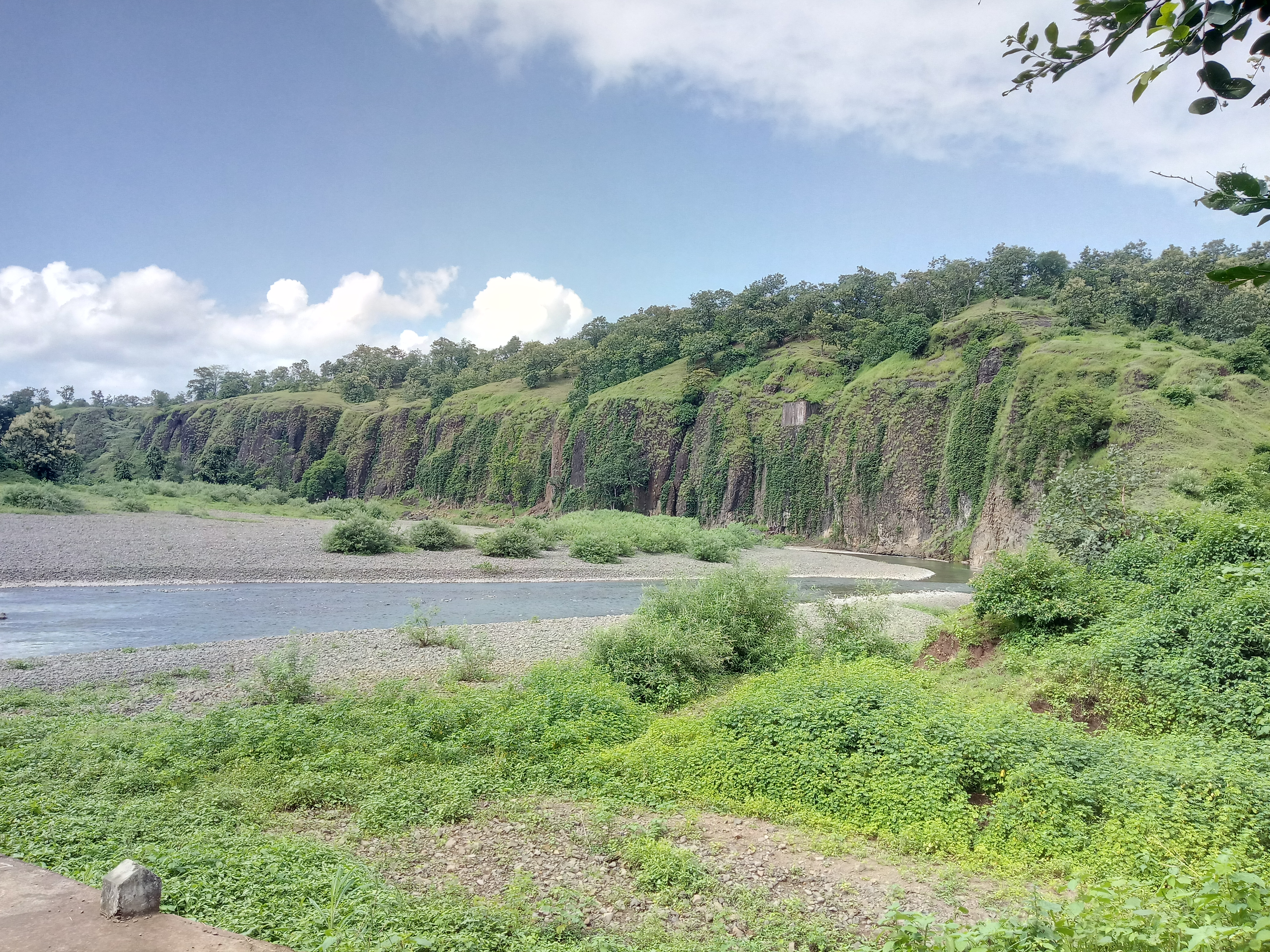
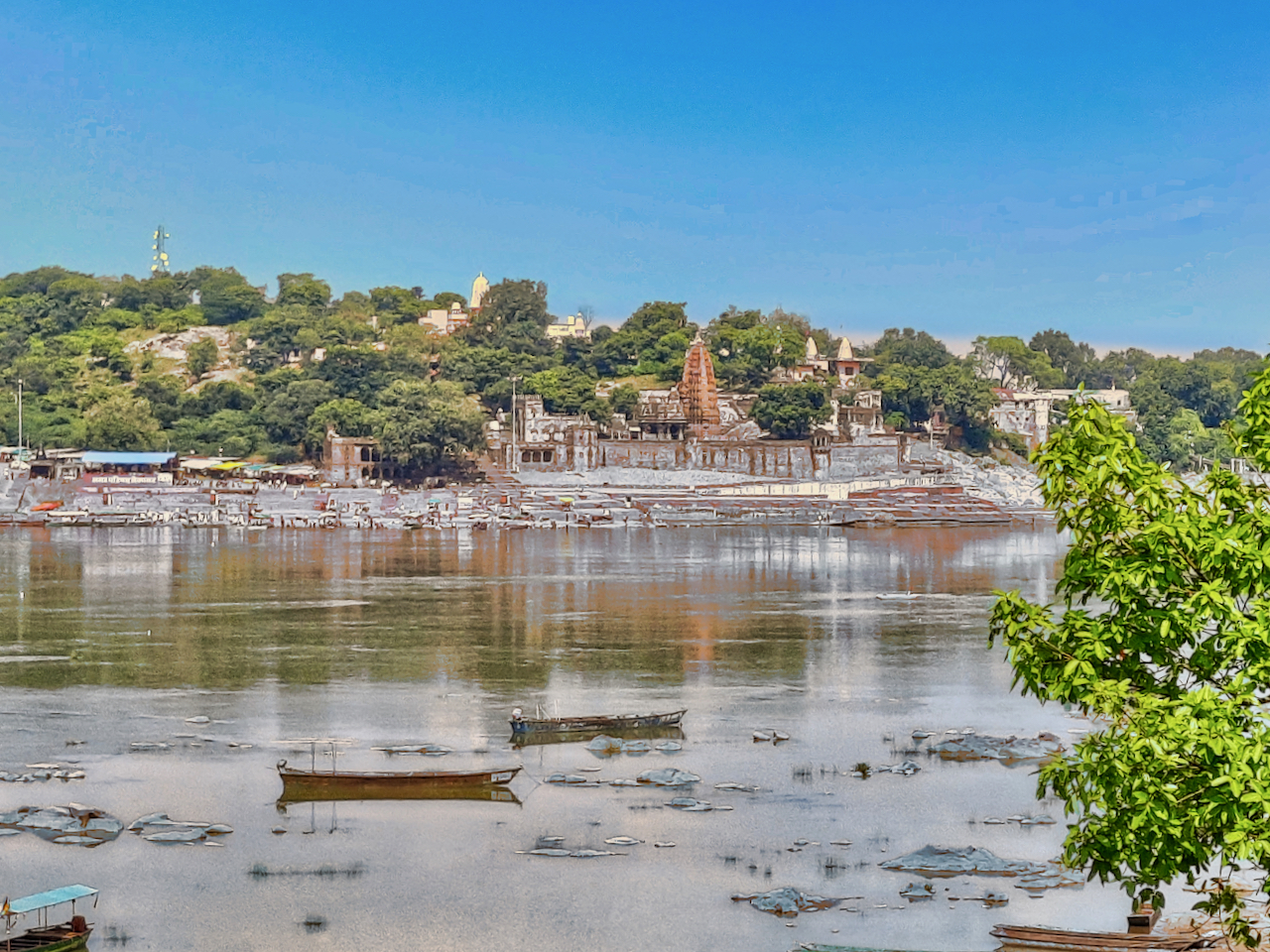
- Top: Ridhanath Riddheshwar Temple, Handia mid: Makrai Fort

- Location of Harda district in Madhya Pradesh
- Coordinates (Harda): 22°20′N 77°05′E
- Country: India
- State: Madhya Pradesh
- Division: Narmadapuram
- Headquarters: Harda
- Tehsils: 6

Government
  - Lok Sabha constituencies: Betul

Area
  - Total: 2,644 km^{2} (1,021 sq mi)

Population (2011)
  - Total: 570,465
  - Density: 215.8/km^{2} (558.8/sq mi)

Demographics
  - Literacy: 74.04 per cent
  - Sex ratio: 932
- Time zone: UTC+05:30 (IST)
- Website: harda.nic.in

Harda district (Hindi pronunciation: [ɦəɾd̪aː]) is a district of Madhya Pradesh state of central India. The town of Harda is the district headquarters. The district is part of Narmadapuram Division. Harda district was organized in 1998. Harda is also known as 'Hridaynagari' (Also "BHuana: Fertile Land").

The movies Ammaa Ki Boli, Matrubhoomi, which deals with the consequences of female infanticide, was filmed in the Ranhai Kala of this district.

One of the youngest freedom movement participant from central India Guru Radha Kishan was born in 1925 in BID village of the district. Guru Radha Kishan openly challenged a British Police Official and slapped him in front of a large gathering while the officer started abusing Indians in a freedom movement rally in Indore. A widely respected Swatantrata Sangram Senani known for his integrity, honesty and transparency. He fought valiantly for the economic deprivation for the poor and underprivileged classes of society.

As of 2011 it is the least populous district of Madhya Pradesh (out of 50).

== Geography ==
The district has an area 2644 km^{2}, and a population 570,465 (2011 census), a 20.25% increase from 2001. Harda District is bounded by the districts of Sehore to the north, Narmadapuram to the northeast, Betul to the southeast, Khandwa to Narmadapuram District. It is part of the Narmadapuram Division of Madhya Pradesh.

Harda lies in the Narmada River valley, and the Narmada forms the district's northern boundary. The land rises towards the Satpura Range to the south.

== Demographics ==
Historical population
| Year | Pop. | ±% p.a. |
|---|---|---|
| 1901 | 132,349 | — |
| 1911 | 135,977 | +0.27% |
| 1921 | 132,067 | −0.29% |
| 1931 | 144,560 | +0.91% |
| 1941 | 144,806 | +0.02% |
| 1951 | 146,513 | +0.12% |
| 1961 | 187,140 | +2.48% |
| 1971 | 240,435 | +2.54% |
| 1981 | 294,835 | +2.06% |
| 1991 | 380,762 | +2.59% |
| 2001 | 474,416 | +2.22% |
| 2011 | 570,465 | +1.86% |

According to the 2011 census Harda District has a population of 570,465, roughly equal to the nation of Solomon Islands or the US state of Wyoming. This gives it a ranking of 534th in India (out of a total of 640). The district has a population density of 171 inhabitants per square kilometre (440/sq mi) . Its population growth rate over the decade 2001-2011 was 20.25%. Harda has a sex ratio of 932 females for every 1000 males, and a literacy rate of 74.04%. 20.92% of the population lives in urban areas. Scheduled Castes and Scheduled Tribes made up 16.28% and 27.99% of the population respectively.

Religions in Harda district (2011)
| Religion | Percent |
| Hinduism | 92.46% |
| Islam | 6.77% |
| Other or not stated | 0.77% |

Hindus are 92.46% and Muslims are 6.77% of the population.

Languages of Harda district (2011)
1. Hindi (89.9%)
2. Korku (6.52%)
3. Gondi (1.76%)
4. Others (1.84%)

At the time of the 2011 Census of India, 89.88% of the population in the district spoke Hindi, 6.52% Korku and 1.76% Gondi as their first language.

== Government and politics ==
Harda (district) has two assembly seats in the Madhya Pradesh Legislative Assembly: Harda (Harda, Khirkiya) and Timarni (Timarni, Sirali). As of 2023, the MLA from Harda is Dr. Ramkishore Dogne and Abhijeet Shah Makdai is the MLA from Timarni.

== Subdivision and Municipality ==
- Harda District is divided in 3 Janpad Panchayat, Harda, Timarni, and Khirkiya.
- District Divided into 6 tehsil's -
1. Harda
2. Timarni
3. Khirkiya
4. Sirali
5. Rahatgaon
6. Handia
- 4 Municipality are in the District -
1. Harda
2. Timarni
3. Khirkiya
4. Sirali

== Tourist places ==
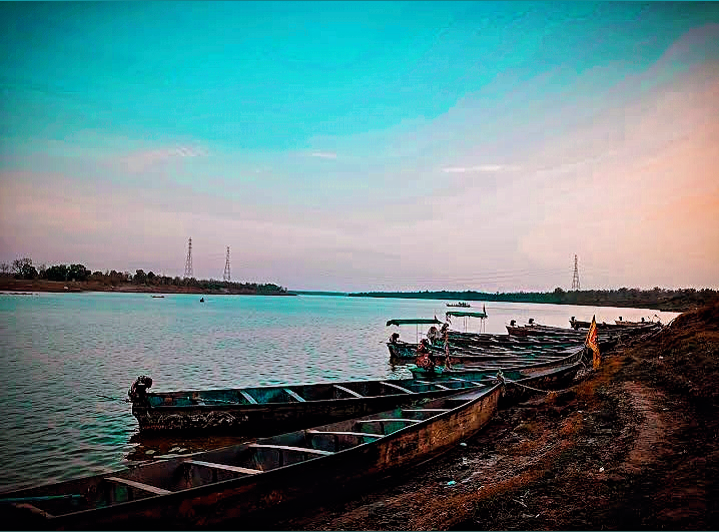
Joga Fort And Narmada River

- Joga Fort : This fort is built on an island in the middle of the Narmada river in Joga village, 45 km from Harda. Its beauty and the river Narmada are worth seeing.
- Handia - Riddheshwar Mandir, Narmada Ghat
- Makrai - Historical place and Fort

== See also ==
- Sirali
- Khirkiya
- Rahatgaon
- Timarni
- Handia
- Pandharmati
- Sodalpur
