= Vijay Kumar Khandelwal =

Indian politician

Member of Parliament, Lok Sabha
- In office (1996-1998), (1998-1999), (1999-2004), (2004 – 2008
- Preceded by: Aslam Sher Khan
- Succeeded by: Hemant Khandelwal
- Constituency: Betul

Personal details
- Born: 22 April 1936 Betul, Central Provinces and Berar, British India
- Died: 12 November 2007 (aged 71) Nagpur, Maharashtra, India
- Party: BJP
- Spouse: Kanti Khandelwal
- Children: 2 sons and 1 daughter
- As of 22 September, 2006

Vijay Kumar Khandelwal (22 April 1936 – 12 November 2007) was a member of the 14th Lok Sabha of India. He represented the Betul constituency of Madhya Pradesh and was a member of the Bharatiya Janata Party (BJP) political party.

He was also member of 11th 12th and 13th Lok Sabha from Betul.

He died before his wife Mrs Kanti, 1 daughter and two sons, one being Hemant Khandelwal who became MP from Betul in by-elections after his death.
