= Mulla Do-Piyaza =

Advisor and Vizier of the Mughal emperor Akbar

Do-Piyaza
- Born: Muhammad Al Abdul Momin; 1527, Mughal Empire
- Died: 1620 (aged 92–93) , Malwa Subah, Mughal Empire
- Wives: Sri Rani Momin; Naiza Begum or Faizaah
- Father: Atgah Khan
- Mother: Jiji Anga
- Religion: Orthodox Islam or Din-i Ilahi
- Occupation: Advisor and Vizier in Akbar's court

Mulla Do Piyaza (1527-1620) was supposedly the Advisor and Vizier of the Mughal emperor Akbar. Mulla Do-Piyaza, also portrayed as witty, was Birbal's rival. Even though these folk tales originated at the end of Akbar's reign (1556–1605), Mulla Do-Piyaza began to appear much later. Most scholars consider him to be completely fictional.

== Background ==
There is no historical proof of his existence. There are some sources which tell that Do-Piaza was born as Muhammad Al Abdul Momin to Atgah Khan, the commander of Mughals and to Jiji Anga, a wet nurse. He was given the honorific Mullah for his witty purpose. He served as the vizier of Akbar's Empire. In the folk tales, Mulla Do-Piyaza is depicted as Birbal's Muslim counterpart and as a proponent of orthodox Islam. Most of the time he is shown getting the better of both Birbal and Akbar, but there are other stories which portray him in a negative light.

No Mughal-era records mention any courtier called Mulla Do-Piyaza, and pamphlets on his life and jokes were published only in the late 19th century. One modern scholar, Hafiz Mahmood Shirani, states that Mulla Do-Piyaza was a historical personality whose original name was Abdul Momin, and who was born in India, left for Iran in 1582, returned after 36 years, died in 1620, and was buried in Handia. The manuscripts which mention him date back to an author who died in 1532—years before Akbar was born. According to C. M. Naim, Shirani's character is fictional and based on Persian folklore unrelated to Akbar. Mulla Do-Piaza is also told that he was chef in his past life and had mistakenly created the legendary dish Dopiaza. As per his name suggest, he might be a librarian or a Mulla (cleric) but as per Mughal folklore, and most sources he is known to be vizier of Akbar era. A local legend narrates that upon seeing Birbal's impressive pagdi(turban), Do-piyaza became envious and approached his wife. This anecdote is often cited as evidence that Mullah Do-Piyaza must have been married.

== See also ==
- Dopiaza
