= Durga Das Uikey =

Indian politician from Madhya Pradesh

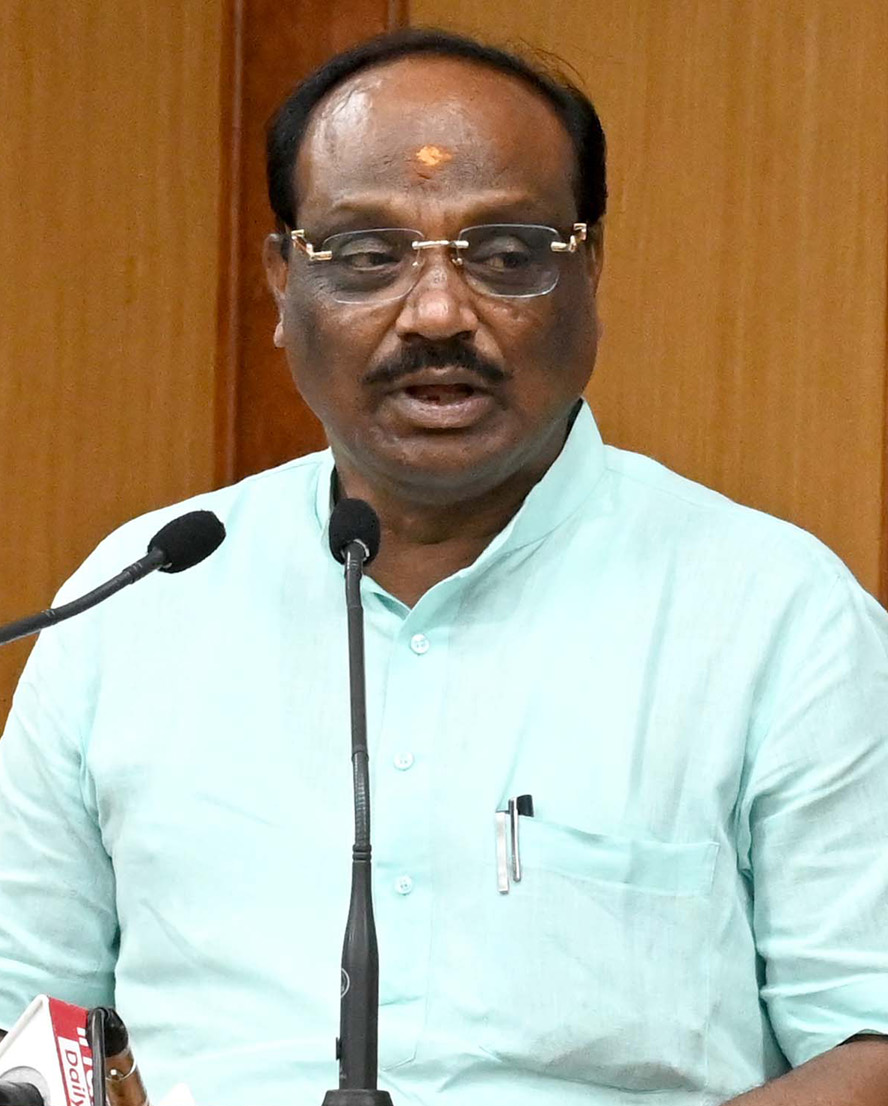
- Uikey in 2024

Minister of State in Ministry of Tribal Affairs
- Incumbent
- Assumed office 11 June 2024
- Prime Minister: Narendra Modi
- Minister: Jual Oram
- Preceded by: Bharati Pawar

Member of Parliament, Lok Sabha
- Incumbent
- Assumed office 23 May 2019
- Preceded by: Jyoti Dhurve
- Constituency: Betul

Personal details
- Born: 29 October 1963 (age 62) Mirapur, Madhya Pradesh, India
- Party: Bharatiya Janata Party
- Spouse: Mamta Uikey
- Profession: Politician, Educator

Durga Das Uikey (born 29 October 1963; Hindi pronunciation: [d̪ʊɾgaː d̪aːs ʊɪkeː]), also known as DD Uikey, is an Indian politician, educator, and social advocate. He is the incumbent Member of Parliament from Betul in Madhya Pradesh and serves as Minister of State in the Ministry of Tribal Affairs since 2024. A member of the Bharatiya Janata Party (BJP), Uikey is known for his focus on tribal development, education, and grassroots governance.

== Early life and education ==
Durga Das Uikey was born on 29 October 1963 in Mirapur, Madhya Pradesh, to a family of local educators and social workers. He completed his schooling in Betul and earned a degree in Education before beginning his professional career as a teacher. His early engagement in community education and literacy programs brought him local recognition and laid the foundation for his political career.

== Political career ==
=== Entry into politics ===
Uikey joined the Bharatiya Janata Party (BJP) in the early 2000s and worked at the grassroots level, focusing on tribal welfare, rural education, and local governance. His work in community development, particularly in Betul district, earned him popularity among constituents and tribal communities.

=== Member of Parliament ===
In the 2019 Indian general election, Uikey was elected to the Lok Sabha representing Betul. He won the election with a comfortable margin, defeating his nearest competitor from the Indian National Congress (INC).

In the 2024 Indian general election, Uikey was re-elected, securing a margin of 379,761 votes over INC candidate Ramu Tekam.

=== Minister of State ===
On 11 June 2024, Uikey was appointed Minister of State in the Ministry of Tribal Affairs under Prime Minister Narendra Modi, succeeding Bharati Pawar. In this role, he has focused on policies related to tribal education, livelihood programs, and socio-economic development initiatives for marginalized communities.

== Legislative initiatives ==
During his tenure in the Lok Sabha, Uikey has actively participated in debates and parliamentary committees concerning education, tribal welfare, rural development, and healthcare. He has introduced and supported several bills aimed at improving access to primary education and strengthening local governance structures in tribal areas.

== Social work and advocacy ==
Even before his election, Uikey was involved in promoting literacy, women's empowerment, and health awareness programs in Betul district. He continues to engage with NGOs and community organisations to facilitate development projects and capacity-building initiatives for tribal communities.

== Personal life ==
Durga Das Uikey is married to Mamta Uikey and resides in Betul, Madhya Pradesh. He is fluent in Hindi and regional tribal languages and maintains active engagement with his constituency through regular visits and public outreach programs.

== Recognition ==
Uikey's contributions to education and tribal development have been recognised by local civic organisations and educational bodies. He is cited as an example of a politician combining legislative work with grassroots social initiatives.

== See also ==
- Betul (Lok Sabha constituency)
- Bharatiya Janata Party
- Ministry of Tribal Affairs (India)
- List of members of the 17th Lok Sabha

== Political career ==
=== Lok Sabha elections ===
Uikey was elected to the Lok Sabha, the lower house of the Parliament of India, from Betul in the 2019 Indian general election as a candidate of the Bharatiya Janata Party.

In the 2024 Lok Sabha election, he won by a margin of 379,761 votes, defeating the Indian National Congress candidate Ramu Tekam.

=== Ministerial role ===
On 11 June 2024, Uikey was appointed Minister of State in the Ministry of Tribal Affairs under Prime Minister Narendra Modi. He succeeded Bharati Pawar in the post and continues to serve in the current government.

== Personal life ==
Durga Das Uikey is married to Mamta Uikey. He resides in Betul, Madhya Pradesh.

== See also ==
- Betul (Lok Sabha constituency)
- Bharatiya Janata Party
- Ministry of Tribal Affairs (India)

== See also ==
- Third Modi ministry
