= Alkesh Arya =

Indian politician

Alkesh Arya is an Indian politician and member of the Bharatiya Janata Party. Arya is a member of the Madhya Pradesh Legislative Assembly from the Betul constituency in Betul district.
