= Makrai =

- village
- Location in Madhya Pradesh, India Makrai (India)
- Coordinates: 22°20′18″N 77°20′35″E
- Country: India
- State: Madhya Pradesh
- District: Harda

Languages
  - Official: Hindi
- Time zone: UTC+5:30 (IST)
- Vehicle registration: MP-
- Nearest city: Harda, District headquarters

Makrai is a village in the Harda district of Madhya Pradesh, India. The village was the headquarters of the Makrai princely state during the British Raj.

== History ==
According to legend the Makrai princely state was established in 1663 by Raj Gond Raja Karkat Rai in the 16th century. It later came under the administrative authority of the Central India Agency until 1933, when it was transferred to the Bhopal Agency subdivision of the Central India Agency in 1933 from the Central Provinces and Berar. In 1892, it covered an area of 401 square kilometres (155 sq mi) and had a population of 16,784. The state's rulers were of Rajput lineage and bore the title Maharaja.

After Indian independence in 1947, the rulers of Makrai acceded to the Union of India, and the principality was incorporated into the state of Madhya Pradesh, which in turn was created from the former Central Provinces and Berar.

As of 2012, the titular Maharaja of Makrai is Raja Ajay Shah, born on 21 January 1956, married on 20 May 1986 and crowned on 21 December 1987.

== Culture ==
Makrai stands on a hill near the Sayani River and is noted for its dense forests. One well-known location is Nagjhiri and Devjhiri, a small natural well in the bank of the river through which water flows throughout the year. Other notable places include Mankameshwar Mahadev situated in a cave, Sule Baba Ki Tekri or the Hill Of Sule Baba is known for its tribal God and is the highest, coolest place in Makrai, the Bunred Palace (Mahal), Kaidi Ki Babdi, from where prisoners carry water from the river to the top of hill to supply the state. Here, Nathji used to worship the gods Bhilat Dev and Shiv Ji.

There were two noted melas, where villagers and local tribes gathered to celebrate Shivratri and the eve of Holi. Another well-known mela, the month-long Bhilat Dev is organised every year near Sirali in Malapur. Before the mela starts, the Nathji (Pandit) go barefoot and carry tippara (made from bamboo and used to keep the cloth of God) on their heads from Khudia (the new provincial Village) to the Tapti River Bank Betul district - a distance of about 200 kilometres (120 mi), to wash their worshipping cloths then return the same way over a fixed period of seven days. In a tradition that has existed for hundreds of years, during the journey people from the villages wait for the tippara on a fixed day and thereafter organize a mela.
