= Timarni =

Timarni Timboornee
- Nagar Parishad
- Location in Madhya Pradesh, India Timarni (India)
- Coordinates: 22°22′12″N 77°13′31″E
- Country: India
- State: Madhya Pradesh
- District: Harda

Population (2011)
  - Total: 22,359

Languages
  - Official: Hindi
- Time zone: UTC+5:30 (IST)
- PIN: 461228

Timarni is a town and a Nagar panchayat in Harda district in the Indian state of Madhya Pradesh.

== Demographics ==
As of the 2011 Census of India, 22,359 of which 11,562 are males while 10,797 are females. It has an average literacy rate of 73%, higher than the national average of 64%: male literacy is 81%, and female literacy is 64%. 14% of the Timarni population is under 6 years of age. The female:male sex ratio is 934:100, greater than the state average of 931:1000.

Religion in Timarni
Religion	Percent
Hindus	90.70%
Muslims	8.15%
Jains	.60%
Others†	.25%
Christians	.25%
Distribution of religions †Includes Sikhs (.25%), Buddhists (<0%).

== Education ==
It has two colleges. Well-known school Saraswati Shishu mandir and Radhasosami High School are among the largest schools there.

== Origin of name ==
The name likely came from the Timran River. Alternatively, it may relate to timber (wood).

== Governance ==
Timarni town is administrated by Timarni Nagar Panchayat. It consist of 15 wards. Timarni became Tehsil headquarters in 1984, Nagar Panchayat in year 1957 and Nagar Parishad on 2 May 2011.

In the 2022 election, Shri Devendra Kumar Bharadwaj became the President.

Nagar Parishad Timarni has six main departments, each focusing on a specific sector: Tax, Construction, Sanitation, Animal Care, Registration, and Water.

== Transport ==
=== Road ===
National Highway 47 (earlier NH 59A) passes through Timarni. It is a junction point between Indore and Nagpur and well connected by road and train from the state capital, Bhopal and which is about 148 km away from it.

=== Rail ===
Many major trains serve Timarni.

== Economy ==
The timber depot is one of the largest depots of wood in Madhya Pradesh. It is known for its huge production of wheat and soybeans.
