= Ram Kishore Dogne =

Indian politician

Member of the Madhya Pradesh Legislative Assembly
- Incumbent
- Assumed office 2023
- Preceded by: Kamal Patel
- Constituency: Harda
- In office 2013–2018
- Succeeded by: Kamal Patel
- Constituency: Harda

Personal details
- Born: 16 March 1965 (age 61) Hoshangabad
- Party: Indian National Congress
- Spouse: Rajni Dogne
- Education: M.Phill, PhD,
- Alma mater: Devi Ahilya Vishwavidyalaya
- Profession: Politician

Ram Kishore Dogne is an Indian politician and a member of the Indian National Congress party.

== Political career ==
He became an MLA in 2013.

Recently, he had reached the MP Vidhan Sabha half-naked, protesting against the water crisis caused by the government in his constituency Harda, because of not releasing water from the dam.

== Political views ==
He supports Congress Party's ideology.

== Personal life ==
He is married to Rajni Dogne. They have two children.

== See also ==
- Madhya Pradesh Legislative Assembly
- 2013 Madhya Pradesh Legislative Assembly election
- 2008 Madhya Pradesh Legislative Assembly election
