= Harda =

Harda Hardah
- City
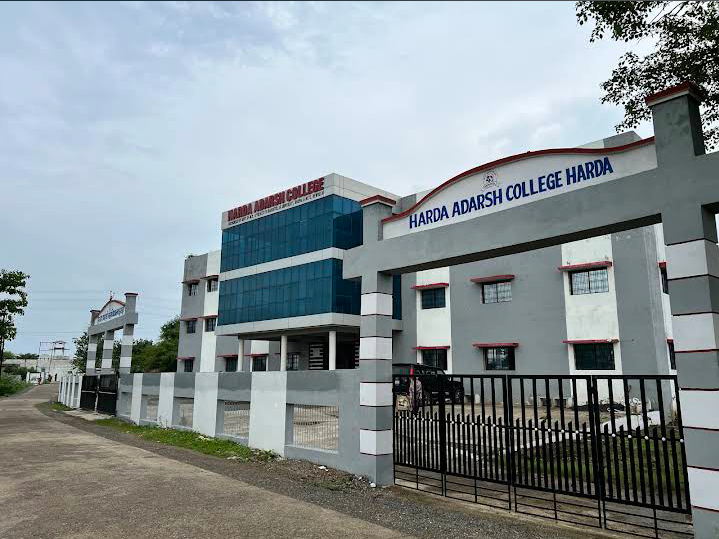
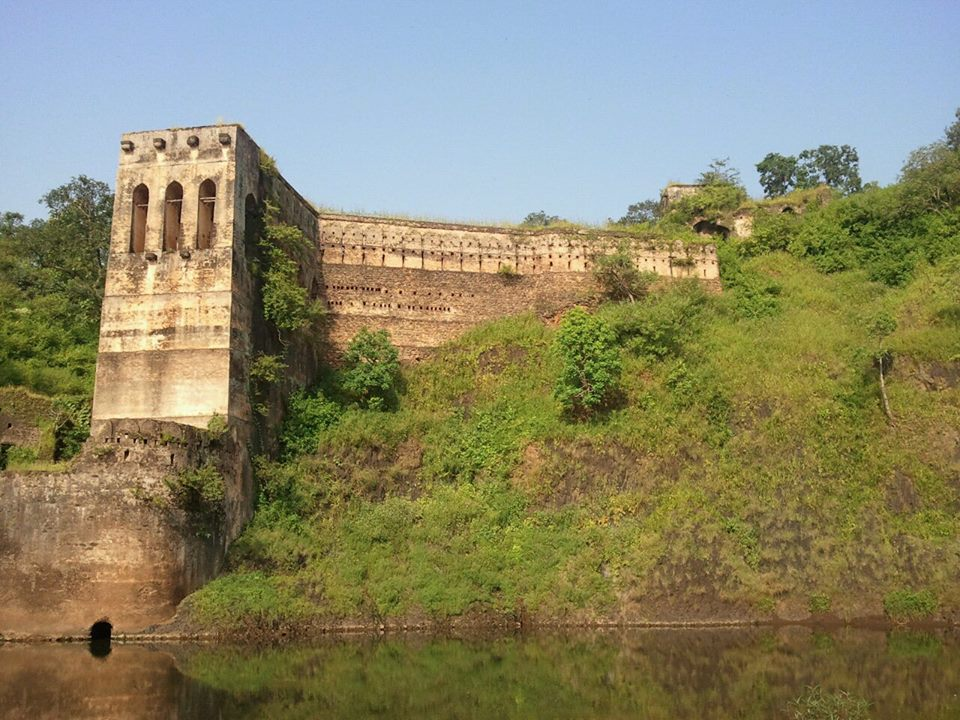
- Top: Makrai Fort; Bottom: A College In Harda

- Location within Madhya Pradesh
- Coordinates: 22°20′53.742″N 77°5′35.058″E
- Country: India
- State: Madhya Pradesh
- District: Harda

Government
  - Type: Mayor-Council Government
  - Body: Mayor, Harda Municipal Corporation

Area
  - Total: 200 km^{2} (77 sq mi)
  - Rank: 11
- Elevation: 296 m (971 ft)

Population (2021)
  - Total: 370,625
  - Rank: 15
  - Density: 1,900/km^{2} (4,800/sq mi)

Language
  - Official: Hindi
- Time zone: UTC+5:30 (IST)
- PIN: 461331-461228
- Telephone code: +91-07577 / 07572
- Vehicle registration: MP-47
- Website: harda.nic.in

Harda is a city and a municipality in Harda district in the Indian state of Madhya Pradesh. Harda is the administrative headquarters of Harda district.

== History ==
=== Mughal period ===
During the Mughal period, Harda was a mahal in the Handia sarkar. In 1742, Marathas led by Peshwa Balaji Baji Rao captured the area and displaced the Muslim governor of the Handia sarkar. Subsequently, Harda replaced Handia as the most important town in the area, as the local Maratha amil (chief) resided at Harda. Harda was a part of the Scindia's territories. In 1801, Yashwantrao Holkar sacked Harda. Later, Harda also faced attacks from the Pindaris and the Korku tribals.

=== British period ===
In 1817, during the Third Anglo-Maratha War, Harda became the headquarters of John Malcolm's division. Even after the Maratha defeat in the war, the Scindias retained control of the Harda-Handia tract. The area was ceded to the British in 1844, but the cession was completed only in 1860. The town saw disturbances during the 1857 uprising. The Deputy Magistrate, Maulvi Mazhar-ul-Jamil, helped curb the rebellion and was rewarded with a jagir in the Damoh district. The Harda Nagar Palika was established on 18 May 1867, and the Harda tehsil was created in 1913.

The British tried to bring a progressive framework to Harda during its rule. Harda was formed by combining Kul Harda and Mehmudabad Villages. After the railway lines were laid, the conditions improved, and the area developed. In 1857, British officers worked here as judges and administrative officers. Harda was one of the largest places in the old 'Madhya Prant' and includes area of 'Seoni Malwa.' The Harda language and culture is influenced by 'Malwa' and 'Nimar'. The main dialect spoken in Harda is known as Bhuani, and the region is known as the Bhuana area which loosely translates to more fertilized land.

== Indian independence movement ==
Several political and social activists from the Harda region participated in the Indian independence movement during the early 20th century. Political activities in the region increased after the Partition of Bengal in 1905.

Bhagwantrao Annabhau Mandloi, who later served as the Chief Minister of Madhya Pradesh, was associated with the region and participated in the Indian independence movement.

Mahesh Dutt Mishra of Harda participated in the freedom movement and was imprisoned during the Quit India Movement. According to records published under the Government of India's Azadi Ka Amrit Mahotsav initiative, he worked with Mahatma Gandhi during 1941–42.

== Geography ==
Harda is located at 22.33°N 77.1°E. It has an average elevation of 296 metres.

== Climate ==
Climate data for Harda, Madhya Pradesh (1981–2010, extremes 1948–2012)
Month	Jan	Feb	Mar	Apr	May	Jun	Jul	Aug	Sep	Oct	Nov	Dec	Year
Record high °C (°F)	34.9 (94.8)	37.8 (100.0)	42.3 (108.1)	43.7 (110.7)	48.0 (118.4)	44.5 (112.1)	38.6 (101.5)	33.6 (92.5)	35.5 (95.9)	36.8 (98.2)	35.0 (95.0)	32.7 (90.9)	48.0 (118.4)
Mean daily maximum °C (°F)	27.4 (81.3)	30.1 (86.2)	34.6 (94.3)	38.7 (101.7)	40.3 (104.5)	35.7 (96.3)	29.2 (84.6)	27.6 (81.7)	29.8 (85.6)	31.1 (88.0)	29.1 (84.4)	27.8 (82.0)	31.8 (89.2)
Mean daily minimum °C (°F)	10.5 (50.9)	11.9 (53.4)	16.1 (61.0)	20.6 (69.1)	24.7 (76.5)	24.4 (75.9)	22.5 (72.5)	21.8 (71.2)	21.1 (70.0)	17.3 (63.1)	13.4 (56.1)	10.2 (50.4)	17.9 (64.2)
Record low °C (°F)	−0.2 (31.6)	0 (32)	2.3 (36.1)	10.6 (51.1)	16.6 (61.9)	14.9 (58.8)	14.5 (58.1)	13.1 (55.6)	10.5 (50.9)	5.0 (41.0)	2.6 (36.7)	−1 (30)	−0.2 (31.6)
Average rainfall mm (inches)	13.8 (0.54)	14.2 (0.56)	19.7 (0.78)	6.9 (0.27)	13.3 (0.52)	144.5 (5.69)	330.1 (13.00)	371.7 (14.63)	189.8 (7.47)	57.8 (2.28)	20.6 (0.81)	8.6 (0.34)	1,191 (46.89)
Average rainy days	1.1	1.5	1.4	0.7	0.9	8.0	15.2	15.5	8.8	3.2	1.7	0.8	58.7
Average relative humidity (%) (at 17:30 IST)	44	34	25	20	24	53	77	84	74	60	52	47	50
Source: India Meteorological Department

=== Flora and fauna ===
The southern hill regions of Harda are home to tribal, 'Gond' and 'Korku' people. The south region of Harda was under 'Makdae' rule and the 'Gond' king was the ruler. The 'Bichhola' village of harda was the developed 'Rajaswa' centre in the Mughal empire. The area which was called 'Gondwana' became non-tribal (it is still tribal because there is a vast tribal population) during the British rule, as the workers, administration officials, farmers and business community were in touch with the states like Maharashtra, Rajasthan, Uttar Pradesh and Gujarat for 150 years the area got influenced by the culture of these states.

== Demographics ==
As of the 2011 Indian Census, Harda had a total population of 68,162, of which 34,970 were males and 33,192 were females. Population within the age group of 0 to 6 years was 8,205. The total number of literates in Harda was 52,771, which constituted 77.4% of the population with male literacy of 80.9% and female literacy of 73.7%. The effective literacy rate of the 7+ population of Harda was 88.0%, with a male literacy rate of 92.3% and a female literacy rate of 83.5%. The Scheduled Castes and Scheduled Tribes population was 8,758 and 2,390 respectively. Harda had 13493 households in 2011.

As of 2001 India census, Harda had a population of 61,712. Males constitute 52% of the population and females 49%. Harda has an average literacy rate of 73.6%, male literacy is 79.7%, and female literacy is 66.7%. In Harda, 14% of the population is under 6 years of age. , Harda had a total population of 1,66,625,

== Government and politics ==
=== Civic administration ===
On 18 May 1867, the British established the 'Nagar Palika' in Harda, and from 1920 the work was done in a republican manner. The underground drainage in Harda is the best example of British architecture. For administration purposes, Tahsil Harda was established in the year 1913. Harda was the headquarters of a tehsil in the Hoshangabad district. The Harda district was created in 1998.

=== Politics ===
Harda has an assembly seat in the Madhya Pradesh Legislative Assembly with the same name, that is Harda and the MLA was Dr. Ram Kishore Dogne from the Congress.

== Education ==
Harda district has various government and private educational institutions. Higher education in the district is provided by colleges affiliated with Barkatullah University and other state institutions. Major educational institutions in the district include Government PG College, Harda, Government Polytechnic College, Harda, and Jawahar Navodaya Vidyalaya, Harda, located at Charuwa near Khirkiya.

== Transport ==
=== Roadways ===
Harda city is well connected through road routes that connect various major cities of Madhya Pradesh and other states. Harda is located on Nagpur – Indore National Highway on National Highway 47 (India). Political capital Bhopal and financial capital Indore are about 165 km and 150 km from Harda respectively.

The Chief Minister of Madhya Pradesh recently laid the foundation stone for the following road widening projects in Harda:-

1. 40 km of road widening work from Harda to Betul as four lane route located in (Chicholi-Betul) highway route in Nh-47 with cost of Rs 620 crores.
2. 30 km of road widening work from Harda to Betul as four lane route located in (Harda - Temagaon) highway route in NH-47 with cost Rs 555 crores.
3. 47 km of road widening work from Indore - Harda as four lane route located in (Namasa - Pidgaon) highway route in NH-47 with cost Rs 867 crores.

=== Railways ===
Harda railway station comes under the Western Central Railway is connected by major route from Mumbai to Delhi and Mumbai to Allahabad. Station Code is HD. The station has three platforms with all amenities available. It also has connectivity with Nagpur and also with Indore via Khandwa. The nearest railway junction is Itarsi which is 76 km from Harda.

=== Airways ===
Harda does not have an airport, with the nearest airports being Raja Bhoj Airport Bhopal and Devi Ahilya Bai Holkar Airport Indore, both of which are located about 175 km from Harda.

== Tourist attractions ==
- Handia: It is a famous pilgrimage spot and a sacred place situated around 20 km from Harda. The Narmada River flows and consists nabhi kund (centre of river Narmada). There are also many temples dedicated to Lord Shiva, out of which the famous temple built by Pandavas is also situated here. According to beliefs it was built during the Mahabharat era in a single night (6 months).
- Teli Ki Sarai - About 16 km from Harda in Handia, this structure was created in the 16-17th century by a banker for his customers to rest overnight. Historic records show that this was also used as a military cantonment.

== Krishi upaj Mandi Harda ==
- Harda Mandi is one of the big mandis of Madhya Pradesh, where mainly crops like moong, gram, tur, wheat, urad, maize, soybean, mustard etc. are auctioned. Harda mandi is the biggest mandi of the district. From here the daily prices of grains and vegetables being bought and sold in Harda Mandi can be seen. Special care is taken of cleanliness in Harda Mandi, so that the farmers who come daily do not face any kind of problem and they can get a clean mandi yard.
