= Khirkiya =

- Nagar Panchayat City
- Location in Madhya Pradesh, India Khirkiya (India)
- Coordinates: 22°10′0″N 76°51′42″E
- Country: India
- State: Madhya Pradesh
- District: Harda

Population (2011)
  - Total: 22,737

Languages
  - Official: Hindi
- Time zone: UTC+5:30 (IST)
- PIN: 461441
- ISO 3166 code: IN-MP
- Vehicle registration: MP 47
- Sex ratio: Female 937; Male 1000
- Literacy Rate: 80.63%
- Website: www.harda.nic.in

Khirkiya is a town and a nagar panchayat in Harda district in the Indian state of Madhya Pradesh. Khirkiya grain market is one of the biggest grain markets in madhya pradesh and also has record production and selling of grains. Navratri festival of Khirkiya is very famous in all over the country, so many beautiful pandals (the place where Durga statues are placed) are created by samiti (community). In more than a dozen places, Durga statues are established. Even people from different cities come to celebrate the festival.

== Demographics ==
As of the census of 2011, Khirkiya is divided into 15 wards for which elections are held every 5 years. The Khirkiya Nagar Panchayat has a population of 22,737 of which 11,740 are males while 10,997 are female. The population of children aged 0-6 is 3,039 which is 13.37% of total population of Khirkiya (NP). In Khirkiya Nagar Panchayat, female sex ratio is of 937 against the state average of 931. Moreover, the child sex ratio in Khirkiya is around 994 compared to Madhya Pradesh state average of 918.

The literacy rate of Khirkiya is 85.37% higher than the state average of 69.32%. In Khirkiya, male literacy is around 91.76% while the female literacy rate is 78.50%. It has a total of over 4,472 houses to which it supplies basic amenities like water and sewerage. It is also authorized to build roads within Nagar Panchayat limits and impose taxes on properties coming under its jurisdiction.

Religion in Harda
Religion	Percent
Hindus	85.50%
Muslims	10.70%
Jains	2.41%
Others†	1.10%
Christians	.20%
Distribution of religions †Includes Sikhs (1%), Buddhists (<0.1%).

=== Tourism ===
- Gupteshwar shiv temple is just 8 kilometers away from the town.
- Indra sagar backwater and sunset point is only 15 kilometers away from the town.
- Bewar's cave is shiv temple inside cave opens only in shivaratri also nearer to the town.
- Shri sai Dham temple of sai baba also in the town.
- Vithhal temple of kudawa also known as second pandharpur is just 5 kilometers away from the city.
- Jageshwer shiv temple of sangwa mal is also famous spot, its history is hundred years old just 5 kilometers away from the city.
- Gomukh temple of city has kunds (water tank) of narmda river.

== History ==
Khirkiya was formed by the fusion of two villages, Khirkiya and Chipabad, in 1987. Khirkiya also known as Gateway of Nimar because nimad region starts from this town. Indra sagar back water is only 10 kilometers away from town. Khirkiya became major town when Harsud sank due to flooding from Indirasagar Dam.

== Transport ==
=== Rail ===
Khirkiya has a broad gauge railway connectivity on the Itarsi - Khandwa line and falls in the West Central Railway Zone under Bhopal Division of railways.

=== Road ===
- Khirkiya is well connected with khandwa and harda by Hoshangabad khandwa state highway.
- Khirkiya auliya state highway also connects Khirkiya town to chhipawad.
