= 15th Madhya Pradesh Assembly =

←	14th Assembly	16th Assembly	→

Overview
- Legislative body: Madhya Pradesh Legislative Assembly
- Term: 6 January 2019 – 3 December 2023
- Election: 2018 Madhya Pradesh Legislative Assembly election
- Government: Kamal Nath (2018-2020); Chouhan IV (2020-2023)
- Opposition: BJP (2018–2020); INC (2020–2023)
- Members: 230
- Speaker: Girish Gautam
- Leader of the House: Shivraj Singh Chouhan
- Leader of the Opposition: Govind Singh

The Fifteenth Legislative Assembly of Madhya Pradesh constituted after the 2018 Madhya Pradesh Legislative Assembly elections which were concluded in November 2018, with the results being declared on 11 December 2018. The tenure of 14th Madhya Pradesh Assembly ended on 5 January 2023.

== Members of Legislative Assembly ==
No.	Constituency	Name	Party	Remarks
Sheopur District
1	Sheopur	Babu Jandel	Indian National Congress	
2	Vijaypur	Sitaram Aadivashi	Bharatiya Janata Party	
Morena District
3	Sabalgarh	Baijnath Kushwah	Indian National Congress	
4	Joura	Subedar Singh Rajodha	Bharatiya Janata Party	
5	Sumawali	Ajab Singh Kushwah	Indian National Congress	
6	Morena	Rakesh Mavai	Indian National Congress	
7	Dimani	Ravindra Singh Tomar	Indian National Congress	
8	Ambah (SC)	Kamlesh Jatav	Bharatiya Janata Party	
Bhind District
9	Ater	Arvind Singh Bhadoria	Bharatiya Janata Party	
10	Bhind	Sanjeev Singh Kushwaha	Bharatiya Janata Party	Switched from BSP to BJP
11	Lahar	Dr. Govind Singh	Indian National Congress	
12	Mehgaon	O. P. S. Bhadoria	Bharatiya Janata Party	
13	Gohad (SC)	Mevaram Jatav	Indian National Congress	
Gwalior District
14	Gwalior Rural	Bharat Singh Kushwah	Bharatiya Janata Party	
15	Gwalior	Pradhuman Singh Tomar	Bharatiya Janata Party	
16	Gwalior East	Satish Sikarwar	Indian National Congress	
17	Gwalior South	Pravin Pathak	Indian National Congress	
18	Bhitarwar	Lakhan Singh Yadav	Indian National Congress	
19	Dabra (SC)	Suresh Raje	Indian National Congress	
Datia District
20	Sewda	Ghanshyam Singh	Indian National Congress	
21	Bhander (SC)	Raksha Saroniya	Bharatiya Janata Party	
22	Datia	Dr. Narottam Mishra	Bharatiya Janata Party	
Shivpuri District
23	Karera (SC)	Pragilal Jatav	Indian National Congress	
24	Pohari	Suresh Rathkheda Dhakad	Bharatiya Janata Party	
25	Shivpuri	Yashodhara Raje Scindia	Bharatiya Janata Party	
26	Pichhore	K. P. Singh	Indian National Congress	
27	Kolaras	Birendra Raghuvanshi	Indian National Congress	Switched from BJP to INC
Guna District
28	Bamori	Mahendra Singh Sisodia	Bharatiya Janata Party	
29	Guna (SC)	Gopilal Jatav	Bharatiya Janata Party	
30	Chachoura	Lakshman Singh	Indian National Congress	
31	Raghogarh	Jaivardhan Singh	Indian National Congress	
Ashkonagar District
32	Ashok Nagar (SC)	Jajpal Singh Jajji	Bharatiya Janata Party	
33	Chanderi	Gopal Singh Chauhan	Indian National Congress	
34	Mungaoli	Brajendra Singh Yadav	Bharatiya Janata Party	
Sagar District
35	Bina (SC)	Mahesh Rai	Bharatiya Janata Party	
36	Khurai	Bhupendra Singh	Bharatiya Janata Party	
37	Surkhi	Govind Singh Rajput	Bharatiya Janata Party	
38	Deori	Harsh Yadav	Indian National Congress	
39	Rehli	Gopal Bhargava	Bharatiya Janata Party	
40	Naryoli	Pradeep Lariya	Bharatiya Janata Party	
41	Sagar	Shailendra Jain	Bharatiya Janata Party	
42	Banda	Tarbar Singh	Indian National Congress	
Tikamgarh District
43	Tikamgarh	Rakesh Giri	Bharatiya Janata Party	
44	Jatara (SC)	Harishankar Khatik	Bharatiya Janata Party	
45	Prithvipur	Shishupal Yadav	Bharatiya Janata Party	Won in 2021 bypoll necessitated after the death of Brijendra Singh Rathore
Niwari District
46	Niwari	Anil Jain	Bharatiya Janata Party	
Tikamgarh District
47	Khargapur	Rahul Singh Lodhi	Bharatiya Janata Party	
Chhatarpur District
48	Maharajpur	Neeraj Vinod Dixit	Indian National Congress	
49	Chandla (SC)	Rajesh Kumar Prajapati	Bharatiya Janata Party	
50	Rajnagar	Vikram Singh	Indian National Congress	
51	Chhatarpur	Alok Chaturvedi	Indian National Congress	
52	Bijawar	Rajesh Kumar Shukla	Bharatiya Janata Party	Switched from SP to BJP
53	Malhara	Pradyuman Singh Lodhi	Bharatiya Janata Party	
Damoh District
54	Pathariya	Rambai Govind Singh	Bahujan Samaj Party	
55	Damoh	Ajay Tandon	Indian National Congress	Won in 2021 bypoll necessitated after resignation by Rahul Lodhi
56	Jabera	Dharmendra Bhav Singh Lodhi	Bharatiya Janata Party	
57	Hatta (SC)	Ramkali Tantuway	Bharatiya Janata Party	
Panna District
58	Pawai	Prahlad Lodhi	Bharatiya Janata Party	
59	Gunnaor (SC)	Shivdayal Bagri	Indian National Congress	
60	Panna	Brijendra Pratap Singh	Bharatiya Janata Party	
Satna District
61	Chitrakoot	Neelanshu Chaturvedi	Indian National Congress	
62	Raigaon (SC)	Kalpana Verma	Indian National Congress	Won in 2021 bypoll necessitated after the death of Jugal Kishore Bagri
63	Satna	Siddharth Sukhlal Kushwaha	Indian National Congress	
64	Nagod	Nagendra Singh	Bharatiya Janata Party	
65	Maihar	Narayan Tripathi	Bharatiya Janata Party	
66	Amarpatan	Ramkhelawan Patel	Bharatiya Janata Party	
67	Rampur-Baghelan	Vikram Singh	Bharatiya Janata Party	
Rewa District
68	Sirmour	Divyaraj Singh	Bharatiya Janata Party	
69	Semariya	K.P. Tripathi	Bharatiya Janata Party	
70	Teonthar	Shyam Lal Dwivedi	Bharatiya Janata Party	
71	Mauganj	Pradeep Patel	Bharatiya Janata Party	
72	Deotalab	Girish Gautam	Bharatiya Janata Party	
73	Mangawan (SC)	Panchu Lal Prajapati	Bharatiya Janata Party	
74	Rewa	Rajendra Shukla	Bharatiya Janata Party	
75	Gurh	Nagendra Singh	Bharatiya Janata Party	
Sidhi District
76	Churhat	Sharadendu Tiwari	Bharatiya Janata Party	
77	Sidhi	Kedar Nath Shukla	Bharatiya Janata Party	
78	Sihawal	Kamleshwar Patel	Indian National Congress	
Singrauli District
79	Chitrangi (ST)	Amar Singh	Bharatiya Janata Party	
80	Singrauli	Ram Lallu Vaishya	Bharatiya Janata Party	
81	Devsar (SC)	Subhash Ram Charitra	Bharatiya Janata Party	
Sidhi District
82	Dhauhani (ST)	Kunwar Singh Tekam	Bharatiya Janata Party	
Shahdol District
83	Beohari (ST)	Sharad Kol	Bharatiya Janata Party	
84	Jaisingnagar (ST)	Jaisingh Maravi	Bharatiya Janata Party	
85	Jaitpur (ST)	Manisha Singh	Bharatiya Janata Party	
Anuppur District
86	Kotma	Suneel Saraf	Indian National Congress	
87	Anuppur (ST)	Bisahulal Singh	Bharatiya Janata Party	
88	Pushprajgarh (ST)	Phundelal Singh Marko	Indian National Congress	
Umaria District
89	Bandhavgarh (ST)	Shivnarayan Singh	Bharatiya Janata Party	
90	Manpur (ST)	Meena Singh	Bharatiya Janata Party	
Katni District
91	Barwara (ST)	Vijay Raghvendra Singh	Indian National Congress	
92	Vijayraghavgarh	Sanjay Satyendra Pathak	Bharatiya Janata Party	
93	Murwara	Sandip Shree Prasad Jaiswal	Bharatiya Janata Party	
94	Bahoriband	Pranay Prabhat Pandey	Bharatiya Janata Party	
Jabalpur District
95	Patan	Ajay Vishnoi	Bharatiya Janata Party	
96	Bargi	Sanjay Yadav	Indian National Congress	
97	Jabalpur East (SC)	Lakhan Ghanghoriya	Indian National Congress	
98	Jabalpur North	Vinay Saxena	Indian National Congress	
99	Jabalpur Cantonment	Ashok Rohani	Bharatiya Janata Party	
100	Jabalpur West	Tarun Bhanot	Indian National Congress	
101	Panagar	Sushil Kumar Tiwari	Bharatiya Janata Party	
102	Sihora (ST)	Nandni Maravi	Bharatiya Janata Party	
Dindori District
103	Shahpura (ST)	Bhoopendra Maravi	Indian National Congress	
104	Dindori (ST)	Omkar Singh Markam	Indian National Congress	
Mandla District
105	Bichhiya (ST)	Narayan Singh Patta	Indian National Congress	
106	Niwas (ST)	Dr. Ashok Marskole	Indian National Congress	
107	Mandla (ST)	Deosingh Saiyam	Bharatiya Janata Party	
Balaghat District
108	Baihar (ST)	Sanjay Uikey	Indian National Congress	
109	Lanji	Hina Kaware	Indian National Congress	
110	Paraswada	Ram Kishor Nano Kawre	Bharatiya Janata Party	
111	Balaghat	Gaurishankar Bisen	Bharatiya Janata Party	
112	Waraseoni	Pradeep Jaiswal	Independent	
113	Katangi	Tamlal Sahare	Indian National Congress	
Seoni District
114	Barghat (ST)	Arjun Singh Kakodiya	Indian National Congress	
115	Seoni	Dinesh Rai Munmun	Bharatiya Janata Party	
116	Keolari	Rakesh Pal Singh (politician)	Bharatiya Janata Party	
117	Lakhnadon (ST)	Yogendra Singh	Indian National Congress	
Narsinghpur District
118	Gotegaon (SC)	N. P. Prajapati	Indian National Congress	
119	Narsingpur	Jalam Singh Patel	Bharatiya Janata Party	
120	Tendukheda	Sanjay Sharma	Indian National Congress	
121	Gadarwara	Suneeta Patel	Indian National Congress	
Chhindwara District
122	Junnardeo (ST)	Sunil Uikey	Indian National Congress	
123	Amarwara (ST)	Kamlesh Pratap Shah	Indian National Congress	
124	Chourai	Choudhary Sujeet Mer Singh	Indian National Congress	
125	Saunsar	Vijay Revnath Chore	Indian National Congress	
126	Chhindwara	Kamal Nath	Indian National Congress	
127	Parasia (SC)	Sohanlal Balmik	Indian National Congress	
128	Pandhurna (ST)	Nilesh Pusaram Uikey	Indian National Congress	
Betul District
129	Multai	Sukhdeo Panse	Indian National Congress	
130	Amla	Dr. Yogesh Pandagre	Bharatiya Janata Party	
131	Betul	Nilay Vinod Daga	Indian National Congress	
132	Ghoradongri (ST)	Bramha Bhalavi	Indian National Congress	
133	Bhainsdehi (ST)	Dharmu Singh Sirsam	Indian National Congress	
Harda District
134	Timarni (ST)	Sanjay Shah	Bharatiya Janata Party	
135	Harda	Kamal Patel	Bharatiya Janata Party	
Hoshangabad District
136	Seoni-Malwa	Premshanker Kunjilal Verma	Bharatiya Janata Party	
137	Hoshangabad	Dr. Sitasaran Sharma	Bharatiya Janata Party	
138	Sohagpur	Vijaypal Singh	Bharatiya Janata Party	
139	Pipariya (SC)	Thakurdas Nagwanshi	Bharatiya Janata Party	
Raisen District
140	Udaipura	Devendra Singh Patel	Indian National Congress	
141	Bhojpur	Surendra Patwa	Bharatiya Janata Party	
142	Sanchi (SC)	Dr. Prabhuram Choudhary	Bharatiya Janata Party	
143	Silwani	Rampal Singh	Bharatiya Janata Party	
Vidisha District
144	Vidisha	Shashank Bhargav	Indian National Congress	
145	Basoda	Leena Jain	Bharatiya Janata Party	
146	Kurwai (SC)	Hari Singh Sapre	Bharatiya Janata Party	
147	Sironj	Umakant Sharma	Bharatiya Janata Party	
148	Shamshabad	Rajshri Singh	Bharatiya Janata Party	
Bhopal District
149	Berasia (SC)	Vishnu Khatri	Bharatiya Janata Party	
150	Bhopal Uttar	Arif Aqueel	Indian National Congress	
151	Narela	Vishvas Sarang	Bharatiya Janata Party	
152	Bhopal Dakshin-Paschim	P. C. Sharma	Indian National Congress	
153	Bhopal Madhya	Arif Masood	Indian National Congress	
154	Govindpura	Krishna Gaur	Bharatiya Janata Party	
155	Huzur	Rameshwar Sharma	Bharatiya Janata Party	
Sehore District
156	Budhni	Shivraj Singh Chouhan	Bharatiya Janata Party	
157	Ashta (SC)	Raghunath Singh Malviya	Bharatiya Janata Party	
158	Ichhawar	Karan Singh Verma	Bharatiya Janata Party	
159	Sehore	Sudesh Rai	Bharatiya Janata Party	
Rajgarh District
160	Narsinghgarh	Rajyavardhan Singh	Bharatiya Janata Party	
161	Biaora	Ramchandra Dangi	Indian National Congress	
162	Rajgarh	Bapu Singh Tanwar	Indian National Congress	
163	Khilchipur	Priyavrat Singh	Indian National Congress	
164	Sarangpur (SC)	Kunwarji Kothar	Bharatiya Janata Party	
Agar Malwa District
165	Susner	Vikram Singh Rana	Bharatiya Janata Party	Switched from Independent to BJP
166	Agar (SC)	Vipin Wankhede	Indian National Congress	
Shajapur District
167	Shajapur	Hukum Singh Karada	Indian National Congress	
168	Shujalpur	Inder Singh Parmar	Bharatiya Janata Party	
169	Kalapipal	Kunal Choudhary	Indian National Congress	
Dewas District
170	Sonkatch (SC)	Sajjan Singh Verma	Indian National Congress	
171	Dewas	Gayatri Raje Puar	Bharatiya Janata Party	
172	Hatpipliya	Manoj Choudhary	Bharatiya Janata Party	
173	Khategaon	Aashish Govind Sharma	Bharatiya Janata Party	
174	Bagli (ST)	Pahad Singh Kannoje	Bharatiya Janata Party	
Khandwa District
175	Mandhata	Narayan Patel	Bharatiya Janata Party	
176	Harsud (ST)	Kunwar Vijay Shah	Bharatiya Janata Party	
177	Khandwa (SC)	Devendra Verma	Bharatiya Janata Party	
178	Pandhana (ST)	Ram Dangore	Bharatiya Janata Party	
Burhanpur District
179	Nepanagar	Sumitra Devi Kasdekar	Bharatiya Janata Party	
180	Burhanpur	Thakur Surendra Singh Naval Singh	Independent	
Khargone District
181	Bhikangaon (ST)	Dr. Dhyansingh Solanki	Indian National Congress	
182	Barwah	Sachin Birla	Indian National Congress	
183	Maheshwar (SC)	Dr. Vijayalaxmi Sadho	Indian National Congress	
184	Kasrawad	Sachin Yadav	Indian National Congress	
185	Khargone	Ravi Joshi	Indian National Congress	
186	Bhagwanpura (ST)	Kedar Dawar	Independent	
Barwani District
187	Sendhawa (ST)	Gyarsilal Rawat	Indian National Congress	
188	Rajpur (ST)	Bala Bachchan	Indian National Congress	
189	Pansemal (ST)	Chandrabhaga Kirade	Indian National Congress	
190	Barwani (ST)	Premsingh Patel	Bharatiya Janata Party	
Alirajpur District
191	Alirajpur (ST)	Mukesh Rawat	Indian National Congress	
192	Jobat (ST)	Sulochana Rawat	Bharatiya Janata Party	Won in 2021 bypoll necessitated after the death of Kalawati Bhuria
Jhabua District
193	Jhabua (ST)	Kantilal Bhuria	Indian National Congress	
194	Thandla (ST)	Veer Singh Bhuriya	Indian National Congress	
195	Petlawad (ST)	Val Singh Maida	Indian National Congress	
Dhar District
196	Sardarpur (ST)	Pratap Grewal	Indian National Congress	
197	Gandhwani (ST)	Umang Singhar	Indian National Congress	
198	Kukshi (ST)	Surendra Singh Baghel	Indian National Congress	
199	Manawar (ST)	Dr. Hiralal Alawa	Indian National Congress	
200	Dharampuri (ST)	Panchilal Meda	Indian National Congress	
201	Dhar	Neena Vikram Verma	Bharatiya Janata Party	
202	Badnawar	Rajvardhan Singh Dattigaon	Bharatiya Janata Party	
Indore District
203	Depalpur	Vishal Jagdish Patel	Indian National Congress	
204	Indore-1	Sanjay Shukla	Indian National Congress	
205	Indore-2	Ramesh Mendola	Bharatiya Janata Party	
206	Indore-3	Akash Vijayvargiya	Bharatiya Janata Party	
207	Indore-4	Malini Gaur	Bharatiya Janata Party	
208	Indore-5	Mahendra Hardia	Bharatiya Janata Party	
209	Dr. Ambedkar Nagar-Mhow	Usha Thakur	Bharatiya Janata Party	
210	Rau	Jitu Patwari	Indian National Congress	
211	Sanwer (SC)	Tulsi Silawat	Bharatiya Janata Party	
Ujjain District
212	Nagda-Khachrod	Dilip Gurjar	Indian National Congress	
213	Mahidpur	Bahadursingh Chouhan	Bharatiya Janata Party	
214	Tarana (SC)	Mahesh Parmar	Indian National Congress	
215	Ghatiya (SC)	Ramlal Malviya	Indian National Congress	
216	Ujjain North	Paras Chandra Jain	Bharatiya Janata Party	
217	Ujjain South	Dr. Mohan Yadav	Bharatiya Janata Party	
218	Badnagar	Murli Morwal	Indian National Congress	
Ratlam District
219	Ratlam Rural (ST)	Dilip Kumar Makwana	Bharatiya Janata Party	
220	Ratlam City	Chetanya Kasyap	Bharatiya Janata Party	
221	Sailana	Harsh Gehlot	Indian National Congress	
222	Jaora	Rajendra Pandey	Indian National Congress	
223	Alot (SC)	Manoj Chawla	Indian National Congress	
Mandsaur District
224	Mandsour	Yashpal Singh Sisodia	Bharatiya Janata Party	
225	Malhargarh (SC)	Jagdish Dewda	Bharatiya Janata Party	
226	Suwasra	Hardeep Singh Dang	Bharatiya Janata Party	
227	Garoth	Devilal Dhakad	Bharatiya Janata Party	
Neemuch District
228	Manasa	Aniruddha Maroo	Bharatiya Janata Party	
229	Neemuch	Dilip Singh Parihar	Bharatiya Janata Party	
230	Jawad	Om Prakash Sakhlecha	Bharatiya Janata Party	
