= 16th Madhya Pradesh Assembly =

Sixteenth Madhya Pradesh Legislative Assembly

←	15th Assembly

Overview
- Legislative body: Madhya Pradesh Legislative Assembly
- Term: 18 December 2023 –
- Election: 2023 Madhya Pradesh Legislative Assembly election
- Government: Mohan Yadav ministry
- Opposition: Indian National Congress
- Website: Madhya Pradesh Legislative Assembly
- Members: 230
- Speaker: Narendra Singh Tomar
- Leader of the House: Mohan Yadav
- Deputy CM: Jagdish Devda & Rajendra Shukla, BJP
- Leader of the Opposition: Umang Singhar

The Sixteenth Legislative Assembly of Madhya Pradesh was constituted after the 2023 Madhya Pradesh Legislative Assembly Election which were concluded in November 2023. The results was declared on 3 December 2023.

== Members of Legislative Assembly ==
District	Constituency		Member of Legislative Assembly		Remarks
District	No.	Name	Party	Member	Remarks
Sheopur	1	Sheopur	INC	Babu Jandel	
Sheopur	2	Vijaypur	INC	Ramnivas Rawat	Resigned on 8 July 2024.
Sheopur	2	Vijaypur	INC	Mukesh Malhotra	Elected on 23 November 2024
Morena	3	Sabalgarh	BJP	Sarla Vijendra Rawat	
Morena	4	Joura	INC	Pankaj Upadhyay	
Morena	5	Sumawali	BJP	Adal Singh Kansana	
Morena	6	Morena	INC	Dinesh Gurjar	
Morena	7	Dimani	BJP	Narendra Singh Tomar	Speaker
Morena	8	Ambah (SC)	INC	Devendra Sakhwar	
Bhind	9	Ater	INC	Hemant Katare	Deputy Leader of Opposition
Bhind	10	Bhind	BJP	Narendra Singh Kushwah	
Bhind	11	Lahar	BJP	Ambrish Sharma	
Bhind	12	Mehgaon	BJP	Rakesh Shukla	
Bhind	13	Gohad (SC)	INC	Keshav Desai	
Gwalior	14	Gwalior Rural	INC	Sahab Singh Gurjar	
Gwalior	15	Gwalior	BJP	Pradhuman Singh Tomar	
Gwalior	16	Gwalior East	INC	Satish Sikarwar	
Gwalior	17	Gwalior South	BJP	Narayan Singh Kushwah	
Gwalior	18	Bhitarwar	BJP	Mohan Singh Rathore	
Gwalior	19	Dabra (SC)	INC	Suresh Raje	
Datia	20	Sewda	BJP	Pradeep Agrawal	
Datia	21	Bhander (SC)	INC	Phool Singh Baraiya	
Datia	22	Datia	INC	Rajendra Bharti	Disqualified on 3rd April 2026.
Datia	22	Datia	INC	Ghanshyam Singh	Elected in August 2026
Shivpuri	23	Karera (SC)	BJP	Ramesh Prasad Khatik	
Shivpuri	24	Pohari	INC	Kailash Kushwah	
Shivpuri	25	Shivpuri	BJP	Devendra Kumar Jain	
Shivpuri	26	Pichhore	BJP	Preetam Lodhi	
Shivpuri	27	Kolaras	BJP	Mahendra Singh Yadav	
Guna	28	Bamori	INC	Rishi Agarwal	
Guna	29	Guna (SC)	BJP	Panna Lal Shakya	
Guna	30	Chachoura	BJP	Priyanka Penchi	
Guna	31	Raghogarh	INC	Jaivardhan Singh	
Ashoknagar	32	Ashok Nagar (SC)	INC	Haribaboo Rai	
Ashoknagar	33	Chanderi	BJP	Jagannath Singh Raghuwanshi	
Ashoknagar	34	Mungaoli	BJP	Brajendra Singh Yadav	
Sagar	35	Bina (SC)	BJP	Nirmla Sapre	Defected to BJP in May 2024.
Sagar	36	Khurai	BJP	Bhupendra Singh	
Sagar	37	Surkhi	BJP	Govind Singh Rajput	
Sagar	38	Deori	BJP	Brijbihari Pateriya	
Sagar	39	Rehli	BJP	Gopal Bhargava	
Sagar	40	Naryoli	BJP	Pradeep Lariya	
Sagar	41	Sagar	BJP	Shailendra Kumar Jain	
Sagar	42	Banda	BJP	Veerendra Singh Lodhi	
Tikamgarh	43	Tikamgarh	INC	Yadvendra Singh	
Tikamgarh	44	Jatara (SC)	BJP	Harishankar Khatik	
Niwari	45	Prithvipur	INC	Nitendra Singh Rathore	
Niwari	46	Niwari	BJP	Anil Jain	
Tikamgarh	47	Khargapur	INC	Chanda Singh Gaur	
Chhatarpur	48	Maharajpur	BJP	Kamakhya Pratap Singh	
Chhatarpur	49	Chandla (SC)	BJP	Dileep Ahirwar	
Chhatarpur	50	Rajnagar	BJP	Arvind Pateriya	
Chhatarpur	51	Chhatarpur	BJP	Lalita Yadav	
Chhatarpur	52	Bijawar	BJP	Rajesh Kumar Shukla	
Chhatarpur	53	Malhara	INC	Ramsiya Bharti	
Damoh	54	Pathariya	BJP	Lakhan Patel	
Damoh	55	Damoh	BJP	Jayant Malaiya	
Damoh	56	Jabera	BJP	Dharmendra Bhav Singh Lodhi	
Damoh	57	Hatta (SC)	BJP	Uma Devi Khatik	
Panna	58	Pawai	BJP	Prahlad Lodhi	
Panna	59	Gunnaor (SC)	BJP	Rajesh Kumar Verma	
Panna	60	Panna	BJP	Brijendra Pratap Singh	
Satna	61	Chitrakoot	BJP	Surendra Singh Gaharwar	
Satna	62	Raigaon (SC)	BJP	Pratima Bagri	
Satna	63	Satna	INC	Dabbu Siddharth Sukhlal Kushwah	
Satna	64	Nagod	BJP	Nagendra Singh	
Satna	65	Maihar	BJP	Shrikant Chaturvedi	
Satna	66	Amarpatan	INC	Rajendra Kumar Singh	
Satna	67	Rampur-Baghelan	BJP	Vikram Singh	
Rewa	68	Sirmour	BJP	Divyaraj Singh	
Rewa	69	Semariya	INC	Abhay Mishra	
Rewa	70	Teonthar	BJP	Siddharth Tiwari	
Mauganj	71	Mauganj	BJP	Pradeep Patel	
Mauganj	72	Deotalab	BJP	Girish Gautam	
Rewa	73	Mangawan (SC)	BJP	Narendra Prajapati	
Rewa	74	Rewa	BJP	Rajendra Shukla	Deputy Chief Minister
Rewa	75	Gurh	BJP	Nagendra Singh	
Sidhi	76	Churhat	INC	Ajay Arjun Singh	
Sidhi	77	Sidhi	BJP	Riti Pathak	
Sidhi	78	Sihawal	BJP	Vishwamitra Pathak	
Singrauli	79	Chitrangi (ST)	BJP	Radha Ravindra Singh	
Singrauli	80	Singrauli	BJP	Ram Niwas Shah	
Singrauli	81	Devsar (SC)	BJP	Rajendra Meshram	
Sidhi	82	Dhauhani (ST)	BJP	Kunwar Singh Tekam	
Shahdol	83	Beohari (ST)	BJP	Sharad Juglal Kol	
Shahdol	84	Jaisingnagar (ST)	BJP	Manisha Singh	
Shahdol	85	Jaitpur (ST)	BJP	Jaisingh Maravi	
Anuppur	86	Kotma	BJP	Dilip Jaiswal	
Anuppur	87	Anuppur (ST)	BJP	Bisahulal Singh	
Anuppur	88	Pushprajgarh (ST)	INC	Phundelal Marko	
Umaria	89	Bandhavgarh (ST)	BJP	Shivnarayan Gyan Singh	
Umaria	90	Manpur (ST)	BJP	Meena Singh	
Katni	91	Barwara (ST)	BJP	Dhirendra Bahadur Singh	
Katni	92	Vijayraghavgarh	BJP	Sanjay Pathak	
Katni	93	Murwara	BJP	Sandeep Shriprasad Jaiswal	
Katni	94	Bahoriband	BJP	Pranay Prabhat Pandey	
Jabalpur	95	Patan	BJP	Ajay Vishnoi	
Jabalpur	96	Bargi	BJP	Neeraj Singh Lodhi	
Jabalpur	97	Jabalpur East (SC)	INC	Lakhan Ghanghoria	
Jabalpur	98	Jabalpur North	BJP	Abhilash Pandey	
Jabalpur	99	Jabalpur Cantonment	BJP	Ashok Rohani	
Jabalpur	100	Jabalpur West	BJP	Rakesh Singh	
Jabalpur	101	Panagar	BJP	Sushil Kumar Tiwari	
Jabalpur	102	Sihora (ST)	BJP	Santosh Varkade	
Dindori	103	Shahpura (ST)	BJP	Om Prakash Dhurve	
Dindori	104	Dindori (ST)	INC	Omkar Singh Markam	
Mandla	105	Bichhiya (ST)	INC	Narayan Singh Patta	
Mandla	106	Niwas (ST)	INC	Chainsingh Warkade	
Mandla	107	Mandla (ST)	BJP	Sampatiya Uikey	
Balaghat	108	Baihar (ST)	INC	Sanjay Uikey	
Balaghat	109	Lanji	BJP	Rajkumar Karrahe	
Balaghat	110	Paraswada	INC	Madhu Bhau Bhagat	
Balaghat	111	Balaghat	INC	Anubha Munjare	
Balaghat	112	Waraseoni	INC	Vivek Vicky Patel	
Balaghat	113	Katangi	BJP	Gaurav Singh Pardhi	
Seoni	114	Barghat (ST)	BJP	Kamal Marskole	
Seoni	115	Seoni	BJP	Dinesh Rai Munmun	
Seoni	116	Keolari	INC	Rajneesh Harvansh Singh	
Seoni	117	Lakhnadon (ST)	INC	Yogendra Singh Baba	
Narsinghpur	118	Gotegaon (SC)	BJP	Mahendra Nagesh	
Narsinghpur	119	Narsingpur	BJP	Prahlad Singh Patel	
Narsinghpur	120	Tendukheda	BJP	Vishwanath Singh	
Narsinghpur	121	Gadarwara	BJP	Uday Pratap Singh	
Chhindwara	122	Junnardeo (ST)	INC	Sunil Uikey	
Chhindwara	123	Amarwara (ST)	INC	Kamlesh Shah	Resigned on 29 March 2024.
Chhindwara	123	Amarwara (ST)	BJP	Kamlesh Shah	Elected in 2024 by-election
Chhindwara	124	Chourai	INC	Choudhary Sujeet Mersingh	
Chhindwara	125	Saunsar	INC	Vijay Revnath Chore	
Chhindwara	126	Chhindwara	INC	Kamal Nath	
Chhindwara	127	Parasia (SC)	INC	Sohanlal Balmik	
Chhindwara	128	Pandhurna (ST)	INC	Neelesh Pusaram Uikey	
Betul	129	Multai	BJP	Chandrashekhar Deshmukh	
Betul	130	Amla	BJP	Yogesh Pandagre	
Betul	131	Betul	BJP	Hemant Khandelwal	
Betul	132	Ghoradongri (ST)	BJP	Ganga Sajjan Singh Uikey	
Betul	133	Bhainsdehi (ST)	BJP	Mahendra Singh Chouhan	
Harda	134	Timarni (ST)	INC	Abhijeet Shah	
Harda	135	Harda	INC	Ram Kishore Dogne	
Hoshangabad	136	Seoni-Malwa	BJP	Prem Shankar Kunjilal Verma	
Hoshangabad	137	Hoshangabad	BJP	Sitasharan Sharma	
Hoshangabad	138	Sohagpur	BJP	Vijaypal Singh	
Hoshangabad	139	Pipariya (SC)	BJP	Thakurdas Nagwanshi	
Raisen	140	Udaipura	BJP	Narendra Shivaji Patel	
Raisen	141	Bhojpur	BJP	Surendra Patwa	
Raisen	142	Sanchi (SC)	BJP	Prabhuram Choudhary	
Raisen	143	Silwani	INC	Devendra Patel	
Vidisha	144	Vidisha	BJP	Mukesh Tandan	
Vidisha	145	Basoda	BJP	Hari Singh Raghuwanshi	
Vidisha	146	Kurwai (SC)	BJP	Hari Singh Sapre	
Vidisha	147	Sironj	BJP	Umakant Sharma	
Vidisha	148	Shamshabad	BJP	Surya Prakash Meena	
Bhopal	149	Berasia (SC)	BJP	Vishnu Khatri	
Bhopal	150	Bhopal Uttar	INC	Atif Arif Aqueel	
Bhopal	151	Narela	BJP	Vishvas Sarang	
Bhopal	152	Bhopal Dakshin-Paschim	BJP	Bhagwandas Sabnani	
Bhopal	153	Bhopal Madhya	INC	Arif Masood	
Bhopal	154	Govindpura	BJP	Krishna Gaur	
Bhopal	155	Huzur	BJP	Rameshwar Sharma	
Sehore	156	Budhni	BJP	Shivraj Singh Chouhan	Elected as Member of Parliament, Lok Sabha
Sehore	156	Budhni	BJP	Ramakant Bhargava	Elected on 23 November 2024
Sehore	157	Ashta (SC)	BJP	Gopal Singh Engineer	
Sehore	158	Ichhawar	BJP	Karan Singh Verma	
Sehore	159	Sehore	BJP	Sudesh Rai	
Rajgarh	160	Narsinghgarh	BJP	Mohan Sharma	
Rajgarh	161	Biaora	BJP	Narayan Singh Panwar	
Rajgarh	162	Rajgarh	BJP	Amar Singh Yadav	
Rajgarh	163	Khilchipur	BJP	Hajari Lal Dangi	
Rajgarh	164	Sarangpur (SC)	BJP	Gotam Tetwal	
Agar Malwa	165	Susner	INC	Bhairon Singh	
Agar Malwa	166	Agar (SC)	BJP	Madhav Singh	
Shajapur	167	Shajapur	BJP	Arun Bhimawad	
Shajapur	168	Shujalpur	BJP	Inder Singh Parmar	
Shajapur	169	Kalapipal	BJP	Ghanshyam Chandravanshi	
Dewas	170	Sonkatch (SC)	BJP	Rajesh Sonkar	
Dewas	171	Dewas	BJP	Gayatri Raje Pawar	
Dewas	172	Hatpipliya	BJP	Manoj Choudhary	
Dewas	173	Khategaon	BJP	Aashish Govind Sharma	
Dewas	174	Bagli (ST)	BJP	Murli Bhawara	
Khandwa	175	Mandhata	BJP	Narayan Patel	
Khandwa	176	Harsud (ST)	BJP	Kunwar Vijay Shah	
Khandwa	177	Khandwa (SC)	BJP	Kanchan Mukesh Tanve	
Khandwa	178	Pandhana (ST)	BJP	Chaya More	
Burhanpur	179	Nepanagar	BJP	Manju Rajendra Dadu	
Burhanpur	180	Burhanpur	BJP	Archana Chitnis	
Khargone	181	Bhikangaon (ST)	INC	Jhuma Solanki	
Khargone	182	Barwah	BJP	Sachin Birla	
Khargone	183	Maheshwar (SC)	BJP	Rajkumar Mev	
Khargone	184	Kasrawad	INC	Sachin Yadav	
Khargone	185	Khargone	BJP	Balkrishan Patidar	
Khargone	186	Bhagwanpura (ST)	INC	Kedar Chidabhai Dawar	
Barwani	187	Sendhawa (ST)	INC	Montu Solanki	
Barwani	188	Rajpur (ST)	INC	Bala Bachchan	
Barwani	189	Pansemal (ST)	BJP	Shyam Barde	
Barwani	190	Barwani (ST)	INC	Rajan Mandloi	
Alirajpur	191	Alirajpur (ST)	BJP	Nagar Singh Chouhan	
Alirajpur	192	Jobat (ST)	INC	Sena Mahesh Patel	
Jhabua	193	Jhabua (ST)	INC	Vikrant Bhuria	
Jhabua	194	Thandla (ST)	INC	Veer Singh Bhuriya	
Jhabua	195	Petlawad (ST)	BJP	Nirmala Dileep Singh Bhuria	
Dhar	196	Sardarpur (ST)	INC	Pratap Grewal	
Dhar	197	Gandhwani (ST)	INC	Umang Singhar	Leader of Opposition
Dhar	198	Kukshi (ST)	INC	Surendra Singh Baghel	
Dhar	199	Manawar (ST)	INC	Hiralal Alawa	
Dhar	200	Dharampuri (ST)	BJP	Kalu Singh Thakur	
Dhar	201	Dhar	BJP	Neena Verma	
Dhar	202	Badnawar	INC	Bhanwar Singh Shekhawat	
Indore	203	Depalpur	BJP	Manoj Nirbhay Singh Patel	
Indore	204	Indore-1	BJP	Kailash Vijayvargiya	
Indore	205	Indore-2	BJP	Ramesh Mendola	
Indore	206	Indore-3	BJP	Golu Shukla	
Indore	207	Indore-4	BJP	Malini Gaur	
Indore	208	Indore-5	BJP	Mahendra Hardia	
Indore	209	Dr. Ambedkar Nagar-Mhow	BJP	Usha Thakur	
Indore	210	Rau	BJP	Madhu Verma	
Indore	211	Sanwer (SC)	BJP	Tulsi Silawat	
Ujjain	212	Nagda-Khachrod	BJP	Tej Bahadur Singh Chauhan	
Ujjain	213	Mahidpur	INC	Dinesh Jain	
Ujjain	214	Tarana (SC)	INC	Mahesh Parmar	
Ujjain	215	Ghatiya (SC)	BJP	Satish Malviya	
Ujjain	216	Ujjain North	BJP	Anil Jain Kaluheda	
Ujjain	217	Ujjain South	BJP	Mohan Yadav	Chief Minister
Ujjain	218	Badnagar	BJP	Jitendra Pandya	
Ratlam	219	Ratlam Rural (ST)	BJP	Mathuralal Damar	
Ratlam	220	Ratlam City	BJP	Chetanya Kashyap	
Ratlam	221	Sailana (ST)	BAP	Kamleshwar Dodiyar	
Ratlam	222	Jaora	BJP	Rajendra Pandey	
Ratlam	223	Alot (SC)	BJP	Chintamani Malviya	
Mandsaur	224	Mandsaur	INC	Vipin Jain	
Mandsaur	225	Malhargarh (SC)	BJP	Jagdish Devda	Deputy Chief Minister
Mandsaur	226	Suwasra	BJP	Hardeep Singh Dang	
Mandsaur	227	Garoth	BJP	Chandar Singh Sisodiya	
Neemuch	228	Manasa	BJP	Aniruddha Maroo	
Neemuch	229	Neemuch	BJP	Dilip Singh Parihar	
Neemuch	230	Jawad	BJP	Om Prakash Sakhlecha	

== See also ==
- Madhya Pradesh Legislative Assembly
- 2023 Madhya Pradesh Legislative Assembly election
