= 2018 Madhya Pradesh Legislative Assembly election =

Indian state election

- 28 November 2018

All 230 seats in the Madhya Pradesh Legislative Assembly 116 seats needed for a majority
- Opinion polls
- Turnout: 75.63% (▲3.56%)
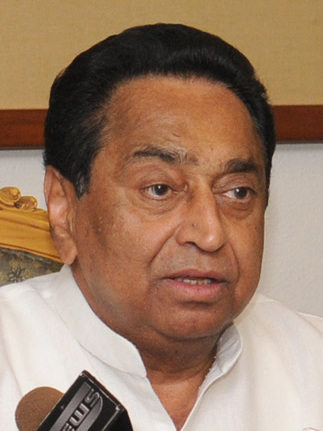

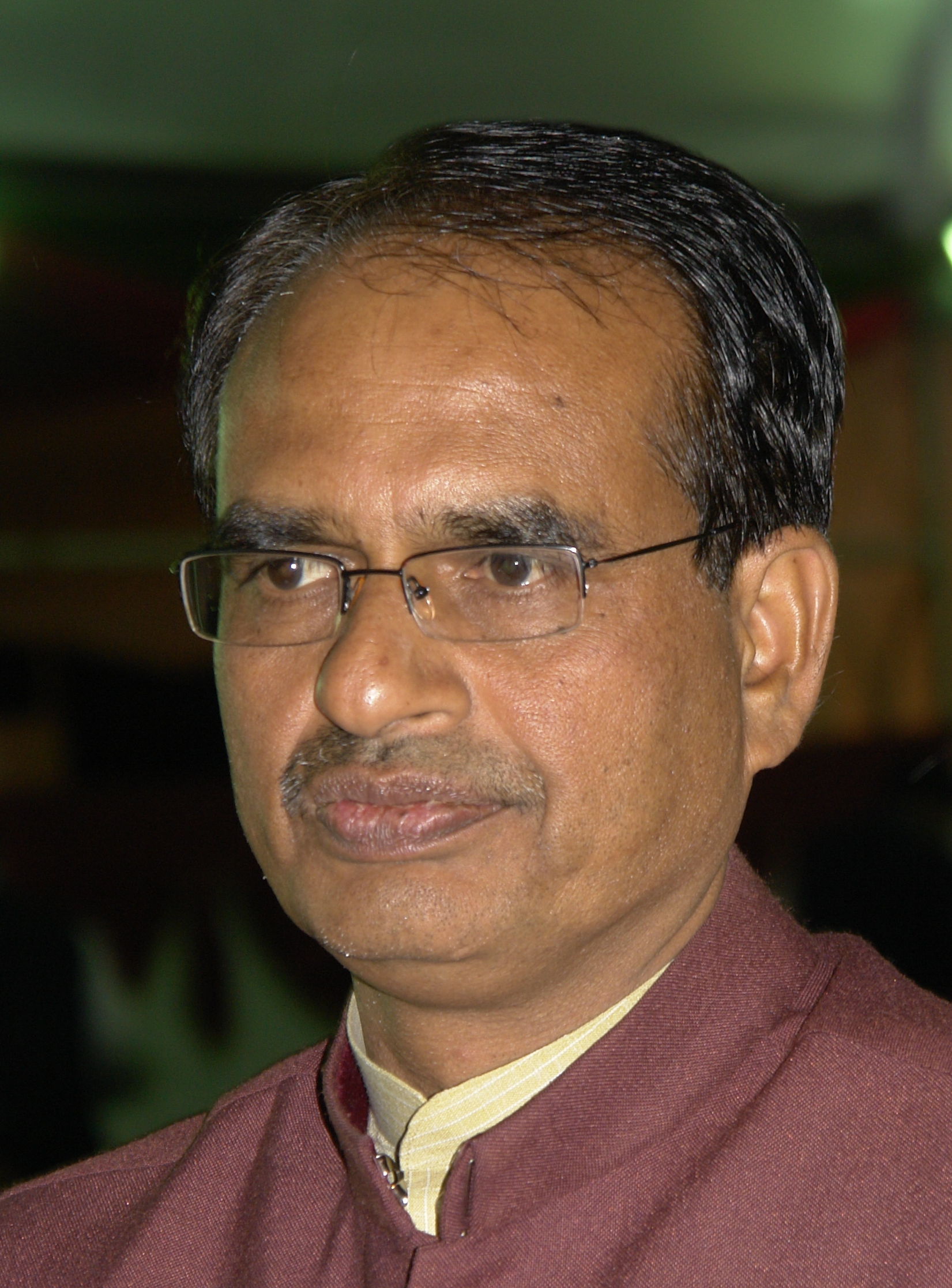

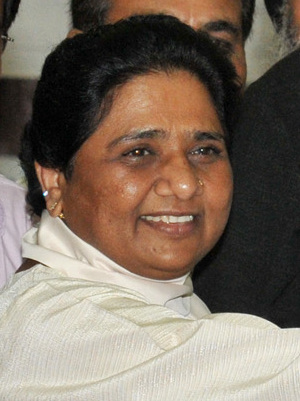
	Majority party	Minority party	Third party
Leader	Kamal Nath	Shivraj Singh Chouhan	Mayawati
Party	INC	BJP	BSP
Alliance	UPA	NDA
Leader since	2018	2005	2003
Leader's seat	Chhindwara (By-elected)	Budhni	Did Not Contest
Last election	58	165	4
Seats won	114	109	2
Seat change	▲56	▼56	▼2
Popular vote	15,595,696	15,643,623	1,911,642
Percentage	41.05%	41.06%	5.01%
Swing	▲4.76%	▼3.82%	▼1.2%
- Seatwise Election Result Map

- Structure of the Madhya Pradesh Legislative Assembly after the election
Chief Minister before election
Shivraj Singh Chouhan
BJP
Elected Chief Minister
Kamal Nath
INC

Elections to the Madhya Pradesh Legislative Assembly were held on 28 November 2018 to elect members of the 230 constituencies in Madhya Pradesh. The results were declared on 11 December 2018. The election was a direct political battle between the BJP and the INC.

While the Shivraj Singh Chouhan government vied to win for a consecutive 4th term, the INC fought for winning the state after 2003. The election led to a hung assembly, with the INC emerging as the single largest party with 114 seats and the BJP winning the popular vote and 109 seats. After the results, Congress and BSP formed the government with Kamal Nath becoming the chief minister.

Election map (by Constituencies)

== Background ==
The tenure of Madhya Pradesh Legislative Assembly elected in 2013 ended on 7 January 2019.

== Schedule ==
Election dates were announced on 6 October 2018 and voting was held on 28 November 2018.

Results were declared on 11 December 2018.

Event	Date	Day
Date for Nominations	2 Nov 2018	Friday
Last Date for filing Nominations	9 Nov 2018	Friday
Date for scrutiny of nominations	12 Nov 2018	Monday
Last date for withdrawal of candidatures	14 Nov 2018	Wednesday
Date of poll	28 Nov 2018	Wednesday
Date of counting	11 Dec 2018	Tuesday
Date before which the election shall be completed	13 Dec 2018	Thursday

== Parties contested ==
Party	Flag	Symbol	Leader	Seats contested
Bharatiya Janata Party			Shivraj Singh Chouhan	230
Indian National Congress			Kamal Nath	229
Bahujan Samaj Party			Mayawati	227
Samajwadi Party			Akhilesh Yadav	52
REGISTERED (UNRECOGNISED) PARTIES				1054
INDEPENDENT				1094

== Surveys and polls ==
=== Opinion polls ===
The opinion polls show a tough election battle between the BJP and the INC.

Date	Polling agency	BJP	INC	Others	Lead
9 November 2018	Timesnow - CNX	122	90	18	32
9 November 2018	ABP News- CSDS	116	105	09	11
9 November 2018	Cvoter	107	116	07	9
2 November 2018	ABP News- C Voter Survey	106	118	06	12
25 October 2018	IndiaTV - CNX	128	85	17	43
17 October 2018	ABP News- C Voter	108	122	–	14
10 October 2018	News Nation	111	109	10	2
9 October 2018	Times Now - Chrome DM	108	103	19	5
9 October 2018	Times Now - Warroom Strategies	142	77	11	65
14 August 2018	ABP News- C Voter	106	117	7	11
4 April 2018	IBC24	101	119	10	18
Average as on 9 November 2018		114	106	10	08

=== Exit polls ===
Most exit polls predicted a "tight finish" between the BJP and the INC. According to the poll of polls, BJP had a small edge over the Congress. However, no party would get a majority.

Polling agency	BJP	INC	Others	Lead
CNX– Times Now	126	89	15	37
News 24-Pace Media	103	115	12	12
News Nation	110	107	13	03
C Voter – Republic TV	106	118	06	12
Jan Ki Baat– Republic TV	118	105	07	13
CSDS – ABP News	94	126	10	32
Axis My India – India Today	111	113	06	02
VDPA Associates	135	88	07	47
India News- NETA	106	112	12	06
News 18- Surjit Bhalla	130	90	10	40
Today's Chanakya	103	125	02	22
Poll of Polls	113	108	09	05

== Results ==
=== Seats and vote-share ===
The election led to a hung assembly, with the INC emerging as the largest party, with 114 seats, but failing to win a majority. The seat and vote share was as follows -:

Parties and coalitions	Popular vote			Seats	
Parties and coalitions	Votes	%	±pp	Won	+/−
INC	15,595,696	41.05	▲4.76	114	▲56
BJP	15,643,623	41.06	▼3.89	109	▼56
BSP	1,911,642	5.01	▼1.29	2	▼2
SP	496,025	1.30	▲0.1	1	▲1
Independent	2,218,230	5.82	▲0.42	4	▲1
NOTA	542295	1.42			
Total	38,137,528	100.00		230	±0
Valid votes	38,137,528	99.86			
Invalid votes	51,706	0.14			
Votes cast / turnout	38,189,234	75.63			
Abstentions	12,306,017	24.37			
Registered voters	50,495,251				

==== Region-wise break up ====
District	Seats					
District	Seats	BJP	INC	IND	BSP	SP
Bagelkhand	22	19	3	—N/a	—N/a	—N/a
Bhopal	25	17	7	1	—N/a	—N/a
Bundelkhand	26	14	10	—N/a	1	1
Gird	34	7	26	—N/a	1	—N/a
Mahakoshal	46	17	28	1	—N/a	—N/a
Malwa	50	24	26	—N/a	—N/a	—N/a
Narmadapuram	11	7	4	—N/a	—N/a	—N/a
Nimar	16	4	10	2	—N/a	—N/a
Total	230	109	114	4	2	1

==== Division-wise results ====
District	Seats					
District	Seats	BJP	INC	IND	BSP	SP
Chambal	13	2	10	—N/a	1	—N/a
Gwalior	21	5	16	—N/a	—N/a	—N/a
Sagar	26	14	10	—N/a	1	1
Rewa	22	19	3	—N/a	—N/a	—N/a
Shahdol	8	5	3	—N/a	—N/a	—N/a
Jabalpur	38	13	24	1	—N/a	—N/a
Narmadapuram	11	7	4	—N/a	—N/a	—N/a
Bhopal	25	17	8	—N/a	—N/a	—N/a
Ujjain	29	16	12	1	—N/a	—N/a
Indore	37	11	24	2	—N/a	—N/a
Total	230	109	114	4	2	1

==== Constituency-wise results ====
District	Constituency		Turnout	Winner				Runner-up				Margin
District	No.	Name	Turnout	Candidate	Party	Votes	%	Candidate	Party	Votes	%	Votes
Sheopur	1	Sheopur	79.52	Babu Jandel	INC	98,580	55.17	Durga Lal Vijay	BJP	56,870	31.83	41,710
Sheopur	2	Vijaypur	78.54	Sitaram Aadivashi	BJP	63,331	36.5	Ramniwas Rawat	INC	60,491	34.86	2,840
Morena	3	Sabalgarh	75.72	Baijnath Kushwah	INC	54,606	35.6	Lal Singh Kewat	BSP	45,869	29.91	8,737
Morena	4	Joura	72.18	Banavareelal Sharma	INC	56,187	34.45	Maneeram Dhakad	BSP	41,014	25.14	15,173
Morena	5	Sumawali	71.7	Adal Singh Kansana	INC	65,455	41.07	Ajab Singh Kushwah	BJP	52,142	32.72	13,313
Morena	6	Morena	63.69	Raghuraj Singh Kansana	INC	68,965	45.62	Rustam Singh	BJP	48,116	31.83	20,849
Morena	7	Dimani	70.15	Girraj Dandotiya	INC	69,597	49.23	Shiv Mangal Singh Tomar	BJP	51,120	36.16	18,477
Morena	8	Ambah (SC)	59.01	Kamlesh Jatav	INC	37,343	29.89	Neha Kinnar	IND	29,796	23.85	7,547
Bhind	9	Ater	61.77	Arvind Singh Bhadoria	BJP	58,928	43.45	Hemant Satyadev Katare	INC	53,950	39.78	4,978
Bhind	10	Bhind	58.57	Sanjeev Singh	BSP	69,107	46.72	Chaudhary Rakesh Singh Chaturvedi	BJP	33,211	22.45	35,896
Bhind	11	Lahar	63.43	Dr. Govind Singh	INC	62,113	40.11	Rasal Singh	BJP	53,040	34.25	9,073
Bhind	12	Mehgaon	63.69	O. P. S. Bhadoria	INC	61,560	37.90	Rakesh Shukla	BJP	35,746	22.01	25,814
Bhind	13	Gohad (SC)	59.26	Ranvir Jatav	INC	62,981	48.58	Lalsingh Arya	BJP	38,992	30.07	23,989
Gwalior	14	Gwalior Rural	69.12	Bharat Singh Kushwah	BJP	51,033	32.84	Sahab Singh Gujjar	BSP	49,516	31.86	1,517
Gwalior	15	Gwalior	63.21	Pradhumn Singh Tomar	INC	92,055	52.40	Jaibhan Singh Pawaiya	BJP	71,011	40.42	21,044
Gwalior	16	Gwalior East	58.01	Munnalal Goyal	INC	90,133	51.92	Satish Singh Sikarwar	BJP	72,314	41.65	17,819
Gwalior	17	Gwalior South	60.36	Praveen Pathak	INC	56,369	36.98	Narayan Singh Kushwah	BJP	56,248	36.90	121
Gwalior	18	Bhitarwar	71.46	Lakhan Singh Yadav	INC	66,439	42.57	Anoop Mishra	BJP	54,309	34.79	12,130
Gwalior	19	Dabra (SC)	68.53	Imarti Devi	INC	90,598	60.61	Kaptan Singh Sehsari	BJP	33,152	22.18	57,446
Datia	20	Sewda	71.58	Ghanshyam Singh	INC	64,810	52.71	Radhelal Baghel	BJP	31,542	25.65	33,268
Datia	21	Bhander (SC)	69.49	Raksha Saroniya	INC	73,578	62.12	Rajni Prajapati	BJP	33,682	28.44	39,896
Datia	22	Datia	77.2	Dr. Narottam Mishra	BJP	72,209	49.0	Bharti Rajendra	INC	69,553	47.2	2,656
Shivpuri	23	Karera (SC)	73.57	Jasmant Jatave Chitree	INC	64,201	37.01	Rajkumar Omprakash Khatik	BJP	49,377	28.47	14,824
Shivpuri	24	Pohari	75.88	Suresh Rathkheda Dhakad	INC	60,654	37.06	Kailash Kushwah	BSP	52,736	32.22	7,918
Shivpuri	25	Shivpuri	71.14	Yashodhara Raje Scindia	BJP	84,570	51.5	Siddarth Ladha	INC	55,822	34.0	28,748
Shivpuri	26	Pichhore	85.24	K. P. Singh	INC	91,463	47.06	Preetam Lodhi	BJP	88,788	45.69	2,675
Shivpuri	27	Kolaras	75.98	Birendra Raghuvanshi	BJP	72,450	42.11	Mahendra Singh Yadav	INC	71,730	41.69	720
Guna	28	Bamori	79.6	Mahendra Singh Sisodia	INC	64,598	41.54	Brijmohan Singh	BJP	36,678	23.59	27,920
Guna	29	Guna (SC)	71.11	Gopilal Jatav	BJP	84,149	56.81	Chandra Prakash Ahirwar	INC	50,482	34.08	33,667
Guna	30	Chachoura	80.88	Lakshman Singh	INC	81,908	49.79	Mamta Meena	BJP	72,111	43.84	9,797
Guna	31	Raghogarh	77.12	Jaivardhan Singh	INC	98,268	61.64	Bhupendra Singh Raghuvanshi	BJP	51,571	32.35	46,697
Ashoknagar	32	Ashok Nagar (SC)	74.41	Jajpal Singh Jajji	INC	65,750	47.48	Ladduram Kori	BJP	56,020	40.46	9,730
Ashoknagar	33	Chanderi	76.02	Gopal Singh Chauhan	INC	45,106	34.33	Bhupendra Dwivedi	BJP	40,931	31.15	4,175
Ashoknagar	34	Mungaoli	74.98	Brajendra Singh Yadav	INC	55,346	39.99	Dr. Krishna Pal Singh	BJP	53,210	38.44	2,136
Sagar	35	Bina (SC)	73.46	Mahesh Rai	BJP	57,828	45.71	Shashi Katoria	INC	57,196	45.34	632
Sagar	36	Khurai	81.62	Bhupendra Bhaiya	BJP	78,156	50.71	Arunodaya Chaubey	INC	62,861	40.79	15,295
Sagar	37	Surkhi	75.74	Govind Singh Rajput	INC	80,806	55.33	Sudheer Yadav	BJP	59,388	40.66	21,418
Sagar	38	Deori	74.79	Harsh Yadav	INC	70,099	47.49	Teji Singh Rajput	BJP	65,795	44.58	4,304
Sagar	39	Rehli	76.61	Gopal Bhargava	BJP	94,305	55.78	Kamlesh Sahu	INC	67,063	39.67	26,888
Sagar	40	Naryoli (SC)	66.87	Pradeep Lariya	BJP	74,360	50.36	Surendra Chaudhary	INC	65,460	44.34	8,900
Sagar	41	Sagar	65.5	Shailendra Jain	BJP	67,227	50.96	Navy Jain	INC	49,861	37.79	17,366
Sagar	42	Banda	74.67	Tarbar Singh	INC	84,456	51.95	Harvansh Singh Rathore	BJP	60,292	37.08	24,164
Tikamgarh	43	Tikamgarh	74.71	Rakesh Giri	BJP	66,958	44.62	Yadvendra Singh	INC	62,783	41.83	4,175
Tikamgarh	44	Jatara (SC)	71.94	Harishankar Khatik	BJP	63,315	45.56	R. R. Bansal	MD	26,600	19.14	36,715
Niwari	45	Prithvipur	79.41	Brajendra Singh Rathore	INC	52,436	35.36	Dr. Shishupal Yadav	SP	44,816	30.22	7,620
Niwari	46	Niwari	75.67	Anil Jain	BJP	49,738	36.71	Meera Deepak Yadav	SP	40,901	30.19	8,837
Tikamgarh	47	Khargapur	73.15	Rahul Singh Lodhi	BJP	63,066	39.49	Chandra-Surendra Singh Gour	INC	51,401	32.19	11,665
Chhatarpur	48	Maharajpur	67.49	Neeraj Vinod Dixit	INC	52,461	36.53	Manavendra Singh	BJP	38,456	26.78	14,005
Chhatarpur	49	Chandla (SC)	62.38	Rajesh Kumar Prajapati	BJP	41,227	31.16	Anurag Hariprasad	INC	40,050	30.27	1,177
Chhatarpur	50	Rajnagar	66.29	Vikram Singh	INC	40,362	28.06	Arvind Pateriya	BJP	39,630	27.55	732
Chhatarpur	51	Chhatarpur	71.79	Alok Chaturvedi	INC	65,774	44.84	Archna Guddu Singh	BJP	62,279	42.46	3,495
Chhatarpur	52	Bijawar	70.2	Rajesh Shukla	SP	67,623	46.78	Pueshpendra Nath Pathak	BJP	30,909	21.38	36,714
Chhatarpur	53	Malhara	71.86	Kunwar Pradyumna Singh Lodhi	INC	67,184	45.16	Lalita Yadav	BJP	51,405	34.55	15,779
Damoh	54	Pathariya	74.43	Rambai Govind Singh	BSP	39,267	23.94	Lakhan Patel	BJP	37,062	22.59	2,205
Damoh	55	Damoh	75.11	Rahul Singh	INC	78,997	45.05	Jayant Malaiya	BJP	78,199	44.59	798
Damoh	56	Jabera	77.10	Dharmendra Bhav Singh Lodhi	BJP	48,901	29.05	Pratap Singh	INC	45,416	26.98	3,485
Damoh	57	Hatta (SC)	70	Ramkali Tantuway	BJP	76,607	48.41	Harishankar Choudhri	INC	56,702	35.83	19,905
Panna	58	Pawai	77.83	Prahlad Lodhi	BJP	79,647	39.83	Pandit Mukesh Nayak	INC	55,967	27.99	23,680
Panna	59	Gunnaor (SC)	72.35	Shivdayal Bagri	INC	57,658	37.55	Rajesh Kumar Verma	BJP	55,674	36.26	1,984
Panna	60	Panna	74.02	Brijendra Pratap Singh	BJP	68,359	40.21	Shivjeet Singh	INC	47,651	28.03	20,708
Satna	61	Chitrakoot	71.68	Neelanshu Chaturvedi	INC	58,465	40.9	Surendra Singh Gaharwar	BJP	48,267	33.77	10,198
Satna	62	Raigaon (SC)	73.5	Jugul Kishor Bagri	BJP	65,910	45.13	Kalpana Verma	INC	48,489	33.2	17,421
Satna	63	Satna	69.91	Dabbu Siddharth Sukhlal Kushwaha	INC	60,105	37.24	Shankarlal Tiwari	BJP	47,547	29.46	12,558
Satna	64	Nagod	78.12	Nagendra Singh	BJP	54,637	32.52	Yadvendra Singh	INC	53,403	31.79	1,234
Satna	65	Maihar	77.6	Narayan Tripathi	BJP	54,877	30.17	Srikant Chaturvedi	INC	51,893	28.52	2,984
Satna	66	Amarpatan	76.01	Ramkhelawan Patel	BJP	59,836	35.78	Dr. Rajendra Kumar Singh	INC	56,089	33.54	3,747
Satna	67	Rampur-Baghelan	75.15	Vikram Singh	BJP	68,816	38.46	Ramlakhan Singh Patel	BSP	53,129	29.69	15,687
Rewa	68	Sirmour	64.91	Divyaraj Singh	BJP	49,443	38.95	Dr. Aruna Vivek Tiwari	INC	36,042	28.39	13,401
Rewa	69	Semariya	68.99	K.P. Tripathi	BJP	47,889	35.1	Triyugi Narayan Shukla	INC	40,113	29.4	7,776
Rewa	70	Teonthar	68.74	Shyam Lal Dwivedi	BJP	52,729	40.63	Ramshankar Singh	INC	47,386	36.51	5,343
Rewa	71	Mauganj	66.98	Pradeep Patel	BJP	47,753	35.38	Sukhendra Singh	INC	36,661	27.16	11,092
Rewa	72	Deotalab	62.43	Girish Gautam	BJP	45,043	33.23	Seema Jalab Singh Sengar	BSP	43,963	32.43	1,080
Rewa	73	Mangawan (SC)	59.93	Panchu Lal Prajapati	BJP	64,488	48.54	Babita Saket	INC	45,958	34.59	18,530
Rewa	74	Rewa	66.94	Rajendra Shukla	BJP	69,806	51.04	Abhay Mishra	INC	51,717	37.81	18,089
Rewa	75	Gurh	71.23	Nagendra Singh	BJP	42,569	28.77	Kapidhwaj Singh	SP	34,741	23.48	7,828
Sidhi	76	Churhat	69.19	Sharadendu Tiwari	BJP	71,909	45.47	Ajay Arun Singh	INC	65,507	41.42	6,402
Sidhi	77	Sidhi	68.28	Kedar Nath Shukla	BJP	69,297	45.3	Kamaleshwar Prasad Dwivedi	INC	49,311	32.23	19,986
Sidhi	78	Sihawal	66.32	Kamleshwar Patel	INC	63,918	42.79	Shiva Bahadur Singh Chandel	BJP	32,412	21.7	31,506
Singrauli	79	Chitrangi (ST)	66.62	Amar Singh	BJP	86,585	55.23	Saraswati Singh	INC	27,337	17.44	59,248
Singrauli	80	Singrauli	67.53	Ramlallu Vaishya	BJP	36,706	24.63	Renu Shah	INC	32,980	22.13	3,726
Singrauli	81	Devsar (SC)	76.38	Subhash Ram Charitra	BJP	63,295	37.77	Banshmani Prasad Verma	INC	52,617	31.4	10,678
Sidhi	82	Dhauhani (ST)	74.07	Kunwar Singh Tekam	BJP	57,995	35.85	Kamlesh Singh	INC	54,202	33.5	3,793
Shahdol	83	Beohari (ST)	75.61	Sharad Kol	BJP	78,007	40.96	Tej Pratap Singh Uikey	GGP	45,557	23.92	32,450
Shahdol	84	Jaisingnagar (ST)	78.53	Jaisingh Maravi	BJP	84,669	46.2	Dhyam Singh Marko	INC	67,402	36.77	17,267
Shahdol	85	Jaitpur (ST)	78.09	Manisha Singh	BJP	74,279	41.26	Uma Dhurwe	INC	70,063	38.92	4,216
Anuppur	86	Kotma	73.33	Suneel Saraf	INC	48,249	43.87	Dilip Kumar Jaiswal	BJP	36,820	33.48	11,429
Anuppur	87	Anuppur (ST)	76.56	Bisahulal Singh	INC	62,770	49.91	Ramlal Rautel	BJP	51,209	40.72	11,561
Anuppur	88	Pushprajgarh (ST)	79.71	Phundelal Singh Marko	INC	62,352	42.22	Narendra Singh Maravi	BJP	40,951	27.73	21,401
Umaria	89	Bandhavgarh (ST)	77.97	Shivnarayan Singh	BJP	59,158	36.66	Dhyan Singh	INC	55,255	34.24	3,903
Umaria	90	Manpur (ST)	77.07	Meena Singh	BJP	82,287	46.9	Gyanvati Singh	INC	63,632	36.27	18,655
Katni	91	Barwara (ST)	74.9	Vijayraghvendra Singh	INC	84,236	48.98	Moti Kashyap	BJP	62,876	36.56	21,360
Katni	92	Vijayraghavgarh	77.07	Sanjay Satyendra Pathak	BJP	79,939	47.83	Padma Shukla	INC	66,201	39.61	13,738
Katni	93	Murwara	69.18	Sandip Shree Prasad Jaiswal	BJP	79,553	48.75	Mithilesh Jain	INC	63,473	38.9	16,080
Katni	94	Bahoriband	80.86	Pranay Prabhat Pandey	BJP	89,041	49.78	Kunwar Saurabh Singh	INC	72,606	40.59	16,435
Jabalpur	95	Patan	79.19	Ajay Vishnoi	BJP	100,443	53.96	Neelesh Awasthi	INC	73,731	39.61	26,712
Jabalpur	96	Bargi	78.52	Sanjay Yadav	INC	86,901	50.13	Pratibha Singh	BJP	69,338	40.0	17,563
Jabalpur	97	Jabalpur East (SC)	67.93	Lakhan Ghanghoriya	INC	90,206	57.64	Anchal Sonkar	BJP	55,070	35.19	35,136
Jabalpur	98	Jabalpur North	68.46	Vinay Saxena	INC	50,045	35.23	Sharad Jain	BJP	49,467	34.82	578
Jabalpur	99	Jabalpur Cantonment	67.26	Ashok Rohani	BJP	71,898	56.86	Pandit Alok Mishra	INC	45,313	35.83	26,585
Jabalpur	100	Jabalpur West	66.49	Tarun Bhanot	INC	82,359	53.21	Harendrajeet Singh	BJP	63,676	41.14	18,683
Jabalpur	101	Panagar	75.36	Sushil Kumar Tiwari	BJP	84,302	46.14	Bharat Singh Yadav	IND	42,569	23.3	41,733
Jabalpur	102	Sihora (ST)	76.29	Nandni Maravi	BJP	73,312	45.4	Khiladi Singh Aamro	INC	66,489	41.17	6,823
Dindori	103	Shahpura (ST)	79.07	Bhoopendra Maravi	INC	88,687	45.59	Omprakash Dhurwe	BJP	54,727	28.13	33,960
Dindori	104	Dindori (ST)	79.94	Omkar Singh Markam	INC	85,039	45.8	Jay Singh Maravi	BJP	52,989	28.54	32,050
Mandla	105	Bichhiya (ST)	78.48	Narayan Singh Patta	INC	76,544	40.91	Dr. Shivaraj Shah	BJP	55,156	29.48	21,388
Mandla	106	Niwas (ST)	79.01	Dr. Ashok Marskole	INC	91,007	47.94	Rampyare Kulaste	BJP	62,692	33.02	28,315
Mandla	107	Mandla (ST)	78.81	Deosingh Saiyam	BJP	88,873	46.0	Sanjeev Chhotelal Uikey	INC	76,668	39.69	12,205
Balaghat	108	Baihar (ST)	80.68	Sanjay Uikey	INC	79,399	45.72	Anupama Netam	BJP	62,919	36.23	16,480
Balaghat	109	Lanji	81.75	Hina Kaware	INC	90,382	48.02	Ramesh Bhatere	BJP	71,686	38.09	18,696
Balaghat	110	Paraswada	82.76	Ram Kishor Nano Kawre	BJP	57,395	33.65	Kankar Munjare	SP	47,787	28.02	9,608
Balaghat	111	Balaghat	79.7	Gaurishankar Bisen	BJP	73,476	41.91	Anubha Munjare	SP	45,822	26.14	27,654
Balaghat	112	Waraseoni	81.92	Pradeep Jaiswal	IND	57,783	37.23	Dr. Yogendra Nirmal	BJP	53,921	34.74	3,862
Balaghat	113	Katangi	80.91	Tamlal Sahare	INC	69,967	45.74	K. D. Deshmukh	BJP	58,217	38.06	11,750
Seoni	114	Barghat (ST)	83.1	Arjun Singh Kakodiya	INC	90,053	47.89	Naresh Warkade	BJP	82,526	43.88	7,527
Seoni	115	Seoni	79.95	Dinesh Rai Munmun	BJP	99,576	49.6	Mohan Singh Chandel	INC	77,568	38.64	22,008
Seoni	116	Keolari	84.34	Rakesh Pal Singh (politician)	BJP	85,839	43.11	Rajneesh Harivansh Singh	INC	79,160	39.76	6,679
Seoni	117	Lakhnadon (ST)	78.39	Yogendra Singh	INC	82,951	39.46	Vijay Kumar Uikey	BJP	70,675	33.62	12,276
Narsinghpur	118	Gotegaon (SC)	81.15	N. P. Prajapati	INC	79,289	49.74	Dr. Kailash Jatav	BJP	66,706	41.85	12,583
Narsinghpur	119	Narsingpur	81.57	Jalam Singh Patel	BJP	87,837	50.93	Lakhan Singh Patel	INC	72,934	42.29	14,903
Narsinghpur	120	Tendukheda	82.18	Sanjay Sharma	INC	70,127	50.29	Viswanath Singh	BJP	61,484	44.09	8,643
Narsinghpur	121	Gadarwara	83.06	Suneeta Patel	INC	79,342	50.75	Gautam Singh Patel	BJP	63,979	40.93	15,363
Chhindwara	122	Junnardeo (ST)	83.12	Sunil Uikey	INC	78,573	45.7	Ashish Janak Lal Thakur	BJP	55,885	32.5	22,688
Chhindwara	123	Amarwara (ST)	87.61	Kamlesh Pratap Shah	INC	71,662	35.53	Manmohan Shah Batti	GGP	61,269	30.38	10,393
Chhindwara	124	Chourai	86.77	Choudhary Sujeet Mer Singh	INC	78,415	45.96	Pandit Ramesh Dubey	BJP	65,411	38.33	13,004
Chhindwara	125	Saunsar	87.31	Vijay Revnath Chore	INC	86,700	51.12	Nanabhau Mohod	BJP	66,228	39.05	20,472
Chhindwara	126	Chhindwara	80.62	Deepak Saxena	INC	104,034	50.47	Chandrabhan Singh Chaudhary	BJP	89,487	43.41	14,547
Chhindwara	127	Parasia (SC)	81.22	Sohanlal Balmik	INC	79,553	48.34	Tarachand Bawaria	BJP	66,819	40.6	12,734
Chhindwara	128	Pandhurna (ST)	84.69	Nilesh Pusaram Uikey	INC	80,125	48.17	Tikaram Korachi	BJP	58,776	35.34	21,349
Betul	129	Multai	80.72	Sukhdev Panse	INC	88,219	51.31	Raja Pawar	BJP	70,969	41.28	17,250
Betul	130	Amla (SC)	76.59	Dr. Yogesh Pandagre	BJP	73,481	46.22	Manoj Malve	INC	54,284	34.14	19,197
Betul	131	Betul	80.51	Nilay Vinod Daga	INC	96,717	51.44	Hemant Vijay Khandelwal	BJP	75,072	39.93	21,645
Betul	132	Ghoradongri (ST)	84.46	Bramha Bhalavi	INC	92,106	46.92	Geeta Ramjilal Uikey	BJP	74,179	37.79	17,927
Betul	133	Bhainsdehi (ST)	84.61	Dharmu Singh Sirsam	INC	104,592	52.1	Mahendra Singh Chauhan	BJP	73,712	36.72	30,880
Harda	134	Timarni (ST)	83.14	Sanjay Shah	BJP	64,033	45.15	Abhijeet Shah	INC	61,820	43.59	2,213
Harda	135	Harda	81.54	Kamal Patel	BJP	85,651	49.0	Dr. Ramkishore Dogne	INC	78,984	45.19	6,667
Hoshangabad	136	Seoni-Malwa	84.75	Premshanker Kunjilal Verma	BJP	88,022	46.58	Omprakash Rajvanshi	INC	76,418	40.44	11,604
Hoshangabad	137	Hoshangabad	75.78	Dr. Sitasaran Sharma	BJP	82,216	52.34	Sartaj Singh	INC	66,999	42.65	15,217
Hoshangabad	138	Sohagpur	82.6	Vijaypal Singh	BJP	87,488	48.09	Satpal Paliya	INC	76,071	41.81	11,417
Hoshangabad	139	Pipariya (SC)	81.74	Thakurdas Nagwanshi	BJP	84,521	49.97	Harish Tularam Beman	INC	66,391	39.25	18,130
Raisen	140	Udaipura	78.38	Devendra Singh Gadarwa	INC	86,441	48.94	Ramkishan Patel	BJP	78,440	44.41	8,001
Raisen	141	Bhojpur	78.31	Surendra Patwa	BJP	92,458	52.81	Suresh Pachouri	INC	62,972	35.97	29,486
Raisen	142	Sanchi (SC)	75.32	Dr. Prabhuram Choudhary	INC	89,567	50.7	Mudit Shejwar	BJP	78,754	44.58	10,813
Raisen	143	Silwani	78.3	Rampal Singh	BJP	64,222	41.42	Devendra Patel	INC	57,150	36.85	7,072
Vidisha	144	Vidisha	75.22	Shashank Bhargav	INC	80,332	52.51	Mukesh Tandon	BJP	64,878	42.41	15,454
Vidisha	145	Basoda	77.06	Leena Jain	BJP	73,520	50.28	Nishank Kumar Jain	INC	63,294	43.28	10,226
Vidisha	146	Kurwai (SC)	74.77	Hari Singh Sapre	BJP	80,264	52.06	Subhash Bohat	INC	63,569	41.24	16,695
Vidisha	147	Sironj	78.55	Umakant Sharma	BJP	83,617	55.0	Umakant Sharma	INC	48,883	32.16	34,734
Vidisha	148	Shamshabad	75.38	Rajshri Singh	BJP	62,607	47.37	Jyotsna Yadav	INC	55,267	41.82	7,340
Bhopal	149	Berasia (SC)	77.17	Vishnu Khatri	BJP	77,814	47.77	Jayshree Harikaran	INC	64,035	39.31	13,779
Bhopal	150	Bhopal Uttar	65.5	Arif Aqueel	INC	90,403	58.77	Fatima Rasool Siddiqui	BJP	55,546	36.11	34,857
Bhopal	151	Narela	65.89	Vishvas Sarang	BJP	108,654	53.24	Dr. Mahendra Singh Chouhan	INC	85,503	41.89	23,151
Bhopal	152	Bhopal Dakshin-Paschim	63.66	P. C. Sharma	INC	67,323	48.97	Umashankar Gupta	BJP	60,736	44.18	6,587
Bhopal	153	Bhopal Madhya	61.2	Arif Masood	INC	76,647	53.2	Surendra Nath Singh	BJP	61,890	42.96	14,757
Bhopal	154	Govindpura	60.9	Krishna Gaur	BJP	125,487	58.0	Girish Sharma	INC	79,128	36.57	46,359
Bhopal	155	Huzur	70.5	Rameshwar Sharma	BJP	107,288	51.35	Naresh Gyanchandi	INC	91,563	43.82	15,725
Sehore	156	Budhni	83.64	Shivraj Singh Chouhan	BJP	123,492	60.25	Arun Subhashchandra	INC	64,493	31.47	58,999
Sehore	157	Ashta (SC)	82.98	Raghunath Singh Malviya	BJP	92,292	44.74	Gopal Singh	INC	86,248	41.81	6,044
Sehore	158	Ichhawar	86.43	Karan Singh Verma	BJP	86,958	50.42	Shailendra Patel	INC	71,089	41.18	15,869
Sehore	159	Sehore	81.2	Sudesh Rai	BJP	60,117	38.0	Surendra Singh Thakur	INC	39,473	24.95	20,644
Rajgarh	160	Narsinghgarh	80.44	Rajyavardhan Singh	BJP	85,335	49.64	Girish Bhandari	INC	75,801	44.10	9,534
Rajgarh	161	Biaora	80.77	Govardhan Dangi	INC	75,569	42.86	Narayan Singh Panwar	BJP	74,743	42.39	826
Rajgarh	162	Rajgarh	85.54	Bapusingh Tanwar	INC	81,921	47.02	Amar Singh Yadav	BJP	50,738	29.12	31,183
Rajgarh	163	Khilchipur	86.72	Priyavrat Singh	INC	101,854	56.38	Kunwar Hajarilal Dangi	BJP	72,098	39.91	29,756
Rajgarh	164	Sarangpur (SC)	82.33	Kunwarji Kothar	BJP	75,005	49.59	Kala Mahesh Malviya	INC	70,624	46.69	4,381
Agar Malwa	165	Susner	84.64	Vikaram Singh Rana	IND	75,804	42.1	Mahendra Bapu Singh	INC	48,742	27.07	27,062
Agar Malwa	166	Agar (SC)	82.97	Manohar Untwal	BJP	82,146	47.69	Vipin Wankhede	INC	79,656	46.24	2,490
Shajapur	167	Shajapur	83.26	Hukum Singh Karada	INC	89,940	48.85	Arun Bhimawad	BJP	44,961	24.42	44,979
Shajapur	168	Shujalpur	82.14	Inder Singh Parmar	BJP	78,952	49.11	Ramveer Singh Sikarwar	INC	73,329	45.61	5,623
Shajapur	169	Kalapipal	81.55	Kunal Choudhary	INC	86,249	52.1	Babulal Verma	BJP	72,550	43.83	13,699
Dewas	170	Sonkatch (SC)	83.92	Sajjan Singh Verma	INC	86,396	48.92	Rajendra Phulachand Verma	BJP	76,578	43.36	9,818
Dewas	171	Dewas	75.81	Gayatri Raje Puar	BJP	103,456	55.07	Jaysingh Thakur	INC	75,469	40.17	27,987
Dewas	172	Hatpipliya	85.57	Manoj Choudhary	INC	83,337	52.15	Deepak Kailash Joshi	BJP	69,818	43.69	13,519
Dewas	173	Khategaon	83.11	Aashish Govind Sharma	BJP	71,984	41.77	Om Patel	INC	64,212	37.26	7,772
Dewas	174	Bagli (ST)	83.38	Pahad Singh Kannoje	BJP	89,417	48.33	Kamal Waskale	INC	77,574	41.93	11,843
Khandwa	175	Mandhata	78.83	Narayan Patel	INC	71,228	47.22	Narendra Singh Tomar	BJP	69,992	46.4	1,236
Khandwa	176	Harsud (ST)	78.98	Kunwar Vijay Shah	BJP	80,556	52.0	Sukharam Salve	INC	61,607	39.77	18,949
Khandwa	177	Khandwa (SC)	68.77	Devendra Verma	BJP	77,123	45.47	Kundan Malviya	INC	57,986	34.2	19,137
Khandwa	178	Pandhana (ST)	80.61	Ram Dangore	BJP	91,844	46.17	Chhaya More	INC	68,094	34.23	23,750
Burhanpur	179	Nepanagar (ST)	77.73	Sumitra Devi Kasdekar	INC	85,320	46.69	Manju Rajendra Dadu	BJP	84,056	45.99	1,264
Burhanpur	180	Burhanpur	76.94	Thakur Surendra Singh Naval Singh	IND	98,561	44.87	Archana Didi	BJP	93,441	42.54	5,120
Khargone	181	Bhikangaon (ST)	77.39	Dr. Dhyansingh Solanki	INC	91,635	55.39	Dhool Singh Dawar	BJP	64,378	38.92	27,257
Khargone	182	Barwah	81.38	Sachin Birla	INC	96,230	56.53	Hitendra Singh Solanki	BJP	65,722	38.61	30,508
Khargone	183	Maheshwar (SC)	81.28	Dr. Vijayalaxmi Sadho	INC	83,087	49.05	Mev Rajkumar	BJP	47,251	27.89	35,836
Khargone	184	Kasrawad	83.42	Sachin Yadav	INC	86,070	49.07	Atmaram Patel	BJP	80,531	45.91	5,539
Khargone	185	Khargone	80.41	Ravi Joshi	INC	88,208	49.92	Balikrishan Patidar	BJP	78,696	44.53	9,512
Khargone	186	Bhagwanpura (ST)	76.56	Kedar Chidabhai Dawar	IND	73,758	43.36	Jamnasingh Solanki	BJP	64,042	37.65	9,716
Barwani	187	Sendhawa (ST)	76.3	Gyarsilal Rawat	INC	94,722	51.07	Antarsingh Arya	BJP	78,844	42.51	15,878
Barwani	188	Rajpur (ST)	80.09	Bala Bachchan	INC	85,513	47.99	Antersingh Devisingh Patel	BJP	84,581	47.47	932
Barwani	189	Pansemal (ST)	77.97	Sushri Kirade	INC	94,634	54.6	Viththal Patel	BJP	69,412	40.05	25,222
Barwani	190	Barwani (ST)	77.7	Premsingh Patel	BJP	88,151	48.14	Rajan Mandloi	INC	49,364	26.96	38,787
Alirajpur	191	Alirajpur (ST)	70.02	Mukesh Rawat	INC	82,017	52.6	Nagar Singh Chouhan	BJP	60,055	38.51	21,962
Alirajpur	192	Jobat (ST)	52.71	Kalawati Bhuriya	INC	46,067	33.53	Madhosingh Dawar	BJP	44,011	32.04	2,056
Jhabua	193	Jhabua (ST)	65.17	Guman Singh Damor	BJP	66,598	37.81	Dr. Vikrant Bhuria	INC	56,161	31.88	10,437
Jhabua	194	Thandla (ST)	87.5	Veer Singh Bhuriya	INC	95,720	47.61	Kalsingh Bhabar	BJP	64,569	32.12	31,151
Jhabua	195	Petlawad (ST)	80.46	Val Singh Maida	INC	93,425	46.9	Nirmala Dilipsingh Bhuriya	BJP	88,425	44.39	5,000
Dhar	196	Sardarpur (ST)	81.48	Pratap Grewal	INC	96,419	58.61	Sanjay Singh Baghel	BJP	60,214	36.6	36,205
Dhar	197	Gandhwani (ST)	75.57	Umang Singhar	INC	96,899	57.53	Sardarsingh Medha	BJP	58,068	34.48	38,831
Dhar	198	Kukshi (ST)	75.32	Surendra Singh Baghel	INC	108,391	65.63	Virendra Singh Baghel	BJP	45,461	27.53	62,930
Dhar	199	Manawar (ST)	79.45	Dr. Hiralal Alawa	INC	101,500	58.43	Ranjana Baghel	BJP	61,999	35.69	39,501
Dhar	200	Dharampuri (ST)	79.47	Panchilal Meda	INC	78,504	50.65	Gopal Kannoj	BJP	64,532	41.64	13,972
Dhar	201	Dhar	73.54	Neena Vikram Verma	BJP	93,180	49.47	Prabha Balamkundsingh	INC	87,462	46.43	5,718
Dhar	202	Badnawar	86.11	Rajvardhan Singh Dattigaon	INC	84,499	50.4	Bhanwar Singh Shekhawat	BJP	42,993	25.65	41,506
Indore	203	Depalpur	82.55	Vishal Jagdish Patel	INC	94,981	50.46	Manoj Nirbhaysingh	BJP	85,937	45.66	9,044
Indore	204	Indore-1	69.11	Sanjay Shukla	INC	114,555	50.24	Sudarshan Gupta	BJP	106,392	46.66	8,163
Indore	205	Indore-2	64.75	Ramesh Mendola	BJP	138,794	63.94	Mohan Singh Sengar	INC	67,783	31.23	71,011
Indore	206	Indore-3	70.29	Akash Vijayvargiya	BJP	67,075	50.96	Ashwin Joshi	INC	61,324	46.59	5,751
Indore	207	Indore-4	67.7	Malini Gaur	BJP	102,673	61.12	Surjeet Singh	INC	59,583	35.47	43,090
Indore	208	Indore-5	65.67	Mahendra Hardia	BJP	117,836	48.3	Satyanarayan Patel	INC	116,703	47.84	1,133
Indore	209	Dr. Ambedkar Nagar-Mhow	79.3	Usha Thakur	BJP	97,009	49.86	Antar Singh Darbar	INC	89,852	46.18	7,157
Indore	210	Rau	74.53	Jitu Patwari	INC	107,740	49.95	Madhu Verma	BJP	102,037	47.31	5,703
Indore	211	Sanwer	80.89	Tulsi Silawat	INC	96,535	48.38	Dr. Rajesh Sonkar	BJP	93,590	46.9	2,945
Ujjain	212	Nagda-Khachrod	82.03	Dilip Gurjar	INC	83,823	49.89	Dilip Singh Shekhawat	BJP	78,706	46.85	5,117
Ujjain	213	Mahidpur	81.1	Bahadursingh Chouhan	BJP	70,499	44.69	Dinesh Jain	INC	55,279	35.02	15,220
Ujjain	214	Tarana (SC)	80.29	Mahesh Parmar	INC	67,778	48.38	Anil Firojiya	BJP	65,569	46.81	2,209
Ujjain	215	Ghatiya (SC)	80.22	Ramlal Malviya	INC	79,639	48.47	Ajit Premchand Guddu	BJP	75,011	44.66	4,628
Ujjain	216	Ujjain North	67.53	Paras Chandra Jain	BJP	77,271	52.49	Mhanat Rajendra Bharati	INC	51,547	35.02	25,724
Ujjain	217	Ujjain South	68.67	Dr. Mohan Yadav	BJP	78,178	46.71	Rajendra Vashishta	INC	59,218	35.38	18,960
Ujjain	218	Badnagar	82.78	Murli Morwal	INC	76,802	49.39	Sanjay Sharma	BJP	71,421	45.93	5,381
Ratlam	219	Ratlam Rural (ST)	85.43	Dilip Kumar Makwana	BJP	79,806	49.3	Thawarlal Bhuriya	INC	74,201	45.83	5,605
Ratlam	220	Ratlam City	73.03	Chetanya Kasyap	BJP	91,986	63.66	Manoj Malve	INC	48,551	33.6	43,435
Ratlam	221	Sailana (ST)	89.0	Harsh Gehlot	INC	73,597	44.73	Narayan Maida	BJP	45,099	27.41	28,498
Ratlam	222	Jaora	84.21	Rajendra Pandey	BJP	64,503	36.49	K. K. Singh Kalukheda	INC	63,992	36.2	511
Ratlam	223	Alot (SC)	82.62	Manoj Chawla	INC	80,821	49.42	Jitendra Thawarchand	BJP	75,373	46.08	5,448
Mandsaur	224	Mandsour	79.63	Yashpal Singh Sisodia	BJP	102,626	52.52	Narendra Nahata	INC	84,256	43.12	18,370
Mandsaur	225	Malhargarh (SC)	86.5	Jagdish Devda	BJP	99,839	51.03	Parshuram Sisodiya	INC	87,967	44.96	11,872
Mandsaur	226	Suwasra	82.55	Hardeep Singh Dang	INC	93,169	45.03	Radheshyam Nanelal Patidar	BJP	92,819	44.86	350
Mandsaur	227	Garoth	79.6	Devilal Dhakad	BJP	75,946	41.93	Subhash Kumar Sojata	INC	73,838	40.76	2,108
Neemuch	228	Manasa	84.86	Anirudha Maroo	BJP	87,004	56.64	Umrao Singh Shivlal	INC	61,050	39.74	25,954
Neemuch	229	Neemuch	79.69	Dilip Singh Parihar	BJP	87,197	51.93	Satya Narayan	INC	72,340	43.08	14,857
Neemuch	230	Jawad	84.45	Om Prakash Sakhlecha	BJP	52,316	37.4	Rajkumar Rameshchandra	INC	48,045	34.35	4,271

== Government formation ==
The counting of votes started on 11 December 2018, results were fluctuating throughout the day. On 12 December 2018 final figure of the result was declared. The INC became the single largest party with 114 seats. BJP won 109 seats. INC claimed support of Samajwadi Party's 1 MLA, Bahujan Samaj Party's 2 MLA and 4 Independent MLA . Due to no majority Shivraj Singh Chouhan, Chief Minister Of Madhya Pradesh resigned on 12 December 2018. Kamal Nath took oath on 17 December 2018 as new Chief Minister Of Madhya Pradesh and with this, INC came back to the power in State after 15 years. However, after the resignation of 22 sitting MLAs from the INC, Kamal Nath resigned on 20 March 2020 and subsequently Shivraj Singh Chouhan of the BJP returned as the CM again on 23 March 2020.

== By-elections ==
S.No	Date	Constituency	MLA before election	Party before election	Elected MLA	Party after election
1	29 April 2019	Chhindwara	Deepak Saxena	Indian National Congress	Kamal Nath	Indian National Congress
2	21 October 2019	Jhabua	Guman Singh Damor	Bharatiya Janata Party	Kantilal Bhuria	Indian National Congress
3	10 November 2020	Morena	Raghuraj Singh Kansana	Indian National Congress	Rakesh Mavai	Indian National Congress
4	10 November 2020	Dimani	Girraj Dandotiya	Indian National Congress	Ravindra Singh Tomar	Indian National Congress
5	10 November 2020	Ambah	Kamlesh Jatav	Indian National Congress	Kamlesh Jatav	Bharatiya Janata Party
6	10 November 2020	Mehgaon	O.P.S. Bhadoria	Indian National Congress	O.P.S. Bhadoria	Bharatiya Janata Party
7	10 November 2020	Gohad	Ranvir Jatav	Indian National Congress	Mevaram Jatav	Indian National Congress
8	10 November 2020	Gwalior	Pradyumn Singh Tomar	Indian National Congress	Pradyumn Singh Tomar	Bharatiya Janata Party
9	10 November 2020	Gwalior East	Munnalal Goyal	Indian National Congress	Satish Sikarwar	Indian National Congress
10	10 November 2020	Dabra	Imarti Devi	Indian National Congress	Suresh Raje	Indian National Congress
11	10 November 2020	Bhander	Raksha Santram Saroniya	Indian National Congress	Raksha Santram Saroniya	Bharatiya Janata Party
12	10 November 2020	Karera	Jasmant Jatav	Indian National Congress	Pragilal Jatav	Indian National Congress
13	10 November 2020	Pohari	Suresh Dhakad	Indian National Congress	Suresh Dhakad	Bharatiya Janata Party
14	10 November 2020	Bamori	Mahendra Singh Sisodia	Indian National Congress	Mahendra Singh Sisodia	Bharatiya Janata Party
15	10 November 2020	Ashok Nagar	Jajpal Singh Jajji	Indian National Congress	Jajpal Singh Jajji	Bharatiya Janata Party
16	10 November 2020	Mungaoli	Brajendra Singh Yadav	Indian National Congress	Brajendra Singh Yadav	Bharatiya Janata Party
17	10 November 2020	Surkhi	Govind Singh Rajput	Indian National Congress	Govind Singh Rajput	Bharatiya Janata Party
18	10 November 2020	Anuppur	Bisahulal Singh	Indian National Congress	Bisahulal Singh	Bharatiya Janata Party
19	10 November 2020	Sanchi	Prabhuram Choudhary	Indian National Congress	Prabhuram Choudhary	Bharatiya Janata Party
20	10 November 2020	Agar	Manohar Untwal	Bharatiya Janata Party	Vipin Wankhede	Indian National Congress
21	10 November 2020	Hatpipliya	Manoj Choudhary	Indian National Congress	Manoj Choudhary	Bharatiya Janata Party
22	10 November 2020	Badnawar	Rajvardhan Singh	Indian National Congress	Rajvardhan Singh	Bharatiya Janata Party
23	10 November 2020	Sanwer	Tulsiram Silawat	Indian National Congress	Tulsiram Silawat	Bharatiya Janata Party
24	10 November 2020	Suwasra	Hardeep Singh Dang	Indian National Congress	Hardeep Singh Dang	Bharatiya Janata Party
25	10 November 2020	Joura	Banwari Lal Sharma	Indian National Congress	Subedar Singh Rajodha	Bharatiya Janata Party
26	10 November 2020	Malhara	Pradyuman Singh Lodhi	Indian National Congress	Pradyuman Singh Lodhi	Bharatiya Janata Party
27	10 November 2020	Nepanagar	Sumitra Kasdekar	Indian National Congress	Sumitra Kasdekar	Bharatiya Janata Party
28	10 November 2020	Mandhata	Narayan Patel	Indian National Congress	Narayan Patel	Bharatiya Janata Party
29	10 November 2020	Biaora	Goverdhan Dangi	Indian National Congress	Ramchandra Dangi	Indian National Congress
30	10 November 2020	Sumaoli	Adal Singh Kansana	Indian National Congress	Ajay Singh Kushwaha	Indian National Congress
31	17 April 2021	Damoh	Rahul Lodhi	Indian National Congress	Ajay Tandon	Indian National Congress
32	30 October 2021	Prithvipur	Brijendra Singh Rathore	Indian National Congress	Shishupal Yadav	Bharatiya Janata Party
33	30 October 2021	Raigaon	Jugal Kishore Bagri	Bharatiya Janata Party	Kalpana Verma	Indian National Congress
34	30 October 2021	Jobat	Kalawati Bhuria	Indian National Congress	Sulochana Rawat	Bharatiya Janata Party

== See also ==
- Elections in India
- 2018 elections in India
- 2020 Madhya Pradesh political crisis
- 2020 Madhya Pradesh Legislative Assembly by-elections
