= Gopilal Jatav =

Indian politician (born 1948)

Member of the Madhya Pradesh Legislative Assembly
- In office 2018–2023
- Preceded by: Panna Lal Shakya
- Succeeded by: Panna Lal Shakya
- Constituency: Guna
- In office 2013–2018
- Preceded by: Ladduram Kori
- Succeeded by: Jaipal Singh Jajji
- Constituency: Ashok Nagar
- In office 1990–2008
- Preceded by: Ramsuman
- Succeeded by: Ladduram Kori
- Constituency: Shadora

Personal details
- Born: 15 August 1948 (age 77) Guna, Madhya Pradesh, India
- Party: Bharatiya Janata Party
- Parent: Ganesh Ram (father)
- Occupation: Agriculturist, Politician

Gopilal Jatav (born 15 August 1948) is an Indian politician from Madhya Pradesh who is associated with the Bharatiya Janata Party (BJP). He belongs to the Scheduled Caste Jatav community. Jatav served as a Member of the Madhya Pradesh Legislative Assembly from the Ashok Nagar constituency between 2013 and 2018.

== Early life ==
Gopilal Jatav was born on 15 August 1948 in Guna, Madhya Pradesh, to Ganesh Ram.

== Political career ==
Gopilal Jatav contested the 2013 Madhya Pradesh Legislative Assembly election from the Ashok Nagar seat as a candidate of the Bharatiya Janata Party and won the election. He represented the constituency till 2018. From 2018 to 2023, he represented the Guna Assembly constituency.

== See also ==
- Ashok Nagar district
- Madhya Pradesh Legislative Assembly
- Bharatiya Janata Party
