= Ashoknagar =

Ashoknagar may refer to these places in India:

== Places ==
- Ashok Nagar (Delhi), neighborhood of West Delhi, Delhi, India
  - New Ashok Nagar metro station
- Ashoknagar, Madhya Pradesh, city in Madhya Pradesh
  - Ashoknagar district, district of Madhya Pradesh centred on the city
    - Ashoknagar tehsil, subdisctrict in the district
  - Ashok Nagar (Vidhan Sabha constituency)
  - Ashoknagar railway station
- Ashoknagar Kalyangarh
  - Ashoknagar (Vidhan Sabha constituency)
  - Ashoknagar Road railway station
- Ashok Nagar, Allahabad, Uttar Pradesh
- Ashok Nagar, Chennai, Tamil Nadu
  - Ashok Nagar metro station, Chennai
- Ashok Nagar, Eluru, West Bengal
- Ashok Nagar, Hyderabad, Telangana
- Ashok Nagar, Mumbai, Maharashtra
- Ashok Nagar Ajmer, Rajasthan

== See also ==
- Ashok (disambiguation)
- Nagar (disambiguation)
