= Ashok Nagar, Chennai =

Ashok Nagar
- Neighbourhood
- Ashok Nagar (Chennai) Ashok Nagar (Tamil Nadu) Ashok Nagar (India)
- Coordinates: 13.0373°N 80.2123°E
- Country: India
- State: Tamil Nadu
- District: Chennai
- Metro: Chennai
- Ward: 122
- Elevation: 55 m (180 ft)

Languages
  - Official: Tamil
- Time zone: UTC+5:30 (IST)
- PIN: 600083
- Vehicle registration: TN 09 (RTO, Chennai West)
- Parliamentary constituency: Chennai South
- Assembly constituency: T Nagar

Ashok Nagar is a residential locality situated at the southern part of Chennai, Tamil Nadu, India. It was established in 1964. At the heart of this colony, stands the Ashok Pillar. This four lion head stump, resembles the one erected by king Ashoka during the 3rd century BCE at Sanchi.

To promote this suburban locality, the Tamil Nadu Housing Board constructed flats during the 1970s for middle-income group, covering an area of 7 sq km including the neighbourhood of K. K. Nagar. The next major infrastructure was shopping complex constructed near Pillar in 1974. Banks, Ration shop, grocery stores, urban development office started functioning here. Followed by it was inauguration of Anna Community hall and sports club. In the early 1980s, Udhayam Theatre complex and ESI hospital emerged. Later more government schools and additional facilities were added.

== Location ==
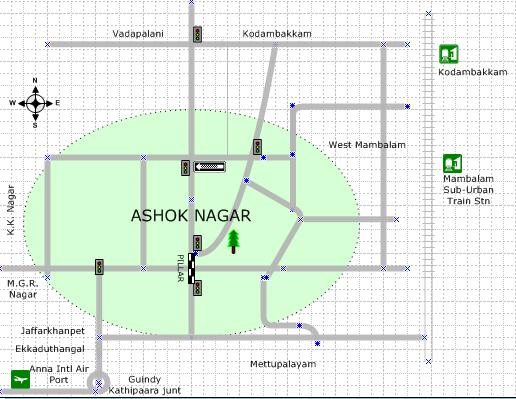
Ashok Nagar, Chennai.

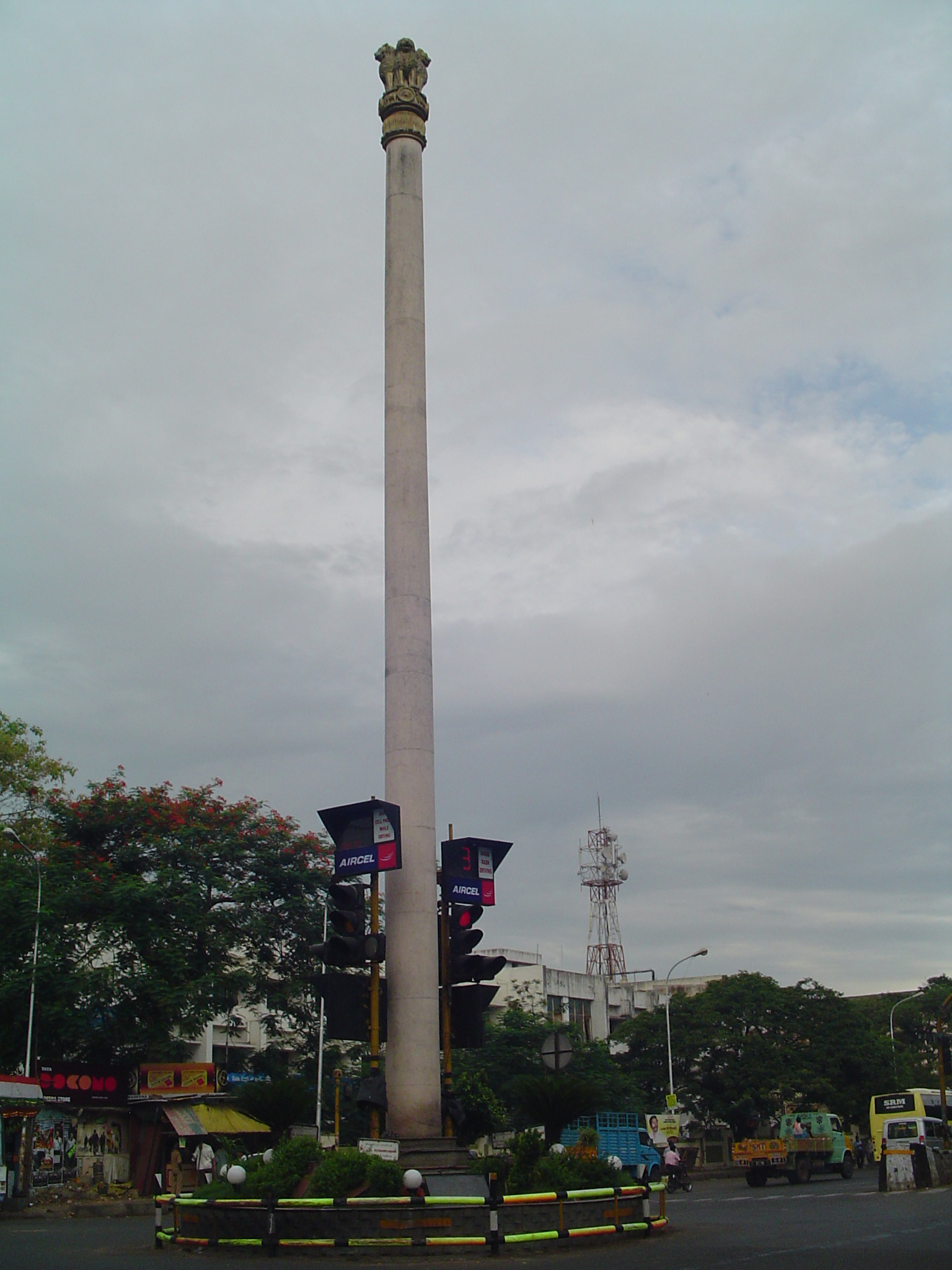
Ashok Pillar Junction

Ashok Nagar is located west of Mambalam (T. Nagar), Chennai, Tamil Nadu, India. It is surrounded by KK Nagar on the West, Vadapalani on the North, Kodambakkam on the North East and Saidapet on the South.

== Business establishments ==
Ashok Nagar has several finance establishments had set up their operations.

== Transportation ==
There is an intra-city connectivity from Ashok Nagar. Government city buses and share autos commutes to North, Mid and South Chennai.

Ashok Nagar Metro station is another key hub for Chennai Metro Green line. It connects Airport, Egmore railway station and Central railway station.

Ashok Nagar is one of the well-planned localities in Chennai, with broad roads and road-numbering system.

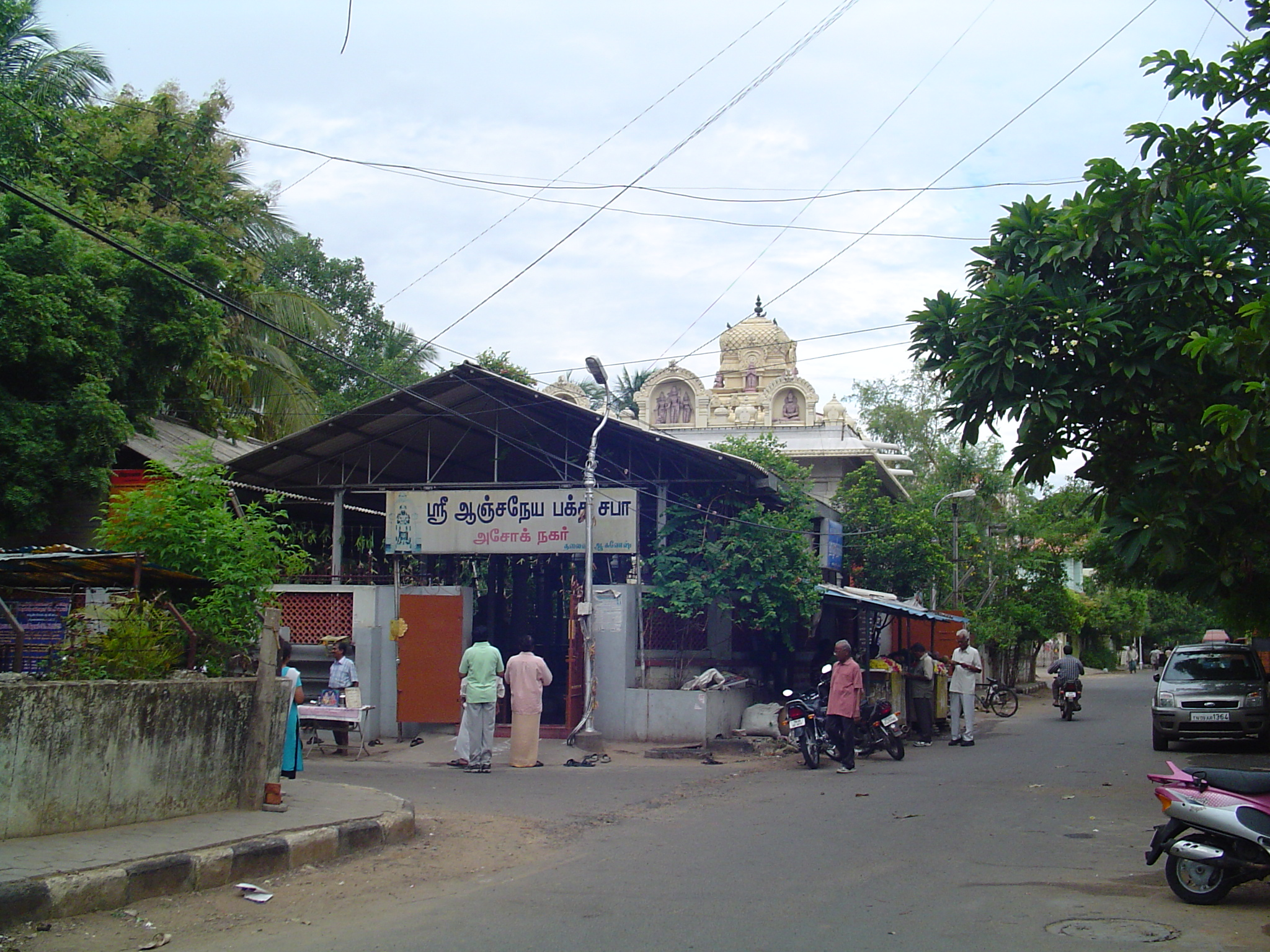
Hanumanthavanam

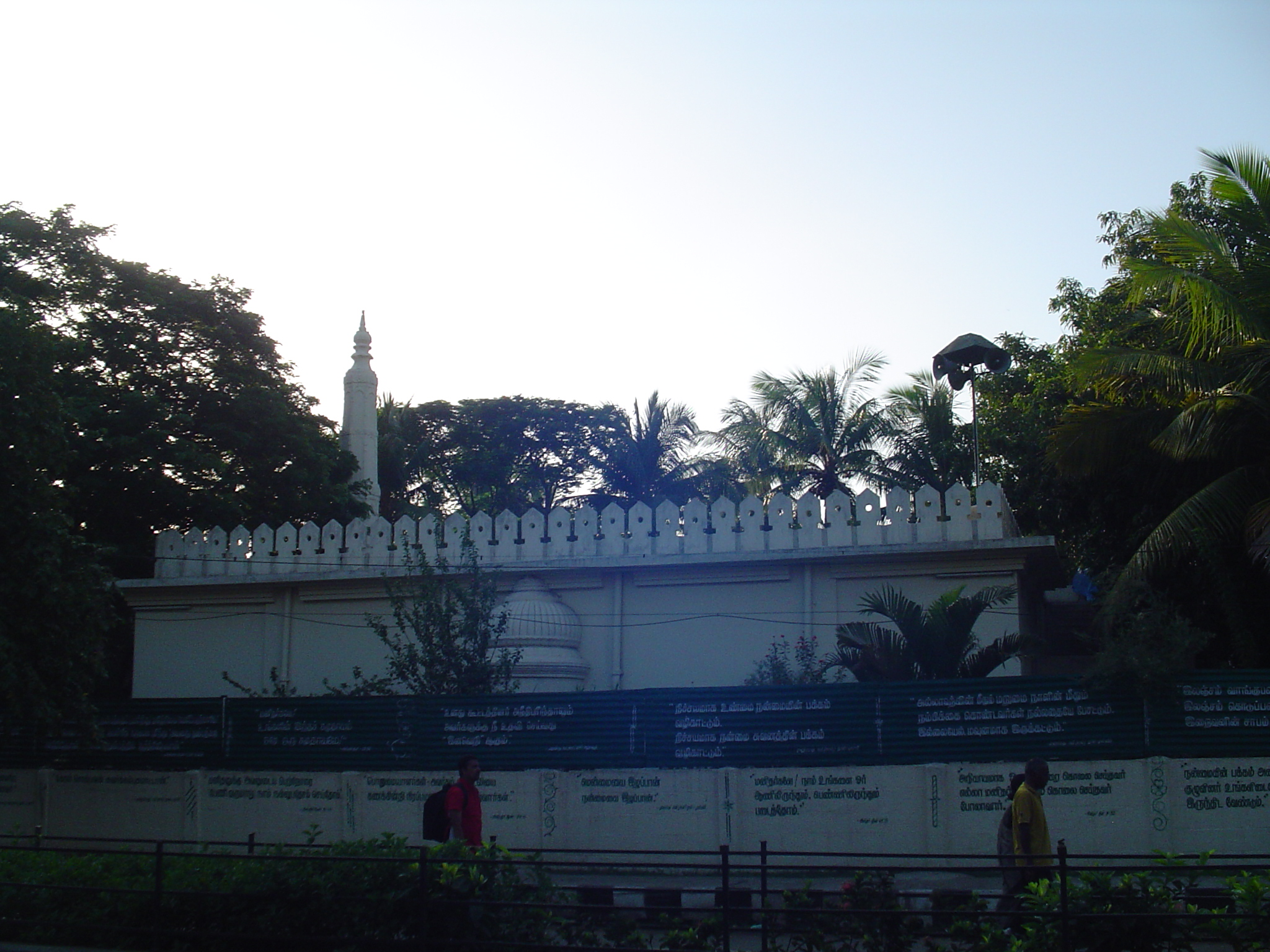
Mosque

== Entertainment ==
Close by Vadapalani are the Kamala, AVM Rajeswari, SSR Pangajam, Palazzo screens. Kasi and Kasi talkies are at Ekattuthangal.

Sangamam, is a 10-day music & dance festival conducted across Chennai during the month of January. Ashok Nagar corporation park is one of the venue that hosts this festival.

== Play areas ==
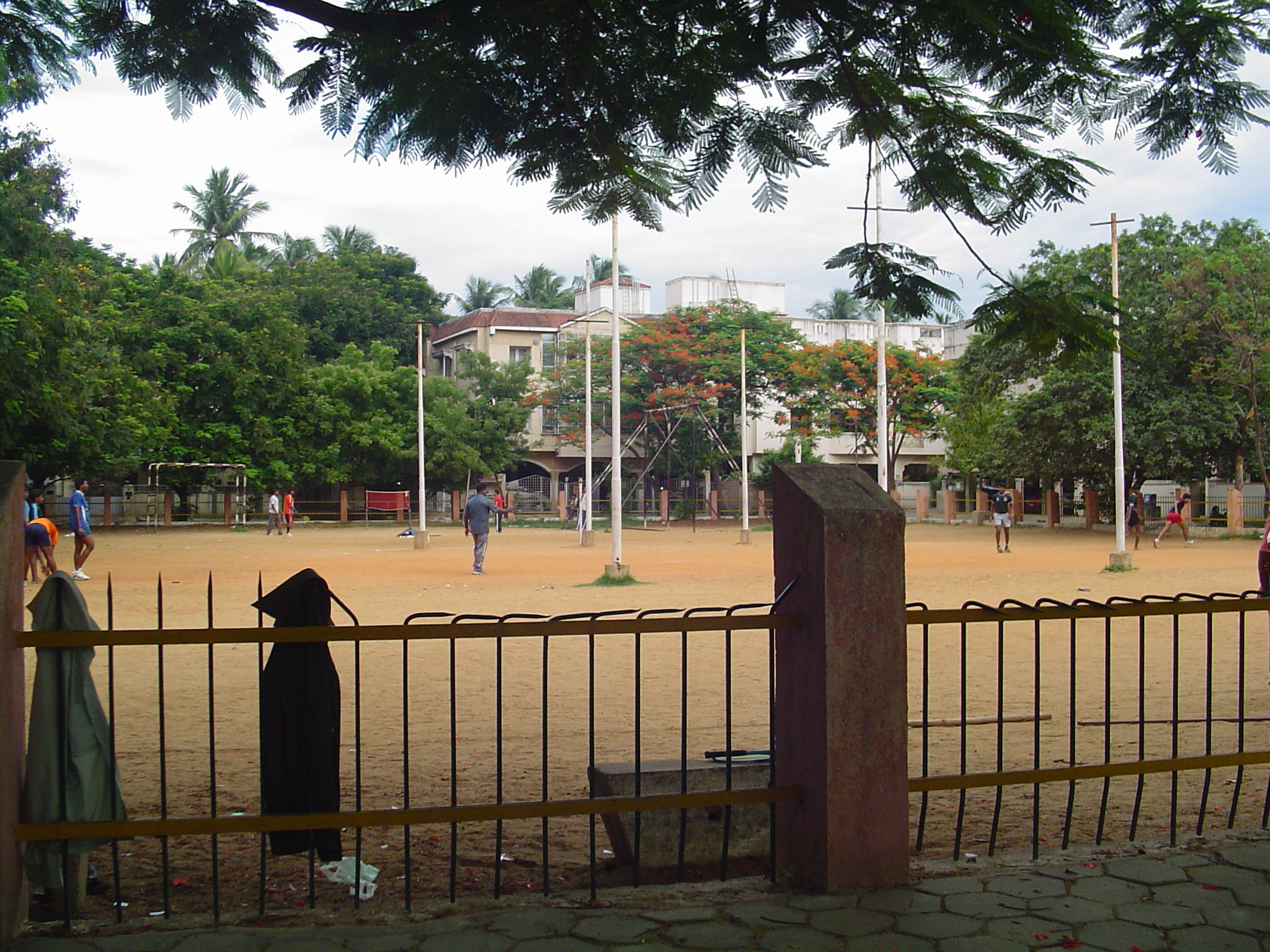
Manthoppu Colony Ground

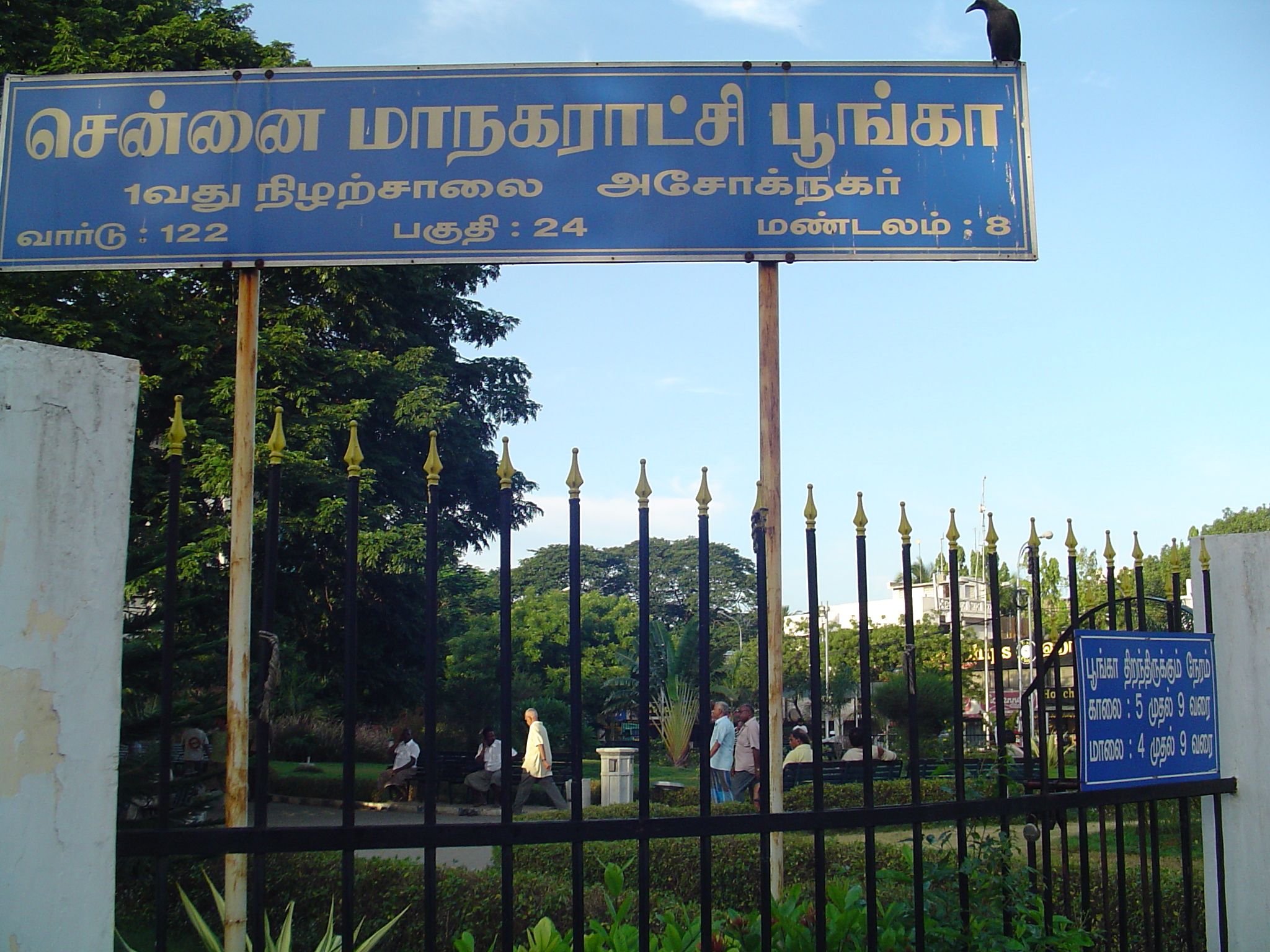
Corporation Park

The corporation park is situated near pillar junction. This park has track for walking and a small play area for kids. It is well maintained with cleanliness and toilet facilities. Visitors should park their vehicles outside. Park timings are morning between 5 am and 9 am, evening between 4 pm and 9 pm. Chennai corporation's elected council gave the green signal to Metro Rail for taking over the 4,246 square metres of Corporation park in Ashok Nagar.

Kids play park at 12th Avenue is a compact play area for kids below 10. Park timings are morning between 5am and 9am, evening between 4 pm and 9 pm. This park is also called as 5E park.

The Manthope Colony Cricket ground located near Manthope Colony has many unofficial sports clubs. A Tennikoit and Badminton courts are there. Elders and Youths team up for match early mornings and weekends. Football is played in the evenings by many groups. This ground has flood lights which are lit up during evenings daily. Football is primarily played after 5 pm

Pudhur High School Ground is another spot where many cricket pitches are made on weekends.

== Educational institutions ==
- Sri Chaitanya Techno Curriculum
- Govt. Girls Hr. Sec. School
- Velankanni Matriculation Higher Secondary School
- Police Training College
- Jawahar Vidyalaya
- Dr. K. K. Nirmala Girls Higher Secondary School
- Vidya Niketan
- Kendriya Vidyalaya Ashok Nagar
- Pudur High School
- Brindavan Institute for Commerce
- GRT Matriculation School
- St. John's Matriculation School
- Little Flower Matriculation Higher Secondary School
- Jawahar Higher Secondary School
- JRK Matriculation Higher Secondary School
- Vidhayaniketan Matriculation Higher Secondary School

== Newspapers ==
- Pillar Times
- Arcot Road Talk
- Pillar Talk
- Mambalam Times

== Restaurants and eateries ==
Ashok Nagar has a significant commercial presence with numerous restaurants and eateries operating along its arterial roads and shopping stretches. The locality includes branches of established restaurant chains and regional dining outlets serving South Indian, Chettinad and multi-cuisine food. Dining establishments in the area include Buhari Hotel, Anjappar Chettinad Restaurant and Truly Herbivore.

== See also ==
- Ashok Nagar (disambiguation)
