= Arif Masood =

Indian politician

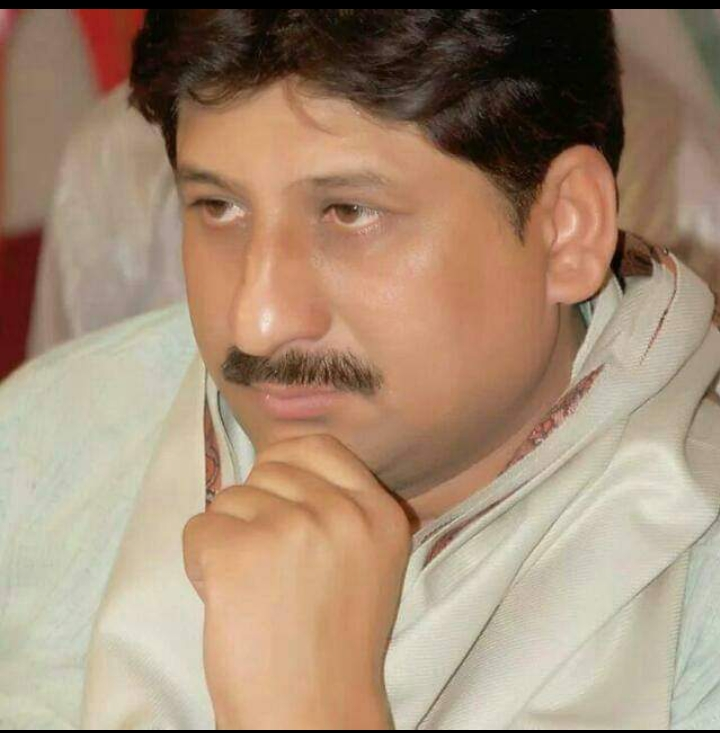

Member of the Madhya Pradesh Legislative Assembly
- Incumbent
- Assumed office 2018
- Constituency: Bhopal Madhya

Personal details
- Born: September 12, 1972 (age 53)
- Party: Indian National Congress
- Spouse: Rubina Masood
- Children: 2 sons & 2 daughters
- Parent: Manzoor Ahmad (father)
- Education: Post Graduate
- Alma mater: Barkatullah University, Bhopal (LLB)

Arif Masood is an Indian politician hailing from Bhopal, known for his tenure as the Member of the Legislative Assembly representing the 153 Bhopal Madhya Assembly constituency. He rose to prominence after securing his first election victory as an Indian National Congress MLA in Madhya Pradesh Assembly Elections 2018, followed by a successful re-election in Assembly Elections 2023. Notably, Masood is among the only two Muslim MLAs served in the 15th Madhya Pradesh Assembly and serving in the 16th Madhya Pradesh Assembly.

Masood's journey into politics began following his completion of a Bachelor of Law degree from the State Law College in 1998. During his pursuit of a Master’s degree at Government Benazeer College in 2000, he ventured into student politics, laying the groundwork for his future political career. Initially aligning with the Congress party, Masood briefly transitioned to the Samajwadi Party in 2003 before reaffiliating with the Congress in 2007.

== Electoral Performance ==
Sl.No	Year	Election	Constituency	Votes	Vote share	Margin	Result
1.	2018	Madhya Pradesh Legislative Assembly	Bhopal Madhya	76,647	53.2%	14,757	Won
2.	2023	Madhya Pradesh Legislative Assembly	Bhopal Madhya	82,371	54.3%	15,891	Won
