= Seoni Assembly constituency =

Constituency of the Madhya Pradesh legislative assembly in India

Coordinates: 22.09°N 79.55°E

Seoni
- Constituency No. 115 for the Madhya Pradesh Legislative Assembly

Constituency details
- Country: India
- Region: Central India
- State: Madhya Pradesh
- District: Seoni
- Lok Sabha constituency: Balaghat
- Established: 1951
- Reservation: None

Member of Legislative Assembly
- 16th Madhya Pradesh Legislative Assembly
- Incumbent Dinesh Rai Munmun
- Party: Bharatiya Janata Party
- Elected year: 2023
- Preceded by: Neeta Pateriya

Seoni Assembly constituency is one of the 230 Vidhan Sabha (Legislative Assembly) constituencies of Madhya Pradesh state in central India. It comprises Seoni city, and other parts of Seoni tehsil and Lakhnadon tehsil, both in Seoni district. As of 2023, its representative is Dinesh Rai Munmun of the Bharatiya Janata Party.

== Members of the Legislative Assembly ==
Year	Member	Party
1952	Dadu Mahendranath Singh	Indian National Congress
1957	Dadu Mahendranath Singh	Indian National Congress
1962	Rajkumari Prabhawati	Akhil Bharatiya Ram Rajya Parishad
1967	M. R. Jatar	Indian National Congress
1972	Nityendra Nath Sheel	Indian National Congress
1977	Prabha Bhargava	Indian National Congress
1980	Abdul Rehman Faruqui	Indian National Congress (Indira)
1985	Ramesh Chand Jain	Indian National Congress
1990	Mahesh Prasad Shukla	Bharatiya Janata Party
1993	Mahesh Prasad Shukla	Bharatiya Janata Party
1998	Naresh Diwakar	Bharatiya Janata Party
2003	Naresh Diwakar	Bharatiya Janata Party
2008	Neeta Pateriya	Bharatiya Janata Party
2013	Dinesh Rai Munmun	Independent
2018	Dinesh Rai Munmun	Bharatiya Janata Party
2023	Dinesh Rai Munmun	Bharatiya Janata Party

== Election results ==
=== 2023 ===
2023 Madhya Pradesh Legislative Assembly election: Seoni
Party	Candidate	Votes	%	±%
BJP	Dinesh Rai Munmun	116,795	50.03	+0.43
INC	Anand Panjwani	98,377	42.14	+3.5
GGP	Ranjeet Ramdas Wasnik	10,395	4.45	+1.43
NOTA	None of the above	2,703	1.16	+0.78
Majority		18,418	7.89	−3.07
Turnout		233,465	84.87	+4.92
BJP hold		Swing		

=== 2018 ===
2018 Madhya Pradesh Legislative Assembly election: Seoni
Party	Candidate	Votes	%	±%
BJP	Dinesh Rai Munmun	99,576	49.6	
INC	Mohan Singh Chandel	77,568	38.64	
GGP	Gaya Prasad Kumre	6,066	3.02	
Independent	Makbool Shah	2,536	1.26	
Independent	Tanvir Khan	2,314	1.15	
CPI	D.D. Wasnik	2,038	1.02	
NOTA	None of the above	769	0.38	
Majority		22,008	10.96	
Turnout		200,767	79.95	
BJP gain from Independent		Swing		

== See also ==
- Seoni
