= Dadu Mahendranath Singh =

Indian politician

Madhya Pradesh Legislative Assembly
- In office 1951–1962

Dadu Mahendranath Singh was an Indian politician from the state of the Madhya Pradesh. He represented Seoni Vidhan Sabha constituency in Madhya Pradesh Legislative Assembly by winning General election of 1951, 1957.
