= Ashok Nagar Assembly constituency =

Assembly constituency in Madhya Pradesh

Coordinates: 24.57°N 77.73°E

Ashok Nagar
- Constituency No. 32 for the Madhya Pradesh Legislative Assembly

Constituency details
- Country: India
- Region: Central India
- State: Madhya Pradesh
- District: Ashok Nagar
- Lok Sabha constituency: Guna
- Established: 1957
- Reservation: SC

Member of Legislative Assembly
- 16th Madhya Pradesh Legislative Assembly
- Incumbent Haribaboo Rai
- Party: INC
- Elected year: 2023
- Preceded by: Jaipal Singh Jajji

Ashok Nagar is one of the 230 Vidhan Sabha (Legislative Assembly) constituencies of Madhya Pradesh state in central India. This constituency is reserved for the candidates belonging to the Scheduled castes since 2008, following the delimitation of the Legislative Assembly constituencies. It came into existence in 1957, as one of the Vidhan Sabha constituencies of Madhya Pradesh state.

== Overview ==
Ashok Nagar (constituency number 32) is one of the 3 Vidhan Sabha constituencies located in Ashok Nagar district. This constituency presently covers the entire Ashok Nagar tehsil of the district.

Ashok Nagar is part of Guna Lok Sabha constituency along with seven other Vidhan Sabha segments, namely, Chanderi and Mungaoli in this district, Bamori and in Guna in Guna district, Shivpuri, Pichhore and Kolaras in Shivpuri district.

== Members of the Legislative Assembly ==
Election	Name	Party
1957	Dulichand	Indian National Congress
1957	Ram Dayal Singh	Indian National Congress
1962	Ram Dayal Singh	Indian National Congress
1967	Multanmal	Swatantra Party
1972	Mahendra Singh	Bharatiya Jana Sangh
1977	Chiman Lal Guljarilal	Janata Party
1980	Mahender Singh	Indian National Congress (Indira)
1985	Ravindra Singh	Indian National Congress
1990	Neelam Singh Yadav	Bharatiya Janata Party
1993	Neelam Singh Yadav	Bharatiya Janata Party
1998	Balveer Singh Kushwah	Bahujan Samaj Party
2003	Jagannath Singh Raghuwanshi	Bharatiya Janata Party
2008	Ladduram Kori	Bharatiya Janata Party
2013	Gopilal Jatav	Bharatiya Janata Party
2018	Jaipal Singh Jajji	Indian National Congress
2020^	Jaipal Singh Jajji	Bharatiya Janata Party
2023	Haribaboo Rai	Indian National Congress

^By poll

== Election results ==
=== 2023 ===
2023 Madhya Pradesh Legislative Assembly election: Ashok Nagar
Party	Candidate	Votes	%	±%
INC	Haribaboo Rai	86,180	49.87	+7.14
BJP	Jaipal Singh Jajji	77,807	45.03	−7.49
BSP	Dhanpal Berkhedi	3,055	1.77	−0.49
ASP(KR)	Ganeshram Ahirwar	2,360	1.37	
NOTA	None of the above	1,394	0.81	−0.18
Majority		8,373	4.84	−4.95
Turnout		172,799	79.07	+3.18
INC gain from BJP		Swing		

=== 2020 bypolls ===
2020 Madhya Pradesh Legislative Assembly by-elections: Ashok Nagar
Party	Candidate	Votes	%	±%
BJP	Jaipal Singh Jajji	78,479	52.52	+12.06
INC	Asha Dohare	63,849	42.73	−4.75
BSP	Stromblin T. R. Bhandari	3,373	2.26	−4.64
NOTA	None of the above	1,482	0.99	−0.46
Majority		14,630	9.79	+2.77
Turnout		149,435	75.89	+1.48
BJP gain from INC		Swing		

=== 2018 ===
2018 Madhya Pradesh Legislative Assembly election: Ashok Nagar
Party	Candidate	Votes	%	±%
INC	Jaipal Singh Jajji	65,750	47.48	
BJP	Ladduram Kori	56,020	40.46	
BSP	Balkrishna	9,559	6.9	
Sapaks Party	Devilal Thekedar	1,462	1.06	
NOTA	None of the above	2,004	1.45	
Majority		9,730	7.02	
Turnout		138,467	74.41	

== See also ==
- Ashoknagar (disambiguation)
