= Dhruv Narayan Singh =

Indian politician

Dhruv Narayan Singh (July 26, 1959) is an Indian politician active in Madhya Pradesh State of India. He was born at Rampur Baghelan in Satna district, to Govind Narayan Singh former Chief Minister of Madhya Pradesh who himself was son of first Prime Minister of Vindhya Pradesh Awadhesh Pratap Singh. He was an M.L.A. from Bhopal Madhya (Vidhan Sabha constituency) Madhya Pradesh Legislative Assembly. Dhruv Narayan Singh defeated Congress leader Nasir Islam to become MLA. In 2023 state legislative election dhruv narayana lost to arif masood by 16224 votes
