= Ram Lallu Vaishya =

Indian politician

Ram Lallu Vaishya is an Indian politician from the Bhartiya Janata Party. He was elected as the Member of Legislative Assembly of Madhya Pradesh (MLA) from Singrauli constituency in the 2018 polls. He won 4000 approximately votes defeating his immediate rival Renu Shah of Indian National Congress.
