= Rishi Agrawal =

Indian politician

Rishi Agrawal (born 1981) is an Indian politician from Madhya Pradesh, India. He is an MLA of Indian National Congress from Bamori Assembly constituency of Guna district. He won the 2023 Madhya Pradesh Legislative Assembly election. He received a total of 93,708 votes and won with the margin of 14,796 votes.
