= Naryoli Assembly constituency =

Constituency of the Madhya Pradesh legislative assembly in India

Coordinates: 23.91°N 78.59°E

Naryoli
- Constituency No. 40 for the Madhya Pradesh Legislative Assembly

Constituency details
- Country: India
- Region: Central India
- State: Madhya Pradesh
- District: Sagar
- Lok Sabha constituency: Sagar
- Established: 1976
- Reservation: SC

Member of Legislative Assembly
- 16th Madhya Pradesh Legislative Assembly
- Incumbent Pradeep Lariya
- Party: Bharatiya Janata Party
- Elected year: 2023
- Preceded by: Narayan Prasad Kabirpanthi

Naryoli (formerly, Naryaoli) is one of the 230 Madhya Pradesh Legislative Assembly constituencies of Madhya Pradesh state in central India. This constituency came into existence in 1976, following the delimitation of the Legislative Assembly constituencies. It is reserved for the candidates belonging to the Scheduled castes from its inception.

== Overview ==
Naryoli (constituency number 40) is one of the 8 Vidhan Sabha constituencies located in Sagar district. This constituency presently covers the Sagar cantonment and part of Sagar tehsil of the district. From 1976 to 2008, Sagar cantonment was part of the erstwhile Sagar constituency.

Naryoli is part of Sagar Lok Sabha constituency along with seven other Vidhan Sabha segments, namely, Bina, Khurai, Surkhi and Sagar in this district and Kurwai, Sironj and Shamshabad in Vidisha district.

== Members of the Legislative Assembly ==
Election	Name	Party
1977	Lila Dhar	Indian National Congress
1980	Uttamchand Khatik	Indian National Congress (Indira)
1985	Lokman Khatik	Indian National Congress
1990	Narayan Prasad Kabirpanthi	Bharatiya Janata Party
1993	Pyarelal Choudhary	Indian National Congress
1998	Surendra Choudhary	Indian National Congress
2003	Narayan Prasad Kabirpanthi	Bharatiya Janata Party
2008	Pradeep Lariya	Bharatiya Janata Party
2013	Pradeep Lariya	Bharatiya Janata Party
2018	Pradeep Lariya	Bharatiya Janata Party
2023	Pradeep Lariya	Bharatiya Janata Party

== Election results ==
=== 2023 ===
2023 Madhya Pradesh Legislative Assembly election: Naryoli
Party	Candidate	Votes	%	±%
BJP	Pradeep Lariya	88,202	52.02	+1.66
INC	Surendra Choudhary	73,790	43.52	−0.82
AAP	Arvind Tomar	2,124	1.25	+0.77
NOTA	None of the above	1,221	0.72	−0.68
Majority		14,412	8.5	+2.48
Turnout		169,548	71.5	+4.63
BJP hold		Swing		

=== 2018 ===
2018 Madhya Pradesh Legislative Assembly election: Naryoli
Party	Candidate	Votes	%	±%
BJP	Pradeep Lariya	74,360	50.36	
INC	Surendra Choudhary	65,460	44.34	
BSP	Yogendra Suraj Choudhary	2,393	1.62	
Bhartiya Shakti Chetna Party	Nandkishore Athya	1,517	1.03	
NOTA	None of the above	2,069	1.4	
Majority		8,900	6.02	
Turnout		147,645	66.87	
BJP gain from		Swing		

== See also ==
- Sagar Cantonment
