= Guna Assembly constituency =

Assembly constituency in Madhya Pradesh

Coordinates: 24.64°N 77.31°E

Guna
- Constituency No. 29 for the Madhya Pradesh Legislative Assembly

Constituency details
- Country: India
- Region: Central India
- State: Madhya Pradesh
- District: Guna
- Lok Sabha constituency: Guna
- Established: 1951
- Reservation: SC

Member of Legislative Assembly
- 16th Madhya Pradesh Legislative Assembly
- Incumbent Panna Lal Shakya
- Party: Bharatiya Janata Party
- Elected year: 2023
- Preceded by: Gopilal Jatav

Guna is one of the 230 Vidhan Sabha (Legislative Assembly) constituencies of Madhya Pradesh state in central India. This constituency is reserved for the candidates belonging to the Scheduled castes since 2008, following the delimitation of the Legislative Assembly constituencies. It came into existence in 1951, as one of the 79 Vidhan Sabha constituencies of the erstwhile Madhya Bharat state.

== Overview ==
Guna (constituency number 29) is one of the 4 Vidhan Sabha constituencies located in Guna district. This constituency presently covers parts of Guna and Aron tehsils of the district.

Guna is part of Guna Lok Sabha constituency along with seven other Vidhan Sabha segments, namely, Bamori in this district, Shivpuri, Pichhore and Kolaras in Shivpuri district and Ashok Nagar, Chanderi and Mungaoli in Ashoknagar district.

== Members of the Legislative Assembly ==
Madhya Bharat: Shivpuri – Kolaras
| Year | Member | Party |
|---|---|---|
| 1951 | Sitaram Tatke | Indian National Congress |

Madhya Pradesh Legislative Assembly
| Year | Member | Party |
|---|---|---|
| 1957 | Daulat Ram Kirar | Indian National Congress |
| 1962 | Brindawan Prasad | Hindu Mahasabha |
| 1967 | R. L. Premi | Swatantra Party |
| 1972 | Shiv Pratap Singh | Bharatiya Jana Sangh |
| 1977 | Dharamswarup Saxena | Janata Party |
| 1980 | Shiv Pratap Singh | Indian National Congress (Indira) |
| 1985 | Shiv Pratap Singh | Indian National Congress |
| 1990 | Bhag Chandra Sogani | Independent politician |
| 1993 | Shiv Pratap Singh | Bharatiya Janata Party |
| 1998 | Shiv Pratap Singh | Bharatiya Janata Party |
| 2003 | Kanhaiyalal Rameshwar Agarwal | Bharatiya Janata Party |
| 2008 | Rajendra Singh Saluja | Bharatiya Janshakti Party |
| 2013 | Panna Lal Shakya | Bharatiya Janata Party |
| 2018 | Gopilal Jatav | Bharatiya Janata Party |
| 2023 | Panna Lal Shakya | Bharatiya Janata Party |

== Election results ==
=== 2023 ===
2023 Madhya Pradesh Legislative Assembly election: Guna
| Party | Candidate | Votes | % | ±% |
|---|---|---|---|---|
| BJP | Panna Lal Shakya | 114,801 | 66.59 | +9.78 |
| INC | Pankaj Kaneriya | 48,347 | 28.05 | −6.03 |
| BSP | Jagveer Singh Jarsoniya | 3,468 | 2.01 | −0.8 |
| Independent | Hariom Khateek | 1,828 | 1.06 | |
| NOTA | None of the above | 1,722 | 1.0 | −0.61 |
| Majority | | 66,454 | 38.54 | +15.81 |
| Turnout | | 172,388 | 73.29 | +2.18 |
| BJP hold | | Swing | | |

=== 2018 ===
2018 Madhya Pradesh Legislative Assembly election: Guna
| Party | Candidate | Votes | % | ±% |
|---|---|---|---|---|
| BJP | Gopilal Jatav | 84,149 | 56.81 | |
| INC | Chandra Prakash Ahirwar | 50,482 | 34.08 | |
| BSP | Suresh Kumar Roshan | 4,169 | 2.81 | |
| Sapaks Party | Jagdish Khatik | 2,593 | 1.75 | |
| NOTA | None of the above | 2,390 | 1.61 | |
| Majority | | 33,667 | 22.73 | |
| Turnout | | 148,131 | 71.11 | |
| BJP gain from | | Swing | | |

== See also ==
- Guna
