= Haribaboo Rai =

Indian politician

Haribaboo Rai (born 1960) is an Indian politician from Madhya Pradesh, India. He is an MLA of Indian National Congress from Ashok Nagar Assembly constituency of Ashoknagar district which is reserved for SC community. He won the 2023 Madhya Pradesh Legislative Assembly election. He received a total of 86,180 votes and won with the margin of 8,373 votes.
