= Rajendra Pandey (Indian politician) =

Indian politician

Member of the Madhya Pradesh Legislative Assembly
- Incumbent
- Assumed office 2018
- Constituency: Jaora

Personal details
- Political party: Bharatiya Janata Party

Rajendra Pandey is an Indian politician from the Bharatiya Janata Party. He is a member of the Madhya Pradesh Legislative Assembly representing the Jaora constituency.

== See also ==
- 15th Madhya Pradesh Assembly
- 16th Madhya Pradesh Assembly
