= Bhopal Madhya Assembly constituency =

Constituency of the Madhya Pradesh legislative assembly in India

Coordinates: 23.22°N 77.43°E

Bhopal Madhya
- Constituency No. 153 for the Madhya Pradesh Legislative Assembly

Constituency details
- Country: India
- Region: Central India
- State: Madhya Pradesh
- District: Bhopal
- Lok Sabha constituency: Bhopal
- Established: 2008
- Reservation: None

Member of Legislative Assembly
- 16th Madhya Pradesh Legislative Assembly
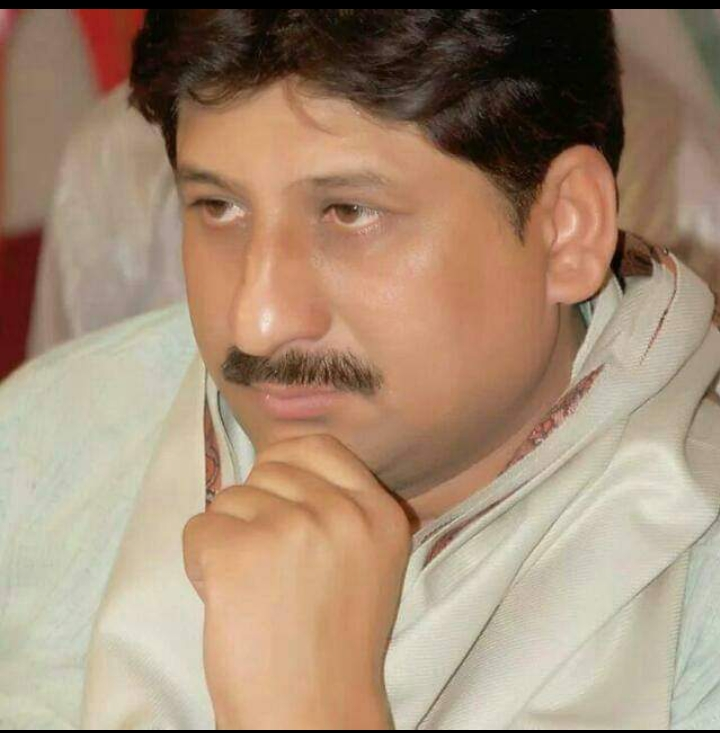
- Incumbent Arif Masood
- Party: Indian National Congress
- Elected year: 2023
- Preceded by: Surendra Nath Singh

Bhopal Madhya Assembly Constituency is one of the 230 constituencies of Madhya Pradesh. It comes under Bhopal district and Bhopal Parliamentary Constituency

== Members of the Legislative Assembly ==
Year	Name	Party
2008	Dhruv Narayan Singh	Bharatiya Janata Party
2013	Surendra Nath Singh	Bharatiya Janata Party
2018	Arif Masood	Indian National Congress
2023	Arif Masood	Indian National Congress

== Election results ==
=== 2023 ===
2023 Madhya Pradesh Legislative Assembly election: Bhopal Madhya
Party	Candidate	Votes	%	±%
INC	Arif Masood	82,371	54.33	+1.13
BJP	Dhruv Narayan Singh	66,480	43.84	+0.88
NOTA	None of the above	1,151	0.76	−0.29
Majority		15,891	10.49	+0.25
Turnout		151,626	61.24	+0.04
INC hold		Swing		

=== 2018 ===
2018 Madhya Pradesh Legislative Assembly election: Bhopal Madhya
Party	Candidate	Votes	%	±%
INC	Arif Masood	76,647	53.2	
BJP	Surendra Nath Singh	61,890	42.96	
NOTA	None of the above	1,517	1.05	
Majority		14,757	10.24	
Turnout		144,069	61.2	
INC gain from BJP		Swing		
