= Ashok Nagar, Prayagraj =

Ashok Nagar
- town
- Interactive map of Ashok Nagar
- Coordinates: 25°28′16″N 81°49′1″E
- Country: India
- State: Uttar Pradesh

Languages
  - Official: Hindi
- Time zone: UTC+5:30 (IST)
- Vehicle registration: UP

Ashok Nagar is a locality (township) of Prayagraj, Uttar Pradesh, India.

== Notable residents ==
- Mahadevi Varma
