= Panna Lal Shakya =

Indian politician

- पन्नालाल शाक्य

MLA for Guna
- Incumbent
- Assumed office 2023
- President: Draupadi Murmu
- Prime Minister: Narendra Modi
- Preceded by: Gopilal Jatav
- Constituency: Guna Assembly constituency

Personal details
- Born: Panna Lal Shakya; 1956 (age 69–70) Nayapura, Guna, Madhya Pradesh, India
- Citizenship: india
- Party: Bhartiya Janata Party
- Parent: Chhote Lal Shakya (father)
- Education: Bachelor of Arts & Master of Arts from Jiwaji University in Gwalior district of Madhya Pradesh, India
- Occupation: Politician
- Profession: Agriculturist
- Nickname: Shakya Sahib

Panna Lal Shakya is an Indian politician and social worker and incumbent member of the Madhya Pradesh Legislative Assembly as Bharatiya Janata Party politician from the Guna constituency in Guna district of Madhya Pradesh. Shakya is associated with Rashtriya Swayamsevak Sangh and belong to Koli caste of Madhya Pradesh. In 2023 Madhya Pradesh Legislative Assembly elections, Shakya defeated the Pankaj Kaneriya of Indian National Congress party by 66,454 votes.

Shakya gained controversy on 25 March 2018 after he suggested that girls should avoid having boyfriends in order to prevent assault.

== Political career ==
- 2013 - 2018, Member of Legislative Assembly for Guna Assembly constituency
- 2023 - ongoing, 2nd term Member of Legislative Assembly for Guna Assembly constituency
