= Rajesh Kumar (Madhya Pradesh politician) =

Indian politician

Rajesh Kumar Shukla

Member of the 16th Madhya Pradesh Assembly
- Incumbent
- Assumed office 2023
- Constituency: Bijawar

Personal details
- Political party: Bhartiya Janta Party
- Occupation: Politician

Rajesh Kumar Shukla Bablu Bhaiya, is an Indian politician and elected as a candidate of Bharatiya Janata Party from Bijawar Assembly. He is an MLA and joined Bhartiya Janta party on 14 June 2022.
