= Bamori Assembly constituency =

Constituency of the Madhya Pradesh legislative assembly in India

Coordinates: 24.15°N 77.02°E

Bamori
- Constituency No. 28 for the Madhya Pradesh Legislative Assembly

Constituency details
- Country: India
- Region: Central India
- State: Madhya Pradesh
- District: Guna
- Lok Sabha constituency: Guna
- Established: 2008
- Reservation: None

Member of Legislative Assembly
- 16th Madhya Pradesh Legislative Assembly
- Incumbent Rishi Agarwal
- Party: Indian National Congress
- Elected year: 2023
- Preceded by: Mahendra Singh Sisodia

Bamori Assembly constituency is one of the 230 Vidhan Sabha (Legislative Assembly) constituencies of Madhya Pradesh state in central India. This constituency came into existence in 2008, following the delimitation of the Legislative Assembly constituencies and covers mostly the area earlier covered by the erstwhile Guna and Shadora constituencies before delimitation.

== Overview ==
Bamori (constituency number 28) is one of the 4 Vidhan Sabha constituencies located in Guna district. This constituency covers part of Guna and Bamori tehsil of the district.

Bamori is part of Guna Lok Sabha constituency along with seven other Vidhan Sabha segments, namely, Guna in this district, Shivpuri, Pichhore and Kolaras in Shivpuri district and Ashok Nagar, Chanderi and Mungaoli in Ashoknagar district.

== Members of Legislative Assembly ==
Madhya Pradesh Legislative Assembly
Election	Member	Party
2008	Kanhaiyalal Rameshwar Agarwal	Bharatiya Janata Party
2013	Mahendra Singh Sisodia	Indian National Congress
2018	Mahendra Singh Sisodia	Indian National Congress
2020^	Mahendra Singh Sisodia	Bharatiya Janata Party
2023	Rishi Agarwal	Indian National Congress

^ By Poll

== Election results ==
=== 2023 ===
2023 Madhya Pradesh Legislative Assembly election: Bamori
Party	Candidate	Votes	%	±%
INC	Rishi Agrawal	93,708	51.19	+21.78
BJP	Mahendra Singh Sisodia	78,912	43.11	−18.89
BSP	Manisha Rajesh Singh Dhakad	3,496	1.91	−1.40
NOTA	None of the above	2,064	1.13	−0.13
Majority		14,796	8.08	−24.51
Turnout		183,044	81.32	+2.20
INC gain from BJP		Swing		

=== 2020 bypolls ===
2020 Madhya Pradesh Legislative Assembly by-elections: Bamori
Party	Candidate	Votes	%	±%
BJP	Mahendra Singh Sisodia	101,124	62.00	+38.41
INC	Kanhaiyalal Rameshwar Agarwal	47,971	29.41	−12.13
BSP	Ramesh Dawar	5,391	3.31	−1.30
CPI	Manohar Mirota	1,983	1.22	−0.96
NOTA	None of the above	2,058	1.26	+0.53
Majority		53,153	32.59	+14.64
Turnout		163,110	79.12	−0.48
BJP gain from INC		Swing		

=== 2018 ===
2018 Madhya Pradesh Legislative Assembly election: Bamori
Party	Candidate	Votes	%	±%
INC	Mahendra Singh Sisodia	64,598	41.54	
BJP	Brijmohan Singh Azad	36,678	23.59	
Independent	Kanhaiyalal Rameshwar Agrawal	28,488	18.32	
BSP	Omprakash Tripathi	7,176	4.61	
Independent	Ramswaroop Bhil	4,281	2.75	
CPI	Suman Devi Yogendra Sharma	3,383	2.18	
Independent	Devendra Kumar Upadhyay	3,111	2.0	
Independent	Guddi Bai Lodha	1,644	1.06	
NOTA	None of the above	1,132	0.73	
Majority		27,920	17.95	
Turnout		155,495	79.6	
INC hold		Swing		

=== 2013 ===
M. P. Legislative Assembly Election, 2013: Bamori
Party	Candidate	Votes	%	±%
INC	Mahendra Singh Sisodia	71,804	50.80	
BJP	Kanhaiyalal Rameshwar Agarwal	53,243	37.67	
BSP	Ramesh Dawar	5,946	4.21	
CPI	Yogendra Sharma	2931	2.07	
Independent	Hemant Singh Kushwah	1295	0.92	N/A
NOTA	None of the Above	2568	1.82	
Majority				
Turnout		1,41,345	77.55	
INC hold		Swing		

== See also ==
- Guna district
