= Jaipal Singh Jajji =

Indian politician

Member of Madhya Pradesh Legislative Assembly
- In office 2018–2023
- Preceded by: Gopilal Jatav
- Constituency: Ashok Nagar

Personal details
- Party: Bharatiya Janata Party
- Other political affiliations: Indian National Congress

Jaipal Singh Jajji is an Indian politician. He is a member of BJP. Jajji was a Member of Madhya Pradesh Legislative Assembly from Ashok Nagar in Ashok Nagar district from December 2018 to March 2020 and from April 2020 to November 2023.

During 2020 Madhya Pradesh political crisis, he supported senior Congress leader Jyotiraditya Scindia and was one of the 22 MLAs who resigned due to which Kamal Nath resigned from the post of Chief Minister of Madhya Pradesh, after he failed to convince the Rebel Congress MLAs, who were campaigning in a resort in Bengaluru.

== See also ==
- 2020 Madhya Pradesh political crisis
