= Ladduram Kori =

Indian politician

Ladduram Kori is an Indian politician from Ashoknagar district in Madhya Pradesh state of Republic of India. He is member of Madhya Pradesh Legislative Assembly during 2008-2013 and elected from Ashoknagar constituency. He is member of Bhartiya Janata Party. He is a resident of Village Belsara Post Rahatha, District Umaria M.P.
