= Pradeep Lariya =

Indian politician

Pradeep Lariya (born 1966) is an Indian politician from Madhya Pradesh, India. He is an MLA of Bharatiya Janata Party from Naryoli Assembly constituency of Sagar district for four terms from 2008 to the present.

In 2023 Madhya Pradesh Legislative Assembly election, he defeated Surendra Choudhary of Indian National Congress by 14,412 votes.
