= Dinesh Rai Munmun =

Indian politician

MLA of the Madhya Pradesh Legislative Assembly
- Incumbent
- Assumed office 17 December 2018
- Constituency: Seoni

President of Seoni Madhya Pradesh Bharatiya Janata Party
- In office 3 January 2018 – 17 December 2018

Personal details
- Born: 30 March 1967 (age 59) Seoni, Madhya Pradesh, India
- Party: Bharatiya Janata Party
- Children: 2
- Education: M.Com., LLB, Rani Durgavati Vishwavidyalaya

Dinesh Rai Munmun (born 3 March 1967) is an Indian politician and a MLA of the Madhya Pradesh Legislative Assembly in the Seoni. He is a member of the Bharatiya Janata Party.

He was appointed the district president of Seoni of the Bharatiya Janata Party.

== Personal life ==
Dinesh Rai Munmun was born in Seoni, Madhya Pradesh. He graduated with a Master of Commerce, Bachelor of Laws degree from Rani Durgavati Vishwavidyalaya. He is organising Janta Ki Adalat from the past 15 years.
