= Kalapipal Mandi =

Kalapipal Mandi Pankhedi
- Town and Nagar Parishad
- Nickname: Kalapipal
- Location in Madhya Pradesh, India Kalapipal Mandi (India)
- Coordinates: 23.20°N 76.85°E
- Country: India
- State: Madhya Pradesh
- Division: Ujjain (Malwa)
- District: Shajapur
- Tehsil: Kalapipal
- Lok Sabha constituency: Dewas
- Vidhan Sabha constituency: Kalapipal (No. 169)

Government
  - Type: Nagar Parishad
  - Body: Nagar Parishad Pankhedi (Kalapipal)
  - MLA: Ghanshyam Chandravanshi (Bharatiya Janata Party)

Area
  - Total: 6.28 km^{2} (2.42 sq mi)
  - Rank: 3rd in Shajapur district
- Elevation: 448 m (1,470 ft)

Population (2011)
  - Total: 11,723
  - Density: 1,870/km^{2} (4,830/sq mi)

Languages
  - Official: Hindi
  - Regional: Malvi
- Time zone: UTC+5:30 (IST)
- PIN: 465337
- Telephone code: 07360
- ISO 3166 code: IN-MP
- Vehicle registration: MP 42
- Website: shajapur.nic.in

Kalapipal Mandi (officially administered as Nagar Parishad Pankhedi) is a town, tehsil headquarters, and Nagar Parishad (municipal council) in the Shajapur district of Madhya Pradesh, India. Situated in the fertile Malwa plateau region, it serves as a major agricultural trade centre (mandi) and railway link on the Bhopal–Ujjain section of the Western Railway, connecting rural settlements to major urban centres including Bhopal, Indore, and Ujjain.

== Geography ==
Kalapipal is located at 23.20°N 76.85°E in the eastern part of Shajapur district, bordering Sehore district. The town has an average elevation of 410 to 448 metres (1,345 to 1,470 feet) above sea level. The surrounding terrain consists primarily of black cotton soil characteristic of the Malwa region, lying within the wider drainage basin of the Parbati and Chambal river systems. The town features two local lakes equipped with stop-dams that support agricultural irrigation and groundwater recharge.

== Demographics ==
As of the 2011 Census of India, the census town of Pankhedi (Kalapipal Mandi) had a population of 11,723 residing in 2,631 households across a municipal area of 6.28 km^{2}, with males constituting 6,095 (52%) and females 5,628 (48%). Including the adjacent peri-urban settlements that form the wider urban body of Nagar Parishad Pankhedi (Kalapipal Mandi), local administrative estimates place the urban population at over 25,000.

The broader Kalapipal Tehsil has a total population of 171,624 living in 28,105 households, spread across 127 villages and 77 gram panchayats (89,372 males and 82,252 females). Arniyakalan and Behrawal are the largest villages within the tehsil. Hindi is the official language, while Malvi is widely spoken as the local regional dialect.

== Economy and agriculture ==
As reflected by the suffix Mandi (market), Kalapipal's economy is primarily driven by agriculture and agro-commodity trading. The town hosts an Agricultural Produce Market Committee (Krishi Upaj Mandi Samiti), which serves farmers from over 125 surrounding villages.

Major crops traded in the Kalapipal Mandi include:

- Kharif crops: Soybean and maize.
- Rabi and cash crops: Wheat, Bengal gram (chana), lentil (masoor), mustard, onion, garlic, and coriander.

== Civic administration and infrastructure ==
=== Local government ===
Urban civic services in the town are managed by Nagar Parishad Pankhedi (Kalapipal), headed by a Chief Municipal Officer (CMO) and an elected municipal council.

At the sub-district level, Kalapipal functions as a Tehsil headquarters overseen by a Tehsildar. Because Kalapipal has not yet been constituted as a separate revenue sub-division, residents fall under the administrative and judicial jurisdiction of neighbouring Shujalpur for Sub-Divisional Magistrate (SDM) services and civil court proceedings. Local residents and civic groups have periodically petitioned for the establishment of a dedicated SDM office and Civil Court in Kalapipal to handle the tehsil's growing volume of revenue and legal cases.

=== Healthcare ===
Public healthcare in the town and surrounding rural block is anchored by the government-run Community Health Centre (CHC) Kalapipal, located near the main bus stand. The facility is empanelled under the Pradhan Mantri Jan Arogya Yojana (PMJAY) and provides primary trauma care, maternal services, and outpatient care, while complex medical referrals are directed to the District Hospital in Shajapur (32 km) or tertiary hospitals in Bhopal (78 km).

== Transport ==
=== Railways ===
Kalapipal railway station (Station Code: KPP) is located on the broad-gauge Ujjain–Bhopal section, functioning under the Ratlam railway division of the Western Railway zone. Classified as a Grade-D station with two platforms, it serves as the primary railhead for surrounding villages that lack direct rail access, such as Ganeshpur, Khokra, Kardon, Behrawal, and Kurawar.

Over 20 passenger, express, and superfast trains halt at the station, providing direct rail connectivity to Bhopal, Indore, Ujjain, Sehore, New Delhi, Jaipur, Ahmedabad, Rajkot, Ratlam, Jabalpur, Gwalior, Nagpur, and Shri Mata Vaishno Devi Katra.

=== Roadways ===
Kalapipal is located approximately 38 km north of the Indore–Bhopal state highway corridor, roughly 78 km from the state capital Bhopal and 165 km from Indore. Over 100 daily private and state bus services connect the town with Shujalpur (13 km), Sehore, Shajapur, and Bhopal.

=== Airways ===
The nearest commercial airports are: 1. Raja Bhoj Airport, Bhopal (approximately 66 km east). 2. Devi Ahilya Bai Holkar Airport, Indore (approximately 191 km southwest).

== Education ==
Kalapipal serves as an educational hub for the surrounding rural belt.

=== Higher and technical education ===
- Swargiya Rajiv Gandhi Government College, Kalapipal: Established in 1989 and affiliated with Vikram University, Ujjain, the state government college occupies a 4.18-hectare campus on Shujalpur Road. It offers three-year undergraduate degree programmes in Arts (B.A.), Commerce (B.Com), and Science (B.Sc.). Due to the town's connectivity to over 125 villages, there has been sustained local demand to upgrade the institution to offer postgraduate (PG) courses so students do not have to commute to Shujalpur or Sehore.
- Government ITI College: An Industrial Training Institute (ITI) providing vocational training in trades such as Electrician and Fitter.

=== Schools ===
Notable primary and higher secondary schools in the town include:

- Kasturba Gandhi Higher Secondary School
- Saraswati Vidya Mandir Higher Secondary School
- Sahara Public Higher Secondary School
- Tagore Convent School
- St. Teresa's Convent Higher Secondary School
- S.D. Public School
- MVM Higher Secondary School
- Natural Public Higher Secondary School

== Culture and places of interest ==
Kalapipal is home to the Prachin Siddh Teliya Hanuman Mandir, a prominent local Hindu temple situated near Sadan Khedi that attracts devotees from across the tehsil, particularly on Tuesdays, Saturdays, and during Hanuman Jayanti. Traditional Malwa festivals including Diwali, Holi, Makar Sankranti, Navratri, and Dashahara are widely celebrated across the town.

== Politics ==
Following the 2008 delimitation of constituencies, Kalapipal was established as Constituency No. 169 of the Madhya Pradesh Legislative Assembly, forming part of the Dewas (formerly Shajapur) parliamentary constituency. In the 2023 Madhya Pradesh Legislative Assembly election, Ghanshyam Chandravanshi of the Bharatiya Janata Party (BJP) was elected as the MLA, defeating incumbent Kunal Choudhary of the Indian National Congress (INC).

List of MLAs from Kalapipal Assembly Constituency
Election Year	Member	Political Party
2008	Babulal Verma	Bharatiya Janata Party
2013	Inder Singh Parmar	Bharatiya Janata Party
2018	Kunal Choudhary	Indian National Congress
2023	Ghanshyam Chandravanshi	Bharatiya Janata Party

== See also ==
- Kalapipal railway station
- Kalapipal Assembly constituency
- Shujalpur
- Shajapur district
