= Ghanshyam Chandravanshi =

Indian politician

Ghanshyam Chandravanshi (born 1984) is an Indian politician from Madhya Pradesh. He is an MLA from Kalapipal Assembly constituency in Shajapur District. He won the 2023 Madhya Pradesh Legislative Assembly election, representing the Bharatiya Janata Party.

== Early life and education ==
Chandravanshi is from Kalapipal, Shajapur District, Madhya Pradesh. He is the son of Radheshyam Chandrawanshi. He completed his M.A. in political science in 2008 at Barkatullah University, Bhopal.

== Career ==
Chandravanshi won from Kalapipal Assembly constituency in the 2023 Madhya Pradesh Legislative Assembly election representing Bharatiya Janata Party. He polled 98,216 votes and defeated his nearest rival, Kunal Choudhary of the Indian National Congress, by a margin of 11,765 votes.
