= Shujalpur Assembly constituency =

Constituency of the Madhya Pradesh legislative assembly in India

Coordinates: 23.39°N 76.71°E

Shujalpur
- Constituency No. 168 for the Madhya Pradesh Legislative Assembly

Constituency details
- Country: India
- Region: Central India
- State: Madhya Pradesh
- District: Shajapur
- Lok Sabha constituency: Dewas
- Established: 1972
- Reservation: None

Member of Legislative Assembly
- 16th Madhya Pradesh Legislative Assembly
- Incumbent Inder Singh Parmar
- Party: Bharatiya Janata Party
- Elected year: 2023
- Preceded by: Jaswant Singh Hada

Shujalpur is one of the 230 Vidhan Sabha (Legislative Assembly) constituencies of Madhya Pradesh state in central India.

== Overview ==
It comprises Gulana tehsil, and parts of Shujalpur tehsil, including the towns of Shujalpur Akodia, all in Shajapur district. As of 2023, it is represented by Inder Singh Parmar of the Bharatiya Janata Party.

== Members of the Legislative Assembly ==
=== Madhya Bharat Legislative Assembly ===
Election	Name	Party
1952	Trimbak Sadashiv Gokhale	Indian National Congress

=== Madhya Pradesh Legislative Assembly ===
Election	Name	Party
1957	Vishnucharan	Indian National Congress
1962	Vishnucharan	Indian National Congress
1967	Veerchand	Bharatiya Jana Sangh
1972	Rameshwar Dayal Sharma	Indian National Congress
1977	Shall Kumar Sharma	Janata Party
1980	Shall Kumar Sharma	Bharatiya Janata Party
1985	Vidyadhar Joshi	Indian National Congress
1990	Nemichand Jain	Bharatiya Janata Party
1993	Nemichand Jain	Bharatiya Janata Party
1998	Kedar Singh Mandloi	Indian National Congress
2003	Kunwar Phool Singh Mewara	Bharatiya Janata Party
2008	Jaswant Singh Hada	Bharatiya Janata Party
2013	Jaswant Singh Hada	Bharatiya Janata Party
2018	Inder Singh Parmar	Bharatiya Janata Party
2023	Inder Singh Parmar	Bharatiya Janata Party

== Election results ==
=== 2023 ===
2023 Madhya Pradesh Legislative Assembly election: Shujalpur
Party	Candidate	Votes	%	±%
BJP	Inder Singh Parmar	96,054	51.84	+2.73
INC	Ramveer Singh Sikarwar	82,394	44.46	−1.15
ASP(KR)	Kailasha Choodiya	2,873	1.55	
NOTA	None of the above	1,270	0.69	−0.48
Majority		13,660	7.38	+3.88
Turnout		185,301	85.08	+2.94
BJP hold		Swing		

=== 2018 ===
2018 Madhya Pradesh Legislative Assembly election: Shujalpur
Party	Candidate	Votes	%	±%
BJP	Inder Singh Parmar	78,952	49.11	
INC	Ramveer Singh Sikarwar	73,329	45.61	
BSP	Jay Shingh Mistree	2,046	1.27	
Bahujan Sangharsh Dal	Govind Singh	1,553	0.97	
NOTA	None of the above	1,881	1.17	
Majority		5,623	3.5	
Turnout		160,763	82.14	
BJP gain from		Swing		

== See also ==
- Shujalpur
