= Kalapipal railway station =

Railway station in Madhya Pradesh

Kalapipal

General information
- Location: Kalapipal Mandi, Shajapur district, Madhya Pradesh; India
- Coordinates: 23°19′59″N 76°50′06″E
- Elevation: 487 metres (1,598 ft)
- System: Indian Railways station
- Owner: Indian Railways
- Operator: Western Railway
- Line: Ujjain–Bhopal section
- Platforms: 2
- Tracks: 4

Construction
- Structure type: Standard (on ground)
- Parking: Yes

Other information
- Status: Functioning
- Station code: KPP
- Zone(s): Western Railway
- Division(s): Ratlam
Location
- Location within India Location within Madhya Pradesh

Kalapipal railway station is a railway station in Shajapur district of Madhya Pradesh. Its code is KPP. It serves Kalapipal Mandi city. The station consists of two platforms. It lacks many facilities including water and sanitation. Passenger, Express and Superfast trains halt here.
