= Inder Singh Parmar =

Indian politician

Inder Singh Parmar (born 1964) is an Indian politician from Madhya Pradesh. He is the Cabinet Minister since 25 December 2023 of Higher Education Technical Education. He is a three-time MLA representing the Bharatiya Janata Party. He won twice from Shujalpur Assembly constituency in Shajapur district after winning once from the neighbouring Kalapipal Assembly constituency in 2013. He won the 2023 Madhya Pradesh Legislative Assembly election from Shujalpur for a third term.

== Early life and education ==
Parmar is from Shujalpur, Shajapur district, Madhya Pradesh. He is the son of late Shree Bherulal Ji Parmar. He completed his L.L.B in 1993 at Madhav College, which is affiliated with Vikam University, Ujjain.

== Career ==
Parmar won from Shujalpur Assembly constituency in the 2023 Madhya Pradesh Legislative Assembly election representing Bharatiya Janata Party. He polled 96,054 votes and defeated his nearest rival, Ramveer Singh Sikarwar of the Indian National Congress, by a margin of 13,660 votes. He first became an MLA winning the 2013 Madhya Pradesh Legislative Assembly election representing the Bharatiya Janata Party from Kalapipal Assembly constituency. In 2013, he polled 75,330 votes and defeated his nearest rival, Kedarsingh Mandloi of the Indian National Congress, by a margin of 9,573 votes. Later, he shifted to Shujalpur seat and won the 2018 Madhya Pradesh Legislative Assembly election defeating Ramveer Singh Sikarwar of the Congress Party by a margin of 5,623 votes. He became an MLA for the third time retaining the seat in the 2023 Assembly election.

On 2 July 2020, he became a minister of state for school education with independent charge in the Fourth Chouhan ministry.
