= Kalapipal Assembly constituency =

Constituency of the Madhya Pradesh legislative assembly in India

Coordinates: 23.34°N 76.84°E

Kalapipal
- Constituency No. 169 for the Madhya Pradesh Legislative Assembly

Constituency details
- Country: India
- Region: Central India
- State: Madhya Pradesh
- District: Shajapur
- Lok Sabha constituency: Dewas
- Established: 2008
- Reservation: None

Member of Legislative Assembly
- 16th Madhya Pradesh Legislative Assembly
- Incumbent Ghanshyam Chandravanshi
- Party: Bhartiya Janata Party
- Elected year: 2023
- Preceded by: Kunal Choudhary

Kalapipal is one of the 230 Vidhan Sabha (Legislative Assembly) constituencies of Madhya Pradesh state in central India. It comprises Kalapipal and Polay Kalan tehsils, and parts of Shujalpur tehsil, all in Shajapur district. As of 2023, its representative is Ghanshyam Chandravanshi of the Bhartiya Janata Party.

== Members of the Legislative Assembly ==
Year	Name	Party
2008	Babulal Verma	Bharatiya Janata Party
2013	Inder Singh Parmar	Bharatiya Janata Party
2018	Kunal Choudhary	Indian National Congress
2023	Ghanshyam Chandravanshi	Bharatiya Janata Party

== Election results ==
=== 2023 ===
2023 Madhya Pradesh Legislative Assembly election: Kalapipal
Party	Candidate	Votes	%	±%
BJP	Ghanshyam Chandravanshi	98,216	50.41	+6.58
INC	Kunal Choudhary	86,451	44.37	−7.73
Independent	Chaturbhuj Tomar Advocate	4,087	2.1	
ASP(KR)	Yogesh Malviya	3,153	1.62	
NOTA	None of the above	939	0.48	−0.61
Majority		11,765	6.04	−2.23
Turnout		194,825	85.64	+4.09
BJP gain from INC		Swing		

=== 2018 ===
2018 Madhya Pradesh Legislative Assembly election: Kalapipal
Party	Candidate	Votes	%	±%
INC	Kunal Choudhary	86,249	52.1	
BJP	Babulal Verma	72,550	43.83	
NOTA	None of the above	1,809	1.09	
Majority		13,699	8.27	
Turnout		165,531	81.55	
INC gain from		Swing		

== See also ==
- Kalapipal
