= Jabalpur North Assembly constituency =

Constituency of the Madhya Pradesh legislative assembly in India

Coordinates: 23.21°N 79.94°E

Jabalpur North
- Constituency No. 98 for the Madhya Pradesh Legislative Assembly

Constituency details
- Country: India
- Region: Central India
- State: Madhya Pradesh
- District: Jabalpur
- Lok Sabha constituency: Jabalpur
- Established: 2008
- Reservation: None

Member of Legislative Assembly
- 16th Madhya Pradesh Legislative Assembly
- Incumbent Abhilash Pandey
- Party: Bharatiya Janata Party
- Elected year: 2023
- Preceded by: Vinay Saxena

Jabalpur North is one of the 230 Vidhan Sabha (Legislative Assembly) constituencies of Madhya Pradesh state in central India. It is part of Jabalpur district and Jabalpur Lok Sabha constituency. As of 2023, its representative is Abhilash Pandey of the Bharatiya Janata Party. It consists of Wards 1 to 4, 8 to 15, 19 to 26 and Ward No. 37 of Jabalpur Municipal Corporation.

== Members of the Legislative Assembly ==
Year	Member	Party
Prior to 2008: Constituency did not exist
2008	Sharad Jain	Bharatiya Janata Party
2013	Sharad Jain	Bharatiya Janata Party
2018	Vinay Saxena	Indian National Congress
2023	Abhilash Pandey	Bharatiya Janata Party

== Election results ==
=== 2023 ===
2023 Madhya Pradesh Legislative Assembly election: Jabalpur North
Party	Candidate	Votes	%	±%
BJP	Abhilash Pandey	88,419	56.09	+21.27
INC	Vinay Saxena	65,764	41.72	+6.49
NOTA	None of the above	1,418	0.9	+0.05
Majority		22,655	14.37	+13.96
Turnout		157,637	72.86	+4.4
BJP gain from INC		Swing		

=== 2018 ===
2018 Madhya Pradesh Legislative Assembly election: Jabalpur North
Party	Candidate	Votes	%	±%
INC	Vinay Saxena	50,045	35.23	
BJP	Sharad Jain	49,467	34.82	
Independent	Pn. Dheeraj Pateria	29,479	20.75	
Independent	Sitaram Sen	5,424	3.82	
BSP	Aftab Alam	1,779	1.25	
NOTA	None of the above	1,209	0.85	
Majority		578	0.41	
Turnout		142,054	68.46	
INC gain from BJP		Swing		

== See also ==
- Jabalpur
- List of constituencies of the Madhya Pradesh Legislative Assembly
