= 2023 Madhya Pradesh Legislative Assembly election =

Indian state election

- 17 November 2023

All 230 seats in the Madhya Pradesh Legislative Assembly 116 seats needed for a majority
- Opinion polls
- Turnout: 77.74% (▲2.11 pp)
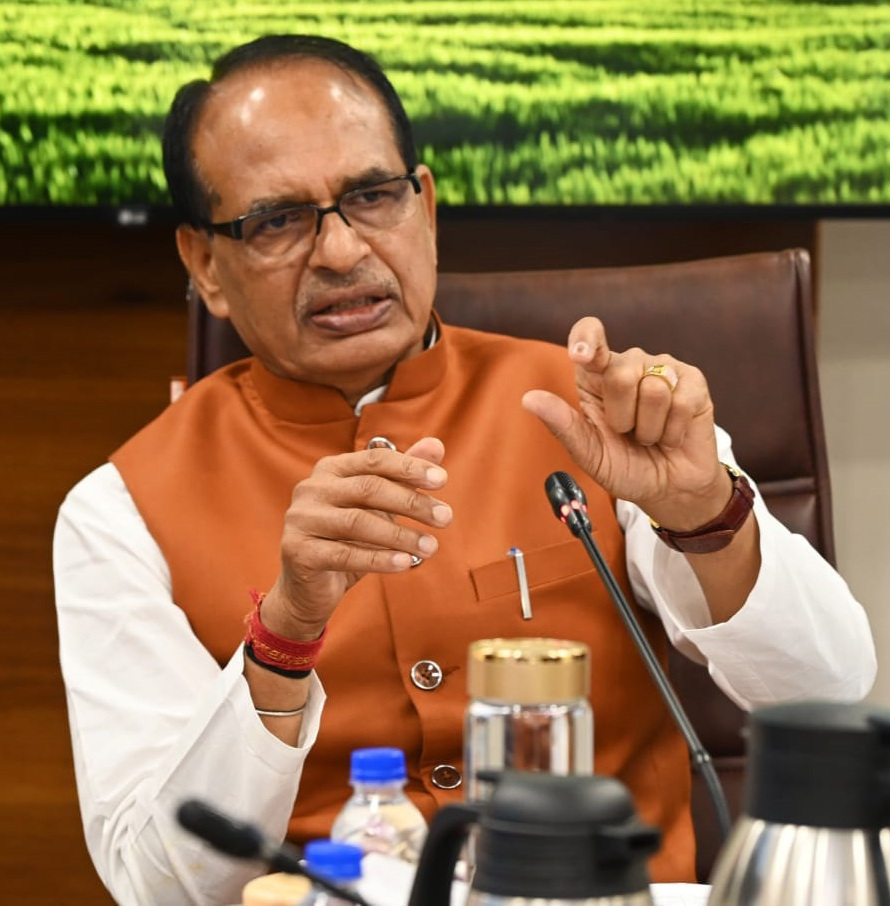

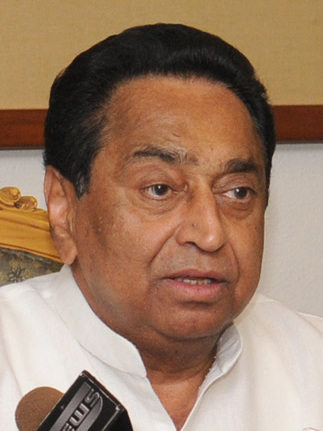
	Majority party	Minority party
Leader	Shivraj Singh Chouhan (Note: BJP did not name any chief ministerial candidate for the election. While the election campaign was led by the incumbent chief minister Chouhan, Mohan Yadav's name was announced as chief minister after the elections.)	Kamal Nath
Party	BJP	INC
Leader since	2005	2018
Leader's seat	Budhni	Chhindwara
Last election	41.02%, 109 seats	40.89%, 114 seats
Seats won	163	66
Seat change	▲54	▼48
Popular vote	2,06,58,587	1,71,88,236
Percentage	48.62%	40.45%
Swing	▲7.60 pp	▼0.44 pp
- Seatwise result map of the election

- Structure of the Madhya Pradesh Legislative Assembly after the election

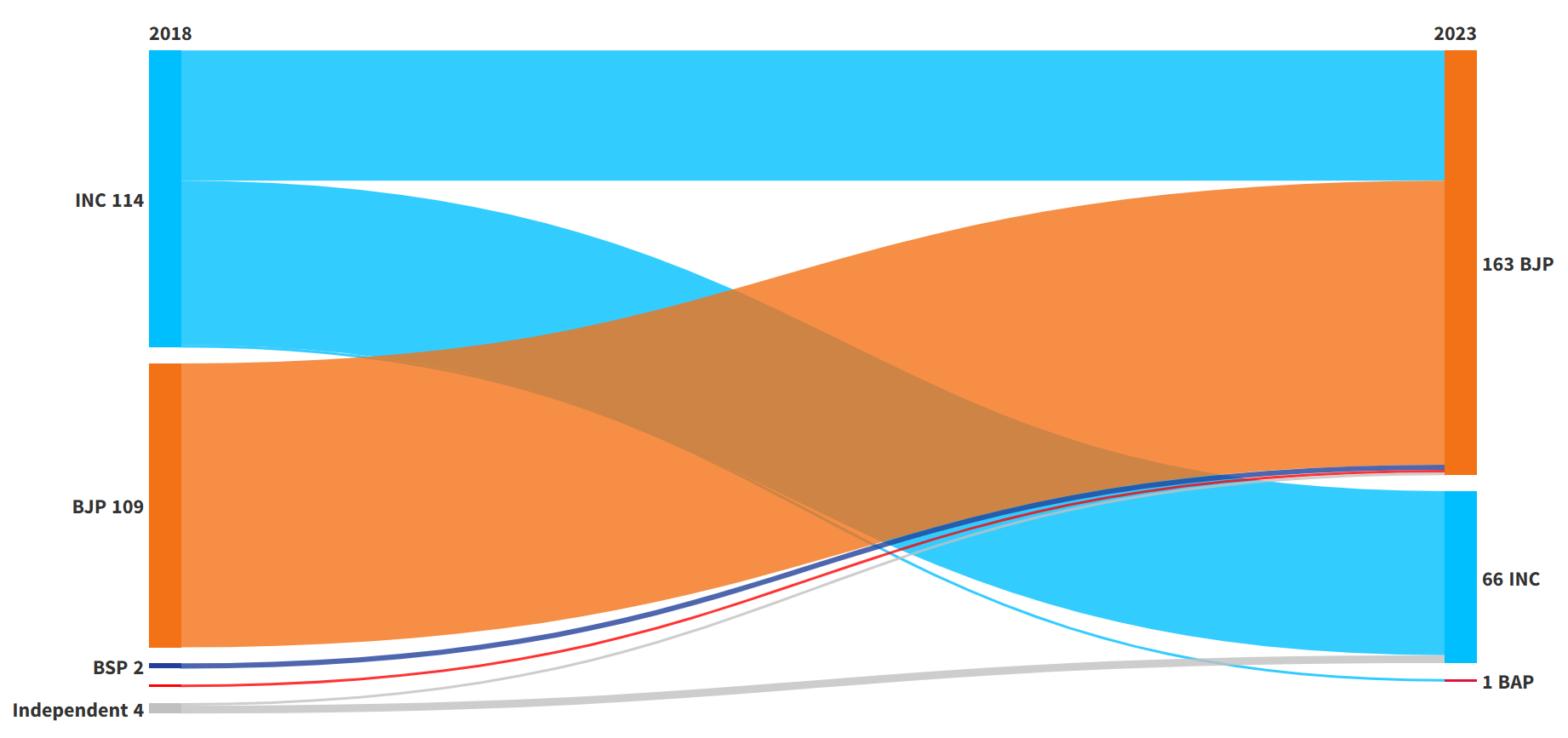
- Sankey diagram of 2023 elections in comparison to 2018 elections
Chief Minister before election
Shivraj Singh Chouhan
BJP
Chief Minister after election
Mohan Yadav
BJP

Legislative Assembly elections were held in Madhya Pradesh on 17 November 2023 to elect all 230 members of Madhya Pradesh Legislative Assembly. The results were declared on 3 December 2023.

The Bharatiya Janata Party (BJP) led by Shivraj Singh Chouhan fought the election against the Congress. BJP secured a landslide victory in the election. However, after the results were declared, Mohan Yadav, a relatively unknown face, was appointed as the chief minister by the national leadership of the BJP.

== Background ==
The tenure of the Madhya Pradesh Legislative Assembly is scheduled to end on 6 January 2024. The previous assembly elections were held in November 2018. After the election, Indian National Congress formed the state government, with Kamal Nath becoming the Chief Minister.

=== Political development ===
In March 2020, 22 Congress MLAs resigned from the assembly, and defected to Bharatiya Janata Party along with Jyotiraditya Scindia, resulting in the collapse of the state government and resignation by Chief Minister Kamal Nath. Subsequently BJP formed the state government, with Shivraj Singh Chouhan becoming Chief Minister.

=== Poll rigging and violence ===
During the voting process in 2023 Madhya Pradesh Legislative Assembly election, the murder of four people belonging to Rajput caste took place in Chakrampur village of Shivpuri district. This incident happened on 17 November 2023, when some people belonging to Kushwaha caste were allegedly trying to do frivolous voting in the favour of Indian National Congress, Kailash Kushwah at the Chakrampur polling booth in Shivpuri district. When stopped by Rajput people, who were supporters of the Bharatiya Janata Party candidate, the people belonging to Kushwaha caste allegedly surrounded them and tried to burn them alive inside their vehicle when they left the polling booth. On being unsuccessful in their attempt, the perpetrators thrashed them badly, leading to the deaths of four Rajput people belonging to the same family.

This village falls under Pohari Assembly constituency and there was massive protest by the people belonging to Rajput caste after the incident.

== Schedule ==
The schedule of the election was announced by the Election Commission of India on 9 October 2023.

Poll event	Schedule
Notification date	21 October 2023
Start of nomination	21 October 2023
Last date for filing nomination	30 October 2023
Scrutiny of nomination	31 October 2023
Last date for withdrawal of nomination	2 November 2023
Date of poll	17 November 2023
Date of counting of votes	3 December 2023

== Parties and alliances ==
Alliance/party		Flag	Symbol	Leader	Seats contested	
Bharatiya Janata Party				Shivraj Singh Chouhan	230	
Indian National Congress				Kamal Nath	230	
BSP+	Bahujan Samaj Party			Ramakant Pippal	181	218
BSP+	Gondwana Ganatantra Party			Tuleshwar Singh Markam	37	218
Azad Samaj Party (Kanshi Ram)				Chandra Shekhar Aazad	86	
Samajwadi Party				Ramayana Singh Patel	71	
Aam Aadmi Party				Rani Agrawal	66	
Janata Dal (United)				Afaque Ahmed Khan	10	
Communist Party of India				Arvind Srivastava	9	
Bharat Adivasi Party				Mohan Lal Roat	8	
All India Forward Bloc					7	
All India Majlis-e-Ittehadul Muslimeen				Sayyad Minhajuddin	4	
Communist Party of India (Marxist)				Jaswinder Singh	4	
Lok Janshakti Party (Ram Vilas)					2	
92 registered (unrecognised) parties					423	
Independent					1186	

== Candidates ==
District	Constituency					
District	Constituency		BJP		INC	
Sheopur	1	Sheopur	BJP	Durgalal Vijay	INC	Babu Jandel
Sheopur	2	Vijaypur	BJP	Baboolal Mewra	INC	Ramnivas Rawat
Morena	3	Sabalgarh	BJP	Sarla Vijendra Rawat	INC	Baijnath Kushwah
Morena	4	Joura	BJP	Subedar Singh Rajodha	INC	Pankaj Upadhyay
Morena	5	Sumawali	BJP	Adal Singh Kansana	INC	Ajab singh Kushwah
Morena	6	Morena	BJP	Raghuraj Singh Kansana	INC	Dinesh Gurjar
Morena	7	Dimani	BJP	Narendra Singh Tomar	INC	Ravindra Singh Tomar
Morena	8	Ambah (SC)	BJP	Kamlesh Jatav	INC	Devendra Ramnarayan Sakhwar
Bhind	9	Ater	BJP	Dr. Arvind Singh Bhadoria	INC	Hemant Katare
Bhind	10	Bhind	BJP	Narendra Singh Kushwah	INC	Chaudhary Rakesh Chaturvedi
Bhind	11	Lahar	BJP	Ambrish Sharma	INC	Govind Singh
Bhind	12	Mehgaon	BJP	Rakesh Shukla	INC	Rahul Bhadauria
Bhind	13	Gohad (SC)	BJP	Lal Singh Arya	INC	Keshav Desai
Gwalior	14	Gwalior Rural	BJP	Bharat Singh Kushwah	INC	Sahab Singh Gurjar
Gwalior	15	Gwalior	BJP	Pradhuman Singh Tomar	INC	Sunil Sharma
Gwalior	16	Gwalior East	BJP	Maya Singh	INC	Satish Sikarwar
Gwalior	17	Gwalior South	BJP	Narayan Singh Kushwah	INC	Praveen Pathak
Gwalior	18	Bhitarwar	BJP	Mohan Singh Rathore	INC	Lakhan Singh Yadav
Gwalior	19	Dabra (SC)	BJP	Imarti Devi	INC	Suresh Raje
Datia	20	Sewda	BJP	Pradeep Agarwal	INC	Ghanshyam Singh
Datia	21	Bhander (SC)	BJP	Ghanshyam Pironia	INC	Phool Singh Bariyya
Datia	22	Datia	BJP	INC	INC	INC
Shivpuri	23	Karera (SC)	BJP	Ramesh Prasad Khatik	INC	Pragilal Jatav
Shivpuri	24	Pohari	BJP	Suresh Dhakad	INC	Kailash Kushwah
Shivpuri	25	Shivpuri	BJP	Devendra Kumar Jain	INC	KP Singh
Shivpuri	26	Pichhore	BJP	Preetam Lodhi	INC	Arvind Singh Lodhi
Shivpuri	27	Kolaras	BJP	Mahendra Yadav	INC	Baijnath Yadav
Guna	28	Bamori	BJP	Mahendra Singh Sisodia	INC	Rishi Agarwal
Guna	29	Guna (SC)	BJP	Panna Lal Shakya	INC	Pankaj Kaneria
Guna	30	Chachoura	BJP	Priyanka Penchi	INC	Lakshman Singh
Guna	31	Raghogarh	BJP	Hirendra Singh Banti Banna	INC	Jaivardhan Singh
Ashoknagar	32	Ashok Nagar (SC)	BJP	Jajpal Singh	INC	Haribabu Rai
Ashoknagar	33	Chanderi	BJP	Jagannath Singh Raghuvanshi	INC	Gopal Singh Chauhan
Ashoknagar	34	Mungaoli	BJP	Brajendra Singh Yadav	INC	Rao Yadvendra Yadav
Sagar	35	Bina (SC)	BJP	Mahesh Rai	INC	Nirmala Sapre
Sagar	36	Khurai	BJP	Bhupendra Singh	INC	Raksha Rajput
Sagar	37	Surkhi	BJP	Govind Singh Rajput	INC	Neeraj Sharma
Sagar	38	Deori	BJP	Brijbihari Pateriya	INC	Makhanlal chaturvedi
Sagar	39	Rehli	BJP	Gopal Bhargava	INC	Jyoti Patel
Sagar	40	Naryoli	BJP	Pradeep Lariya	INC	Surendra Chaudhary
Sagar	41	Sagar	BJP	Shailendra Jain	INC	Nidhi Jain
Sagar	42	Banda	BJP	Veerendra Singh Lambardar	INC	Tarwar Singh Lodhi
Tikamgarh	43	Tikamgarh	BJP	Rakesh Giri	INC	Yadvendra Singh
Tikamgarh	44	Jatara (SC)	BJP	Harishankar Khatik	INC	Kiran Ahirwar
Niwari	45	Prithvipur	BJP	Dr. Shishupal Yadav	INC	Nitendra Singh Rathore
Niwari	46	Niwari	BJP	Anil Jain	INC	Amit Rai
Tikamgarh	47	Khargapur	BJP	Rahul Singh Lodhi	INC	Chanda Singh Gaur
Chhatarpur	48	Maharajpur	BJP	Kamakhya Pratap Singh	INC	Neeraj Dikshit
Chhatarpur	49	Chandla (SC)	BJP	Dilip Ahirwar	INC	Harprasad Anuragi
Chhatarpur	50	Rajnagar	BJP	Arvind Pateriya	INC	Vikram Singh Nati Raja
Chhatarpur	51	Chhatarpur	BJP	Lalita Yadav	INC	Alok Chaturvedi
Chhatarpur	52	Bijawar	BJP	Rajesh Kumar Shukla	INC	Charan Singh Yadav
Chhatarpur	53	Malhara	BJP	Pradyuman Singh Lodhi	INC	Bahin Ramsiya Bharti
Damoh	54	Pathariya	BJP	Lakhan Patel	INC	Rao Brajendra Singh
Damoh	55	Damoh	BJP	Jayant Kumar Malaiya	INC	Ajay Tandon
Damoh	56	Jabera	BJP	Dharmendra Singh Lodhi	INC	Pratap Singh Lodhi
Damoh	57	Hatta (SC)	BJP	Uma Khatik	INC	Pradeep Khatik
Panna	58	Pawai	BJP	Prahlad Lodhi	INC	Mukesh Nayak
Panna	59	Gunnaor (SC)	BJP	Rajesh Kumar Verma	INC	Jeevan Lal Siddharth
Panna	60	Panna	BJP	Brijendra Pratap Singh	INC	Bharat Milan Pandey
Satna	61	Chitrakoot	BJP	Surendra Singh Gaharwar	INC	Neelanshu Chaturvedi
Satna	62	Raigaon (SC)	BJP	Pratima Bagri	INC	Dr.Kalpana Verma
Satna	63	Satna	BJP	Ganesh Singh	INC	Siddharth Kushwah
Satna	64	Nagod	BJP	Nagendra Singh	INC	Dr. Rashmi Singh Patel
Satna	65	Maihar	BJP	Srikant Chaturvedi	INC	Dharmesh Ghai
Satna	66	Amarpatan	BJP	Ramkhelawan Patel	INC	Rajendra Kumar Singh
Satna	67	Rampur-Baghelan	BJP	Vikram Singh	INC	Ramashankar Pyasi
Rewa	68	Sirmour	BJP	Divyaraj Singh	INC	Ramgarib Kol
Rewa	69	Semariya	BJP	K. P. Tripathi	INC	Abhay Mishra
Rewa	70	Teonthar	BJP	Siddharth Tiwari	INC	Ramashankar Singh Patel
Rewa	71	Mauganj	BJP	Pradeep Patel	INC	Sukhendra Singh Banna
Rewa	72	Devtalab	BJP	Girish Gautam	INC	Padmesh Gautam
Rewa	73	Mangawan (SC)	BJP	Nagendra Prajapati	INC	Babita Saket
Rewa	74	Rewa	BJP	Rajendra Shukla	INC	Rajendra Sharma
Rewa	75	Gurh	BJP	Nagendra Singh	INC	Kapidhwaj Singh
Sidhi	76	Churhat	BJP	Shardendu Tiwari	INC	Ajay Arjun Singh
Sidhi	77	Sidhi	BJP	Riti Pathak	INC	Gyan Singh
Sidhi	78	Sihawal	BJP	Vishwamitra Pathak	INC	Kamleshwar Patel
Singrauli	79	Chitrangi (ST)	BJP	Radha Singh	INC	Manik Singh
Singrauli	80	Singrauli	BJP	Ramniwas Shah	INC	Renu Shah
Singrauli	81	Devsar (SC)	BJP	Rajendra Meshram	INC	Bansmani Prasad Verma
Sidhi	82	Dhauhani (ST)	BJP	Kunwar Singh Tekam	INC	Kamlesh Singh
Shahdol	83	Beohari (ST)	BJP	Sharad Juglal Kol	INC	Ramlakhan Singh
Shahdol	84	Jaisingnagar (ST)	BJP	Manisha Singh (politician)	INC	Narendra Maravi
Shahdol	85	Jaitpur (ST)	BJP	Jaisingh Maravi	INC	Uma Dhurvey
Anuppur	86	Kotma	BJP	Dilip Jaiswal	INC	Sunil Saraf
Anuppur	87	Anuppur (ST)	BJP	Bisahulal Singh	INC	Ramesh Singh
Anuppur	88	Pushprajgarh (ST)	BJP	Herrasingh Shyam	INC	Phundelal Singh Marko
Umaria	89	Bandhavgarh (ST)	BJP	Shivnarayan Singh	INC	Savitri Singh
Umaria	90	Manpur (ST)	BJP	Meena Singh	INC	Tilak Raj Singh
Katni	91	Badwara (ST)	BJP	Dhirendra Singh	INC	Vijay Raghavendra Singh
Katni	92	Vijayraghavgarh	BJP	Sanjay Pathak	INC	Neeraj Baghel
Katni	93	Murwara	BJP	Sandeep Jaiswal	INC	Mithlesh Jain
Katni	94	Bahoriband	BJP	Pranay Prabhat Pandey	INC	Saurabh Singh
Jabalpur	95	Patan	BJP	Ajay Vishnoi	INC	Neelesh Awasthi
Jabalpur	96	Bargi	BJP	Neeraj Thakur	INC	Sanjay Yadav
Jabalpur	97	Jabalpur East (SC)	BJP	Anchal Sonkar	INC	Lakhan Gahngahuria
Jabalpur	98	Jabalpur North	BJP	Abhilash Pandey	INC	Vinay Saxena
Jabalpur	99	Jabalpur Cantonment	BJP	Ashok Rohani	INC	Abhishek Chaukse Chintu
Jabalpur	100	Jabalpur West	BJP	Rakesh Singh	INC	Tarun Bhanot
Jabalpur	101	Panagar	BJP	Sushil Kumar Tiwari	INC	Rajesh Patel
Jabalpur	102	Sihora (ST)	BJP	Santosh Barbade	INC	Ekta Thakur
Dindori	103	Shahpura (ST)	BJP	Omprakash Dhurwey	INC	Bhupendra Maravi
Dindori	104	Dindori (ST)	BJP	Pankaj Tekam	INC	Omkar Singh Markram
Mandla	105	Bichhiya (ST)	BJP	Vijay Anand Marawi	INC	Narayan Singh Patta
Mandla	106	Niwas (ST)	BJP	Faggan Singh Kulaste	INC	Chain Singh Warkade
Mandla	107	Mandla (ST)	BJP	Sampatia Uikey	INC	Dr Ashok Marskole
Balaghat	108	Baihar (ST)	BJP	Bhagat Singh Netam	INC	Sanjay Uikey
Balaghat	109	Lanji	BJP	Rajkumar Karrahe	INC	Adv. Heera Kanware
Balaghat	110	Paraswada	BJP	Ramkishor Kaware	INC	Madhu Bhagat
Balaghat	111	Balaghat	BJP	Gaurishankar Bisen	INC	Anubha Munjare
Balaghat	112	Waraseoni	BJP	Pradeep Jaiswal	INC	Vicky Patel
Balaghat	113	Katangi	BJP	Gaurav Pardhi	INC	Bodh Singh Bhagat
Seoni	114	Barghat (ST)	BJP	Kamal Maskole	INC	Arjun Singh Kakodia
Seoni	115	Seoni	BJP	Dinesh Rai Munmun	INC	Anand Panjwani
Seoni	116	Keolari	BJP	Rakesh Pal Singh	INC	Rajneesh Singh
Seoni	117	Lakhnadon (ST)	BJP	Vijay Uike	INC	Yogendra Singh
Narsinghpur	118	Gotegaon (SC)	BJP	Mahendra Nagesh	INC	Narmada Prasad Prajapati
Narsinghpur	119	Narsingpur	BJP	Prahlad Singh Patel	INC	Lakhan Singh Patel
Narsinghpur	120	Tendukheda	BJP	Vishwanath Singh	INC	Sanjay Sharma
Narsinghpur	121	Gadarwara	BJP	Uday Pratap Singh	INC	Sunita Patel
Chhindwara	122	Junnardeo (ST)	BJP	Nathan Shah	INC	Sunil Uikey
Chhindwara	123	Amarwara (ST)	BJP	Monika Batti	INC	Kamlesh Shah
Chhindwara	124	Chourai	BJP	Lakhan Verma	INC	Rahul Verma
Chhindwara	125	Saunsar	BJP	Nanabhau Mohod	INC	Vijay Chaure
Chhindwara	126	Chhindwara	BJP	Vivek Bunty Sahu	INC	Kamal Nath
Chhindwara	127	Parasia (SC)	BJP	Jyoti Daheriya	INC	Sohan Valmiki
Chhindwara	128	Pandhurna (ST)	BJP	Prakash Uikey	INC	Nilesh Uike
Betul	129	Multai	BJP	Chandrashekhar Deshmukh	INC	Sukhdev Panse
Betul	130	Amla	BJP	Dr. Yogesh Pandagre	INC	Manoj Malve
Betul	131	Betul	BJP	Hemant Vijay Khandelwal	INC	Nilay Daga
Betul	132	Ghoradongri (ST)	BJP	Ganga Sajjan Singh Uikey	INC	Rahul Uike
Betul	133	Bhainsdehi (ST)	BJP	Mahendra Singh Chouhan	INC	Dharmu Singh Sirsam
Harda	134	Timarni (ST)	BJP	Sanjay Shah	INC	Abhijeet Shah
Harda	135	Harda	BJP	Kamal Patel	INC	Ram Kishore Dogne
Hoshangabad	136	Seoni-Malwa	BJP	Premshankar Verma	INC	Ajay Balram Patel
Hoshangabad	137	Hoshangabad	BJP	Sitasharan Sharma	INC	Girija Shankar Sharma
Hoshangabad	138	Sohagpur	BJP	Vijaypal Singh	INC	Pushparaj Singh
Hoshangabad	139	Pipariya (SC)	BJP	Thakur Das Nagvanshi	INC	Guru Charan Khare
Raisen	140	Udaipura	BJP	Narendra Shivaji Patel	INC	Devendra Patel Gadarwas
Raisen	141	Bhojpur	BJP	Surendra Patwa	INC	Rajkumar Patel
Raisen	142	Sanchi (SC)	BJP	Dr. Prabhuram Choudhary	INC	Dr GC Gautam
Raisen	143	Silwani	BJP	Rampal Singh	INC	Devendra Patel
Vidisha	144	Vidisha	BJP	Mukesh Tandon	INC	Shashank Bhargav
Vidisha	145	Basoda	BJP	Harisingh Raghuvanshi	INC	Nishank Jain
Vidisha	146	Kurwai (SC)	BJP	Harisingh Sapre	INC	Rani Ahirwar
Vidisha	147	Sironj	BJP	Umakant Sharma	INC	Gagnendra Raghuvanshi
Vidisha	148	Shamshabad	BJP	Surya Prakash Meena	INC	Sindhu Vikram Singh
Bhopal	149	Berasia (SC)	BJP	Vishnu Khatri	INC	Jayshree Harikiran
Bhopal	150	Bhopal Uttar	BJP	Alok Sharma	INC	Md.Atif Aqeel
Bhopal	151	Narela	BJP	Vishvas Sarang	INC	Manoj Shukla
Bhopal	152	Bhopal Dakshin-Paschim	BJP	Bhagwan Das Sabnani	INC	PC Sharma
Bhopal	153	Bhopal Madhya	BJP	Dhruv Narayan Singh	INC	Arif Masood
Bhopal	154	Govindpura	BJP	Krishna Gaur	INC	Ravindra Sahu
Bhopal	155	Huzur	BJP	Rameshwar Sharma	INC	Naresh Gyanchandani
Sehore	156	Budhni	BJP	Shivraj Singh Chouhan	INC	Vikram Mastal
Sehore	157	Ashta (SC)	BJP	Gopal Singh	INC	Kamal Chauhan
Sehore	158	Ichhawar	BJP	Karan Singh Verma	INC	Shailendra Patel
Sehore	159	Sehore	BJP	Sudesh Rai	INC	Shashank Saxena
Rajgarh	160	Narsinghgarh	BJP	Mohan Sharma	INC	Girish Bhandari
Rajgarh	161	Biaora	BJP	Narayan Singh Panwar	INC	Purshottam Dangi
Rajgarh	162	Rajgarh	BJP	Harihar kumar sahoo	INC	Bapu Singh Tanwar
Rajgarh	163	Khilchipur	BJP	Hajari Lal Dangi	INC	Priyavrat Singh
Rajgarh	164	Sarangpur (SC)	BJP	Gotam Tetwal	INC	Kala Mahesh Malviya
Agar Malwa	165	Susner	BJP	Vikram Singh Rana	INC	Bheru Singh Bapu
Agar Malwa	166	Agar (SC)	BJP	Dr. Madhu Gehlot	INC	Vipin Wankhede
Shajapur	167	Shajapur	BJP	Arun Bhimawat	INC	Hukum Singh Karada
Shajapur	168	Shujalpur	BJP	Inder Singh Parmar	INC	Ramveer Singh Sikarwar
Shajapur	169	Kalapipal	BJP	Ghanshyam Chandravanshi	INC	Kunal Choudhary
Dewas	170	Sonkatch (SC)	BJP	Rajesh Sonkar	INC	Sajjan Singh Verma
Dewas	171	Dewas	BJP	Gayatri Raje Pawar	INC	Pardeep Chaudhary
Dewas	172	Hatpipliya	BJP	Manoj Choudhary	INC	Rajveer Singh Bhagel
Dewas	173	Khategaon	BJP	Ashish Govind Sharma	INC	Deepak Joshi
Dewas	174	Bagli (ST)	BJP	Murali Bhanwara	INC	Gopal Bhonsale
Khandwa	175	Mandhata	BJP	Narayan Patel	INC	Uttam Pal Singh
Khandwa	176	Harsud (ST)	BJP	Dr. Kunwar Vijay Shah	INC	Sukhram Salve
Khandwa	177	Khandwa (SC)	BJP	Kanchan Mukesh Tanve	INC	Kundan Malviya
Khandwa	178	Pandhana (ST)	BJP	Chaya More	INC	Rupali Bare
Burhanpur	179	Nepanagar (ST)	BJP	Sushree Manju Rajendra Dadu	INC	Gendu Bai Chauhan
Burhanpur	180	Burhanpur	BJP	Archna Chitnis	INC	Thakur Surendra Singh as "Shera"
Khargone	181	Bhikangaon (ST)	BJP	Nanda Brahmane	INC	Jhuma Solanki
Khargone	182	Barwah	BJP	Sachin Birla	INC	Narendra Patel
Khargone	183	Maheshwar (SC)	BJP	Rajkumar Mev	INC	Vijayalaxmi Sadho
Khargone	184	Kasrawad	BJP	Atmaram Patel	INC	Sachin Yadav
Khargone	185	Khargone	BJP	Balkrishna Patidar	INC	Ravi Joshi
Khargone	186	Bhagwanpura (ST)	BJP	Chandra Singh Vamkle	INC	Kedar Chidabhai Dawar
Barwani	187	Sendhawa (ST)	BJP	Antar Singh Arya	INC	Montu Solanki
Barwani	188	Rajpur (ST)	BJP	Antar Singh Patel	INC	Bala Bachchan
Barwani	189	Pansemal (ST)	BJP	Shyam Barde	INC	Chandrabhaga Kirade
Barwani	190	Barwani (ST)	BJP	Premsingh Patel	INC	Rajan Mandloi
Alirajpur	191	Alirajpur (ST)	BJP	Nagar Singh Chouhan	INC	Mukesh Patel
Alirajpur	192	Jobat (ST)	BJP	Vishal Rawat	INC	Sena Mahesh Patel
Jhabua	193	Jhabua (ST)	BJP	Bhanu Bhuriya	INC	Vikrant Bhuria
Jhabua	194	Thandla (ST)	BJP	Kalsingh Bhabar	INC	Veer Singh Bhuria
Jhabua	195	Petlawad (ST)	BJP	Nirmala Bhuriya	INC	Wal Singh Meda
Dhar	196	Sardarpur (ST)	BJP	Vel Singh Bhuria	INC	Pratap Grewal
Dhar	197	Gandhwani (ST)	BJP	Sardar Singh Mehda	INC	Umang Singhar
Dhar	198	Kukshi (ST)	BJP	Jaydeep Patel	INC	Surendra Singh Baghel Honey
Dhar	199	Manawar (ST)	BJP	Shivaram Kannoj	INC	Dr Hiralal Alawa
Dhar	200	Dharampuri (ST)	BJP	Kalu Singh Thakur	INC	PanchiLal Meda
Dhar	201	Dhar	BJP	Neena Verma	INC	Prabha Gautam
Dhar	202	Badnawar	BJP	Rajvardhan Singh Dattigaon	INC	Bhawarsingh Shekhawat
Indore	203	Depalpur	BJP	Manoj Patel	INC	Vishal Patel
Indore	204	Indore-1	BJP	Kailash Vijayvargiya	INC	Sanjay Shukla
Indore	205	Indore-2	BJP	Ramesh Mendola	INC	Chintamani Chaukse Chintu
Indore	206	Indore-3	BJP	Rakesh Golu Shukla	INC	Deepak Pintu Joshi
Indore	207	Indore-4	BJP	Malini Gaur	INC	Raja Mandhwani
Indore	208	Indore-5	BJP	Mahendra Hardia	INC	Satyanarayan Patel
Indore	209	Dr. Ambedkar Nagar-Mhow	BJP	Usha Thakur	INC	Ramkishor Shukla
Indore	210	Rau	BJP	Madhu verma	INC	Jitu Patwari
Indore	211	Sanwer (SC)	BJP	Tulsi Silawat	INC	Reena Baurasi Setiya
Ujjain	212	Nagda-Khachrod	BJP	Tej Bahadur Singh Chauhan	INC	Dilip Singh Gurjar
Ujjain	213	Mahidpur	BJP	Bahadur Singh Chauhan	INC	Dinesh Jain Boss
Ujjain	214	Tarana (SC)	BJP	Tarachand Goyal	INC	Mahesh Parmar
Ujjain	215	Ghatiya (SC)	BJP	Satish Malviya	INC	Ramlal Malviya
Ujjain	216	Ujjain North	BJP	Anil Kaluheda	INC	Maya Rajesh Trivedi
Ujjain	217	Ujjain South	BJP	Dr. Mohan Yadav	INC	Chetan Premnarayan Yadav
Ujjain	218	Badnagar	BJP	Jitendra Pandya	INC	Murli morwal
Ratlam	219	Ratlam Rural (ST)	BJP	Mathuralal Damar	INC	Lakshman Dindore
Ratlam	220	Ratlam City	BJP	Chetanya Kumar Kashyap	INC	Paras Saklecha
Ratlam	221	Sailana	BJP	Sangeeta Charel	INC	Harsh Vijay Gehlot
Ratlam	222	Jaora	BJP	Rajendra Pandey	INC	Himmat Shrimal
Ratlam	223	Alot (SC)	BJP	Chintamani Malviya	INC	Manoj Chawla
Mandsaur	224	Mandsour	BJP	Yashpal Singh Sisodia	INC	Vipin Jain
Mandsaur	225	Malhargarh (SC)	BJP	Jagdish Deora	INC	Parshuram Sisodia
Mandsaur	226	Suwasra	BJP	Hardeep Singh Dang	INC	Rakesh Patidar
Mandsaur	227	Garoth	BJP	Chandar Singh Sisodia	INC	Subhash Sojatia
Neemuch	228	Manasa	BJP	Aniruddha Maroo	INC	Narendra Nahata
Neemuch	229	Neemuch	BJP	Dilip Singh Parihar	INC	Umrao Singh Gurjar
Neemuch	230	Jawad	BJP	Om Prakash Sakhlecha	INC	Samandar Patel

== Campaigns ==
=== Bharatiya Janata Party ===
Union Minister for Co-operation and Home Affairs and former BJP President Amit Shah launched his party's campaign for 2023 Madhya Pradesh Legislative Assembly election on 30 July 2023 at a huge political rally in Indore. Shah called upon the party workers and the crowd to break all the previous records of victory in the elections.

The BJP Madhya Pradesh announced its manifesto on 11 November 2023.

==== Manifesto ====
- Agriculture
1. Procurement of wheat at ₹2,700 and paddy at ₹3,100 per quintal from farmers
2. ₹12,000 to farmers every year under the Kisan Samman Nidhi and Kisan Kalyaan Yojana
- Education
1. Free education to every school student till Class 12th
2. To open Eklavya Vidyalaya (school) in ST block
- Electricity
1. 100 Units of electricity only for ₹100
- Health
1. To build a medical college in ST dominated districts
2. Nutritious breakfast along with mid-day-meal in government schools
3. ₹20,000 crore investment in health sector to make "high-tech" hospitals. Number of beds in the ICU to double
4. Establishing medical colleges in every Lok Sabha seat and add 2,000 more seats in 5 years
- Housing
1. Mukhya Mantri Jan Awas Yojana to be launched in the state. Under the scheme, homes will be provided to the poor strata of the society.
- LPG
1. Cylinder for ₹450
- Ration
1. Free ration to the poor for the next five years
- Transportation
1. Modernisation of 80 railway stations. Inclusion of Vande Metro, Vande Bharat sleeper train. Build airport at Singrol and Shehdol
2. Build six new expressway
- Tribal community
1. ₹3 lakh for the empowerment of tribal community
- Women
1. Skill development activities for 15 lakh women from villages
2. Girl child to be provided a total of ₹2 lakh ($2,400) until she attains the age of 21 years
3. Beneficiaries of the Ladli Behna Scheme to be provided financial assistance, along with a pucca house
4. Girls students from needy families to be provided free education "from KG to PG (post graduate)

=== Indian National Congress ===
Congress General Secretary Priyanka Gandhi launched her party's campaign at a huge rally in Jabalpur on 12 June 2023, hitting out at the BJP over scams and unfulfilled promises of jobs. She also announced the 5 guarantees of the Congress Party to the people of Madhya Pradesh.

The Madhya PCC released its manifesto which included seven rights and fifty-nine promises on 17 October 2023.

The party's campaign slogan for the election was "Congress ayegi, khushhali layegi" (Congress will usher in happiness).

==== Manifesto ====
- Agriculture
1. Farm waiver loans up to ₹2 lakh ($2,400)
2. Wheat will be bought from farmers at ₹2,600 per quintal, rice at ₹2,500 per quintal
3. Purchase of cow dung from farmers at ₹2 per kg
4. 10,000 cow shelters
- Education
1. Free school education to students
- Electricity
1. Free electricity up to 100 units, and half bill up to 200 units
- Employment
1. Filling of 2 lakh government job vacancies
2. Creation of 1 lakh new posts in villages
3. Make the state an industrial hub
- Health
1. Passage of Right to Health law ensuring ₹25 lakh ($30,000) health insurance cover and accidental cover of ₹10 lakh ($12,000) for all people
- LPG
1. Cylinder for ₹500
- Reservation
1. 25% reservation to OBCs
2. A caste census will be held
- Religion
1. Construction of Ram Van Gaman Path will be resumed
- Seniors
1. Restoration of Old Pension Scheme for government employees
- Sports
1. Formation of a state IPL cricket team
- Technology
1. Formation of an artificial intelligence centre
- Women
1. Pension of ₹1,500 per month to every woman
2. Provision of ₹1.01 lakh ($1,215) on marriage of each girl from poor family
3. Provision of ₹2.51 lakh ($3,015) to girls from birth to marriage under Meri Bitiya Rani scheme
4. Loans up to ₹25 lakh ($30,000) to women-led startups
5. 5,000 sq. ft plots to homeless women in rural areas
- Youth
1. Pension ranging from ₹1,500 to ₹3,000 per month to unemployed youth
2. Provision of ₹500 to ₹1,500 per month to students of grade 1 to 12 under Padho-Padhao Yojana

== Voting ==
=== Vote from home ===
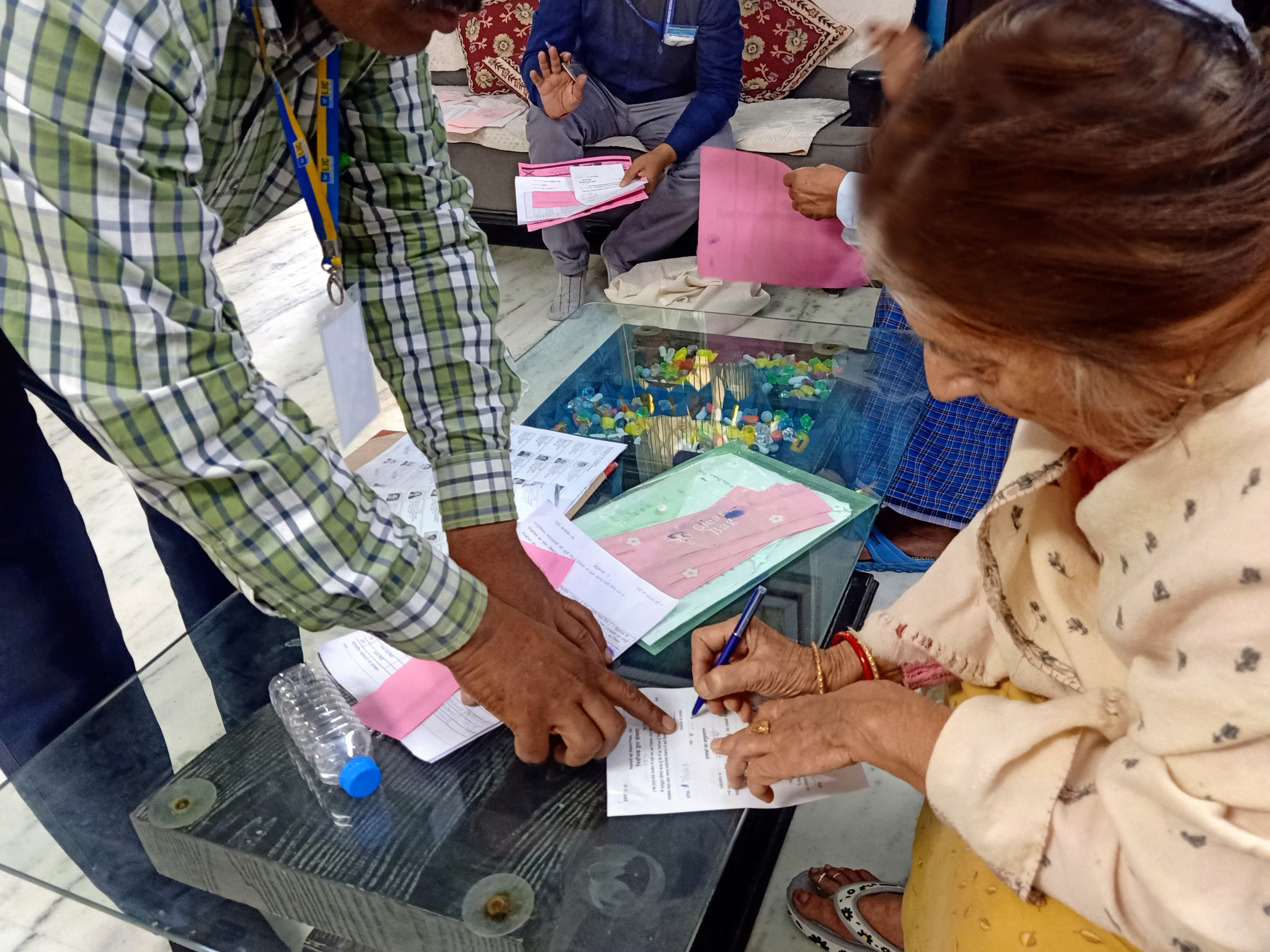
A senior citizen above 80 with ballot paper

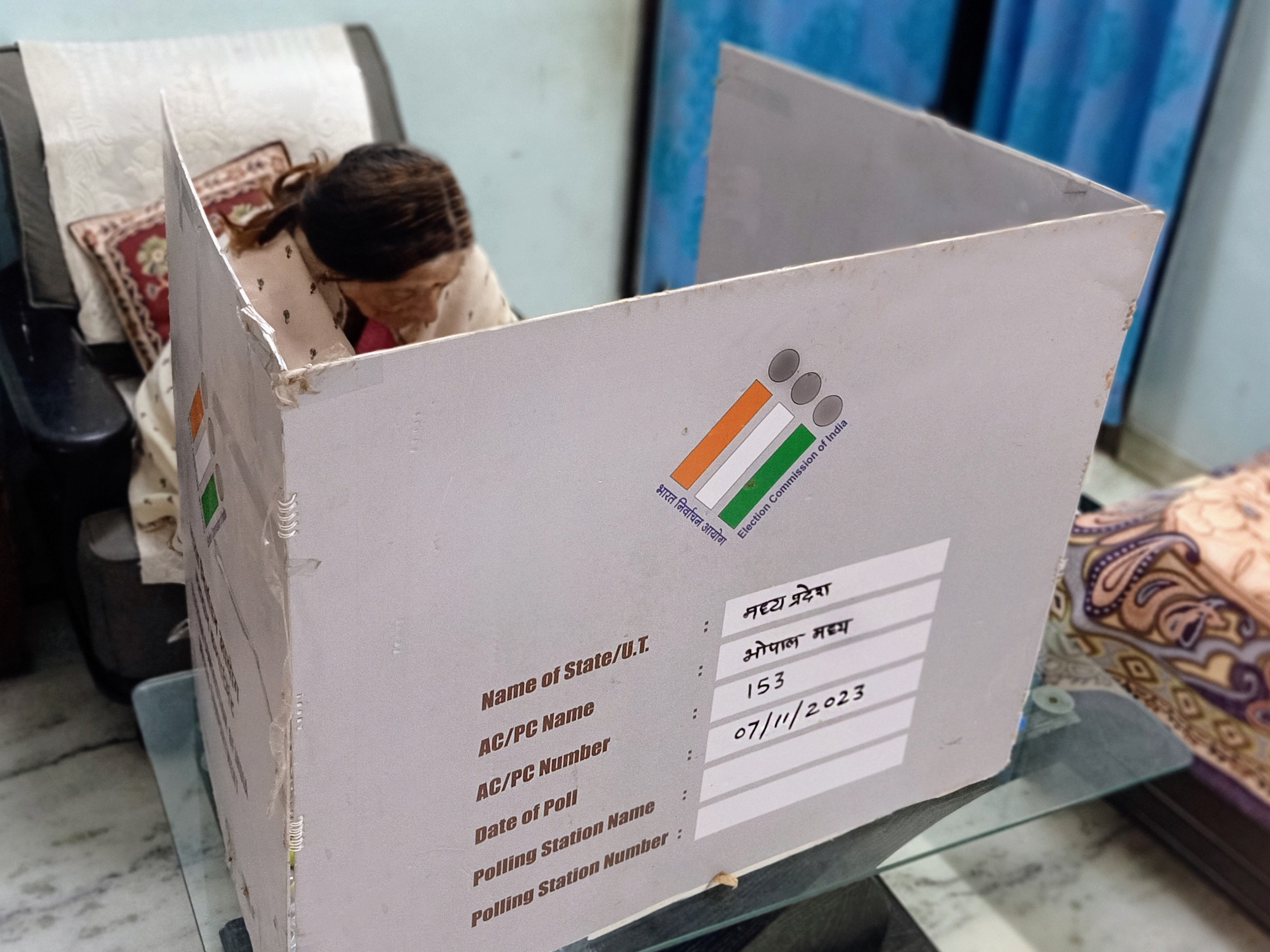
A senior citizen above 80 casting her vote from home in Bhopal

The Election Commission of India granted permission for individuals aged 80 and above and those with physical challenges to cast their votes from their homes using ballot papers.

== Surveys and polls ==
=== Opinion polls ===
Seat share
Polling agency	Date published	Margin of error	Sample size				Majority
Polling agency	Date published	Margin of error	Sample size	BJP	INC	Others	Majority
ABP News-CVoter	27 June 2023	±3–5%	17,113	106-118	108-120	0-5	Hung
ABP News-CVoter	9 October 2023	±3–5%	38,343	104-116	113-125	0-5	Hung
India TV-CNX	3 November 2023	±3%	14,520	119	107	4	BJP
ABP News-CVoter	4 November 2023	±3–5%	28,323	99-111	118-130	1-5	INC

Vote share
Polling agency	Date published	Margin of error	Sample size				Lead
Polling agency	Date published	Margin of error	Sample size	BJP	INC	Others	Lead
ABP News-CVoter	27 June 2023	±3–5%	17,113	44%	44%	12%	0%
ABP News-CVoter	9 October 2023	±3–5%	38,343	44.7%	44.6%	10.7%	0.1%
India TV-CNX	3 November 2023	±3%	14,520	46.3%	43.2%	10.4%	3.1%
ABP News-CVoter	4 November 2023	±3–5%	28,323	42.1%	44.3%	13.6%	2.2%

=== Exit polls ===
Exit polls were released on 30 November 2023.

Polling agency				Majority
Polling agency	BJP	INC	Others	Majority
India Today-Axis My India	140-162	68-90	0-3	BJP
TV9 Bharatvarsh-Polstrat	106-116	111-121	0-6	Hung
Republic TV-Matrize	118-130	97-107	0-2	BJP
People's Insight	201	29	0	BJP
Times Now-ETG	105-117	109-125	1-5	Hung
Jan Ki Baat	100-123	102-125	5	Hung
ABP News-CVoter	88-112	113-137	2-8	Hung
India TV-CNX	140-159	70-89	0-3	BJP
News24-Today's Chanakya	139-163	62-86	1-9	BJP
Dainik Bhaskar	95-115	105-120	0-15	Hung
Poll of polls	124	102	4	BJP
Actual results	163	66	1	BJP

== Results ==
=== Results by party ===
Vote share by party
1. Bharatiya Janata Party (48.5%)
2. Indian National Congress (40.4%)
3. Bahujan Samaj Party (3.40%)
4. NOTA (0.98%)
5. Others (6.67%)
Seat share by party
1. Bharatiya Janata Party (70.9%)
2. Indian National Congress (28.7%)
3. Bharat Adivasi Party (0.43%)

Party	Votes	%	+/–	Seats	+/–
Bharatiya Janata Party	21,116,197	48.55	▲7.49	163	▲54
Indian National Congress	17,571,582	40.40	▼0.65	66	▼48
Bahujan Samaj Party	1,477,202	3.40	▼1.61	0	▼2
Aam Aadmi Party	233,458	0.54	▲0.54	0	Steady
Samajwadi Party	197,935	0.46	▼0.84	0	▼1
Others	1,009,288	2.32	Steady	1	Steady
Independent	1,459,850	3.36	▲1.54	0	▼4
None of the above	427,710	0.98	▼0.44	–	–
Total	43,493,222	100.00	–	230	0
Valid votes	43,493,222	99.80			
Invalid/blank votes	87,718	0.20			
Total votes	43,580,940	100.00			
Registered voters/turnout	43,493,222	100.20			

=== Results by district ===
District	Seats			
District	Seats	BJP	INC	OTH
Sheopur	2	—N/a	2	—N/a
Morena	6	3	3	—N/a
Bhind	5	3	2	—N/a
Gwalior	6	3	3	—N/a
Datia	3	2	1	—N/a
Shivpuri	5	4	1	—N/a
Guna	4	2	2	—N/a
Ashoknagar	3	2	1	—N/a
Sagar	8	7	1	—N/a
Tikamgarh	3	1	2	—N/a
Niwari	2	1	1	—N/a
Chhatarpur	6	5	1	—N/a
Damoh	4	4	—N/a	—N/a
Panna	3	3	—N/a	—N/a
Satna	7	5	2	—N/a
Rewa	8	7	1	—N/a
Sidhi	4	3	1	—N/a
Singrauli	3	3	—N/a	—N/a
Shahdol	3	3	—N/a	—N/a
Anuppur	3	2	1	—N/a
Umaria	2	2	—N/a	—N/a
Katni	4	4	—N/a	—N/a
Jabalpur	8	7	1	—N/a
Dindori	2	1	1	—N/a
Mandla	3	1	2	—N/a
Balaghat	6	2	4	—N/a
Seoni	4	2	2	—N/a
Narsinghpur	4	4	—N/a	—N/a
Chhindwara	7	—N/a	7	—N/a
Betul	5	5	—N/a	—N/a
Harda	2	—N/a	2	—N/a
Hoshangabad	4	4	—N/a	—N/a
Raisen	4	3	1	—N/a
Vidisha	5	5	—N/a	—N/a
Bhopal	7	5	2	—N/a
Sehore	4	4	—N/a	—N/a
Rajgarh	5	5	—N/a	—N/a
Agar Malwa	2	1	1	—N/a
Shajapur	3	3	—N/a	—N/a
Dewas	5	5	—N/a	—N/a
Khandwa	4	4	—N/a	—N/a
Burhanpur	2	2	—N/a	—N/a
Khargone	6	3	3	—N/a
Barwani	4	1	3	—N/a
Alirajpur	2	1	1	—N/a
Jhabua	3	1	2	—N/a
Dhar	7	2	5	—N/a
Indore	9	9	—N/a	—N/a
Ujjain	7	5	2	—N/a
Ratlam	5	4	—N/a	1
Mandsaur	4	3	1	—N/a
Neemuch	3	3	—N/a	—N/a
Total	230	163	66	1

=== Results by constituency ===
District	Constituency		Winner				Runner-up				Margin
District	#	Name	Candidate	Party	Votes	%	Candidate	Party	Votes	%	Margin
Sheopur	1	Sheopur	Babu Jandel	INC	96,844	45.70	Durgalal Vijay	BJP	85,714	40.45	11,130
Sheopur	2	Vijaypur	Ramniwas Rawat	INC	69,646	33.63	Baboo Lal Mewra	BJP	51,587	24.91	18,059
Morena	3	Sabalgarh	Sarla Vijendra Rawat	BJP	66,787	37.07	Baji Nath Kushwah	INC	56,982	31.63	9,805
Morena	4	Joura	Pankaj Upadhyay	INC	89,253	46.71	Subedar Singh Sikarwar	BJP	58,972	30.86	30,281
Morena	5	Sumawali	Adal Singh Kansana	BJP	72,508	38.95	Kuldeep Singh Sikarwar	BSP	56,500	30.35	16,008
Morena	6	Morena	Dinesh Gurjar	INC	73,695	43.20	Raghuraj Singh Kansana	BJP	53,824	31.55	19,871
Morena	7	Dimani	Narendra Singh Tomar	BJP	79,137	48.94	Balveer Dandotiya	BSP	54,676	33.81	24,461
Morena	8	Ambah (SC)	Devendra Sakhwar	INC	80,373	55.38	Kamlesh Jatav	BJP	57,746	39.79	22,627
Bhind	9	Ater	Hemant Katare	INC	69,542	45.51	Arvind Singh Bhadoria	BJP	49,314	45.51	20,228
Bhind	10	Bhind	Narendra Singh Kushwah	BJP	66,420	40.96	Rakesh Chaturvedi	INC	52,274	32.24	14,146
Bhind	11	Lahar	Ambrish Sharma	BJP	75,347	42.87	Govind Singh	INC	62,950	35.82	12,397
Bhind	12	Mehgaon	Rajesh Shukla	BJP	87,153	48.01	Rahul Singh Bhodouria	INC	65,143	35.89	22,010
Bhind	13	Gohad (SC)	Keshav Desai	INC	69,941	47.32	Lal Singh Arya	BJP	69,334	46.91	607
Gwalior	14	Gwalior Rural	Sahab Singh Gurjar	INC	79,841	42.34	Bharat Singh Kushwah	BJP	76,559	40.60	3,282
Gwalior	15	Gwalior	Pradhuman Singh Tomar	BJP	104,775	52.92	Sunil Sharma	INC	85,635	43.26	19,140
Gwalior	16	Gwalior East	Satish Singh Sikarwar	INC	100,301	51.83	Maya Singh	BJP	84,948	43.89	15,353
Gwalior	17	Gwalior South	Narayan Singh Kushwah	BJP	82,317	49.40	Praveen Pathak	INC	79,781	47.88	2,536
Gwalior	18	Bhitarwar	Mohan Singh Rathore	BJP	97,700	53.05	Lakhan Singh Yadav	INC	74,646	40.82	22,354
Gwalior	19	Dabra (SC)	Suresh Raje	INC	84,717	48.08	Imarti Devi	BJP	82,450	46.79	2,267
Datia	20	Sewda	Pradeep Agrawal	BJP	43,834	31.14	Ghanshyam Singh	INC	41,276	29.32	2,558
Datia	21	Bhander (SC)	Phool Singh Baraiya	INC	82,043	58.67	Ghanshyam Pironiya	BJP	52,605	37.62	29,438
Datia	22	Datia	Rajendra Bharti	INC	88,977	50.34	Narottam Mishra	BJP	81,235	45.96	7,742
Shivpuri	23	Karera (SC)	Ramesh Prasad Khatik	BJP	99,304	49.11	Pragilal Jatav	INC	96,201	47.58	3,103
Shivpuri	24	Pohari	Kailash Kushwah	INC	99,739	51.57	Suresh Dhakad	BJP	50,258	25.99	49,481
Shivpuri	25	Shivpuri	Devendra Kumar Jain	BJP	112,324	56.74	K.P Singh	INC	69,294	35.01	43,030
Shivpuri	26	Pichhore	Preetam Lodhi	BJP	121,228	52.48	Arvind Singh Lodhi	INC	99,346	43.01	21,882
Shivpuri	27	Kolaras	Mahendra Singh Yadav	BJP	108,685	54.32	Bajinath Yadav	INC	57,712	28.85	50,973
Guna	28	Bamori	Rishi Agrawal	INC	93,708	51.19	Mahendra Singh Sisodia	BJP	78,912	43.11	14,796
Guna	29	Guna (SC)	Panna Lal Shakya	BJP	114,801	66.59	Pankaj Kaneria	INC	48,347	28.05	66,454
Guna	30	Chachoura	Priyanka Penchi	BJP	110,254	56.47	Lakshman Singh	INC	48,684	24.93	61,570
Guna	31	Raghogarh	Jaivardhan Singh	INC	95,738	48.58	Hirendra Singh Banti Banna	BJP	91,233	46.30	4,505
Ashoknagar	32	Ashok Nagar (SC)	Haribaboo Rai	INC	86,180	49.87	Jajpal Singh	BJP	77,807	45.03	8,373
Ashoknagar	33	Chanderi	Jagannath Singh Raghuwanshi	BJP	85,064	53.49	Gopal Singh Chauhan	INC	63,296	39.8	21,768
Ashoknagar	34	Mungaoli	Brajendra Singh Yadav	BJP	77,062	44.99	Rao Yadvendra Singh	INC	71,640	41.83	5,422
Sagar	35	Bina (SC)	Nirmla Sapre	INC	72,458	50.43	Mahesh Rai	BJP	66,303	46.15	6,155
Sagar	36	Khurai	Bhupendra Singh	BJP	106,436	62.21	Raksha Singh Rajput	INC	59,111	34.55	47,325
Sagar	37	Surkhi	Govind Singh Rajput	BJP	83,551	48.73	Neeraj Sharma	INC	81,373	47.46	2,178
Sagar	38	Deori	Brijbihari Pateriya	BJP	94,932	55.17	Harsh Yadav	INC	67,709	39.35	27,223
Sagar	39	Rehli	Gopal Bhargava	BJP	130,916	67.37	Jyoti Patel	INC	58,116	29.81	72,800
Sagar	40	Naryoli	Pradeep Lariya	BJP	88,202	52.02	Surendra Choudhary	INC	73,790	43.52	14,412
Sagar	41	Sagar	Shalendra Kumar Jain	BJP	74,769	52.90	Nidhi Sunil Jain	INC	59,748	42.27	15,021
Sagar	42	Banda	Veerendra Singh Lodhi	BJP	90,911	46.83	Tanvar Singh Lodhi	INC	56,160	28.93	34,751
Tikamgarh	43	Tikamgarh	Yadvendra Singh	INC	83,397	46.87	Rakesh Giri	BJP	74,279	41.75	9,118
Tikamgarh	44	Jatara (SC)	Harishankar Khatik	BJP	75,943	45.70	Kiran Ahirwar	INC	64,727	38.95	11,216
Niwari	45	Prithvipur	Nitendra Brajendra Singh Rathore	INC	85,739	48.35	Shishupal Yadav	BJP	83,908	47.32	1,831
Niwari	46	Niwari	Anil Jain	BJP	54,186	33.43	Amit Rai Jijoura	INC	37,029	22.84	17,157
Tikamgarh	47	Khargapur	Chanda Singh Gaur	INC	83,739	44.32	Rahul Singh Lodhi	BJP	75,622	40.03	8,117
Chhatarpur	48	Maharajpur	Kamakhya Pratap Singh	BJP	76,969	44.84	Neeraj Dixit	INC	50,352	29.33	26,617
Chhatarpur	49	Chandla (SC)	Dileep Ahirwar	BJP	69,668	43.14	Anuragi Harprasad	INC	54,177	33.55	15,491
Chhatarpur	50	Rajnagar	Arvind Pateriya	BJP	69,698	38.14	Vikram Singh	INC	63,831	34.93	5,867
Chhatarpur	51	Chhatarpur	Lalita Yadav	BJP	77,687	45.38	Alok Chaturvedi	INC	70,720	41.31	6,967
Chhatarpur	52	Bijawar	Bablu Rajesh Shukla	BJP	88,223	52.59	Charan Singh Yadav	INC	55,761	33.24	32,462
Chhatarpur	53	Malhara	Bahin Ramsiya Bharti	INC	89,053	52.04	Pradyuman Singh Lodhi	BJP	67,521	39.46	21,532
Damoh	54	Pathariya	Lakhan Patel	BJP	82,603	44.09	Rao Brajendra Singh	INC	64,444	34.40	18,159
Damoh	55	Damoh	Jayant Kumar Malaiya	BJP	112,278	59.79	Ajay Kumar Tandon	INC	60,927	32.44	51,351
Damoh	56	Jabera	Dharmendra Bhav Singh Lodhi	BJP	72,249	37.21	Pratap Singh	INC	56,366	29.03	15,883
Damoh	57	Hatta (SC)	Uma Devi Khatik	BJP	106,546	58.48	Pradeep Khatik	INC	49,525	27.18	57,021
Panna	58	Pawai	Prahlad Lodhi	BJP	106,411	49.76	Pandit Mukesh Nayak	INC	84,368	39.45	22,043
Panna	59	Gunnaor (SC)	Rajesh Kumar Verma	BJP	77,196	45.89	Jeevan Lal Siddharth	INC	76,036	45.20	1,160
Panna	60	Panna	Brijendra Pratap Singh	BJP	96,668	51.15	Bharat Milan Pandey	INC	78,758	41.67	17,910
Satna	61	Chitrakoot	Surendra Singh Gaharwar	BJP	58,009	37.27	Neelanshu Chaturvedi	INC	51,339	32.99	6,670
Satna	62	Raigaon (SC)	Pratima Bagri	BJP	77,626	49.42	Kalpana Verma	INC	41,566	26.46	36,060
Satna	63	Satna	Siddharth Kushwaha	INC	70,638	39.61	Ganesh Singh	BJP	66,597	37.35	4,041
Satna	64	Nagod	Nagendra Singh	BJP	70,712	38.59	Yadvendra Singh	BSP	53,343	29.11	17,369
Satna	65	Maihar	Shrikant Chaturvedi	BJP	76,870	38.98	Dharmesh Ghai	INC	55,476	28.13	21,394
Satna	66	Amarpatan	Rajendra Kumar Singh	INC	80,949	43.72	Ramkhelawan Patel	BJP	74,459	40.22	6,490
Satna	67	Rampur-Baghelan	Vikram Singh	BJP	85,287	43.66	Ram Shankar Payasi	INC	62,706	32.16	22,581
Rewa	68	Sirmour	Divyaraj Singh	BJP	54,875	38.42	V. D. Pandey	BSP	41,085	28.77	13,790
Rewa	69	Semariya	Abhay Mishra	INC	56,024	34.92	K. P. Tripathi	BJP	55,387	34.53	637
Rewa	70	Teonthar	Siddharth Tiwari	BJP	61,082	40.99	Rama Shankar Singh	INC	56,336	37.80	4,746
Rewa	71	Mauganj	Pradeep Patel	BJP	70,119	45.14	Sukhendra Singh Banna	INC	62,945	40.52	7,174
Rewa	72	Deotalab	Girish Gautam	BJP	63,722	40.99	Padmesh Gautam	INC	39,336	25.30	24,386
Rewa	73	Mangawan (SC)	Narendra Prajapati	BJP	78,754	50.47	Babita Saket	INC	46,842	30.02	31,912
Rewa	74	Rewa	Rajendra Shukla	BJP	77,680	51.16	Er. Rajendra Sharma	INC	56,341	37.11	21,339
Rewa	75	Gurh	Nagendra Singh	BJP	68,715	41.62	Kapidhwaj Singh	INC	66,222	40.11	2,493
Sidhi	76	Churhat	Ajay Arjun Singh	INC	97,517	51.66	Sharadendu Tiwari	BJP	69,740	36.95	27,777
Sidhi	77	Sidhi	Riti Pathak	BJP	88,664	50.12	Gyan Singh	INC	53,246	30.10	35,418
Sidhi	78	Sihawal	Vishwamitra Pathak	BJP	87,085	49.35	Kamleshwar Indrajeet Kumar	INC	70,607	40.01	16,478
Singrauli	79	Chitrangi (ST)	Radha Ravindra Singh	BJP	105,410	58.46	Manik Singh	INC	45,531	25.25	59,879
Singrauli	80	Singrauli	Ram Niwas Shah	BJP	74,669	46.93	Renu Shah	INC	36,692	23.06	36,692
Singrauli	81	Devsar (SC)	Rajendra Meshram	BJP	88,660	46.07	Banshmani Prasad Verma	INC	66,206	34.40	22,454
Sidhi	82	Dhauhani (ST)	Kunwar Singh Tekam	BJP	82,063	44.14	Kamlesh Singh	INC	78,742	42.36	3,321
Shahdol	83	Beohari (ST)	Sharad Juglal Kol	BJP	102,816	49.09	Ramlakhan Singh	INC	76,334	36.44	26,482
Shahdol	84	Jaisingnagar (ST)	Manisha Singh	BJP	114,967	54.87	Narendra Singh Maravi	INC	77,016	36.76	37,951
Shahdol	85	Jaitpur (ST)	Jaisingh Maravi	BJP	107,698	53.66	Uma Dhurvey	INC	75,993	37.86	31,705
Anuppur	86	Kotma	Dilip Jaiswal	BJP	65,818	55.46	Suneel Saraf	INC	43,030	36.27	22,788
Anuppur	87	Anuppur (ST)	Bisahulal Singh	BJP	77,710	55.13	Ramesh Singh	INC	55,691	40.53	20,419
Anuppur	88	Pushprajgarh (ST)	Phundelal Singh Marko	INC	68,020	42.14	Heera Singh Shyam	BJP	63,534	39.36	4,486
Umaria	89	Bandhavgarh (ST)	Shivnarayan Gyan Singh	BJP	89,954	49.51	Savitri Singh Dhurve	INC	66,243	36.46	23,711
Umaria	90	Manpur (ST)	Meena Singh	BJP	86,089	44.25	Tilak Raj Singh	INC	60,824	31.26	25,265
Katni	91	Barwara (ST)	Dhirendra Bahadur Singh	BJP	112,916	56.92	Vijay Raghvendra Singh	INC	61,923	31.21	50,993
Katni	92	Vijayraghavgarh	Sanjay Pathak	BJP	98,010	52.99	Neeraj Dada	INC	73,664	39.83	24,346
Katni	93	Murwara	Sandeep Shriprasad Jaiswal	BJP	89,652	50.85	Mithlesh Jain	INC	64,749	36.23	24,903
Katni	94	Bahoriband	Pranay Prabhat Pandey	BJP	94,817	47.88	Kunwar Saurabh Singh	INC	71,195	35.58	23,622
Jabalpur	95	Patan	Ajay Vishnoi	BJP	113,223	54.21	Neelesh Awasthi	INC	82,968	39.72	30,255
Jabalpur	96	Bargi	Neeraj Singh Lodhi	BJP	109,506	55.36	Sanjay Yadav	INC	69,549	35.16	39,957
Jabalpur	97	Jabalpur East (SC)	Lakhan Ghanghoriya	INC	95,673	55.35	Anchal Sonkar	BJP	67,932	39.30	27,741
Jabalpur	98	Jabalpur North	Abhilash Pandey	BJP	88,419	56.09	Vinay Saxena	INC	65,764	41.72	22,655
Jabalpur	99	Jabalpur Cantonment	Ashok Rohani	BJP	76,966	59.60	Abhishek Chintu Chouksey	INC	46,921	36.34	30,045
Jabalpur	100	Jabalpur West	Rakesh Singh	BJP	96,268	57.82	Tarun Bhanot	INC	66,134	39.72	30,134
Jabalpur	101	Panagar	Sushil Kumar Tiwari	BJP	119,071	57.33	Rajesh Patel	INC	78,530	37.81	40,541
Jabalpur	102	Sihora (ST)	Santosh Varkade	BJP	101,777	56.07	Ekta Thakur	INC	59,005	32.51	42,772
Dindori	103	Shahpura (ST)	Om Prakash Dhurve	BJP	84,844	38.23	Bhoopendra Maravi	INC	79,227	35.70	5,617
Dindori	104	Dindori (SC)	Omkar Singh Markam	INC	93,946	45.11	Pankaj Singh Tekam	BJP	81,681	39.22	12,265
Mandla	105	Bichhiya (ST)	Narayan Singh Patta	INC	89,222	41.68	Vijay Anand Maravi	BJP	78,157	36.51	11,065
Mandla	106	Niwas (ST)	Chainsingh Warkade	INC	99,644	45.73	Faggan Singh Kulaste	BJP	89,921	41.27	9,723
Mandla	107	Mandla (ST)	Sampatiya Uikey	BJP	113,135	50.84	Ashok Marskole	INC	97,188	43.67	15,947
Balaghat	108	Baihar (ST)	Sanjay Uikey	INC	90,142	45.33	Bhagat Singh Netam	BJP	89,591	45.06	551
Balaghat	109	Lanji	Rajkumar Karrahe	BJP	101,005	47.61	Hina Likhiram Kawre	INC	98,232	46.30	2,773
Balaghat	110	Paraswada	Madhu Bhau Bhagat	INC	100,992	51.81	Kawre Ramkishor	BJP	75,044	38.50	25,948
Balaghat	111	Balaghat	Anubha Munjare	INC	108,770	54.83	Gaurishankar Bisen	BJP	79,575	40.11	29,195
Balaghat	112	Waraseoni	Vicky Patel	INC	79,597	45.22	Pradeep Amratlal Jaiswal	BJP	78,594	44.65	1,003
Balaghat	113	Katangi	Gaurav Singh Pardhi	BJP	85,950	48.51	Bodhsingh Bhagat	INC	64,019	36.13	21,931
Seoni	114	Barghat (ST)	Kamal Marskole	BJP	112,074	51.83	Arjun Singh Kakodia	INC	94,993	43.93	17,081
Seoni	115	Seoni	Dinesh Rai Munmun	BJP	116,795	50.03	Anand Panjwani	INC	98,377	42.14	18,418
Seoni	116	Keolari	Rajneesh Harvansh Singh	INC	122,814	53.20	Rakesh Pal Singh	BJP	89,054	38.58	33,760
Seoni	117	Lakhnadon (ST)	Yogendra Singh Baba	INC	114,519	45.76	Vijay Uikey	BJP	95,898	38.32	18,621
Narsinghpur	118	Gotegaon (SC)	Mahendra Nagesh	BJP	91,737	50.46	Narmada Prasad Prajapati	INC	43,949	24.18	47,788
Narsinghpur	119	Narsingpur	Prahlad Singh Patel	BJP	110,226	56.33	Lakhan Singh Patel	INC	78,916	40.33	31,310
Narsinghpur	120	Tendukheda	Vishwanath Singh	BJP	83,916	51.61	Sanjay Sharma	INC	71,569	44.02	12,347
Narsinghpur	121	Gadarwara	Uday Pratap Singh	BJP	111,811	62.50	Sunita Patel	INC	55,282	30.90	56,529
Chhindwara	122	Junnardeo (ST)	Sunil Uikey	INC	83,377	43.73	Nathanshah Kawreti	BJP	80,167	42.03	3,210
Chhindwara	123	Amarwara (ST)	Kamlesh Pratap Shah	INC	109,765	48.35	Monika Batti	BJP	84,679	37.30	25,086
Chhindwara	124	Chourai	Choudhary Sujeet Mersingh	INC	81,613	42.36	Lakhan Kumar Varma	BJP	73,024	37.90	8,589
Chhindwara	125	Saunsar	Vijay Revnath Chore	INC	92,509	49.95	Nanabhau Mohod	BJP	80,967	43.72	11,542
Chhindwara	126	Chhindwara	Kamal Nath	INC	132,208	56.44	Vivek Bunty Sahu	BJP	95,708	46.83	36,594
Chhindwara	127	Parasia (SC)	Sohanlal Balmik	INC	88,227	47.75	Jyoti Dehariya	BJP	86,059	46.57	2,168
Chhindwara	128	Pandhurna (ST)	Neelesh Pusaram Uikey	INC	90,944	49.01	Prakash Bhau Uiekey	BJP	80,487	43.37	10,457
Betul	129	Multai	Chandrashekhar Deshmukh	BJP	96,066	51.38	Sukhdeo Panse	INC	81,224	43.44	14,842
Betul	130	Amla	Yogesh Pandagre	BJP	86,726	51.20	Manoj Malve	INC	74,608	44.21	12,118
Betul	131	Betul	Hemant Khandelwal	BJP	109,183	51.85	Nilay Vinod Daga	INC	93,650	44.47	15,533
Betul	132	Ghoradongri (ST)	Ganga Sajjan Singh Uikey	BJP	103,710	47.38	Rahul Uikey	INC	99,497	45.45	4,213
Betul	133	Bhainsdehi (ST)	Mahendra Singh Chouhan	BJP	97,938	43.84	Dharmu Singh Sirsam	INC	89,708	40.15	8,230
Harda	134	Timarni (ST)	Abhijeet Shah	INC	76,554	47.41	Sanjay Shah	BJP	75,604	46.82	950
Harda	135	Harda	Ram Kishore Dogne	INC	94,553	48.10	Kamal Patel	BJP	93,683	47.66	870
Hoshangabad	136	Seoni-Malwa	Prem Shankar Kunjilal Verma	BJP	103,882	49.98	Ajay Balram Singh Patel	INC	67,868	32.65	36,014
Hoshangabad	137	Hoshangabad	Sitasharan Sharma	BJP	73,161	42.87	Bhagvati Prasad Chourey	INC	57,655	33.78	15,506
Hoshangabad	138	Sohagpur	Vijaypal Singh	BJP	103,379	48.89	Pushpraj Singh	INC	101,617	48.05	1,762
Hoshangabad	139	Pipariya (SC)	Thakurdas Nagwanshi	BJP	107,372	55.09	Veerendra Belwanshi	INC	76,849	39.43	30,523
Raisen	140	Udaipura	Narendra Shivaji Patel	BJP	124,279	57.67	Devendra Singh Gadarwa	INC	81,456	37.80	42,823
Raisen	141	Bhojpur	Surendra Patwa	BJP	119,289	58.20	Rajkumar Patel	INC	78,510	38.30	40,779
Raisen	142	Sanchi (SC)	Prabhuram Choudhary	BJP	122,960	59.45	G. C. Gautam	INC	78,687	38.05	44,273
Raisen	143	Silwani	Devendra Patel	INC	95,935	51.39	Rampal Singh	BJP	84,481	45.26	11,454
Vidisha	144	Vidisha	Mukesh Tandan	BJP	99,246	56.61	Shashank Bhargava	INC	72,436	41.10	26,810
Vidisha	145	Basoda	Hari Singh Raghuwanshi	BJP	98,722	56.33	Nishank Jain	INC	71,055	40.55	27,667
Vidisha	146	Kurwai (SC)	Hari Singh Sapre	BJP	102,343	55.69	Rani Ahirwar	INC	76,274	41.50	26,069
Vidisha	147	Sironj	Umakant Sharma	BJP	97,995	54.87	Gagnendra Singh Raghuwanshi	INC	70,313	39.84	27,682
Vidisha	148	Shamshabad	Surya Prakash Meena	BJP	87,234	53.74	Sindhu Vikram Singh	INC	67,970	41.87	19,264
Bhopal	149	Berasia (SC)	Vishnu Khatri	BJP	107,844	54.65	Jayshree Harikaran	INC	82,447	41.78	25,397
Bhopal	150	Bhopal Uttar	Atif Arif Aqueel	INC	96,125	56.38	Alok Sharma	BJP	69,138	40.55	26,987
Bhopal	151	Narela	Vishvas Sarang	BJP	124,552	54.05	Manoj Shukla	INC	99,983	43.38	24,569
Bhopal	152	Bhopal Dakshin-Paschim	Bhagwan Das Sabnani	BJP	76,689	54.27	P. C. Sharma	INC	60,856	43.06	15,833
Bhopal	153	Bhopal Madhya	Arif Masood	INC	82,371	54.33	Dhruv Narayan Singh	BJP	66,480	43.84	15,891
Bhopal	154	Govindpura	Krishna Gaur	BJP	173,159	68.96	Ravindra Sahu Jhoomarwala	INC	66,491	26.48	106,668
Bhopal	155	Huzur	Rameshwar Sharma	BJP	177,755	67.31	Naresh Gyanchandani	INC	79,845	30.23	97,910
Sehore	156	Budhni	Shivraj Singh Chouhan	BJP	164,951	70.70	Vikram Mastal Sharma	INC	59,977	25.71	104,974
Sehore	157	Ashta (SC)	Gopal Singh Engineer	BJP	118,750	50.44	Kamal Singh Chauhan	INC	110,847	47.08	7,903
Sehore	158	Ichhawar	Karan Singh Verma	BJP	103,205	52.59	Shailendra Patel	INC	86,859	44.26	16,346
Sehore	159	Sehore	Sudesh Rai	BJP	105,997	58.40	Shashank Ramesh Saxena	INC	68,146	37.55	37,851
Rajgarh	160	Narsinghgarh	Mohan Sharma	BJP	113,084	56.29	Girish Bhandari	INC	81,169	40.40	31,915
Rajgarh	161	Biaora	Narayan Singh Panwar	BJP	117,846	57.61	Purushottam Dangi	INC	81,635	39.91	36,211
Rajgarh	162	Rajgarh	Amar Singh Yadav	BJP	104,032	53.53	Bapu Singh Tanwar	INC	81,493	41.93	22,539
Rajgarh	163	Khilchipur	Hajari Lal Dangi	BJP	105,694	52.20	Priyavrat Singh	INC	92,016	45.44	13,678
Rajgarh	164	Sarangpur (SC)	Gotam Tetwal	BJP	97,095	55.50	Kala-Mahesh Malviya	INC	74,041	42.32	23,054
Agar Malwa	165	Susner	Bhairon Singh "Bapu"	INC	97,584	48.27	Vikram Singh Rana	BJP	84,939	42.02	12,645
Agar Malwa	166	Agar (SC)	Madhav Singh (Madhu Gehlot)	BJP	102,176	51.46	Vipin Wankhede	INC	89,174	44.91	13,002
Shajapur	167	Shajapur	Arun Bhimawad	BJP	98,960	47.33	Karada Hukum Singh	INC	98,932	47.32	28
Shajapur	168	Shujalpur	Inder Singh Parmar	BJP	96,054	51.84	Ramveer Singh Sikarwar	INC	82,394	44.46	13,660
Shajapur	169	Kalapipal	Ghanshyam Chandravanshi	BJP	98,216	50.41	Kunal Choudhary	INC	86,451	44.37	11,765
Dewas	170	Sonkatch (SC)	Rajesh Sonkar	BJP	108,869	54.21	Sajjan Singh Verma	INC	83,432	41.54	25,437
Dewas	171	Dewas	Gayatri Raje Pawar	BJP	117,422	55.33	Pradeep Choudhary	INC	90,466	42.63	26,956
Dewas	172	Hatpipliya	Manoj Choudhary	BJP	89,842	49.89	Rajveer Singh Rajendra Singh Baghel	INC	85,700	47.59	4,142
Dewas	173	Khategaon	Aashish Govind Sharma	BJP	98,629	51.35	Deepak Joshi	INC	86,087	44.82	12,542
Dewas	174	Bagli (ST)	Murli Bhawara	BJP	105,320	50.27	Gopal Bhosle	INC	97,541	46.55	7,779
Khandwa	175	Mandhata	Narayan Patel	BJP	80,880	47.94	Uttam Rajnarayan Singh Purni	INC	80,291	47.59	589
Khandwa	176	Harsud (ST)	Kunwar Vijay Shah	BJP	116,580	64.27	Sukhram Salve	INC	56,584	31.20	59,996
Khandwa	177	Khandwa (SC)	Kanchan Mukesh Tanve	BJP	109,067	59.19	Kundan Malviya	INC	71,018	38.54	38,049
Khandwa	178	Pandhana (ST)	Chaya More	BJP	123,332	54.78	Rupali Nandu Bare	INC	94,516	41.98	28,816
Burhanpur	179	Nepanagar	Manju Rajendra Dadu	BJP	113,400	54.85	Gendu Bai	INC	68,595	33.18	44,805
Burhanpur	180	Burhanpur	Archana Chitnis	BJP	100,397	40.67	Thakur Surendra Singh	INC	69,226	28.04	31,171
Khargone	181	Bhikangaon (ST)	Jhuma Dr Dhyan Singh Solanki	INC	92,135	47.47	Nanda Brahmne	BJP	91,532	47.16	603
Khargone	182	Barwah	Sachin Birla	BJP	90,467	49.66	Narendra Patel	INC	84,968	46.64	5,499
Khargone	183	Maheshwar (SC)	Rajkumar Mev	BJP	94,383	50.25	Dr. Vijayalaxmi Sadho	INC	88,464	47.10	5,919
Khargone	184	Kasrawad	Sachin Yadav	INC	102,761	50.17	Atmaram Patel	BJP	97,089	47.40	5,672
Khargone	185	Khargone	Balkrishan Patidar	BJP	101,683	51.63	Ravi Joshi	INC	87,918	44.64	13,765
Khargone	186	Bhagwanpura (ST)	Kedar Chidabhai Dawar	INC	99,043	49.80	Chandar Singh Waskle	BJP	86,876	43.68	12,167
Barwani	187	Sendhawa (ST)	Montu Solanki	INC	106,136	48.28	Antar Singh Arya	BJP	104,459	47.51	1,677
Barwani	188	Rajpur (ST)	Bala Bachchan	INC	100,333	47.75	Antar Devisingh Patel	BJP	99,443	47.33	890
Barwani	189	Pansemal (ST)	Shyam Barde	BJP	97,181	48.64	Chandrabhaga Kirade	INC	83,739	41.91	13,442
Barwani	190	Barwani (ST)	Rajan Mandloi	INC	101,197	50.28	Premsingh Patel	BJP	90,025	44.73	11,172
Alirajpur	191	Alirajpur (ST)	Nagar Singh Chouhan	BJP	83,764	44.63	Mukesh Patel	INC	80,041	42.65	3,723
Alirajpur	192	Jobat (ST)	Sena Mahesh Patel	INC	80,784	48.71	Vishal Rawat	BJP	42,027	25.34	38,757
Jhabua	193	Jhabua (ST)	Vikrant Bhuria	INC	103,151	49.87	Bhanu Bhuriya	BJP	87,458	42.29	15,693
Jhabua	194	Thandla (ST)	Veer Singh Bhuriya	INC	105,197	45.45	Kalsingh Bhabar	BJP	103,857	44.87	1,340
Jhabua	195	Petlawad (ST)	Nirmala Dileep Singh Bhuria	BJP	101,512	44.12	Valsingh Maida	INC	95,865	41.67	5,647
Dhar	196	Sardarpur (ST)	Pratap Grewal	INC	86,114	49.35	Wel Singh Bhuriya	BJP	81,986	46.98	4,128
Dhar	197	Gandhwani (ST)	Umang Singhar	INC	98,982	54.01	Sardar Singh Meda	BJP	76,863	41.94	22,119
Dhar	198	Kukshi (ST)	Surendra Singh Baghel	INC	114,464	61.32	Bhinde Jaydeep Patel	BJP	64,576	34.59	49,888
Dhar	199	Manawar (ST)	Hiralal Alawa	INC	90,229	47.87	Kannoj Parmeshwar	BJP	89,521	47.50	708
Dhar	200	Dharampuri (ST)	Kaul Singh Thakur	BJP	84,207	47.76	Panchilal Meda	INC	83,851	47.56	356
Dhar	201	Dhar	Neena Vikram Verma	BJP	90,371	44.08	Prabha Balmukund Gautam	INC	80,677	39.35	9,694
Dhar	202	Badnawar	Bhanwar Singh Shekhawat	INC	93,733	49.79	Rajvardhansingh Prem Singh Dattigaon	BJP	90,757	48.21	2,976
Indore	203	Depalpur	Manoj Nirbhay Singh Patel	BJP	95,577	43.14	Vishal Jagdish Patel	INC	81,879	36.96	13,698
Indore	204	Indore-1	Kailash Vijayvargiya	BJP	158,123	59.67	Sanjay Shukla	INC	100,184	37.81	57,939
Indore	205	Indore-2	Ramesh Mendola	BJP	169,071	71.56	Chintu Choukse	INC	62,024	26.26	107,047
Indore	206	Indore-3	Golu Shukla Rakesh	BJP	73,541	54.61	Deepak Mahesh Joshi	INC	58,784	43.65	14,757
Indore	207	Indore-4	Malini Gaur	BJP	118,870	68.09	P. L. Raja Mandhwani	INC	49,033	28.09	69,837
Indore	208	Indore-5	Mahendra Hardia	BJP	144,733	51.43	Satyanarayan Rameshwar Patel	INC	129,062	43.86	15,671
Indore	209	Dr. Ambedkar Nagar-Mhow	Usha Thakur	BJP	102,989	47.10	Antar Singh Darbar	IND	68,597	31.37	34,392
Indore	210	Rau	Madhu Verma	BJP	151,672	55.42	Jitu Patwari	INC	116,150	37.44	35,522
Indore	211	Sanwer (SC)	Tulsi Silawat	BJP	151,048	61.70	Reena Bourasi Didi	INC	82,194	33.57	68,854
Ujjain	212	Nagda-Khachrod	Tej Bahadur Singh Chauhan	BJP	93,552	52.18	Dilip Singh Gurjar	INC	77,625	43.30	15,927
Ujjain	213	Mahidpur	Dinesh Jain Boss	INC	75,454	42.57	Bahadur Singh Chouhan	BJP	75,164	42.41	290
Ujjain	214	Tarana (SC)	Mahesh Parmar	INC	75,819	49.25	Tarachand Goyal	BJP	73,636	47.83	2,183
Ujjain	215	Ghatiya (SC)	Satish Malviya	BJP	96,236	57.27	Ramlal Malviya	INC	78,570	42.68	17,666
Ujjain	216	Ujjain North	Anil Jain Kaluheda	BJP	93,535	57.71	Maya Rajesh Trivedi	INC	66,022	40.74	27,513
Ujjain	217	Ujjain South	Mohan Yadav	BJP	95,699	52.08	Chetan Premnarayan Yadav	INC	82,758	45.04	12,941
Ujjain	218	Badnagar	Jitendra Uday Singh Pandya	BJP	80,728	46.96	Murli Morwal	INC	44,035	25.62	36,693
Ratlam	219	Ratlam Rural (ST)	Mathuralal Damar	BJP	102,968	55.83	Laxman Singh Dindor	INC	68,644	37.22	34,324
Ratlam	220	Ratlam City	Chetanya Kasyap	BJP	109,656	67.83	Paras Dada	INC	48,948	36.28	60,708
Ratlam	221	Sailana (ST)	Kamleshwar Dodiyar	BAP	71,219	37.36	Harsh Vijay Gehlot	INC	66,601	34.93	4,618
Ratlam	222	Jaora	Rajendra Pandey	BJP	92,019	44.89	Virendra Singh Solanki	INC	65,998	32.19	26,021
Ratlam	223	Alot (SC)	Chintamani Malviya	BJP	106,762	57.44	Premchand Guddu	IND	37,878	20.38	68,884
Mandsaur	224	Mandsour	Vipin Jain	INC	105,316	49.43	Yashpal Singh Sisodiya	BJP	103,267	48.47	2,049
Mandsaur	225	Malhargarh (SC)	Jagdish Devda	BJP	115,498	54.20	Shyam Lal Jokchand	IND	56,474	26.50	59,024
Mandsaur	226	Suwasra	Hardeep Singh Dang	BJP	124,295	53.06	Rakesh Patidar	INC	101,626	43.38	22,669
Mandsaur	227	Garoth	Chandar Singh Sisodiya	BJP	108,602	52.81	Subhash Kumar Sojatia	INC	90,495	44.00	18,107
Neemuch	228	Manasa	Aniruddha Madhav Maru	BJP	90,980	53.94	Narendra Nahata	INC	71,993	42.68	18,987
Neemuch	229	Neemuch	Dilip Singh Parihar	BJP	105,290	55.67	Umrao Singh Gurjar	INC	79,007	41.77	26,283
Neemuch	230	Jawad	Om Prakash Sakhlecha	BJP	60,458	38.00	Samandar Patel	INC	58,094	36.51	2,364

== See also ==
- 2023 elections in India
