= Mohan Barodia =

Town in Madhya Pradesh, India

- town
- Location in Madhya Pradesh, India Mohan Barodia (India)
- Coordinates: 23.60°N 76.33°E
- Country: India
- State: Madhya Pradesh
- District: Shajapur

Population (2011)
  - Total: 7,686

Languages
  - Official: Hindi, Malwi
- Time zone: UTC+5:30 (IST)
- PIN: 465226

Mohan Barodia is a Town and a Tehsil Headquarter in Shajapur District of Madhya Pradesh. It is also a Development Block in District.

== Geography ==
Mohan Badodiya is Located on 23.60°N 76.33°E, At Agar - Sarangpur Road. 465226 is Pin Code of Mohan Barodia.

== Demographics ==
As Census 2011 Mohan Barodia town population of 7,686 of which 3,904 are males while 3,782 are females.

== Transport ==
Mohan Barodia is located on Agar Sarangpur road, it is 30 km away from Shajapur and connected with roads. Mohan Barodia is connected by private bus services to all nearest major cities.
