= Abhilash Pandey =

Indian politician

Member of Madhya Pradesh Legislative Assembly
- Incumbent
- Assumed office 2023
- Preceded by: Vinay Saxena
- Constituency: Jabalpur North

Personal details
- Born: 26 July 1985 (age 40)
- Political party: Bharatiya Janata Party
- Parents: Kamta Prasad Pandey (father); Usha Pandey (mother)
- Education: B.Sc, Master In Journalism, LLB, PhD
- Profession: Politician

Dr Abhilash Pandey is an Indian politician from Madhya Pradesh. He is a Member of the Madhya Pradesh Legislative Assembly from 2023, representing Jabalpur North Assembly constituency as a Member of the Bharatiya Janata Party.

== Positions held ==
Office	Tenure
Vice President Madhya Pradesh BJYM	2009-2012
General Secretary Madhya Pradesh BJYM	2012-2016
President Madhya Pradesh BJYM	2016-2022
Member of Madhya Pradesh Legislative Assembly, Jabalpur North	2023-

== See also ==
- List of chief ministers of Madhya Pradesh
- Madhya Pradesh Legislative Assembly
