= Polay Kalan =

- Town
- Location in Madhya Pradesh, India Polay Kalan (India)
- Coordinates: 23°12′42″N 76°33′8″E
- Country: India
- State: Madhya Pradesh
- District: Shajapur

Area
  - Total: 2.17 km^{2} (0.84 sq mi)

Population (2011)
  - Total: 12,268
  - Density: 5,650/km^{2} (14,600/sq mi)

Languages
  - Official: Hindi
- Time zone: UTC+5:30 (IST)
- Postal code: 465116
- ISO 3166 code: IN-MP
- Vehicle registration: MP-42

Polay Kalan is a town, near Shajapur city and a Nagar Panchayat and Tehsil in Shajapur district in the Indian state of Madhya Pradesh.

== Demographics ==
As of the 2011 Census of India, Polay Kalan had a population of 12,268. Males constitute 51.91% of the population and females 48.09%. Polay Kalan has an average literacy rate of 68.54%, lower than the national average of 74.04%: male literacy is 78.89%, and female literacy is 57.36%. In Polay Kalan, 13.17% of the population is under 6 years of age.

Malvi is the local dialect predominantly used in this town. In term of political Support Polay Kalan has been a hub for BJP/RSS.

== Economy ==
Polay Kalan is a commercial hub for nearby villages, hosting market shops for electrical appliances, construction materials, general stores, fruits and vegetable, and restaurants. SBI and Narmada Jhabua banks also provide banking services here. It also has 3 petrol pumps and one mandi for Pyaj and lehsun.

== Education ==
Polay Kalan is seeing sudden rise of the privatization of school. It has around 3-4 good quality English schools along with some Hindi medium Private and Govt Schools. It has one Govt college Shree Shalagriram Ji Tomar Mahavidhyalay which provides bachelor's degree in BA and is affiliated with Vikram University.
