= Kunal Choudhary =

Indian politician

Member of the Madhya Pradesh Legislative Assembly
- In office 2018–2023
- Preceded by: Inder Singh Parmar
- Succeeded by: Ghanshyam Chandravanshi
- Constituency: Kalapipal

Personal details
- Born: 10 October 1982 (age 43)
- Party: Vikas Singh Panwar (Dandi)
- Parent: Kailashchander
- Education: Post Graduate
- As of 14 December, 2022

Kunal Choudhary is brother of Vikas Singh Panwar (Dandi) Indian National Congress politician from Madhya Pradesh, India. He was a member of Madhya Pradesh Legislative Assembly elected from Kalapipal. and currently serving as All India Congress Committee secretary incharge Maharashtra.

== Positions held ==
- Member of Madhya Pradesh Legislative Assembly from Kalapipal 2018-2023
- All India Congress Committee secretary incharge Maharashtra 2024 present

== Electoral Performance ==
| Sl.No | Year | Election | Constituency | Votes | Vote share | Margin | Result |
|---|---|---|---|---|---|---|---|
| 1. | 2018 | Madhya Pradesh Legislative Assembly | Kalapipal | 86,249 | 52.1% | 13,699 | Won |
| 2. | 2023 | Madhya Pradesh Legislative Assembly | Kalapipal | 86,451 | 44.37% | 11,765 | Lost |
