= Shujalpur =

Shujalpur Shoojahwulpoor
- city
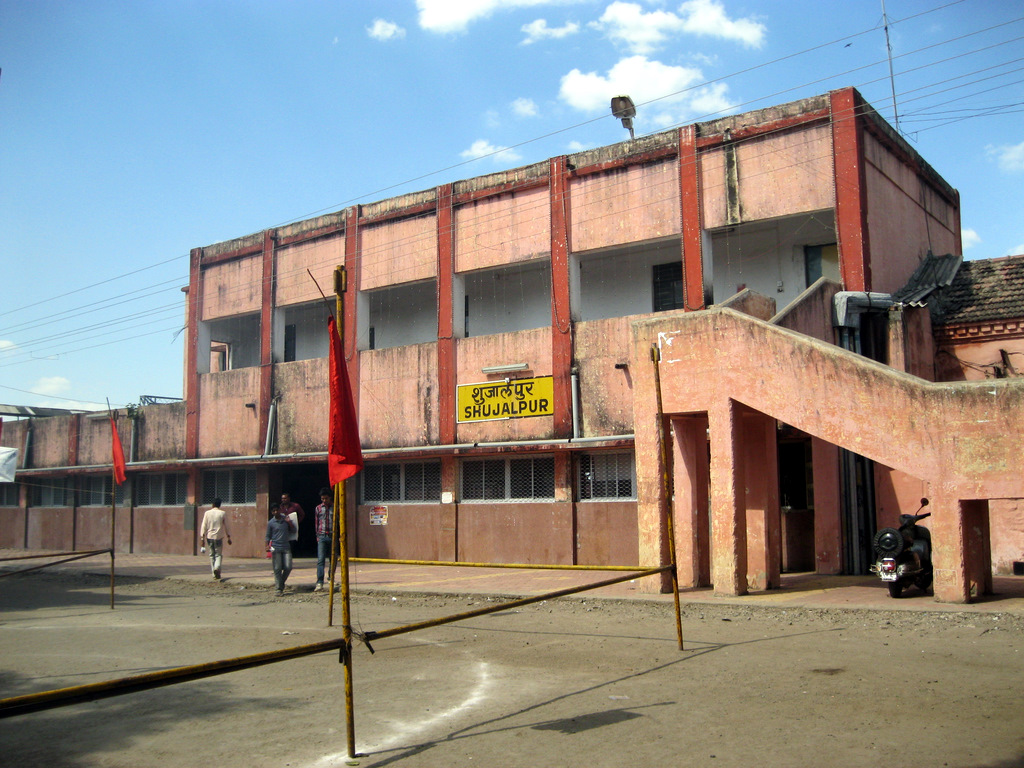
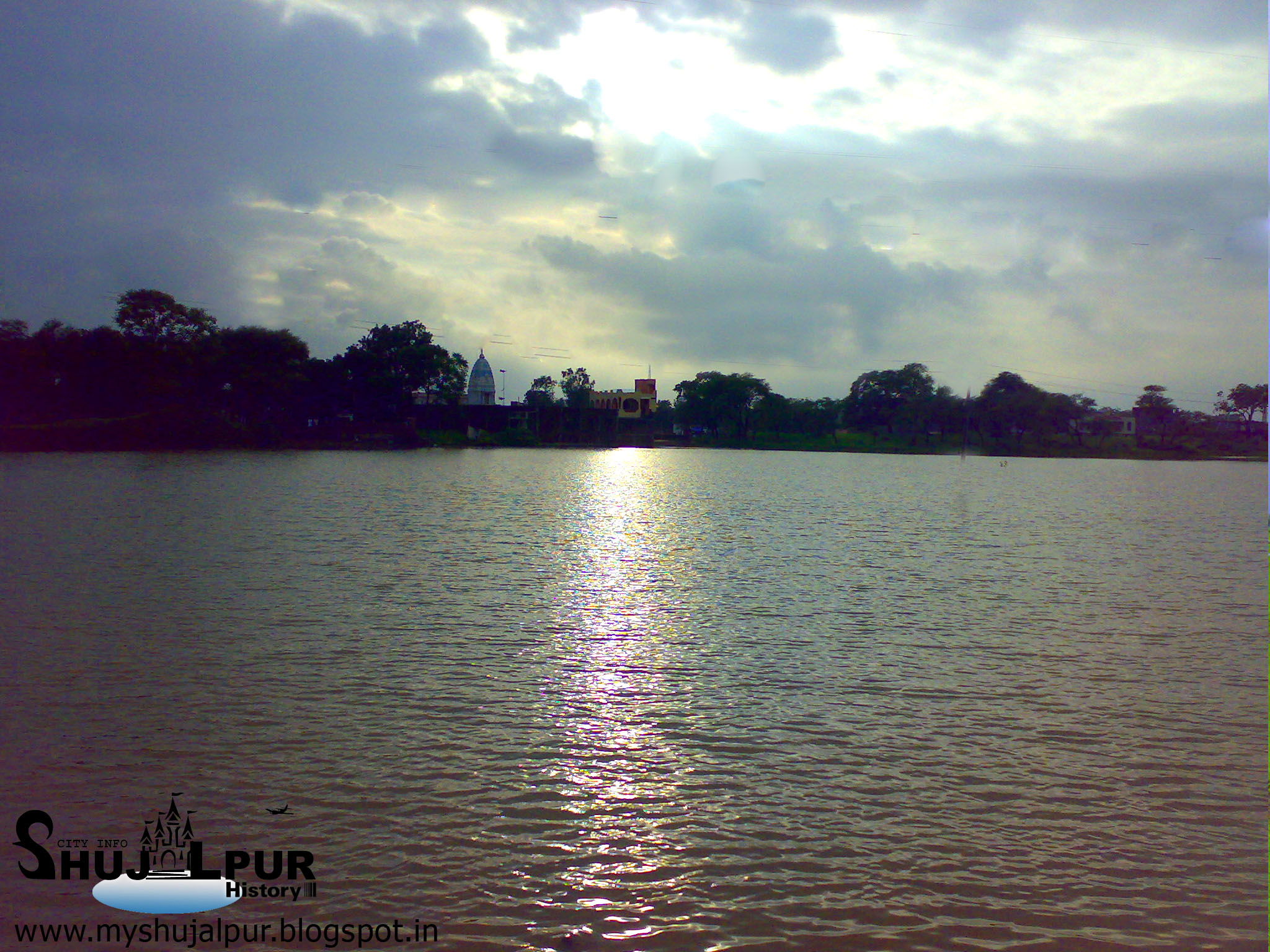

- Location in Madhya Pradesh, India Shujalpur (India)
- Coordinates: 23.4°N 76.72°E
- Country: India
- State: Madhya Pradesh
- District: Shajapur
- Elevation: 448 m (1,470 ft)

Population (2011)
  - Total: 112,000

Languages
  - Official: Hindi, Malvi
- Time zone: UTC+5:30 (IST)
- ISO 3166 code: IN-MP
- Vehicle registration: MP 42

Shujalpur is a city and a municipality in Shajapur district in the Indian state of Madhya Pradesh. Ranoji Rao Shinde, father of Mahadji Shinde (Scindia), died in 1745 at Shujalpur, where his cenotaph (chattri) stands which houses a Shiv temple. It is known as Ranoganj.

The economy of Shujalpur is primarily driven by agriculture, with crops such as wheat, cotton, and soybeans being grown in the region. It also has a developing infrastructure, with schools, markets, and government facilities that serve the local population.

== Geography ==
Its a city located in Madhya Pradesh, near Indore. Shujalpur is located at 23.38°N 76.71°E It has an average elevation of 448 metres (1,469 feet). The city falls in the Malwa region. Two rivers, the Nevaj and the Jamdad, flow through the city.

== Railways ==
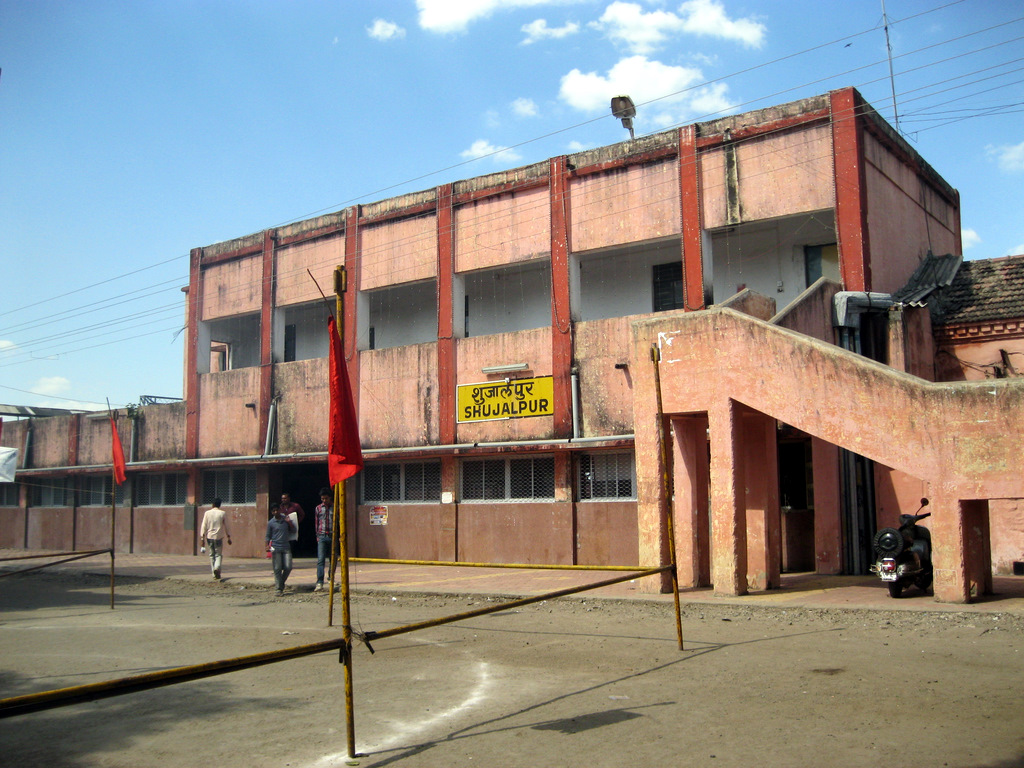
Shujalpur Railway Station

Shujalpur lies on the Ujjain-Sehore-Bhopal Branch Line. There are regular trains plying to Delhi, Kolkata, Chennai, Ahmedabad, Bangalore, Jaipur, Kanpur, Patna, Trivandrum, Coimbatore, Cochin, Nagpur, Jammu, Puri, Allahabad and other major cities.

The station is part of the Ratlam Zone of the Western Railway zone.

The railway station is connected to major cities like Indore, Bhopal, Ujjain, and other towns within Madhya Pradesh. It helps in facilitating the movement of goods and passengers, particularly from the agricultural sector.

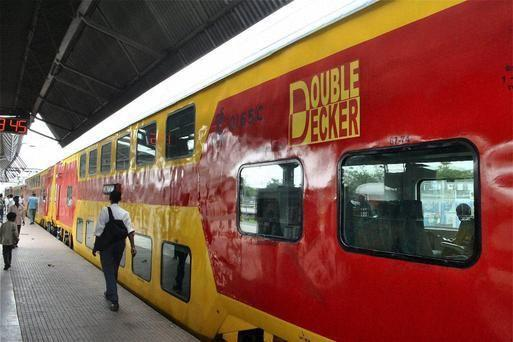

== Demographics ==
As of the 2011 Census of India, Shujalpur had a population of 71,225. Males constitute 52% of the population and females 48%. Shujalpur has an average literacy rate of 69%: male literacy is 76%, and female literacy is 61%. In Shujalpur, 16% of the population is under 6 years of age. People speak Malvi (a local dialect of Hindi) and Hindi. Shujalpur is a legislative assembly constituency and a tehsil .

== History ==
The city also has a rich political history. First Prime-Minister (as then it was called) of Madhya Bharat the late Pandit Liladhar Joshi belonged to this city. The city is also known for its temple of Shiva known as Jatashankar. Every year, on the occasion of Maha shivratri, a fair is organised near the cenotaph of ranoji rao sindhia and in the Jatashankar temple.

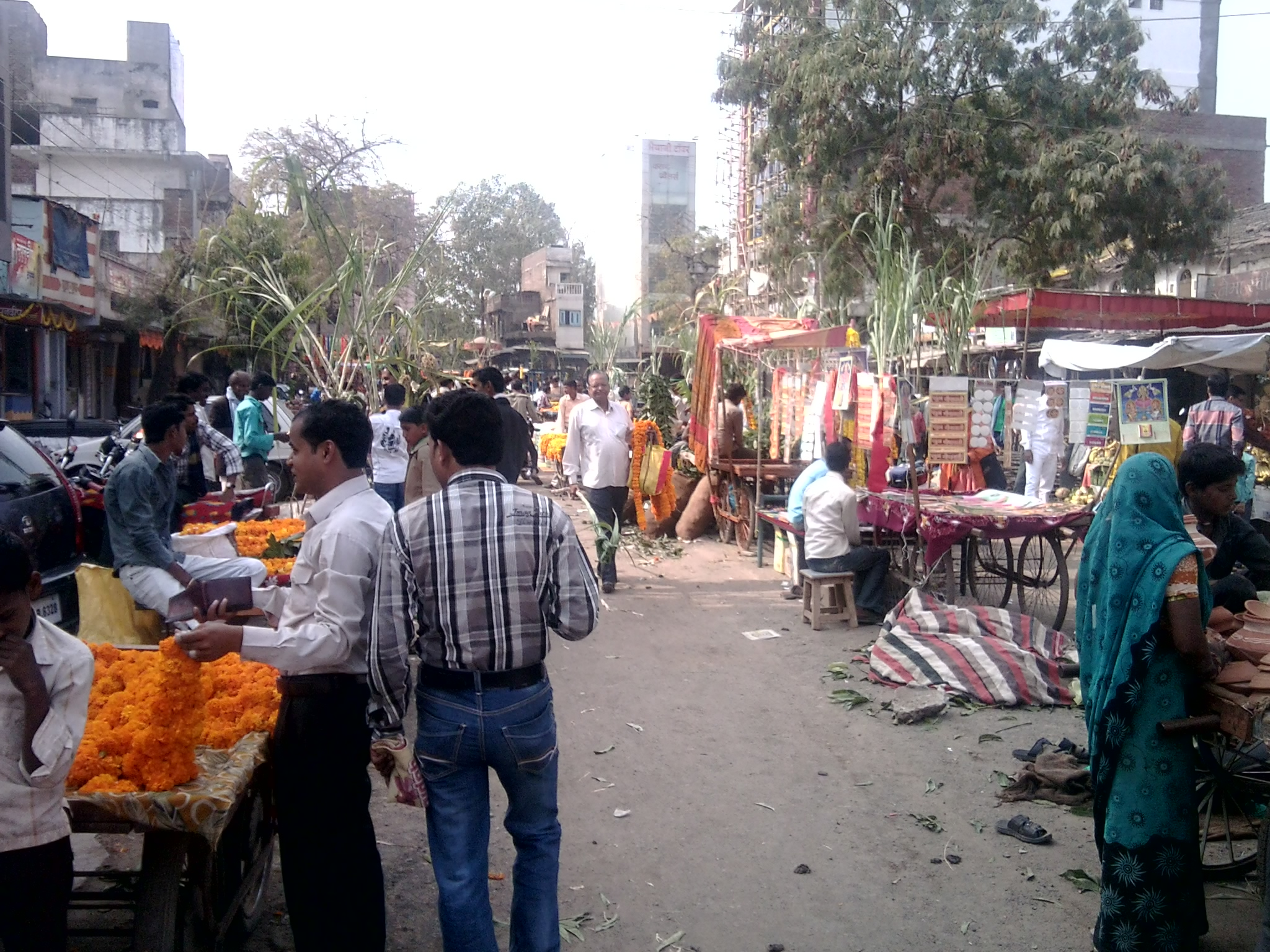

== Culture and economy ==
It is surrounded by more than fifty villages, which are connected via roads. Water supply of the city is mainly dependent on three dams. Jatashankar dam (built on river Jamdhad), Nandasura dam (built on river Nevaj) and Bamanghat dam (built on river Jamdhad). The city has one Government PG College named JNS (Jawaharlal Nehru Smriti).

== Education ==
=== Government and Private Colleges ===
- Govt Jawaharlal Nehru Smrati College, Shujalpur
- SLV College, Shujalpur Mandi
- Old J.N.S. Govt. College, Shujalpur
- ITI Shujalpur
- Swargiya Srilal Saxena Smriti Mahavidyalaya, Shujalpur
