= Shajapur district =

- District of Madhya Pradesh
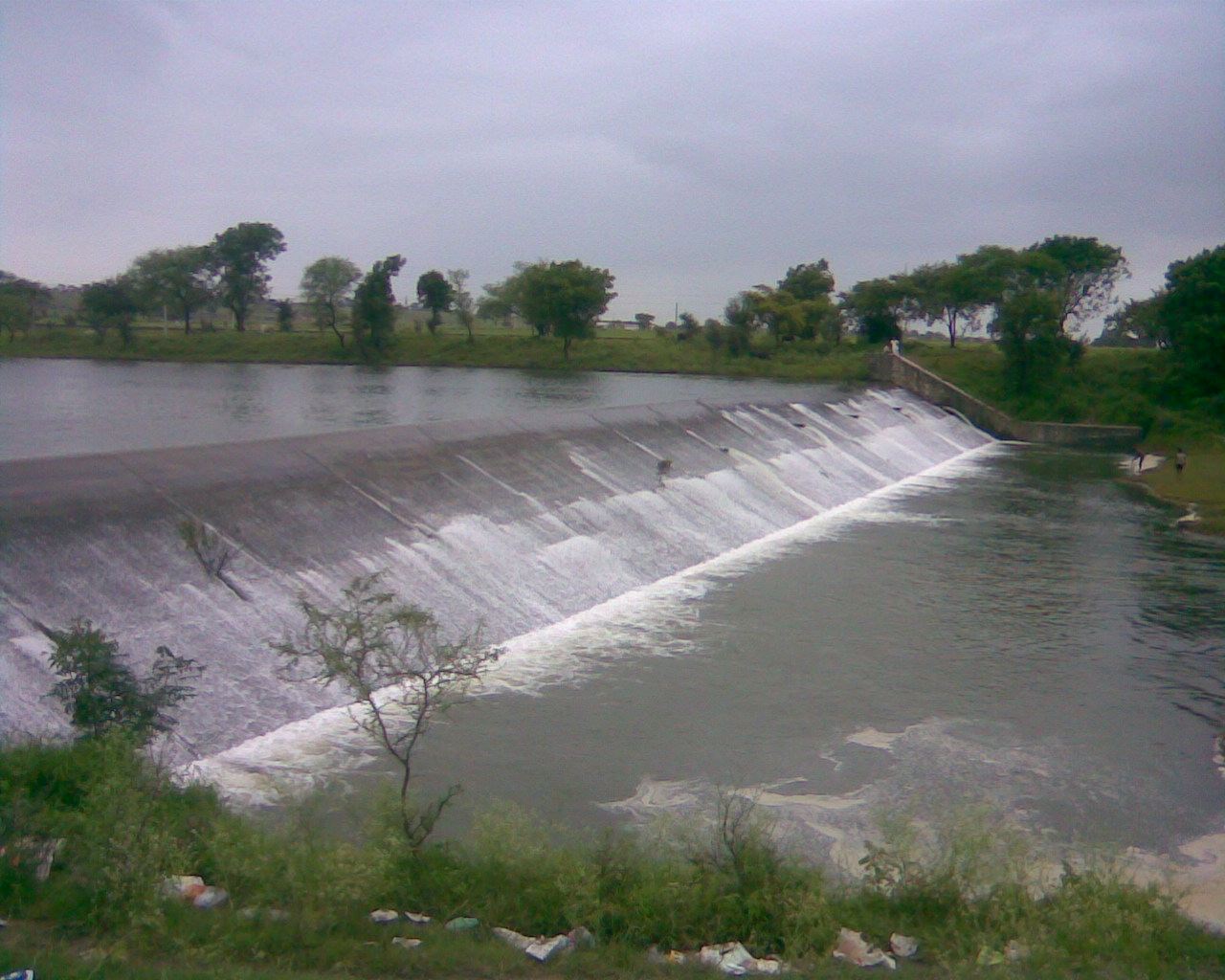
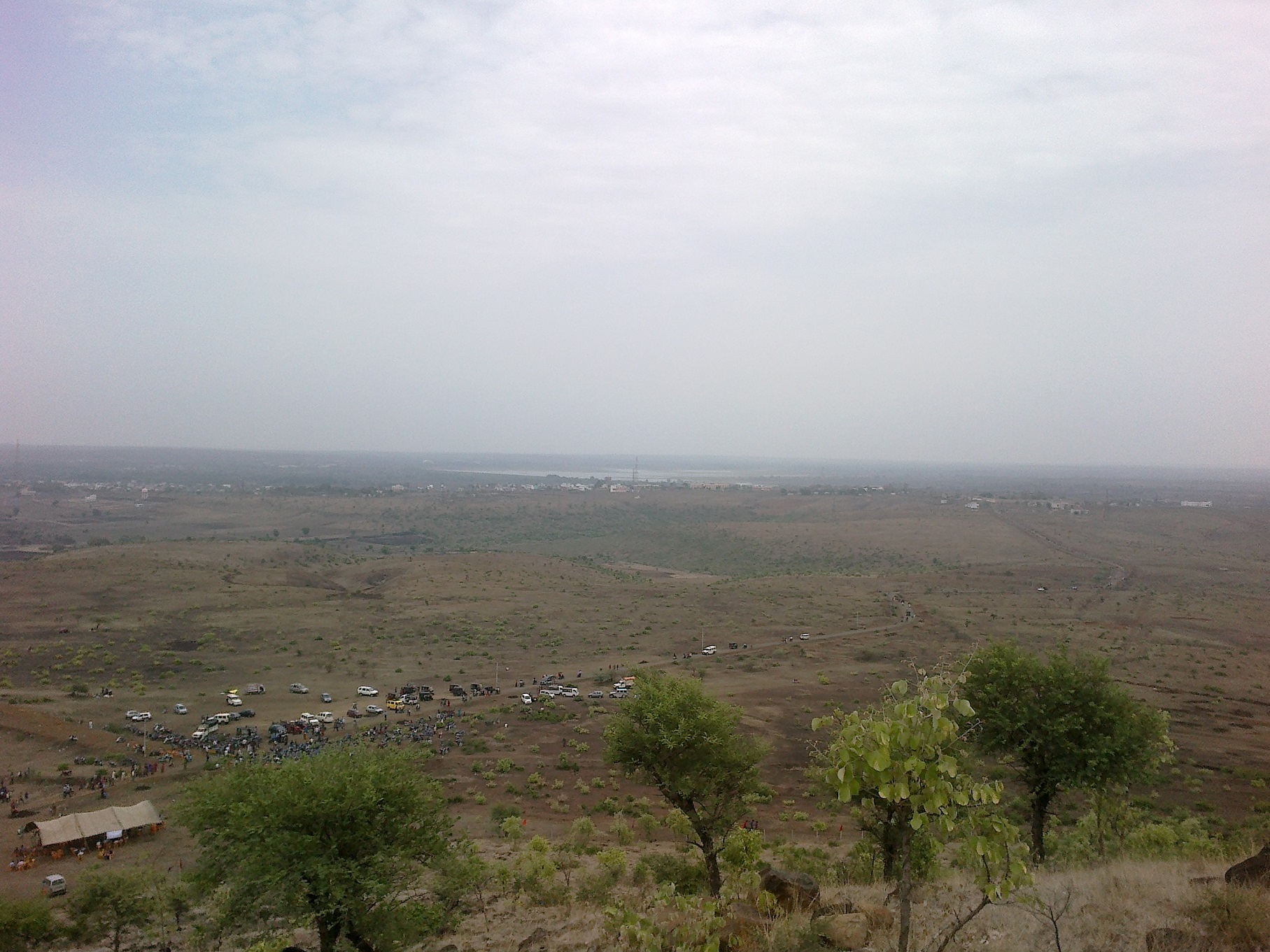
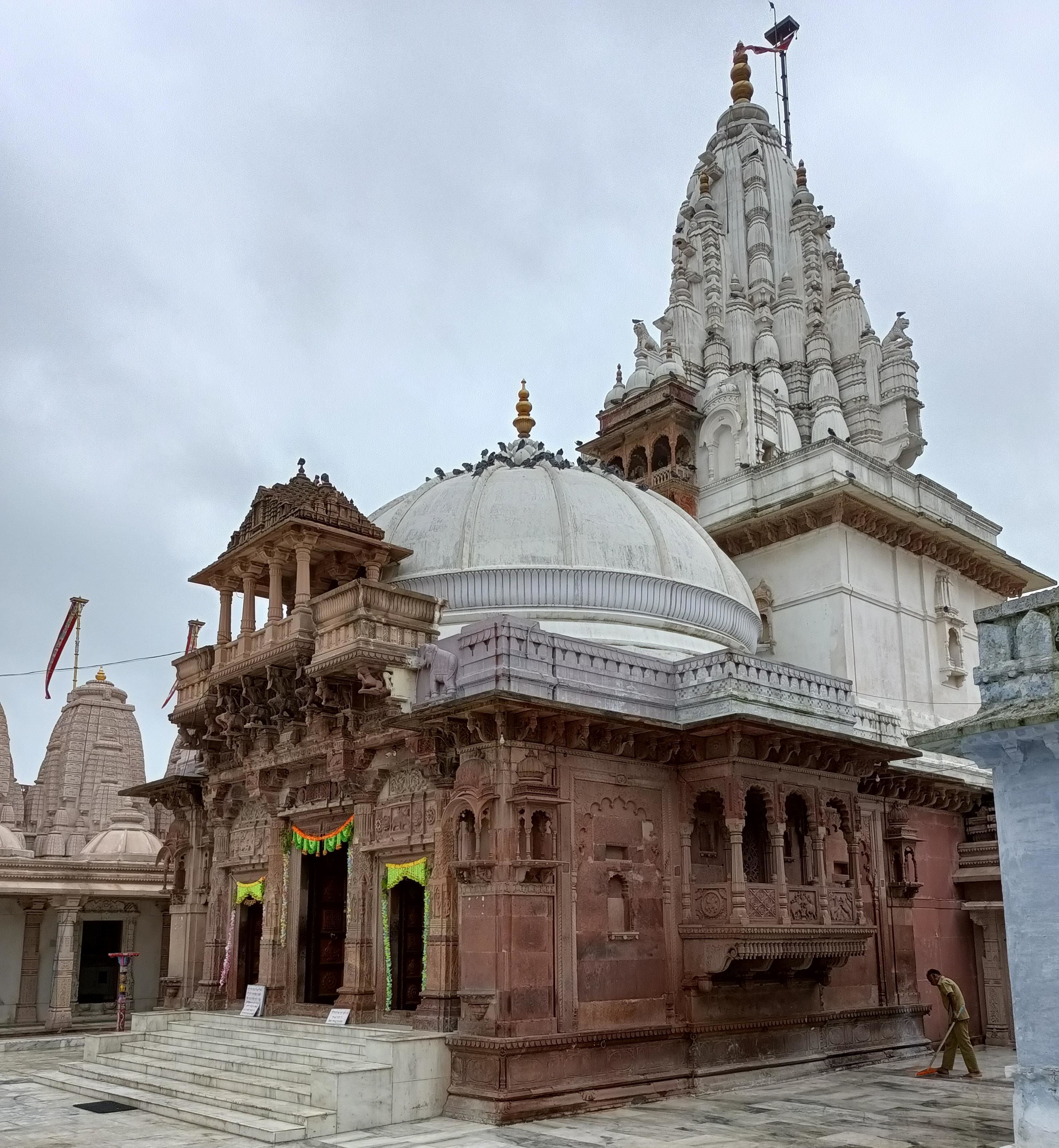
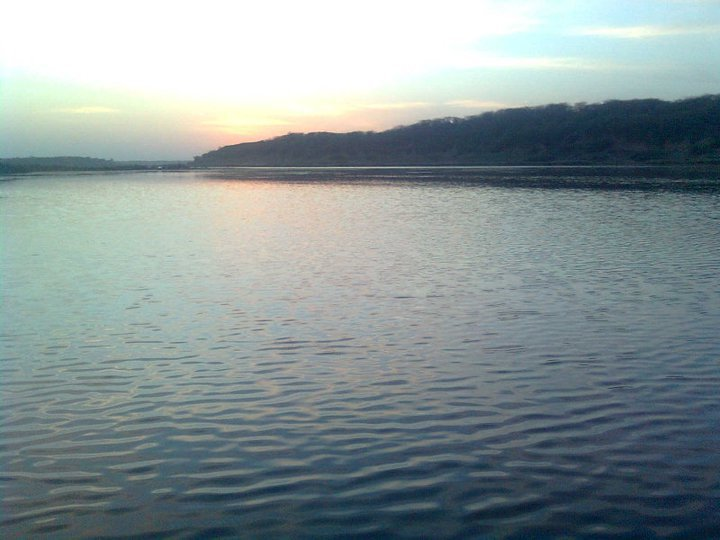
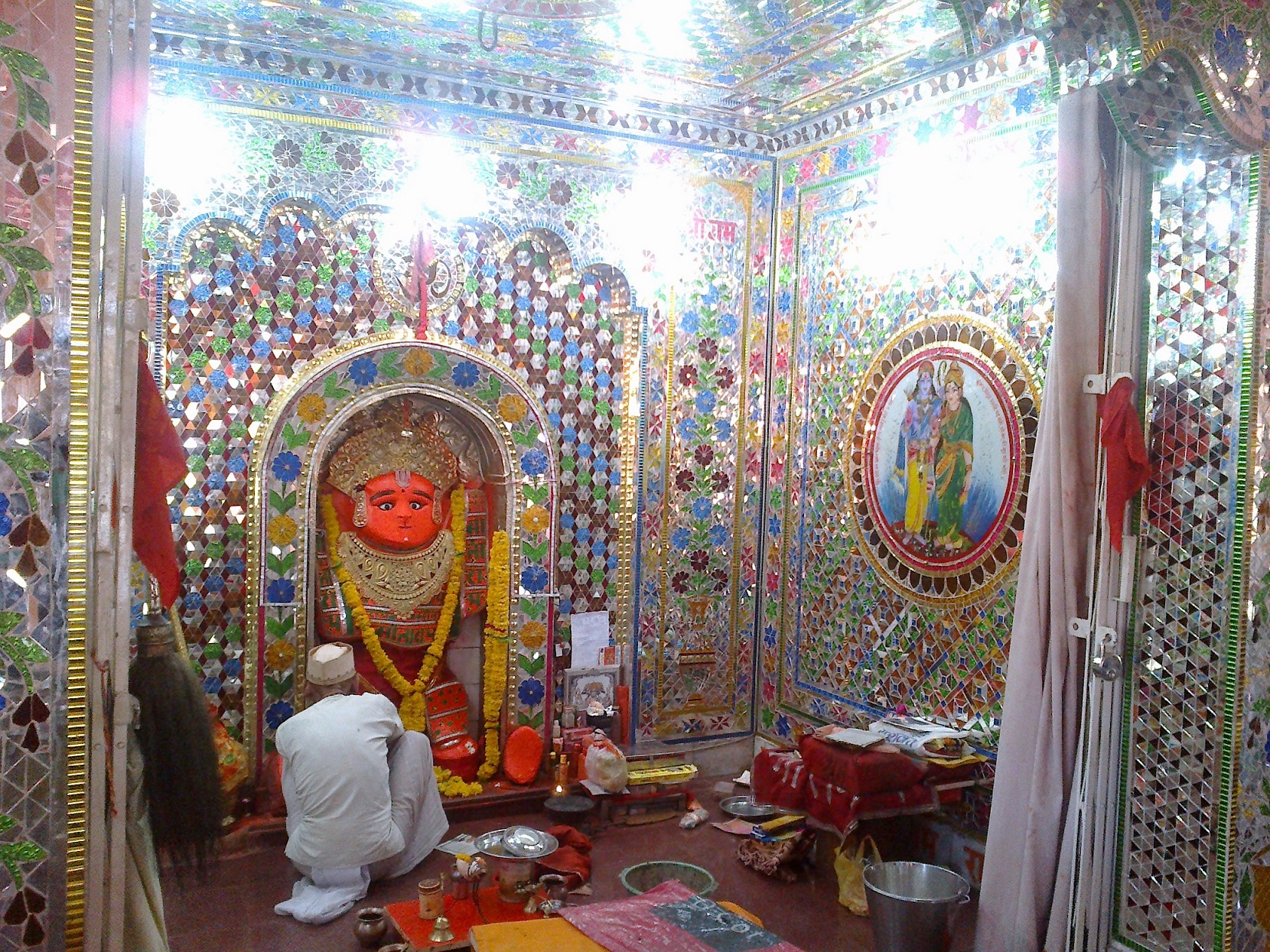
- Chillar dam Hill near Shajapur Maksi Jain temple Kali Sindh River Muradpura Hanuman, Shajapur

- Location of Shajapur district in Madhya Pradesh
- Coordinates (Shajapur): 23°30′N 76°15′E
- Country: India
- State: Madhya Pradesh
- Division: Ujjain
- Headquarters: Shajapur

Government
  - Collector: Shri. Riju Bafna, IAS
  - Lok Sabha constituencies: Dewas

Area
  - Total: 3,460 km^{2} (1,340 sq mi)

Population (2011)
  - Total: 941,403
  - Density: 272/km^{2} (705/sq mi)

Demographics
  - Literacy: 70.17 per cent
  - Sex ratio: 939
- Time zone: UTC+05:30 (IST)
- Website: shajapur.nic.in

Shajapur district (Hindi pronunciation: [ʃaːd͡ʒaːpʊɾ]) is a district in the state of Madhya Pradesh, located in central India. The town of Shajapur serves as the district headquarters. The district is part of the Ujjain Division.

== Geography ==
Shajapur district is situated in the northwestern part of the state and lies between latitudes 32"06' and 24" 19' north and longitudes 75" 41' and 77" 02' east. The district is bounded by Ujjain District to the west, Dewas and Sehore to the south and Rajgarh to the north. Shajapur district is part of Ujjain division. Kali Sindh River and Newaj River is major river's of District.

=== Other major towns ===
- Maksi
- Sundersi
- Akodia
- Berchha
- Bolai

== Demographics ==
Historical population
| Year | Pop. | ±% p.a. |
|---|---|---|
| 1901 | 305,863 | — |
| 1911 | 333,977 | +0.88% |
| 1921 | 327,959 | −0.18% |
| 1931 | 362,714 | +1.01% |
| 1941 | 408,279 | +1.19% |
| 1951 | 433,216 | +0.59% |
| 1961 | 526,135 | +1.96% |
| 1971 | 678,359 | +2.57% |
| 1981 | 840,247 | +2.16% |
| 1991 | 1,033,248 | +2.09% |
| 2001 | 1,290,685 | +2.25% |
| 2011 | 1,512,681 | +1.60% |

Religions in Shajapur district (2011)
| Religion | Percent |
| Hinduism | 85.20% |
| Islam | 13.96% |
| Jainism | 0.56% |
| Other or not stated | 0.28% |

According to the 2011 census, Shajapur District has a population of 1,512,681, roughly equal to the nation of Gabon or the US state of Hawaii. It is the 330th most populous of the 640 district in India. The district had a population density of 244 inhabitants per square kilometre (630/sq mi). Its population growth rate between 2001–2011 was 17.17%. Shajapur has a sex ratio of 939 females for every 1000 males, and a literacy rate of 70.17%.

After the separation of Agar Malwa district, the residual district had a population of 941,403, of which 176,219 (18.72%) resided in urban areas. Shajapur had a sex ratio of 931 females per 1000 males. Scheduled Castes and Scheduled Tribes make up 218,016 (23.95%) and 23,895 (2.54%) of the population respectively. Hindi is the most spoken language in the district, at 77.83%.

== Administrative Divisions ==
- Four development blocks in Shajapur district:
1. Shajapur
2. Shujalpur
3. Kalapipal Mandi
4. Mohan Barodia
- Seven Tehsil of District
1. Shajapur
2. Shujalpur
3. Kalapipal Mandi
4. Gulana
5. Mohan Barodia
6. Awantipur Barodiya
7. Polay Kalan

== Government ==
The Shajapur district is divided into 3 assembly constituencies.

- Shajapur
- Shujalpur
- Kalapipal

All assemblies are part of the Dewas Lok Sabha constituencies.

== Culture ==
=== Gareeb Nath Ka Mela ===
A 15-day fair is organized on Rangpanchami in Avantipur Barodiya, located Shujalpur Block in Shajapur district of Madhya Pradesh, here the fair is held in the dry premises of the Newaj river, where thousands of devotees reach.

== Notable sites ==
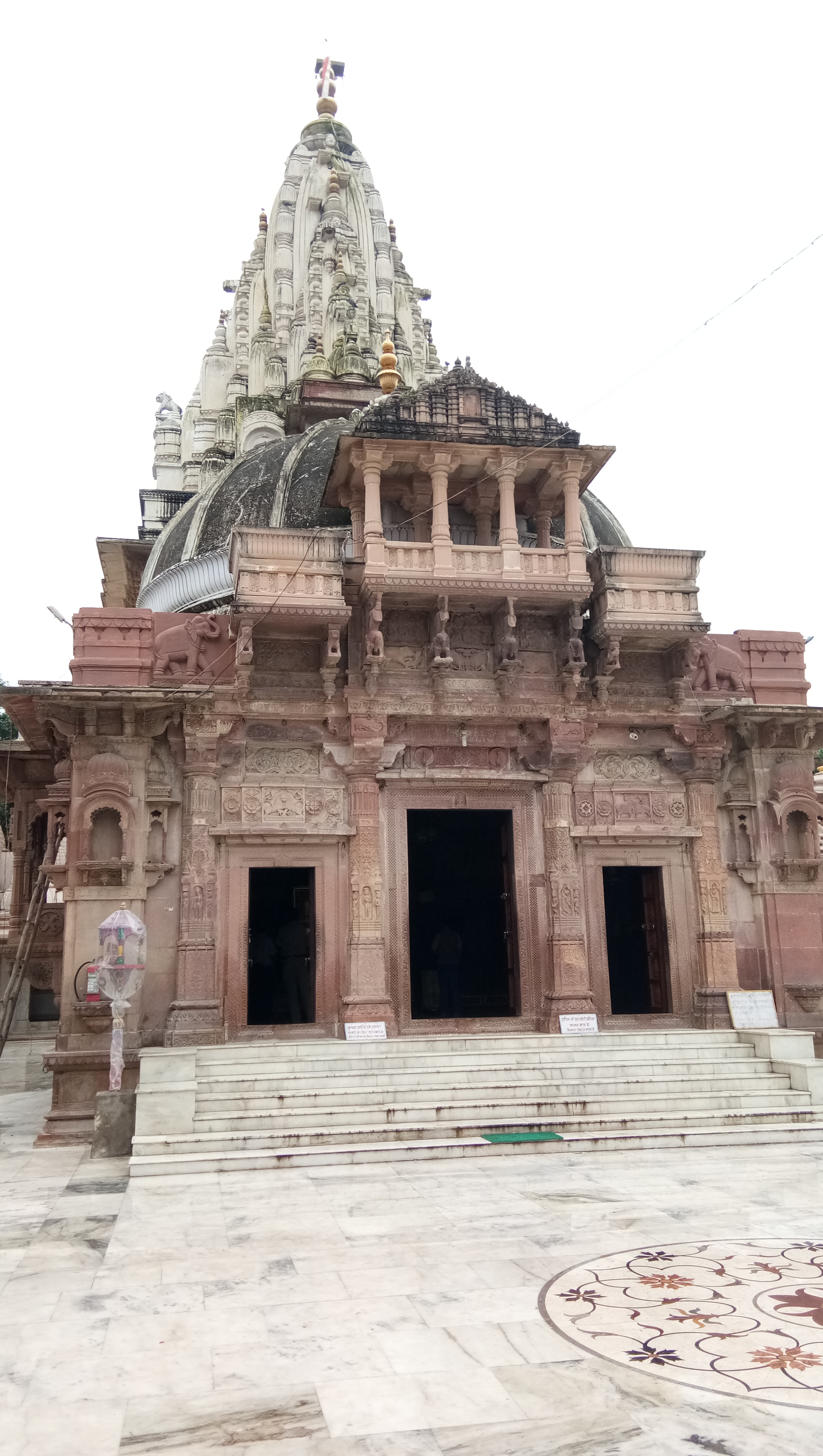
Maksi Jain Mandir

- Maksi Parshwnath Jain Mandir: Jain Tirtha Maksi Ji is 2500 years old, the present state of the temple is 700 years old and is dedicated to Raja Samprati Jain Tirthankar Adinath Ji.
- Rajrajeshwari Mata Mandir, Shajapur
- Siddhveer Hanuman Dham, Bolai, The Siddhaveer Hanuman Temple is a 300 year old miraculous temple; thousands of devotees come here to visit.

- Mahakaleshwar Temple, Sundersi
