= Alot Assembly constituency =

Constituency of the Madhya Pradesh legislative assembly in India

Coordinates: 23.76°N 75.56°E

Alot
- Constituency No. 223 for the Madhya Pradesh Legislative Assembly

Constituency details
- Country: India
- Region: Central India
- State: Madhya Pradesh
- District: Ratlam
- Lok Sabha constituency: Ujjain
- Established: 1957
- Reservation: None

Member of Legislative Assembly
- 16th Madhya Pradesh Legislative Assembly
- Incumbent Chintamani Malviya
- Party: Bhartiya Janta Party
- Elected year: 2023
- Preceded by: Manoj Chawla

Alot Assembly constituency is one of the 230 assembly constituencies of Madhya Pradesh, a central Indian state. Alot is also part of Ujjain Lok Sabha constituency.

== Members of Legislative Assembly ==
Election	Name	Party
1957	Devisingh	Indian National Congress
1962	Mayaram Nanda	Indian National Congress
1967	Madanlal	Bharatiya Jan Sangh
1972	Lila Devi Choudhary	Indian National Congress
1977	Lila Devi Choudhary	Janata Party
1980	Thawar Chand Gehlot	Bharatiya Janata Party
1985	Nathulal Sisodiya	Bharatiya Janata Party
1990	Thawar Chand Gehlot	Bharatiya Janata Party
1993	Thawar Chand Gehlot	Bharatiya Janata Party
1998	Manohar Untwal	Bharatiya Janata Party
2003	Premchand Guddu	Indian National Congress
2008	Manohar Untwal	Bharatiya Janata Party
2013	Jitendra Gehlot	Bharatiya Janata Party
2018	Manoj Chawla	Indian National Congress
2023	Chintamani Malviya	Bharatiya Janata Party

== Election results ==
=== 2023 ===
2023 Madhya Pradesh Legislative Assembly election: Alot
Party	Candidate	Votes	%	±%
BJP	Chintamani Malviya	106,762	57.44	+11.36
Independent	Premchand Guddu	37,878	20.38	
INC	Manoj Chawla	33,565	18.06	−31.36
ASP(KR)	Govardhan Parmar	3,417	1.84	
NOTA	None of the above	1,899	1.02	−0.48
Majority		68,884	37.06	+33.72
Turnout		185,873	83.65	+1.03
BJP gain from INC		Swing		

=== 2018 ===
2018 Madhya Pradesh Legislative Assembly election: Alot
Party	Candidate	Votes	%	±%
INC	Manoj Chawla	80,821	49.42	
BJP	Jitendra Thawarchand Gehlot	75,373	46.08	
Bahujan Sangharsh Dal	Mukesh Panchola Tal	1,687	1.03	
BSP	Vinod Katariya	1,565	0.96	
NOTA	None of the above	2,450	1.5	
Majority		5,448	3.34	
Turnout		163,555	82.62	
INC gain from BJP		Swing		

== See also ==
- Ratlam
- Alot
- Ujjain (Lok Sabha constituency)
