= Anil Jain Kaluheda =

Indian politician (born 1964)

Anil Jain Kaluheda (born 1964) is an Indian politician from Madhya Pradesh. He is an MLA from Ujjain North Assembly constituency in Ujjain District. He won the 2023 Madhya Pradesh Legislative Assembly election, representing the Bharatiya Janata Party.

== Early life and education ==
Kaluheda is from Ujjain South, Madhya Pradesh. He is the son of Shaitanmal Jain. He completed his M.Sc. in 1989 at Vikram University, Ujjain.

== Career ==
Kaluheda is a first time MLA who won from Ujjain North Assembly constituency representing Bharatiya Janata Party in the 2023 Madhya Pradesh Legislative Assembly election. He polled 93,535 votes and defeated his nearest rival, who is Maya Rajesh Trivedi of the Indian National Congress, by a margin of 27,513 votes.
