= Tarana Assembly constituency =

Constituency of the Madhya Pradesh legislative assembly in India

Coordinates: 23.34°N 76.04°E

Tarana
- Constituency No. 214 for the Madhya Pradesh Legislative Assembly

Constituency details
- Country: India
- Region: Central India
- State: Madhya Pradesh
- District: Ujjain
- Lok Sabha constituency: Ujjain
- Established: 1962
- Reservation: SC

Member of Legislative Assembly
- 16th Madhya Pradesh Legislative Assembly
- Incumbent Mahesh Parmar
- Party: Indian National Congress
- Elected year: 2023
- Preceded by: Anil Firojiya

Tarana is one of the 230 assembly constituencies of Madhya Pradesh a central Indian state. Tarana is also part of Ujjain Lok Sabha constituency.

== Members of the Legislative Assembly ==
Election	Name	Party
1967	M. Singh	Bharatiya Jana Sangh
1972	Lakshminarayan Jain	Indian National Congress
1977	Nagulal Malviya	Janata Party
1980	Durga Prasad Suryavanshi	Indian National Congress (Indira)
1985	Durga Prasad Suryavanshi	Indian National Congress
1990	Govind Parmar	Bharatiya Janata Party
1993	Madhav Prasad Shastri	Bharatiya Janata Party
1998	Babulal Malviya	Indian National Congress
2003	Tarachand Goyal	Bharatiya Janata Party
2008	Rodmal Rathore	Bharatiya Janata Party
2013	Anil Firojiya	Bharatiya Janata Party
2018	Mahesh Parmar	Indian National Congress
2023	Mahesh Parmar	Indian National Congress

== Election results ==
=== 2023 ===
2023 Madhya Pradesh Legislative Assembly election: Tarana
Party	Candidate	Votes	%	±%
INC	Mahesh Parmar	75,819	49.25	+0.87
BJP	Tarachand Goyal	73,636	47.83	+1.02
BSP	Jagdish Chouhan	1,738	1.13	+0.17
NOTA	None of the above	913	0.59	−0.79
Majority		2,183	1.42	−0.15
Turnout		153,953	82.03	+1.74
INC hold		Swing		

=== 2018 ===
2018 Madhya Pradesh Legislative Assembly election: Tarana
Party	Candidate	Votes	%	±%
INC	Mahesh Parmar	67,778	48.38	
BJP	Anil Firojiya	65,569	46.81	
BSP	Kailash Narvariya	1,347	0.96	
NOTA	None of the above	1,940	1.38	
Majority		2,209	1.57	
Turnout		140,081	80.29	
INC gain from		Swing		

== See also ==
- Ujjain
- Tarana
- Ujjain (Lok Sabha constituency)
