= Ujjain Lok Sabha constituency =

Lok Sabha Constituency in Madhya Pradesh, India

Coordinates: 23.2°N 75.8°E

Ujjain
- Lok Sabha constituency
- Interactive Map Outlining Ujjain Lok Sabha constituency

Constituency details
- Country: India
- Region: Central India
- State: Madhya Pradesh
- Assembly constituencies: Nagada-Khachrod; Mahidpur; Tarana; Ghatiya; Ujjain North; Ujjain South; Badnagar; Alot
- Established: 1952
- Reservation: SC

Member of Parliament
- 18th Lok Sabha
- Incumbent Anil Firojiya
- Party: Bharatiya Janata Party
- Elected year: 2024

Ujjain is one of the 29 Lok Sabha constituencies in the Indian state of Madhya Pradesh. It covers the entire Ujjain district and part of Ratlam district. This constituency came into existence in 1951 as one of the 9th Lok Sabha constituencies in the erstwhile Madhya Bharat state. It has been reserved for candidates belonging to scheduled castes since 1966.

== Vidhan Sabha segments ==
Presently, Ujjain Lok Sabha constituency comprises the following eight Vidhan Sabha (legislative assembly) segments:

| # | Name | District | Member | Party | 2024 Lead |
|---|---|---|---|---|---|
| 212 | Nagada-Khachrod | Ujjain | Dr.Tejbahadur singh Chauhan | BJP | BJP |
| 213 | Mahidpur | Ujjain | Dinesh Jain | INC | BJP |
| 214 | Tarana (SC) | Ujjain | Mahesh Parmar | INC | BJP |
| 215 | Ghatiya (SC) | Ujjain | Shatish Malaviya | BJP | BJP |
| 216 | Ujjain North | Ujjain | Anil Jain | BJP | BJP |
| 217 | Ujjain South | Ujjain | Dr.Mohan Yadav | BJP | BJP |
| 218 | Badnagar | Ujjain | Jitendra Pandya | BJP | BJP |
| 223 | Alot (SC) | Ratlam | Chintamani Malviya | BJP | BJP |

== Members of Parliament ==
| Year | Name | Party |
|---|---|---|
| 1952 | Radhelal Vyas | Indian National Congress |
| 1957 | Radhelal Vyas | Indian National Congress |
| 1962 | Radhelal Vyas | Indian National Congress |
| 1967 | Hukam Chand Kachwai | Bharatiya Jana Sangh |
| 1971 | Phool Chand Verma | Bharatiya Jana Sangh |
| 1977 | Hukam Chand Kachwai | Janata Party |
| 1980 | Satyanarayan Jatiya | Janata Party |
| 1984 | Satyanarayan Pawar | Indian National Congress |
| 1989 | Satyanarayan Jatiya | Bharatiya Janata Party |
| 1991 | Satyanarayan Jatiya | Bharatiya Janata Party |
| 1996 | Satyanarayan Jatiya | Bharatiya Janata Party |
| 1998 | Satyanarayan Jatiya | Bharatiya Janata Party |
| 1999 | Satyanarayan Jatiya | Bharatiya Janata Party |
| 2004 | Satyanarayan Jatiya | Bharatiya Janata Party |
| 2009 | Premchand Guddu | Indian National Congress |
| 2014 | Chintamani Malviya | Bharatiya Janata Party |
| 2019 | Anil Firojiya | Bharatiya Janata Party |
| 2024 | Anil Firojiya | Bharatiya Janata Party |

== Election results ==
Vote share of winning candidates
| 2024 | 64.0% |
| 2019 | 63.21% |
| 2014 | 63.07% |
| 2009 | 48.97% |
| 1991 | 54.40% |

=== 2024 ===
2024 Indian general election: Ujjain
| Party | Candidate | Votes | % | ±% |
|---|---|---|---|---|
| BJP | Anil Firojiya | 836,104 | 64.0 | +0.79 |
| INC | Mahesh Parmar | 4,60,244 | 35.2 | +1.19 |
| BSP | Advocate Prakash Chouhan | 9,518 | 0.72 | −0.13 |
| NOTA | None of the above | 9,332 | 0.7 | −0.11 |
| Majority | | 3,75,860 | 28.8 | −0.4 |
| Turnout | | 13,28,580 | 73.82 | −1.61 |
| BJP hold | | Swing | | |

=== 2019 ===
2019 Indian general elections: Ujjain
| Party | Candidate | Votes | % | ±% |
|---|---|---|---|---|
| BJP | Anil Firojiya | 791,663 | 63.21 | +0.14 |
| INC | Babulal Malviya | 4,26,026 | 34.01 | +1.40 |
| BSP | Satish Parmar | 10,698 | 0.85 | −0.13 |
| NOTA | None of the Above | 10,197 | 0.81 | −0.40 |
| Majority | | 3,65,637 | 29.20 | −1.26 |
| Turnout | | 12,53,063 | 75.43 | +8.80 |
| BJP hold | | Swing | +0.14 | |

=== 2014 ===
2014 Indian general elections: Ujjain
| Party | Candidate | Votes | % | ±% |
|---|---|---|---|---|
| BJP | Prof. Chintamani Malviya | 6,41,101 | 63.07 | +16.47 |
| INC | Premchand Guddu | 3,31,438 | 32.61 | −16.36 |
| BSP | Ramprasad Jatwa | 9,969 | 0.98 | −0.40 |
| AAP | Aneeta Hindoliya | 5,917 | 0.58 | New |
| BASD | Anil Pale | 4,439 | 0.44 | New |
| NOTA | None of the Above | 12,287 | 1.21 | New |
| Majority | | 3,09,663 | 30.46 | +28.09 |
| Turnout | | 10,16,405 | 66.63 | +13.39 |
| BJP gain from INC | | Swing | +14.10 | |

=== 2009 ===
2009 Indian general elections: Ujjain
| Party | Candidate | Votes | % | ±% |
|---|---|---|---|---|
| INC | Premchand Guddu | 3,26,905 | 48.97 | |
| BJP | Dr Satyanarayan Jatiya | 3,11,064 | 46.59 | |
| BSP | Baboolal Thawaliya | 9,224 | 1.38 | |
| Majority | | 15,841 | 2.37 | |
| Turnout | | 6,67,533 | 53.25 | |
| INC gain from BJP | | Swing | | |

=== 1991 ===
1991 Indian general election: Ujjain
| Party | Candidate | Votes | % | ±% |
|---|---|---|---|---|
| BJP | Satyanarayan Jatiya | 238,904 | 54.40 | |
| INC | Sajjan Singh Verma | 187,184 | 42.63 | |
| JD | Vimla Choudhary | 2,382 | 0.54 | |
| Independent | Kamal Chand Laskari | 2,244 | 0.51 | |
| Majority | | 51,720 | 11.77 | |
| Turnout | | 4,39,140 | 49.23 | |
| BJP hold | | Swing | | |

== See also ==
- List of constituencies of the Lok Sabha
