= Dewas Lok Sabha constituency =

Lok Sabha Constituency in Madhya Pradesh, India

Coordinates: 23.0°N 76.4°E

Dewas
- Lok Sabha constituency
- Interactive Map Outlining Dewas Lok Sabha constituency

Constituency details
- Country: India
- Region: Central India
- State: Madhya Pradesh
- Assembly constituencies: Ashta; Agar; Shajapur; Shujalpur; Kalapipal; Sonkatch; Dewas; Hatpipliya
- Established: 1961–1967; 2008–
- Total electors: 1,296,627
- Reservation: SC

Member of Parliament
- 18th Lok Sabha
- Incumbent Mahendra Solanki
- Party: Bharatiya Janata Party
- Elected year: 2024
- Preceded by: Manohar Untwal

Dewas is one of the 29 Lok Sabha (parliamentary) constituencies in the Indian state of Madhya Pradesh. This constituency came into existence in 2008 as a part of the implementation of delimitation of parliamentary constituencies. Following delimitation, Shajapur constituency ceased to exist and Dewas constituency came into being. This constituency is reserved for the candidates belonging to the Scheduled castes and covers parts of Sehore, Shajapur, Agar Malwa and Dewas districts.

Since May 2024, the Member of Parliament for this constituency is Mahendra Solanki whose term is expected to last until May 2029.

== Assembly segments ==
Presently, Dewas Lok Sabha constituency comprises the following eight legislative assembly segments:

| # | Name | District | Member | Party | 2024 Lead |
|---|---|---|---|---|---|
| 157 | Ashta (SC) | Sehore | Gopal Singh | BJP | BJP |
| 166 | Agar (SC) | Agar Malwa | Madhav Singh Gehlot | BJP | BJP |
| 167 | Shajapur | Shajapur | Arun Bhimawad | BJP | BJP |
| 168 | Shujalpur | Shajapur | Inder Singh Parmar | BJP | BJP |
| 169 | Kalapipal | Shajapur | Ghanshyam Chandravanshi | BJP | BJP |
| 170 | Sonkatch (SC) | Dewas | Rajesh Sonkar | BJP | BJP |
| 171 | Dewas | Dewas | Gayatri Raje Pawar | BJP | BJP |
| 172 | Hatpipliya | Dewas | Manoj Choudhary | BJP | BJP |

Agar, Shajapur, Shujalpur, Dewas, Sonkatch and Hatpipliya Assembly segments were earlier part of the erstwhile Shajapur Lok Sabha constituency, while Ashta segment was earlier part of Bhopal Lok Sabha constituency.

== Members of Parliament ==
| Year | Member | Party |
|---|---|---|
| 1962 | Hukam Chand Kachwai | Bharatiya Jana Sangh |
1967-2008 : See Shajapur
| 2009 | Sajjan Singh Verma | Indian National Congress |
| 2014 | Manohar Untwal | Bharatiya Janata Party |
| 2019 | Mahendra Solanki | Bharatiya Janata Party |
| 2024 | Mahendra Solanki | Bharatiya Janata Party |

== Election results ==
=== 2024 ===
2024 Indian general election: Dewas
| Party | Candidate | Votes | % | ±% |
|---|---|---|---|---|
| BJP | Mahendra Solanki | 925,917 | 63.32 | +1.7 |
| INC | Rajendra Malaviya | 5,02,548 | 34.29 | −0.73 |
| BSP | Rajendra Singh Chokhutiya | 11,203 | 0.76 | −0.55 |
| NOTA | None of the above | 10,389 | 0.71 | +0.06 |
| Majority | | 4,25,225 | 29.03 | +2.43 |
| Turnout | | 14,69,104 | | |
| BJP hold | | Swing | | |

=== 2019 ===
2019 Indian general elections: Dewas
| Party | Candidate | Votes | % | ±% |
|---|---|---|---|---|
| BJP | Mahendra Solanki | 862,429 | 61.62 | +3.43 |
| INC | Prahlad Singh Tipanya | 490,180 | 35.02 | −0.41 |
| BSP | Badrilal Akela | 18,338 | 1.31 | −0.20 |
| NOTA | None of the Above | 9,034 | 0.65 | −0.35 |
| Majority | | 372,249 | 26.60 | +3.84 |
| Turnout | | 1,398,946 | 79.46 | +8.72 |
| BJP hold | | Swing | | |

=== 2014 ===
2014 Indian general elections: Dewas
| Party | Candidate | Votes | % | ±% |
|---|---|---|---|---|
| BJP | Manohar Untwal | 665,646 | 58.19 | ▲10.13 |
| INC | Sajjan Singh Verma | 405,333 | 35.43 | ▼12.66 |
| BSP | Gokul Prasad Dongare | 17,238 | 1.51 | ▲0.14 |
| NOTA | None of the Above | 10,253 | 0.90 | ▲0.90 |
| Majority | | 260,313 | 22.76 | ▲20.79 |
| Turnout | | 1,143,970 | 70.74 | ▲10.39 |
| BJP gain from INC | | Swing | | |

=== 2009 ===
2009 Indian general elections: Dewas
| Party | Candidate | Votes | % | ±% |
|---|---|---|---|---|
| INC | Sajjan Singh Verma | 376,421 | 48.06 | |
| BJP | Thawarchand Gehlot | 360,964 | 46.09 | |
| BSP | Bhagirath Parihar | 10,743 | 1.37 | |
| Majority | | 15,457 | 1.97 | |
| Turnout | | 782,929 | 60.35 | |
| INC gain from BJP | | Swing | | |

=== 1962 ===
1962 Indian general election: Dewas
| Party | Candidate | Votes | % | ±% |
|---|---|---|---|---|
| ABJS | Hukumchand Kacchaway | 106,706 | 46.49 | |
| INC | Kanhaiyalal | 99,557 | 43.38 | |
| RRP | Ramlal | 23,240 | 10.13 | |
| Majority | | 7,149 | 3.11 | |
| Turnout | | 229,503 | 54.81 | |
| ABJS win (new seat) | | | | |

== See also ==
- Shajapur (Lok Sabha constituency)
- Dewas district
- List of constituencies of the Lok Sabha
