= Mahidpur Assembly constituency =

Constituency of the Madhya Pradesh legislative assembly in India

Coordinates: 23.49°N 75.66°E

Mahidpur
- Constituency No. 213 for the Madhya Pradesh Legislative Assembly

Constituency details
- Country: India
- Region: Central India
- State: Madhya Pradesh
- District: Ujjain
- Lok Sabha constituency: Ujjain
- Established: 1957
- Reservation: None

Member of Legislative Assembly
- 16th Madhya Pradesh Legislative Assembly
- Incumbent Dinesh Jain
- Party: Indian National Congress
- Elected year: 2023
- Preceded by: Bahadur Singh Chouhan

Mahidpur Assembly constituency is one of the 230 assembly constituencies of Madhya Pradesh a central Indian state. Mahidpur is also part of Ujjain Lok Sabha constituency.

== Members of Legislative Assembly ==
Election	Name	Party
1957	Totala Rameshwar Dayal Mahadeo	Indian National Congress
1962	Durgadas Bhagwandas	Indian National Congress
1967	Ramchandra	Bharatiya Jana Sangh
1972	Narayan Prasad Sharma	Indian National Congress
1977	Shiv Narayan Choudhry	Janata Party
1980	Anandilal Chhajalani	Indian National Congress (Indira)
1985	Nathulal Sisodiya	Bharatiya Janata Party
1990	Babulal Jain	Bharatiya Janata Party
1993	Babulal Jain	Bharatiya Janata Party
1998	Kalpana Parulekar	Indian National Congress
2003	Bahadur Singh Chouhan	Bharatiya Janata Party
2008	Kalpana Parulekar	Indian National Congress
2013	Bahadur Singh Chouhan	Bharatiya Janata Party
2018	Bahadur Singh Chouhan	Bharatiya Janata Party
2023	Dinesh Jain	Indian National Congress

== Election results ==
=== 2023 ===
2023 Madhya Pradesh Legislative Assembly election: Mahidpur
Party	Candidate	Votes	%	±%
INC	Dinesh Jain Boss	75,454	42.57	+28.32
BJP	Bahadur Singh Chouhan	75,164	42.41	−2.28
Independent	Pratap Singh Arya	20,662	11.66	
NOTA	None of the above	1,417	0.8	−0.62
Majority		290	0.16	−9.51
Turnout		177,232	82.36	+1.26
INC gain from BJP		Swing		

=== 2018 ===
2018 Madhya Pradesh Legislative Assembly election: Mahidpur
Party	Candidate	Votes	%	±%
BJP	Bhadur Singh Chouhan	70,241	44.69	
Independent	Dinesh Jain Boss	55,052	35.02	
INC	Sardarsingh Chouhan	22,393	14.25	
Independent	Shakir Kha	4,238	2.7	
BSP	Rameshchandra Bamanawat	1,515	0.96	
NOTA	None of the above	2,225	1.42	
Majority		15,189	9.67	
Turnout		157,187	81.1	
BJP hold		Swing		

== See also ==
- Ujjain
- Mahidpur
- Ujjain (Lok Sabha constituency)
