= Hukam Chand Kachwai =

Indian politician

Hukamchand Munnalal Kachwai
- हुकमचंद मुन्नालाल कछवाए
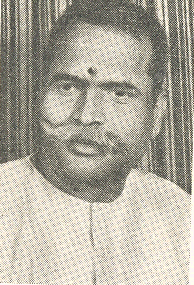

Member of Parliament for 2nd, 3rd, 4th & 5th Lok Sabha

Personal details
- Born: Hukamchand Munnalal Kachwai; 23 July 1933 Ujjain, Ujjain district, Rewa State, British India
- Died: 1996 (aged 62–63) Ujjain, Ujjain district, Madhya Pradesh, India
- Citizenship: Indian
- Party: Bhartiya Janata Party
- Other political affiliations: Bharatiya Jana Sangh; Janata Party; Indian National Congress
- Spouse: Ram Kumari Kachwai (m. 21 November 1961)
- Domestic partner: Pratap Singh
- Children: 4 son; 1 daughter
- Parent: Munnalal Kachwai (father)
- Occupation: Agriculturist
- Profession: Politician

Hukam Chand Kachwai (July 23, 1933 – 1996) was a leader of Bharatiya Janata Party, Social worker, trade unionist and a former member of Lok Sabha from Madhya Pradesh. Kachwai participated in Satyagraha and jailed for two months. To fulfill the demamnds of the workers of Shri Gopal Paper Mills, Kachwai went on 28 days hunger strike and again jailed for 57 days. Kachwai was jailed several times in the connections with politicals movements and remained detained for 19 months during Emergency in India.

Hukam Chand Kachwai is the fist indian Member of Parliament who raised the questions in Indian Parliament to develop the Atom Bomb in India to make the country powerful but he was opposed hard by MPs of Indian National Congress party.

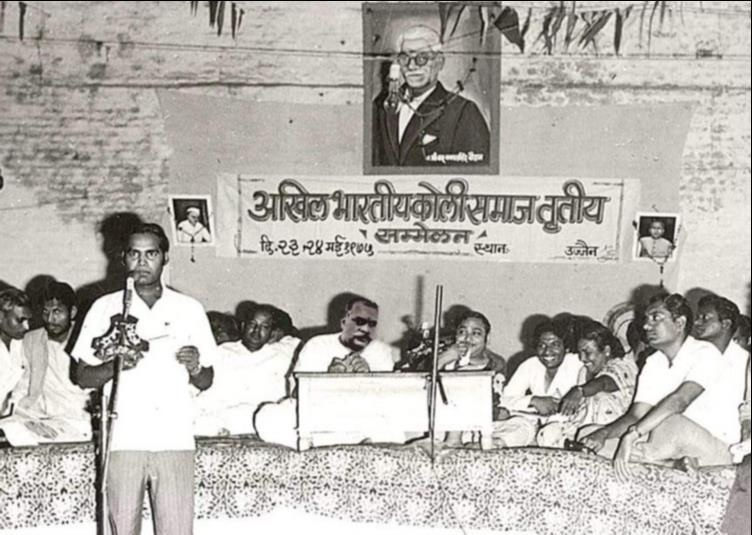
President Ram Nath Kovind (as young man) speaking in 3rd meeting of Koli society in Ujjain and Hukam Chand Kachwai seating on stage in centre (left of table).jpg

== Life ==
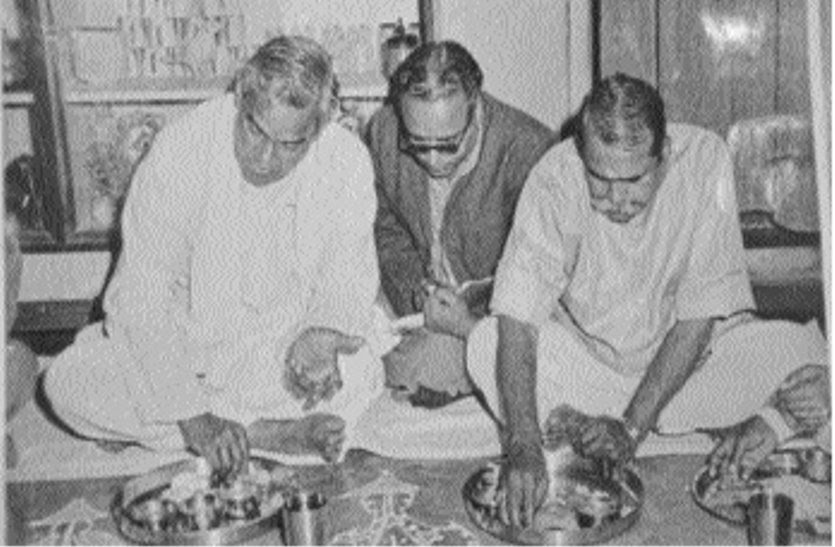
Atal Bihari Vajpayee enjoying dal-bati-laddu at the residence of then MP Hukamchand Kachhwai (right-most) in Bahadurganj in 1977

Hukam Chand Kachwai was born in Ujjain, Madhya Pradesh. He was elected MP from Morena and Shajapur. Whereas, he was MP from Ujjain for two terms. After the formation of Janata Party and BJP, he left the party and joined the Congress in the 1990s, due to a tussle over policy issues.

Former Indian President Ram Nath Kovind was a close aid to Hukam Chand Kachwai and after the death of Kachwai, Kovind became emotional during his visit to Ujjain. In 1974, Kachwai fixed the marriage of Ram Nath Kovind, with Savita Kovind.

He was a Member of the Third, Fourth, Fifth and Sixth Lok Sabha representing Dewas, Ujjain, Morena and Ujjain Parliamentary constituencies. He died in 1996. He belonged to the Koli community of Madhya Pradesh.

== Other posts held ==
- 1964 - president of Bhartiya railway majdoor Sangh
- 1969, president of Delhi Milk Scheme Employees Union
- 1969, Bhartiya majdur parivahan Sangh
- 1969, Group commander of Seva Dal Ujjain
- 1969, Member of Rashtriya Swayamsevak Sangh
- 1969, Patron of New Delhi Municipal Employees Union
- 1969 - 1971, president of All India Ticket Checking Staff Association Western Railway
- 1969 - 1971, Western Indian Railway Guards association
- 1973 - 1975, Vice-President of Akhil Bhartiya Kshatriya Koli Samaj
- Member of Committee on the Welfare of Scheduled Castes and Scheduled Tribes

== Social activities ==
- 1950 - 1952, Hukam Chand Kachwai Collected food and clothing in Ujjain to help the refugees from East Pakistan
- 1952, Kachwai provided help to the victims of famine in Jhabua region of Madhya Pradesh and took part in Anti-Cow-Slaughter Movement

1957, active Member of the Seva Samiti

- 1957 - till death, worked actively for the eradication of evils of drinking, gambling and child marriage amongst the Koli community.

== Tribute ==
- In Ujjain, a trust is running in the respect of Hukamchand Munnalal Kachwai names as Hukam Chand Kachwai memorial trust.

Lok Sabha
New constituency	Member of Lok Sabha for Dewas; 1962–1967	Vacant District suspended between 1967-2009 Title next held by Sajjan Singh Verma
