= Satyanarayan Pawar =

Indian politician

Satyanarayan Asharamji Pawar
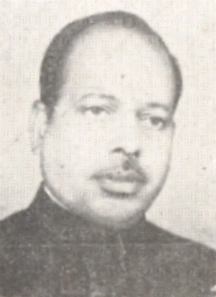
- Satyanarayan Asharamji Pawar

Member of Parliament, 8th Lok Sabha
- In office 1984–1989
- President: Zail Singh
- Prime Minister: Rajiv Gandhi
- Vice President: Ramaswamy Venkataraman
- Preceded by: Satyanarayan Jatiya
- Succeeded by: Satyanarayan Jatiya
- Constituency: Ujjain

Personal details
- Born: Satyanarayan Asharamji Pawar; 13 February 1944 (age 82) Ujjain, Gwalior State, British Indian Empire
- Party: Indian National Congress
- Spouse(s): Smt. Basantibai Pawar (Married, 17 May 1967)
- Children: 2 sons, 3 daughters
- Parent: Asharamji Pawar (father)
- Occupation: Industrialist

Satyanarayan Asharamji Pawar is an Indian politician, social worker and former Member of Parliament of 8th Lok Sabha of Madhya Pradesh state of India.

Pawar belongs to Koli caste of Madhya Pradesh. in June 2022, he was appointed as head of Central Election Committee by Indian National Congress party.
