= Sanwer Assembly constituency =

Constituency of the Madhya Pradesh legislative assembly in India

Coordinates: 22.97°N 75.83°E

Sanwer
- Constituency No. 211 for the Madhya Pradesh Legislative Assembly

Constituency details
- Country: India
- Region: Central India
- State: Madhya Pradesh
- District: Indore
- Lok Sabha constituency: Indore
- Established: 1962
- Reservation: SC

Member of Legislative Assembly
- 16th Madhya Pradesh Legislative Assembly
- Incumbent Tulsi Ram Silawat
- Party: Bharatiya Janata Party
- Elected year: 2023
- Preceded by: Rajesh Sonkar

Sanwer is one of the 230 Vidhan Sabha (Legislative Assembly) constituencies of Madhya Pradesh state in central India. It is reserved for the candidates belonging to the Scheduled caste from its inception.

== Overview ==
Sanwer Assembly constituency is one of the eight Vidhan Sabha constituencies located in Indore district which comes under Indore (Lok Sabha constituency). Constituency includes Sanwer, Kanadia, Khudail, Khajrana, Lasudia Mori, Talawali Chanda Patwar of Indore city.

== Members of the Legislative Assembly ==
Election	Name	Party
1962	Sajjan Singh Vishnar	Indian National Congress
1967	Babu Lal Rathore	Bharatiya Jan Sangh
1972	Radhakishan Malviya	Indian National Congress
1977	Arjun Singh Dharu	Janata Party
1980	Prakash Sonkar	Bharatiya Janata Party
1985	Tulsi Ram Silawat	Bharatiya Janata Party
1990	Prakash Sonkar	Bharatiya Janata Party
1993	Prakash Sonkar	Bharatiya Janata Party
1998	Premchand Guddu	Indian National Congress
2003	Prakash Sonkar	Bharatiya Janata Party
2008	Tulsi Ram Silawat	Indian National Congress
2013	Rajesh Sonkar	Bharatiya Janata Party
2018	Tulsi Ram Silawat	Indian National Congress
2020	Tulsi Ram Silawat	Bharatiya Janata Party
2023	Tulsi Ram Silawat	Bharatiya Janata Party

by-election

== Election results ==
=== 2023 ===
2023 Madhya Pradesh Legislative Assembly election: Sanwer
Party	Candidate	Votes	%	±%
BJP	Tulsi Ram Silawat	151,048	61.7	+14.8
INC	Reena Bourasi Didi	82,194	33.57	−14.81
ASP(KR)	Vinod Yadav Ambedkar	7,314	2.99	
NOTA	None of the above	2,119	0.87	−0.43
Majority		68,854	28.13	+26.65
Turnout		244,810	80.94	+0.05
BJP hold		Swing		

=== 2020 bypoll ===
2020 Madhya Pradesh Legislative Assembly by-elections: Sanwer
Party	Candidate	Votes	%	±%
BJP	Tulsi Ram Silawat	129,676	61.01	
INC	Premchand Guddu	76,412	35.95	
BSP	Vikram Singh Gehlot	2,135	1.0	
NOTA	None of the above	1,984	0.93	
Majority		53,264	25.06	
Turnout		212,562	78.62	
BJP gain from INC		Swing		

=== 2018 ===
2018 Madhya Pradesh Legislative Assembly election: Sanwer
Party	Candidate	Votes	%	±%
INC	Tulsi Ram Silawat	96,535	48.38	
BJP	Rajesh Sonkar	93,590	46.9	
BSP	Kamal Chouhan	2,844	1.43	
NOTA	None of the above	2,591	1.3	
Majority		2,945	1.48	
Turnout		199,546	80.89	
BJP gain from		Swing		

=== 1998 ===
1998 Madhya Pradesh Legislative Assembly election: Sawer
Party	Candidate	Votes	%	±%
INC	Premchand Guddu	47,865	50.96	
BJP	Prakash Sonkar	44,421	47.29	
BSP	Surendra Solanki	624	0.66	
Independent	Pradeep Varma	374	0.40	
Independent	Kamal Parmar	168	0.18	
Majority		3,444	3.67	
Turnout		93,927	65.50	
INC gain from BJP		Swing		

== See also ==
- Indore
- Indore (Lok Sabha constituency)
