= Badnagar Assembly constituency =

Constituency of the Madhya Pradesh legislative assembly in India

Coordinates: 23.05°N 75.38°E

Badnagar
- Constituency No. 218 for the Madhya Pradesh Legislative Assembly

Constituency details
- Country: India
- Region: Central India
- State: Madhya Pradesh
- District: Ujjain
- Lok Sabha constituency: Ujjain
- Established: 1977
- Reservation: None

Member of Legislative Assembly
- 16th Madhya Pradesh Legislative Assembly
- Incumbent Jitendra Pandya
- Party: Bharatiya Janata Party
- Elected year: 2023
- Preceded by: Murli Morwal

Badnagar is one of the 230 assembly constituencies of Madhya Pradesh a central Indian state. Badnagar is also part of Ujjain Lok Sabha constituency.

== Members of the Legislative Assembly ==
Election	Name	Party
1977	Uday Singh Panday	Janata Party
1980	Uday Singh Panday	Bharatiya Janata Party
1985	Abhay Singh	Indian National Congress
1990	Uday Singh Panday	Bharatiya Janata Party
1993	Surender Singh Sisodiya	Indian National Congress
1998	Virendra Singh Sisodiya	Indian National Congress
2003	Shantilal Dhabai	Bharatiya Janata Party
2008	Shantilal Dhabai	Bharatiya Janata Party
2013	Mukesh Pandya	Bharatiya Janata Party
2018	Murli Morwal	Indian National Congress
2023	Jitendra Pandya	Bharatiya Janata Party

== Election results ==
=== 2023 ===
2023 Madhya Pradesh Legislative Assembly election: Badnagar
Party	Candidate	Votes	%	±%
BJP	Jitendra Pandya	80,728	46.96	+1.03
INC	Murli Morwal	44,035	25.62	−23.77
Independent	Rajendra Singh Solanki	31,005	18.04	
Independent	Prakash Goud	10,480	6.1	
BSP	Nirbhay Singh Chandravanshi	3,307	1.92	+1.01
NOTA	None of the above	1,624	0.94	+0.01
Majority		36,693	21.34	+17.88
Turnout		171,904	84.39	+1.61
BJP gain from INC		Swing		

=== 2018 ===
2018 Madhya Pradesh Legislative Assembly election: Badnagar
Party	Candidate	Votes	%	±%
INC	Murli Morwal	76,802	49.39	
BJP	Sanjay Sharma	71,421	45.93	
BSP	Dashrath Sarvate	1,415	0.91	
NOTA	None of the above	1,442	0.93	
Majority		5,381	3.46	
Turnout		155,489	82.78	
INC gain from		Swing		

== See also ==
- Ujjain
- Badnagar
- Ujjain (Lok Sabha constituency)
