= Tarachand Goyal =

Indian politician

Tarachand Goyal "Mechanic" is an Indian politician and member of the Bharatiya Janata Party. Goyal is a member of the Madhya Pradesh Legislative Assembly from the Tarana constituency in Ujjain district.
