= Rajesh Sonkar =

Indian politician

Dr. Rajesh Sonkar
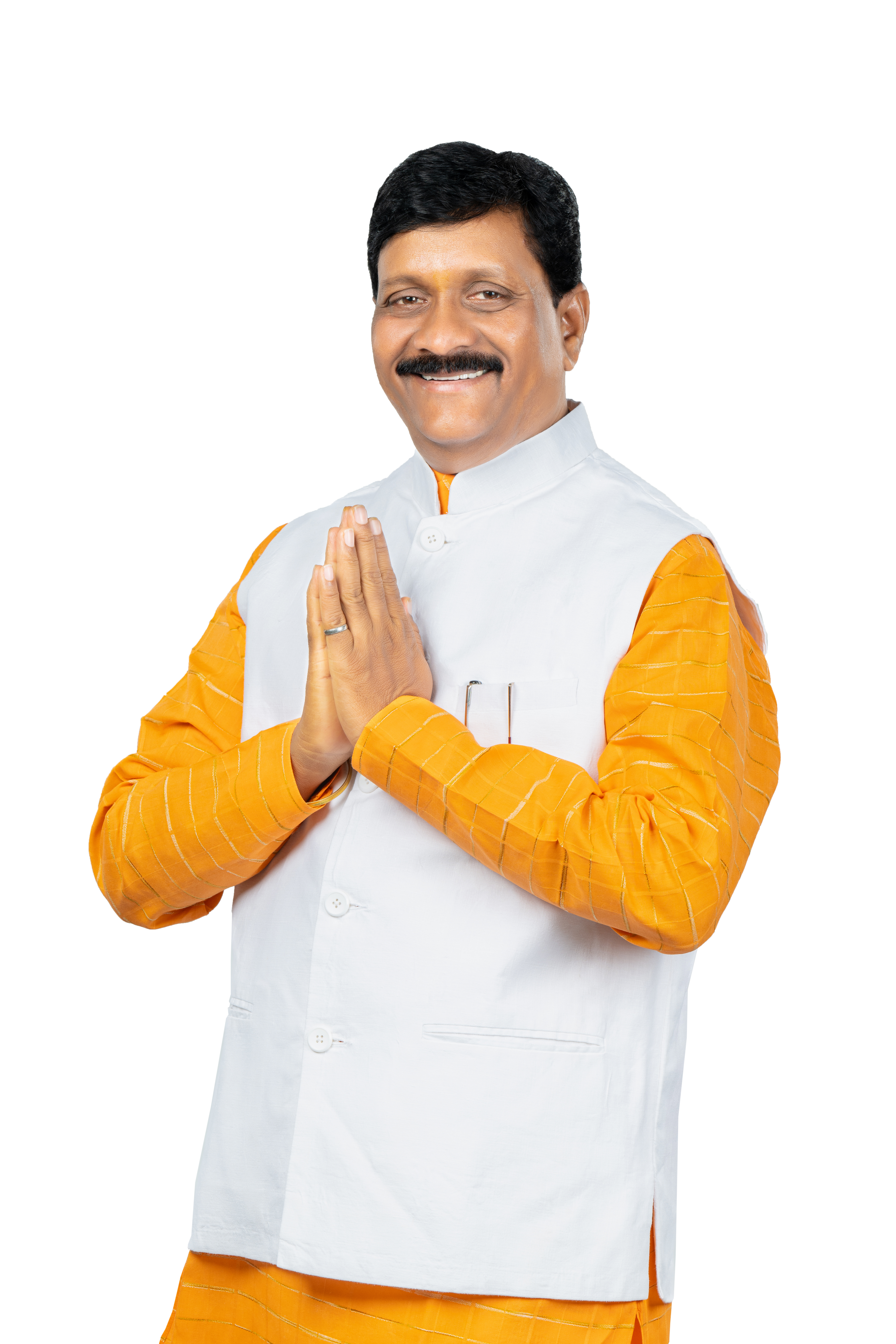
- Dr. Sonkar in 2024

Member of the Madhya Pradesh Legislative Assembly
- Incumbent
- Assumed office 3 December 2023
- Preceded by: Sajjan Singh Verma
- Constituency: Sonkatch
- In office 10 December 2013 – December 2018
- Succeeded by: Tulsiram Silawat
- Constituency: Sanwer

Personal details
- Born: 9 December 1968 (age 57) Indore, Madhya Pradesh, India
- Party: Bharatiya Janata Party
- Spouse: Smt. Namrata Sonkar
- Parent: Late Shri Nanakchand Sonkar (father)
- Education: Doctor of Philosophy( Ph.D) In 2014 From Devi Ahilya University Indore M.A. LL.B. Indore Christian College (DAVV)
- Profession: Politician

Rajesh Sonkar is an Indian politician, and currently a member of Bharatiya Janta Party (BJP), currently serving as an MLA from Sonkatch constituency, defeating Sajjan Singh Verma from over 25,000 votes. Earlier he served as state president (2020–2023) from same party. In 2018 elections he faced defeat from Sanwer constituency, losing to Mr. Tulsi Silawat from under 2,200 votes. In 2013 elections he won against Mr. Tulsi Silawat from Sanwer from little under 40,000 votes. Earlier, he served as a state vice-president of Bhartiya Janta Yuva Morcha youth wing of BJP and state vice-president for BJP Morcha. He is a prominent leader of BJP and is quite close to Rashtriya Swayamsevak Sangh and its roots.

== Early life and education ==
Sonkar was born in a Khatik family to Nanakchand Sonkar and his wife Gulab Bai Sonkar in Indore City and belongs to the Khatik community. He did philosophy (Ph.D) from Devi Ahilya Vishwavidyalaya, Indore. He studied law from DAVV and is a lawyer by profession.
