= Nageshwar Parshwanath Tirth =

Śvetāmbara Jain Temple in Rajasthan, India

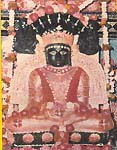
- Parshwanath Idol inside the temple

- Location within Rajasthan

Religion
- Affiliation: Jainism
- Sect: Śvetāmbara
- Deity: Parshvanatha
- Festival: Mahavir Jayanti
- Governing body: Shri Jain Shwetamber Nageshwar Parshwanath Tirth Pedhi

Location
- Location: Unhel, Jhalawar district, Rajasthan
- Interactive map of Nageshwar Parshwanath Tirth
- Coordinates: 23°49′21.55″N 75°35′30.19″E

Architecture
- Creator: King Ajeetsen and Queen Padmavati

Website
- www.nageshwartirth.org

Shri Nageshwar Parshwanath Tirth or Shri Jain Shwetamber Nageshwar Parshwanath Tirth is a Jain Temple situated in Unhel, Jhalawar district, Rajasthan. This temple is dedicated to Parshvanatha, the 23rd Tirthankara. It is managed by Shri Jain Shwetamber Nageshwar Parshvanath Tirth Pedhi.

== Temple ==
The temple is situated on the border of Madhya Pradesh and Rajasthan State. The ancient name of this tirth is Virampur. This ancient temple was around 1200–1300 years ago. The temple was renovated in 1207(V.S. 1264) by Jain Acharya Shri Abhay Devsuri. The temple belongs to the Shwetamber sect. of Jainism. This temple is made of white marble and is considered very miraculous. There is provision for accommodation with all modern facilities in the temple and bhojanlya. The temple also manages a goushala known as Shri Nageshwar Parshwantha Goushala.

== Main idol ==
Moolnayak of this temple is a 13½ feet tall green colored idol of Parshwanath in Kayotsarga with a hood of 7 cobra carved from a single emerald stone. The idol is believed to be around 2850 years old and said to have been crafted by Dharnendra himself. It is believed that the idol is of the same height as Parshvanath in reality. The idol also has fine carvings of lotus leaves, deer, lion, dharamchakra etc. According to folklore this idol was earlier made up of gold and was later converted to stone by Dharnendra on the advice of a Jain acharya to protect it from being stolen. The idol is also known as 'Nagababa'. 4 feet tall idols of Lord Shri Shantinath Swami and Lord Shri Mahavir Swami are present on either side of the main idol. It is said that behind the 7 hoods of the snake spread over the idol's head is a hole which houses a snake and The snake is rarely seen coming out from its hole. Inside the main temple, there are 24 Jinalayas, with statues of the 24 tirthankars duly seated. Idols of Shri Simandhar Swami, Shri Padmavatidevi and Shri Mani Bhadra Veer are also present in the temple.
