= Nagda district =

Proposed district of Madhya Pradesh

Nagda district नागदा जिला
- Proposed district of Madhya Pradesh
- Country: India
- State: Madhya Pradesh
- Headquarters: Nagda

Government
  - Lok Sabha constituencies: Ujjain (Lok Sabha constituency)
  - Vidhan Sabha constituencies: Nagada-Kharcharod, Mahidpur,
- Time zone: UTC+05:30 (IST)

Nagda district (Hindi: नागदा जिला, Nāgdā zilā) is a proposed district to be created in Madhya Pradesh, India. The district headquarters would be Nagda.

In 2008, Madhya Pradesh MLA Dilip Gurjar, who represents the city of Nagda, moved to create Nagda district, but this was rejected.

In June 2019, the Government of Madhya Pradesh announced its intention to create the district in the near future. Under this proposal, Nagda district will be created from four tehsils: Nagda, Khacharod, and Mahidpur of Ujjain district, and Alot of Ratlam district. In March 2020, the cabinet of Madhya Pradesh gave "in-principle approval" to the district's formation.

== Tourist places ==
- Nagda hills
- Birla Mandir
