= Karaudia =

Karaudia karodia
- village
- Location in Madhya Pradesh, India Karaudia (India)
- Coordinates: 23.19°N 75.81°E
- Country: India
- State: Madhya Pradesh
- District: Ujjain
- Elevation: 498 m (1,634 ft)

Population (2011)
  - Total: 5,302

Languages
  - Official: Hindi
- Time zone: UTC+5:30 (IST)
- PIN: 456668
- ISO 3166 code: IN-MP
- Vehicle registration: MP

Karaudia is a village in Ujjain district of Madhya Pradesh, India. According to Census 2011 information the location code or village code of Kadodiya village is 471683. It is situated 40 km (25 mi) away from sub-district headquarters of Tarana and 65 km (40 mi) away from district headquarters Ujjain.

== Demographics ==
The total geographical area of village is 2,461 hectares (9.50 sq mi). Kadodiya has a total population of 5,302 people. There are about 1,143 houses in Karaudia village. As of 2009, the village is also a gram panchayat and is located in Tarana Tehsil. Makdon is the nearest town, which is approximately 8 km (5.0 mi) away.

== History ==
Karaudia or Karodia was Princely State of the British Raj before 1947. The state was ruled by the Chauhan dynasty of Rajputs. the state's clan is bhimawat and subclan is sanchora.

The ruler of the state was referred to as Raja Sahab.
