= Prakash Sonkar =

Indian politician

Minister of Forest and Scheduled Caste Welfare, Madhya Pradesh Government
- In office 2005–2007

Member of Legislative Assembly from Madhya Pradesh
- In office 2003–2008
- Succeeded by: Tulsiram Silawat
- Constituency: Sanwer
- In office 1990–1998
- Succeeded by: Premchand Guddu
- Constituency: Sanwer
- In office 1980–1985
- Succeeded by: Tulsiram Silawat
- Constituency: Sanwer

Personal details
- Born: 15 January 1954 Sanwer, Madhya Bharat, India
- Died: 23 June 2007 (aged 53) Jhabua, Madhya Pradesh, India
- Party: Bharatiya Janata Party

Prakash Sonkar (15 January 1954 – 23 June 2007) was an Indian politician. He was member of the Bharatiya Janata Party. Sonkar was a member of the Madhya Pradesh Legislative Assembly from the Sanwer constituency in Indore district in 1980, 1990 and 2003. He was Minister of State for Forest and Scheduled Caste Welfare in Government of Madhya Pradesh from 2005 to 2007. He died on 23 June 2007.
