= Shivnarayan Jagirdar =

Indian politician

Shivnarayan Jagirdar is an Indian politician and member of the Bharatiya Janata Party. Jagirdar was a member of the Madhya Pradesh Legislative Assembly from the Ujjain Dakshin constituency in Ujjain district. He has also served as a Cabinet Minister in the Government of Madhya Pradesh.
