= Govind Parmar =

Indian politician (1953/1954)

Govind Parmar was an Indian politician of the Bharatiya Janata Party. Parmar was a member of the Madhya Pradesh Legislative Assembly from 1990 to 1993, from the Tarana constituency in Ujjain district.
