= Dinesh Jain Boss =

Indian politician

Dinesh Jain Boss (born 1966) is an Indian politician from Madhya Pradesh. He is a member of the Madhya Pradesh Legislative Assembly from Mahidpur Assembly constituency in Ujjain District. He was elected in the 2023 Madhya Pradesh Legislative Assembly election, representing the Indian National Congress.

== Early life and education ==
Boss is from Mahidpur, Ujjain District, Madhya Pradesh. He is the son of Mangilal Jain. He completed his M.Sc. in technology, in 1987 at School of Studies in Geology, Vikram University, Ujjain. Earlier, he did B.Sc. in 1984 at Madhav Science College, Ujjain, which is affiliated with Vikram University.

== Career ==
Boss won from Mahidpur Assembly constituency representing Indian National Congress in the 2023 Madhya Pradesh Legislative Assembly election. He polled 75,454 votes and defeated his nearest rival, Bahadur Singh Chouhan of the Bharatiya Janata Party, by a narrow margin of 290 votes. Earlier, he lost both the 2018 and 2013 elections. In the 2018 Madhya Pradesh Legislative Assembly elections he lost to Bahadur Singh Chouhan of the BJP by a margin of 15,220 votes and in the 2013 Madhya Pradesh Legislative Assembly election too, he contested as an independent candidate and lost to the same BJP candidate Chouhan, by a margin of 20,634 votes.
