= Radhelal Vyas =

Member of Parliament, Lok Sabha
- In office 1952-1967
- Succeeded by: Hukam Chand Kachwai
- Constituency: Ujjain, Madhya Pradesh

Personal details
- Born: 23 August 1909 Shajapur, Gwalior State, British India (now Madhya Pradesh, India)
- Died: 13/01/1967 Indore, Madhya Pradesh
- Party: Indian National Congress
- Spouse: Late Gitabai Vyas
- Children: 8

Radhelal Vyas (1909-1967) was an Indian freedom-fighter, Gandhian and Parliamentarian from Ujjain, Malwa, Madhya Pradesh. He was one of the first freedom fighter who faced internment and externment for his socio-political activities in the erstwhile Gwalior State. In the pre-independence era, he was associated with Gwalior State Sarvajanik Sabha (later State Congress) and led its operations in the Ujjain and Khachrod Area of State.

In 1942, he was sent to Mungawali Jail for participating in quit India movement. When the Provincial Government for Central Provinces was formed in 1948, he was chosen as the minister for Revenue, Food and Agriculture, Jagirs department. He successfully negotiated with Maharaja of Gwalior over estates and Jagirs. He also served at various posts of Ujjain and Gwalior State Congress Committee. He represented Ujjain seat of Gwalior state in the lower house of parliament before 1952. In 1952, through first general elections, he was elected to the lower House of Parliament, the Lok Sabha, from Ujjain, Gwalior state, Madhya Bharat, India as a member of the Indian National Congress. He went on to win two more consecutive elections to Lok Sabha from Ujjain, Madhya Pradesh in the 1957 and 1962 elections. In 1966, Ujjain was declared SC reserved seat for Lok Sabha and he was given ticket by INC to contest from Shajapur. On 13 January 1967, right before his fourth election, he died of blood cancer in Indore. Late Radhelal Vyas served on many important committees of Loksabha namely SEBI committee, UGC committee, Estimates committee along with many others. He was chairman of the Nahan Foundry Enquiry Commission.

== Early life ==
Vyas was brought up in humble upbringings, in small village near Shajapur. Having lost his father at an early age of 11 years, raised by his mother and maternal uncle in Shajapur facing acute shortage and poverty, he worked his way up by studying law at Victoria College, Gwalior.

He had a successful law practice in Khachrod tehsil of Ujjain district which he abandoned after drawing inspiration from Sardar Patel and Mahatma Gandhi, leaving behind his wife and small children who often faced British officers coming for interrogation to their house. During the Quit India movement, he moved his base to Daulatganj, Ujjain and subsequently to Brahmin Gali, Ujjain. In 1948, Mahatma Gandhi's ashes were flown into Ujjain's Holy River Kshipra by him. After his death in 1966, Congress Party didn't have a leader who had serial victories from Ujjain to Loksabha and Ujjain became a solid bastion of BJP.
