= Madhav Prasad Shastri =

Indian politician

Dr. Madhav Prasad Shastri is an Indian politician and member of the Bharatiya Janata Party. Shastri was a member of the Madhya Pradesh Legislative Assembly from 1993 to 1998, from the Tarana constituency in Ujjain district.
