= Nagjhiri =

- मध्य प्रदेश में स्थिति
- Coordinates: 23.334°N 75.475°E
- Country: India
- State: Madhya Pradesh
- District: Ujjain district
- Tehsil: Nagda

Population (2011)
  - Total: 1,385

Languages
  - Official: Hindi
- Time zone: UTC+5:30 (IST)

Nagjhiri is a village near Ujjain, India. It is located in the state of Madhya Pradesh and the district Ujjain.

== See also ==
- Ujjain
