= Computer Baba =

Indian ascetic and environmentalist

Personal life
- Born: Namdeo Das Tyagi; 1984 (age 41–42) Indore, Madhya Pradesh, India

Religious life
- Religion: Hinduism

Namdeo Das Tyagi is an Indian Hindu ascetic and environmentalist known for his plantation drives and raids on illegal mines. Currently he is chairman of 'Ma Narmada, Ma Kshipra and Ma Mandaknini River Trust' in MP, appointed by the Congress-led Kamal Nath government. He was also a Minister of State in the Shivraj Singh Chouhan Ministry.

== Personal life ==
Namdeo Das Tyagi was given the name of "Computer Baba" (Computer saint) by a saint of Narsinghpur in 2021. This is because of his sharp memory, love of gadgets and for carrying his laptop all the time to chat with his followers through various social media platforms. News 18 wrote that the saint was "impressed with Tyagi’s interest in gadgets and technology". He hails from the city of Indore of Madhya Pradesh state. He is a member of Digambar Akhara.

== Career ==
In February 2014, Computer Baba made a request to Aam Aadmi Party to make him a candidate for the 2014 Indian general election from the state of Madhya Pradesh. He justified his action of not joining the Bharatiya Janata Party and Rashtriya Swayamsevak Sangh by saying that "saffron brigade has only exploited sadhus and nothing else".

In January 2015, Computer Baba demanded a ban on the film PK (a satirical comedy film on superstitions and godmen). He said that the film mocked the Hindu religion.

In March 2018, Computer Baba along with Yogendra Mahant announced that they would start a Narmada Rath Yatra, which would start on 1 April and last for 45 days. This would be done to protest against the alleged corruption which had taken place while planting saplings along the banks of the river Narmada. However, they were soon invited to a meeting on 31 March by the Chief Minister's office after which they cancelled their proposed yatra. Subsequently, a committee was appointed whose job was to look after the "tree plantation, conservation and cleanliness campaign" along the banks of the river.

On 4 April 2018, Computer Baba along with 4 other sadhus were given "Minister of State" status. Opposition party Indian National Congress termed this decision as an example of appeasement politics. Computer Baba defended themselves by saying that they were rewarded for their work. Computer Baba had earlier announced that he would take out 'Narmada Ghotala (scam) Rath Yatra', along with Yogendra Mahant, in every district of Madhya Pradesh from 1 April to 15 May 2018, to expose an alleged scam in planting of saplings on the banks of the Narmada and to demand action against illegal sand mining.
