= Babu Lal Mahere =

Indian politician

Babu Lal Mahere is an Indian politician and member of the Bharatiya Janata Party. Mahere is a member of the Madhya Pradesh Legislative Assembly from the Ujjain Dakshin constituency in Ujjain district.
