= Rodmal Rathore =

Indian politician

Rodmal Rathore is an Indian politician and member of the Bharatiya Janata Party. Rathore is a member of the Madhya Pradesh Legislative Assembly from the Tarana constituency in Ujjain district.
