= Government Madhav Arts and Commerce College, Ujjain =

College in Madhya Pradesh

- Other names: Madhav College
- Type: State Government Supported
- Established: 1890
- Affiliations: UGC, Vikram University
- Principal: J.L Barmaiya
- Academic staff: 65
- Location: Ujjain, Madhya Pradesh, India; 23.207°N 75.776°E
- Campus: Urban
- Website: www.mphighereducation.nic.in/madhavcollege

Government Madhav Arts and Commerce College, Ujjain, also known by the shorter names as Government Madhav College, Ujjain or Madhav College, is a government college located in Ujjain, Madhya Pradesh, India. It is recognized by the University Grants Commission (UGC) and affiliated to Vikram University.

== Notable alumni ==
- Anil Firojiya, Indian politician and Member of Parliament in the 17th Lok Sabha
