= Mahesh Parmar =

Indian politician

Member of the Madhya Pradesh Legislative Assembly
- Incumbent
- Assumed office 11 December 2018
- Preceded by: Anil Firojiya
- Constituency: Tarana

Personal details
- Parent: Mangilalji Parmar (father)
- Education: Post-graduate (MA, LLB, BA)
- Alma mater: Vikram University, Ujjain
- Profession: Agriculture, Warehousing, Legislator's salary

Mahesh Parmar is an Indian politician and member of the Indian National Congress. He is a member of Madhya Pradesh Legislative Assembly, elected twice from Tarana (SC) in 2018 and 2023.

He has been a critic of the claims of development under the "double-engine government" plank of the Bharatiya Janata Party and has protested by taking a public vow dipping into the heavily polluted Shipra river, using it as an example of the lack of development and vowing to clean it up if elected.
