= Liladhar Joshi =

Indian politician

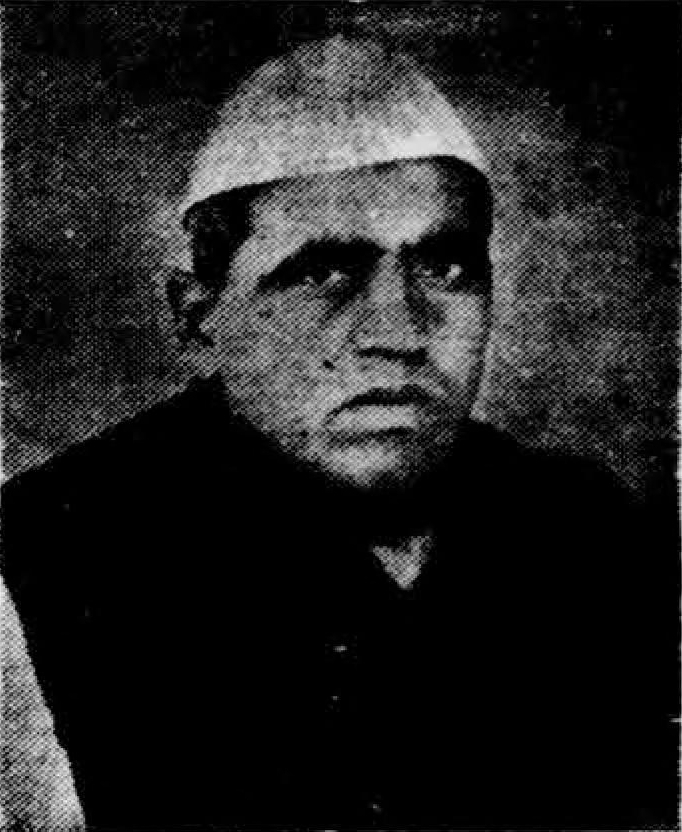
- Liladhar Joshi

Member of Parliament, Lok Sabha
- In office 1952–1962
- Constituency: Shajapur, Madhya Pradesh

Personal details
- Born: 14 November 1907 Shujalpur, Central Provinces and Berar, British India
- Died: 15th April 1995
- Party: Indian National Congress
- Spouse: Janakibai
- Children: Lt Shridhar Joshi and Lt Vidyadhar Joshi

Liladhar Joshi was an Indian politician. He was elected to the Lok Sabha, the lower house of the Parliament of India as a member of the Indian National Congress. He was the First Chief Minister of Madhya Bharat.
