= Jitendra Pandya =

MLA from Madhya Pradesh, India

Jitendra Uday Singh Pandya (born 1976) is an Indian politician from Madhya Pradesh. He is an MLA from Badnagar Assembly constituency in Ujjain District. He won the 2023 Madhya Pradesh Legislative Assembly election, representing the Bharatiya Janata Party.

== Early life and education ==
Pandya is from Barnagar, Ujjain District, Madhya Pradesh. He is the son of three-time MLA, Uday Singh Pandya. He passed Class 12 in 1996 at Government Boys’ Higher Secondary School, Barnagar and later discontinued his studies.

== Career ==
Pandya won from Badnagar Assembly constituency representing Bharatiya Janata Party in the 2023 Madhya Pradesh Legislative Assembly election. He polled 80,728 votes and defeated his nearest rival, Murli Morwal of the Indian National Congress, by a margin of 36,693 votes.
