= Shiva Kotwani =

Indian politician

Shiva Kotwani was an Indian politician and member of the Bharatiya Janata Party.

Served as a member of the Madhya Pradesh Legislative Assembly from 1993 to 1998 for the Ujjain Dakshin constituency.

He died on 16 April 2021, from COVID-19, aged 68.
