= Chintamani Malviya =

Indian politician

Member of the Madhya Pradesh Legislative Assembly
- Incumbent
- Assumed office 8 December 2023
- Preceded by: Manoj Chawla
- Constituency: Alot

Member of Parliament, Lok Sabha
- In office 2014–2019
- Preceded by: Premchand Guddu
- Succeeded by: Anil Firojiya
- Constituency: Ujjain

Personal details
- Born: 8 January 1969 (age 57) Ujjain, Madhya Pradesh, India
- Party: Bharatiya Janata Party
- Spouse: Rashmi Malviya (m. 1993)
- Children: 3 sons, 1 daughter
- Parents: Jamuna Lal Malviya (father); Sona Bai Malviya (mother)
- Education: M.A., M.Phil., Ph.D
- Alma mater: Vikram University
- Occupation: Professor, Social worker, Businessperson

Chintamani Malviya (Hindi pronunciation: [t͡ʃɪn̪t̪aːməɳɪ maːlʋiːj(ə)]) is a member of the Bharatiya Janata Party and won the 2014 Indian general elections from the Ujjain Lok Sabha constituency.
