= Mahendra Solanki =

Politician from Madhya Pradesh, India

Mahendra Singh Solanki

Member of Parliament, Lok Sabha
- Incumbent
- Assumed office 23 May 2019
- Constituency: Dewas
- Preceded by: Manohar Untwal

Personal details
- Born: 11 April 1984 (age 42) Indore, Madhya Pradesh, India
- Party: Bharatiya Janata Party
- Spouse: Priti Mishra Solanki
- Children: 2 Sons
- Parent(s): Ram Singh Solanki, Sarju Bai
- Education: BA, LLB
- Alma mater: Indore Institute of Law
- Website: www.mahendrasolanki.com

Mahendra Singh Solanki (born 11 April 1984; Hindi pronunciation: [məɦeːn̪d̪ɾə sɪŋgʱ soːlə̃ŋkiː]) is an Indian parliament politician. He was elected to the Lok Sabha, lower house of the Parliament of India from Dewas, Madhya Pradesh in the 2019 Indian general election as member of the Bharatiya Janata Party.

Previously he has worked as a judge in court.

Lok Sabha
Preceded by Manohar Untwal	Member of Lok Sabha for Dewas; 2019–	Incumbent
