= Shajapur Lok Sabha constituency =

Former constituency of the Indian parliament in Madhya Pradesh

Coordinates: 23.50°N 76.25°E

Shajapur
- Former Lok Sabha constituency

Constituency details
- Country: India
- Region: Central India
- State: Madhya Pradesh
- Assembly constituencies: Shujalpur (166); Gulana (167); Shajapur (168); Agar (169); Susner (170); Dewas (186); Sonkatch (187); Hatpipliya (188)
- Established: 1977
- Abolished: 2009
- Reservation: SC

Shajapur Lok Sabha constituency was a Lok Sabha constituency in Madhya Pradesh state in central India. This constituency was reserved for the candidates belonging to the Scheduled Castes from 1976 to 2008. This constituency covered the entire Shajapur district and part of Dewas district.

== Vidhan Sabha segments ==
From 1976 to 2008, Shajapur Lok Sabha constituency comprised the following eight Vidhan Sabha (Legislative Assembly) segments:

Constituency number	Name	Reserved for (SC/ST/None)	District	Number of electorates (2003)
166	Shujalpur	None	Shajapur	177,272
167	Gulana	None	Shajapur	149,307
168	Shajapur	None	Shajapur	181,088
169	Agar	SC	Shajapur	160,102
170	Susner	None	Shajapur	145,332
186	Dewas	None	Dewas	214,981
187	Sonkatch	SC	Dewas	142,073
188	Hatpipalya	None	Dewas	146,729
Total:				1,316,884

Agar, Shajapur, Shujalpur, Dewas, Sonkatch and Hatpipalya Vidhan Sabha segments are currently part of Dewas Lok Sabha constituency. Susner is part of Rajgarh constituency and Gulana was abolished in 2008.

== Members of Parliament ==
Year	Details	Member/s	Photo	Party
1951	2-member seat for Madhya Bharat state: (as Shajapur Rajgarh)	Liladhar Joshi and Bhagu Nandu Malvia		Indian National Congress
1957	2-member seat for Madhya Pradesh	Liladhar Joshi and Kanahiyalal Malvia		Indian National Congress
1962-1967	Seat did not exist			
1967	1-member seat	Baburao Patel		Bharatiya Jana Sangh
1971	1-member seat	Jagannathrao Joshi		Bharatiya Jana Sangh
1977	SC-reserved seat	Phool Chand Verma		Janata Party (Joined BJP in April 1980)
1980	SC-reserved seat	Phool Chand Verma		Janata Party (Joined BJP in April 1980)
1984	SC-reserved seat	Bapulal Malviya		Indian National Congress
1989	SC-reserved seat	Phool Chand Verma		Bharatiya Janata Party
1991	SC-reserved seat	Phool Chand Verma		Bharatiya Janata Party
1996	SC-reserved seat	Thawarchand Gehlot		Bharatiya Janata Party
1998	SC-reserved seat	Thawarchand Gehlot		Bharatiya Janata Party
1999	SC-reserved seat	Thawarchand Gehlot		Bharatiya Janata Party
2004	SC-reserved seat	Thawarchand Gehlot		Bharatiya Janata Party
After 2008		Seat ceased to exist		

The constituency ceased to exist when Lok Sabha seats map for Madhya Pradesh was redrawn in 2008.

== See also ==
- Dewas Lok Sabha constituency
- Shajapur district
- List of constituencies of the Lok Sabha
