= Anil Firojiya =

Indian politician (born 1971)

Member of Parliament, Lok Sabha
- Incumbent
- Assumed office 23 May 2019
- Preceded by: Chintamani Malviya
- Constituency: Ujjain

Personal details
- Born: 14 July 1971 (age 54) Ujjain, Madhya Pradesh, India
- Party: Bharatiya Janata Party
- Profession: Politician

Anil Firojiya (born 14 July 1971; Hindi pronunciation: [ən̪ɪl fɪɾoːzɪjaː] also [pʰɪɾoːd͡ʒɪjaː]) is an Indian politician serving as the Member of Parliament in the 17th Lok Sabha from Ujjain. He was elected in the 2019 Indian general election as member of the Bharatiya Janata Party. Firojiya was member of the Madhya Pradesh Legislative Assembly from the Tarana constituency in Ujjain district from 2013 to 2018.

== Personal life ==
Firojiya was born on 14 July 1971 to Bhurelal Firojiya and Javetri Firojiya in Ujjain in Madhya Pradesh. He is a Bachelor of Commerce graduate from Government Madhav Arts and Commerce College, Ujjain. Firojiya is married to Sandhya Firojiya, with whom he has two daughters.

== Political career ==
Firojiya was the Madhya Pradesh Legislative Assembly member from the Tarana from 2013 to 2018.

In 2019, he was elected as the Member of Parliament from Ujjain. From 24 July 2019 onwards, he is a member of the Committee on Welfare of the Scheduled Castes and Scheduled Tribes. He is also a member of the Standing Committee on Food, Consumer Affairs and Public Distribution and the Consultative Committee, Ministry of External Affairs since 13 September 2019.
