= Thawar Chand Gehlot =

Governor of Karnataka (born 1948)

Thaawar Chand Gehlot
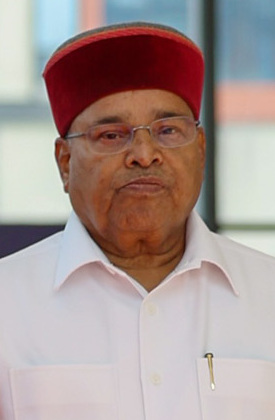
- Gehlot in 2024

Governor of Karnataka
- In office 11 July 2021 – 16 October 2026
- Chief Minister: B. S. Yediyurappa; Basavaraj Bommai; Siddaramaiah; D. K. Shivakumar
- Preceded by: Vajubhai Vala
- Succeeded by: Sudha Yadav

Union Minister of Social Justice and Empowerment
- In office 26 May 2014 – 7 July 2021
- Prime Minister: Narendra Modi
- Preceded by: Mallikarjun Kharge
- Succeeded by: Virendra Kumar Khatik

27th Leader of the House in Rajya Sabha
- In office 11 June 2019 – 6 July 2021
- Chairman: Venkaiah Naidu
- Preceded by: Arun Jaitley
- Succeeded by: Piyush Goyal

Member of Parliament, Rajya Sabha
- In office 3 April 2012 – 7 July 2021
- Succeeded by: L. Murugan
- Constituency: Madhya Pradesh

Member of Parliament, Lok Sabha
- In office 12 May 1996 – 16 May 2009
- Preceded by: Phool Chand Verma
- Succeeded by: Constituency abolished
- Constituency: Shajapur, Madhya Pradesh

Personal details
- Born: 18 May 1948 (age 78) Rupeta, Central India Agency, Dominion of India (present-day Madhya Pradesh, India)
- Party: Bharatiya Janata Party
- Other political affiliations: National Democratic Alliance
- Spouse: Anita Gehlot (m. 1965)
- Children: 4
- Education: Vikram University

Thawar Chand Gehlot (born 18 May 1948) is an Indian politician who is the former Governor of Karnataka, being the first person serving as the Governor of Karnataka from Madhya Pradesh. He assumed office of the Governor of Karnataka on 11 July 2021 and his last working day is 13.10.2026 as the President of India has appointed Dr. Sudha Yadav as the New Governor of Karnataka. He also served as the Minister of Social Justice and Empowerment in the Government of India from 2014 to 2021. He was also the Leader of the House in the upper house of Indian Parliament. He was a member of the Parliamentary Board and the Central Election Committee of the BJP.

== Early life ==
Gehlot was born in a Dalit family in the village of Rupeta in Nagda in the Central India Agency of the Dominion of India, which is in present-day Madhya Pradesh, India. His family migrated from Rupeta to Nagda when factories of Grasim Industries were set up in Nagda. He worked hard in his early life and was specially keen to many sports such as kabaddi and hockey.

He is a senior member of Bharatiya Janata Party. He had assumed ministerial berth a number of times in the union government.

He completed his Bachelor of Arts degree from Vikram University, Ujjain, Madhya Pradesh.

== Career ==
In 1980 he participated in the Vidhan Sabha election from Alote.

He was a member of the Rajya Sabha, upper house of Indian Parliament representing the state of Madhya Pradesh. He was awarded an honorary doctorate by the Dr. B.R. Ambedkar University of Social Sciences. He formerly represented Shajapur in the lower house of Indian Parliament, Lok Sabha from 1996 to 2009. He served as the Union Minister for Social Justice and Empowerment, in Modi's 2nd cabinet. He is a member of the Bharatiya Janata Party (BJP) and was also the general secretary of the party.

== Governor ==
On 6 July 2021, Thawar Chand Gehlot was appointed the 13th Governor of Karnataka.

Following the 2023 Karnataka Legislative Assembly election, Gehlot invited Siddaramaiah to form the government after the Indian National Congress secured a majority in the Assembly. On 20 May 2023, he administered the oath of office to Siddaramaiah as Chief Minister and to the members of the Council of Ministers.

In August 2024, Gehlot granted sanction for the prosecution of Chief Minister Siddaramaiah under the Prevention of Corruption Act, 1988 in connection with the alleged Mysore Urban Development Authority land allotment case (MUDA case), following petitions filed by activists. The decision was challenged by Siddaramaiah, who alleged that the sanction was politically motivated and legally untenable. The Karnataka High Court upheld the Governor's sanction, allowing the investigation to proceed, while the matter also became the subject of further judicial proceedings. The Governor's decision drew significant political attention and sparked debate over the discretionary powers of Governors in granting prosecution sanction against sitting Chief Ministers.

In January 2026, Gehlot declined to read certain portions of the Governor's Address prepared by the Karnataka government during the Budget Session of the Karnataka Legislature, stating that they were inconsistent with constitutional conventions. He read only the opening and concluding portions of the address before leaving the Assembly. The incident triggered a political controversy, following which Gehlot submitted a report on the proceedings to the President of India.

In July 2026, Gehlot suspended Karnataka Public Service Commission (KPSC) Chairman Shivashankarappa S. Sahukar following allegations that he had facilitated the unlawful selection of his two daughters for government posts and failed to disclose a conflict of interest. Invoking his powers under Article 317 of the Constitution, Gehlot also recommended that the President of India refer the matter to the Supreme Court for an inquiry into the allegations. Pending the inquiry, the senior-most member of the Commission was directed to discharge the functions of the KPSC Chairman.

Lok Sabha
Preceded by Phool Chand Verma	Member of Parliament for Shajapur; 1996–2009	Succeeded by Constituency dissolved
Political offices
Preceded by Selja Kumari	Minister of Social Justice and Empowerment; 26 May 2014 - 8 July 2021	Succeeded by Virendra Kumar Khatik
Preceded by Arun Jaitley	Leader of the House of the Rajya Sabha; 11 June 2019 - 6 July 2021	Succeeded by Piyush Goyal
