= Jharda =

Town in Madhya Pradesh, India

- Town
- Location in Madhya Pradesh, India
- Coordinates: 23.60°N 75.72°E
- Country: India
- State: Madhya Pradesh
- District: Ujjain District

Languages
  - Official: Hindi
- PIN: 456441
- Vehicle registration: MP 13

Jharda is a town and a Tehsil Headquarter in Ujjain District of Madhya Pradesh. Jharda's PIN is 456441.

Jharda is located on 23.60°N 75.72°E. It has an average elevation of 490 m (1,610 ft). It is 65 km away from the district headquarters.

As per Census of India 2011, Jharda village has a population of 6,777 of which 3,415 are males and 3,362 are females.

Jharda is well connected with roads. It is 65 km away from Ujjain, 115 km away from Indore and 55 km away from Nagda. Daily bus service connected it to nearby major cities.

== See also ==
- Mahidpur
- Ujjain District
