= Sonkatch Assembly constituency =

Constituency of the Madhya Pradesh legislative assembly in India

Coordinates: 22.97°N 76.34°E

Sonkatch
- Constituency No. 170 for the Madhya Pradesh Legislative Assembly

Constituency details
- Country: India
- Region: Central India
- State: Madhya Pradesh
- District: Dewas
- Lok Sabha constituency: Dewas
- Established: 1957
- Reservation: SC

Member of Legislative Assembly
- 16th Madhya Pradesh Legislative Assembly
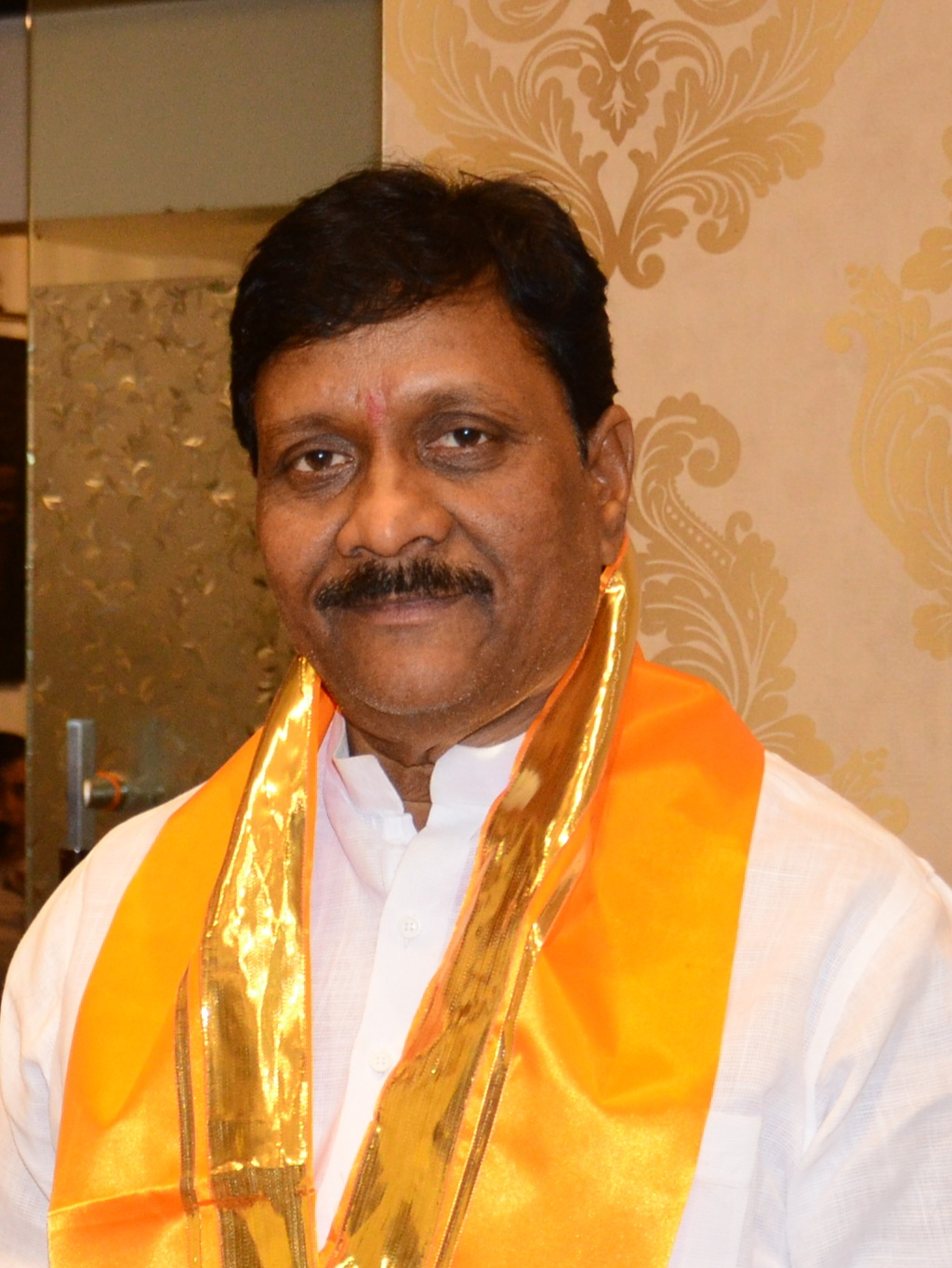
- Incumbent Rajesh Sonkar
- Party: Bharatiya Janta Party
- Elected year: 2023
- Preceded by: Sajjan Singh Verma

Sonkatch is one of the 230 Vidhan Sabha (Legislative Assembly) constituencies of Madhya Pradesh state in central India.

It is in Dewas district, and is a segment of the Dewas Lok Sabha constituency.

== Members of the Legislative Assembly ==
=== Madhya Bharat Legislative Assembly ===
Election	Name	Party
1952	Vijaysingh Hira Singh	Indian National Congress

=== Madhya Pradesh Legislative Assembly ===
Election	Name	Party
1957	Bhagirathsingh Puransingh	Bharatiya Jana Sangh
1962	Bhagirathsingh Puransingh	Bharatiya Jana Sangh
1964^	V. Singh	Bharatiya Jana Sangh
1967	Khoobchand	Bharatiya Jana Sangh
1972	Bapulal Malviya	Indian National Congress
1977	Devilal Raikwal Bulchand	Janata Party
1980	Bapulal Malviya	Indian National Congress (Indira)
1985	Sajjan Singh Verma	Indian National Congress
1990	Kailash	Bharatiya Janata Party
1993	Surender Verma	Bharatiya Janata Party
1998	Sajjan Singh Verma	Indian National Congress
2003	Sajjan Singh Verma	Indian National Congress
2008	Sajjan Singh Verma	Indian National Congress
2013	Rajendra Phulchand Verma	Bharatiya Janata Party
2018	Sajjan Singh Verma	Indian National Congress
2023	Rajesh Sonkar	Bharatiya Janata Party

^ bypoll

== Election results ==
=== 2023 ===
2023 Madhya Pradesh Legislative Assembly election: Sonkatch
Party	Candidate	Votes	%	±%
BJP	Rajesh Sonkar	108,869	54.21	+10.85
INC	Sajjan Singh Verma	83,432	41.54	−7.38
ASP(KR)	Kailash Kaleshria	3,401	1.69	
BSP	Babulal Chouhan	1,914	0.95	−1.12
NOTA	None of the above	1,262	0.63	−0.49
Majority		25,437	12.67	+7.11
Turnout		200,837	85.73	+1.81
BJP gain from INC		Swing		

=== 2018 ===
2018 Madhya Pradesh Legislative Assembly election: Sonkatch
Party	Candidate	Votes	%	±%
INC	Sajjan Singh Verma	86,396	48.92	
BJP	Rajendra Phulchand Verma	76,578	43.36	
BSP	Babulal Chouhan	3,657	2.07	
Independent	Dharmraj Pradhan	2,263	1.28	
NOTA	None of the above	1,975	1.12	
Majority		9,818	5.56	
Turnout		176,594	83.92	
INC gain from		Swing		
