= Satyanarayan Jatiya =

Indian politician

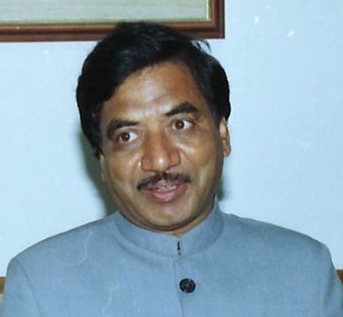

Minister of Labour and Employment
- In office 22 November 1999 – 1 September 2001
- Prime Minister: Atal Bihari Vajpayee
- Succeeded by: Sharad Yadav

Minister of Social Justice and Empowerment
- In office 1 September 2001 – 22 May 2004
- Prime Minister: Atal Bihari Vajpayee

Member of Parliament, Rajya Sabha
- In office 10 April 2014 – 9 April 2020
- Succeeded by: Jyotiraditya Scindia
- Constituency: Madhya Pradesh

Member of Parliament, Lok Sabha
- In office 18 January 1980 – 29 December 1984
- Preceded by: Hukam Chand Kachwai
- Succeeded by: Satya Narayan Pawar
- In office 29 November 1989 – 17 May 2009
- Preceded by: Satya Narayan Pawar
- Succeeded by: Premchand Guddu
- Constituency: Ujjain

President, Bharatiya Janata Party - Madhya Pradesh
- In office 17 February 2006 – 20 November 2006
- Preceded by: Shivraj Singh Chouhan
- Succeeded by: Narendra Singh Tomar

Personal details
- Born: 4 February 1946 (age 80) Jawad, Gwalior State, British India
- Party: BJP
- Spouse: Kalawati Jatiya
- Children: 2 sons and 3 daughters
- Education: B.Sc., M.A., LL.B., Ph.D.
- As of 22 September, 2006

Satyanarayan Jatiya (born 4 February 1946) is an Indian politician. He was elected to the Lok Sabha seven times from Ujjain as a member of Bharatiya Janata Party, and served one term (2014–2020) in Rajya Sabha. He was cabinet minister in Vajpayee's government from 1999 to 2004 and held portfolios of labour and social justice and empowerment. Currently, he is member of BJP Parliamentary Board.

== Early life ==
Born in Jawad of Neemuch district in Madhya Pradesh in 1946 he studied B.Sc., MA, LL.B., Ph.D. at Vikram University, Ujjain. He entered politics in 1972 and was detained under MISA during emergency. He was elected to Madhya Pradesh Legislative Assembly in 1977. He was later elected to 7th (1980), 9th (1989), 10th, 11th, 12th, 13th and 14th (2004–2009) Lok Sabha from Ujjain.

He is also a poet and a collection of his poems, Alakh, was published in 1995.

== Political career ==
Jatiya entered active politics in 1972 and was detained under the Maintenance of Internal Security Act (MISA) during the Emergency (1975–77). He was first elected to the Madhya Pradesh Legislative Assembly in 1977.

He subsequently represented the Ujjain constituency in the Lok Sabha, being elected to the 7th (1980), 9th (1989), 10th, 11th, 12th, 13th, and 14th (2004–2009) Lok Sabha.

From 1 September 2001 to 22 May 2004, he served as the Minister of Social Justice and Empowerment in the Government of India under Atal Bihari Vajpayee’s prime ministership. During his tenure, he focused on policies related to the upliftment of marginalized communities and social welfare reforms.

== Positions held ==
Satyanarayan Jatiya has been elected seven times as a MP in the Lok Sabha, once as a MLA from Madhya Pradesh, and has also served as a Rajya Sabha MP.

#	From	To	Position	Party
1	1977	1980	MLA from Agar, Madhya Pradesh	Janata Party
2	1980	1984	MP (1st term) in 7th Lok Sabha from Ujjain	Bharatiya Janata Party
3	1989	1991	MP (2nd term) in 9th Lok Sabha from Ujjain	Bharatiya Janata Party
4	1991	1996	MP (3rd term) in 10th Lok Sabha from Ujjain	Bharatiya Janata Party
5	1996	1998	MP (4th term) in 11th Lok Sabha from Ujjain	Bharatiya Janata Party
6	1998	1999	MP (5th term) in 12th Lok Sabha from Ujjain	Bharatiya Janata Party
7	1999	2004	MP (6th term) in 13th Lok Sabha from Ujjain	Bharatiya Janata Party
8	2004	2009	MP (7th term) in 14th Lok Sabha from Ujjain	Bharatiya Janata Party
9	1 September 2001	22 May 2004	Cabinet Minister in the Government of India under Atal Bihari Vajpayee	Bharatiya Janata Party
10	2014	2020	Rajya Sabha MP from Madhya Pradesh	Bharatiya Janata Party
