= Bapulal Malviya =

Indian politician (1929–2000)

Member of Parliament, Lok Sabha
- In office 1984–1989
- Preceded by: Phool Chand Verma
- Succeeded by: Phool Chand Verma
- Constituency: Shajapur, Madhya Pradesh

Personal details
- Born: 17 February 1929
- Died: 29 February 2000 (aged 71)
- Party: Indian National Congress
- Spouse: Subhadra Devi Malviva

Bapulal Malviya (17 February 1929 – 29 February 2000) was an Indian politician. He was elected to the Lok Sabha, the lower house of the Parliament of India as a member of the Indian National Congress. Malviya died on 29 February 2000, at the age of 71.
