= Makdone =

Town in Madhya Pradesh, India

Mekdone
- City
- Location in Madhya Pradesh, India
- Coordinates: 23.60°N 76.07°E
- Country: India
- State: Madhya Pradesh
- District: Ujjain

Population (2011)
  - Total: 11,678

Languages
  - Official: Hindi
- Time zone: UTC+5:30 (IST)
- PIN: 456668
- Vehicle registration: MP 13

Mekdone is a town and Nagar Parishad in Ujjain District of Madhya Pradesh in India. It's a Tehsil Headquarter.

== Geography ==
Makdone sits at an elevation of 485 metres (1591 feet).

Makdone is located in Malwa region. The region is predominantly agrarian. Makdone is located on 60 km away from Ujjain, it's pin code is 456668. Last Patel of Makdone in British Rule Shri Badri patel

== Demographics ==
As per Census of India 2011Makdon Town has population of 11,678 of which 5,936 are males while 5,742 are females.

=== Languages ===
Mainly Hindi and Malwi languages are spoken here.

== Civil Administration ==
Makdon town has total administration over 2,388 houses to which it supplies basic amenities like water and sewerage. It is also authorize to build roads within Nagar Panchayat limits and impose taxes on properties coming under its jurisdiction.
