= Ujjain North Assembly constituency =

Legislative Assembly constituency in Madhya Pradesh, India

Coordinates: 23.17°N 75.79°E

Ujjain Uttar
- Constituency No. 216 for the Madhya Pradesh Legislative Assembly

Constituency details
- Country: India
- Region: Central India
- State: Madhya Pradesh
- District: Ujjain
- Lok Sabha constituency: Ujjain
- Established: 1957
- Reservation: None

Member of Legislative Assembly
- 16th Madhya Pradesh Legislative Assembly
- Incumbent Anil Jain Kaluheda
- Party: Bharatiya Janata Party
- Elected year: 2023
- Preceded by: Paras Chandra Jain

Ujjain North Assembly constituency is one of the 230 Vidhan Sabha (Legislative Assembly) constituencies of Madhya Pradesh state in central India. This constituency came into existence in 1951, as one of the 79 Vidhan Sabha constituencies of the erstwhile Madhya Bharat state.

== Overview ==
Ujjain North (constituency number 216) is one of the 7 Vidhan Sabha constituencies located in Ujjain district. This constituency covers the ward numbers 1 to 32, 34 and to 35 of the Ujjain Municipal Corporation. Ujjain Uttar is part of Ujjain (Lok Sabha constituency) along with seven other Vidhan Sabha segments covers the entire Ujjain district and part of Ratlam district.

== Members of Legislative Assembly ==
Year	Name	Party
1957	Rajdan Kumar Kishori	Indian National Congress
1962	Abdul Gayyur Qureshi	Indian National Congress
1967	M. Joshi	Bharatiya Jana Sangh
1972	Prakash Chandra Sethi	Indian National Congress
1977	Babulal Jain	Janata Party
1980	Rajender Jain	Indian National Congress (I)
1985	Batuk Shanker Joshi	Indian National Congress
1990	Paras Chandra Jain	Bharatiya Janata Party
1993	Paras Chandra Jain	Bharatiya Janata Party
1998	Rajendra Bharti	Indian National Congress
2003	Paras Chandra Jain	Bharatiya Janata Party
2008	Paras Chandra Jain	Bharatiya Janata Party
2013	Paras Chandra Jain	Bharatiya Janata Party
2018	Paras Chandra Jain	Bharatiya Janata Party
2023	Anil Jain Kaluheda	Bharatiya Janata Party

== Election results ==
=== 2023 ===
2023 Madhya Pradesh Legislative Assembly election: Ujjain North
Party	Candidate	Votes	%	±%
BJP	Anil Jain Kaluheda	93,535	57.71	+5.22
INC	Maya Rajesh Trivedi	66,022	40.74	+5.72
NOTA	None of the above	1,194	0.74	−0.24
Majority		27,513	16.97	−0.5
Turnout		162,071	71.37	+3.84
BJP hold		Swing		

=== 2018 ===
2018 Madhya Pradesh Legislative Assembly election: Ujjain North
Party	Candidate	Votes	%	±%
BJP	Paras Chandra Jain	77,271	52.49	
INC	Mhanat Rajendra Bharti	51,547	35.02	
Independent	Maya Rajesh Trivedi	13,072	8.88	
Sapaks Party	Jiyalal Sharma	1,655	1.12	
NOTA	None of the above	1,446	0.98	
Majority		25,724	17.47	
Turnout		147,207	67.53	
BJP hold		Swing		

== See also ==
- Ujjain
- Ujjain (Lok Sabha constituency)
