= Jagoti =

- Gram panchayat
- Location in Madhya Pradesh
- Coordinates: 23.400°N 75.805°E
- Country: India
- State: Madhya Pradesh
- District: Ujjain
- Tehsil: Mahidpur

Languages
  - Official: Hindi
- Time zone: UTC+5:30 (IST)
- PIN: 456???
- Telephone code: 07??
- Climate: Cfa (Köppen)
- Precipitation: 900 millimetres (35 in)
- Avg. annual temperature: 24.0 °C (75.2 °F)
- Avg. summer temperature: 31 °C (88 °F)
- Avg. winter temperature: 17 °C (63 °F)

Jagoti is a Gram panchayat in Mahidpur tehsil in Ujjain district in the Indian state of Madhya Pradesh. Jagoti is about 30 kilometres (19 mi) from the city of Ujjain.

== Geography ==
Jagoti is located at 23°24′7″N 75°48′20″E.
