= Tulsi Ram Silawat =

Indian politician (born 1954)

Tulsiram Silawat

Cabinet Minister of Water Resources Madhya Pradesh Government
- Incumbent
- Assumed office 21 April 2020
- Chief Minister: Shivraj Singh Chouhan; Mohan Yadav
- Preceded by: Karada Hukum Singh

Member of the Madhya Pradesh Legislative Assembly
- Incumbent
- Assumed office December 2018
- Preceded by: Rajesh Sonkar
- Constituency: Sanwer
- In office 2008–2013
- Preceded by: Prakash Sonkar
- Succeeded by: Rajesh Sonkar
- Constituency: Sanwer
- In office 1985–1990
- Succeeded by: Prakash Sonkar

Minister of Health and Family Welfare Madhya Pradesh Government
- In office December 2018 – March 2020
- Preceded by: Rustam Singh

Vice President of Madhya Pradesh Congress Committee
- In office 1998–2003

Personal details
- Born: 5 November 1954 (age 72)
- Party: Bharatiya Janata Party
- Other political affiliations: Indian National Congress
- Spouse: Sunita Silawat
- Children: Nitish Silawat, Chinmayee Silawat
- Education: MA LLB Part 1
- Alma mater: Indore University
- Profession: Agriculturist, politician

Tulsi Ram Silawat is an Indian politician serving as a cabinet minister in the Madhya Pradesh state government and a two-time representative of the Sanwer constituency in the Madhya Pradesh Legislative Assembly. He took the oath as a cabinet minister in the new Madhya Pradesh government on 25 December 2018. He joined the Bharatiya Janata Party on 21 March 2020, and took oath as the Water Resources Minister under Shivraj Singh Chouhan's cabinet on 21 April 2020. On 20 October 2020, he resigned from the post of Water Resources Minister. Because, as per Article 164 (4) of the Indian Constitution, a minister who is not a member of the House must be elected to an assembly within 6 months of being appointed minister.

== Career ==
In December 2018, he was inducted into the Kamal Nath cabinet as Minister of Public Health and Family Welfare of Madhya Pradesh. During 2020 Madhya Pradesh political crisis, he supported senior Congress leader Jyotiraditya Scindia and joined BJP with the 22 MLAs who resigned.

== See also ==
- Madhya Pradesh Legislative Assembly
- 2013 Madhya Pradesh Legislative Assembly election
- 2008 Madhya Pradesh Legislative Assembly election
- 1985 Madhya Pradesh Legislative Assembly election
