= Mukesh Pandya =

Indian politician

Mukesh Pandya is a member of the legislative assembly of the Indian state of Madhya Pradesh. He was elected to represent Badnagar in 2013 and belongs to the Bharatiya Janata Party.
