= Paras Chandra Jain =

Indian politician (1950–2026)

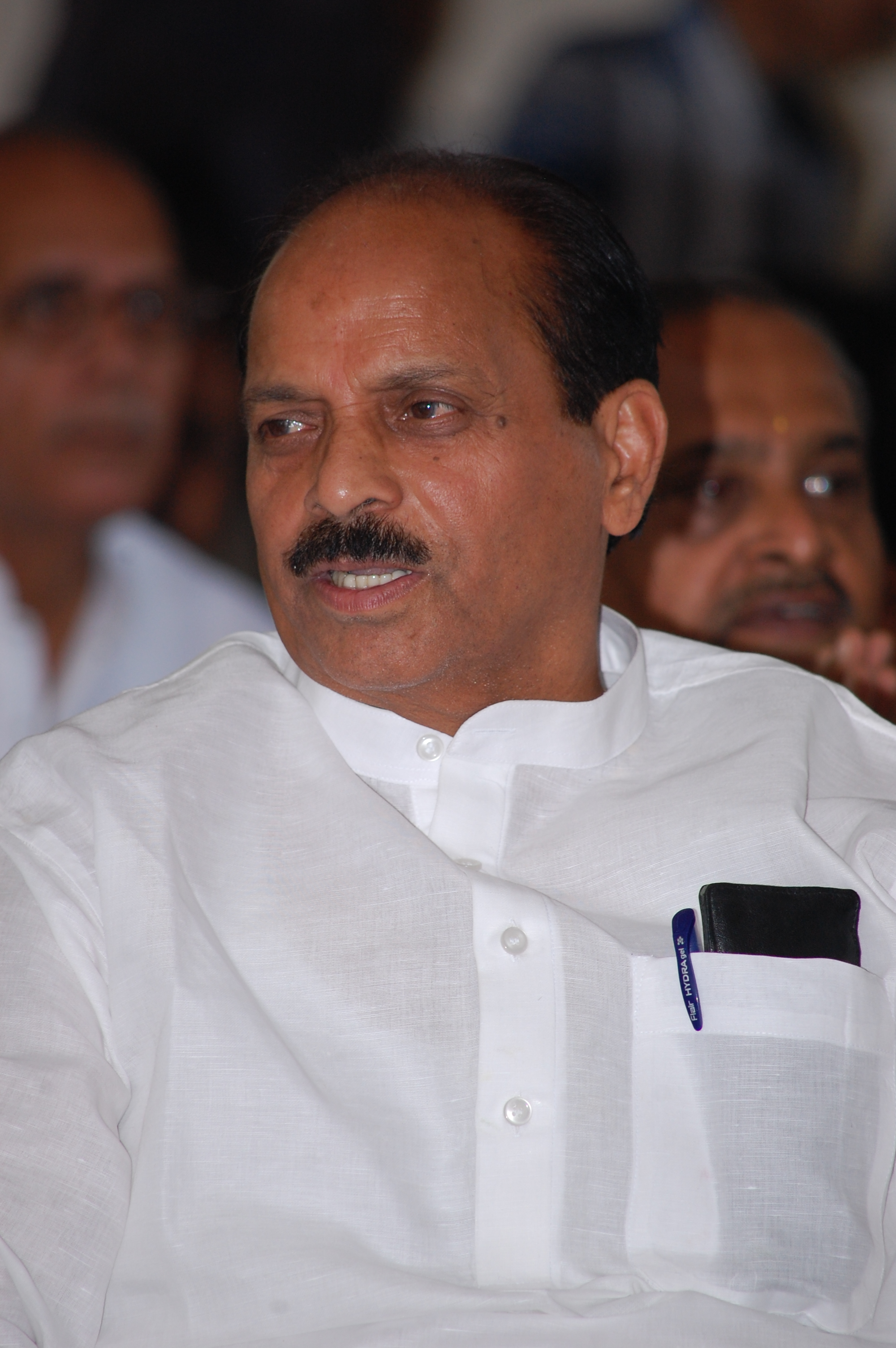

Member of the Legislative Assembly from Madhya Pradesh
- In office 2003–2023
- Preceded by: Rajendra Bharti
- Constituency: Ujjain North

Minister of Energy and New & Renewable Energy, Madhya Pradesh Government
- In office 2016 – December 2018
- Succeeded by: Priyvrat Singh, Harsh Yadav

Personal details
- Born: 20 June 1950 Ujjain, Madhya Bharat, India
- Died: 3 August 2026 (aged 76) Indore, Madhya Pradesh, India
- Party: Bharatiya Janata Party
- Spouse: Angurbala Jain
- Children: 2
- Education: Vikram University
- Profession: Politician

Paras Chandra Jain (20 June 1950 – 3 August 2026) was an Indian politician who was a Cabinet Minister of Energy and New & Renewable Energy in Government. He represented Ujjain North constituency in Madhya Pradesh Assembly, He was a Member of the Legislative Assembly from same constituency since 1990 to 1998 & 2003.

Jain was a senior leader of Bharatiya Janata Party in central India. From 2005 to 2013, he has been Minister of State in Madhya Pradesh Government for various departments, including Forest Department, School Education Department, Higher Education Department, Food, Civil Supplies & Consumer Protection Department. In December 2013, he was made Cabinet Minister of Department of School Education, and in cabinet reshuffle of 2016 was given responsibility of Energy Ministry.

== Early life and education ==
Paras Chandra Jain was born in Ujjain on 20 June 1950, to Samrathmal Tallera and Kailash Bai; his father was a grain merchant. He completed his B.Com. from Vikram University and joined his father in the food grains’ trade after finishing education.

== Early political career ==
Political journey of Paras Jain started from College life. He was an active member of ABVP, he held many offices and eventually joined RSS. Before entering into electoral politics, he worked a lot for social causes, while he was an active SwayamSevak.

== Political career ==
Jain contested and won his first legislative assembly election in the year 1990 from Ujjain Constituency, when BJP came to power in the state, under the leadership of Sunder Lal Patwa, riding on the Ayodhya movement, with 54.21% polling. On 6 December, President Rule was imposed in the state following the Babri Masjid Demolition. In the elections that followed in 1993, BJP faced huge setback and Congress came back to power in Madhya Pradesh, but Paras Jain successfully retained his seat from Ujjain.

Digvijay Singh came back as chief minister in 1998, with Congress leading the state. This time Paras Jain also lost his seat, and faced defeat in the assembly election of 1998. Five years later, BJP under the aggressive leadership of Uma Bharti, was triumphant at the Vidhansabha Elections. This time, Paras Jain regained his Ujjain seat, winning the election with around 16000 votes. In the following Legislative Assembly elections of 2003 & 2008, Jain repeated his victory, with his winning margin increasing every time.

When Uma Bharti stepped down as Chief Minister & Babulal Gaur became CM of Madhya Pradesh, in the cabinet of Gaur, Paras Jain got his first term as Minister in June 2005. He was made state minister of Forest Department. Later, he handled the Energy Ministry, School Education Ministry as State Minister.

In Shivraj Singh Chouhan's 2008 Ministry, he became State Minister for Higher Education. Later he was promoted to State Minister with Independent Charge for Food, Civil Supplies & Consumer Protection Department. In Shivraj Singh Chouhan's 2013 Ministry, the political stature of Paras Jain grew further, he became Cabinet Minister of School Education in 2013, and in the 2016 cabinet reshuffle he became Cabinet Minister of Energy and New & Renewable Energy. Since 2015, when Kailash Vijayvargiya was made National General Secretary of BJP, Paras Jain was the only Cabinet Minister from Malwa region in the Government of Madhya Pradesh.

== Personal life and death ==
In his inner circles, he was known as "Paras Pehalwan". He was fond of exercising, and has also been associated with various sports and yoga activities. He married Angurbala Jain in 1978. They have two children, Swati and Sandesh.

Being born in Ujjain, which is one of the religious cities of India, Paras Jain was highly spiritual and actively participated in number of culture, religious and social activities. Simhastha, one of the four fairs traditionally recognized as Kumbha Melas is conducted in Ujjain, Paras Jain was member of Simhasth Central Committee and was involved closely in preparations of 2016 Simhastha.

Jain died on 3 August 2026, at the age of 76.

== See also ==
- Shivraj Singh Chouhan Third ministry (2013–)
- List of people from Madhya Pradesh
- Category:Bharatiya Janata Party politicians
