= Bharatiya Pratiraksha Mazdoor Sangh =

Trade union in India

BPMS
- Bharatiya Pratiraksha Mazdoor Sangh
- Headquarters: 2A Navin Market, Kanpur – 502 205
- Location: India
- Affiliations: Bharatiya Mazdoor Sangh
- Website: www.bpms.org.in

The Bharatiya Pratiraksha Mazdoor Sangh (Hindi: bhāratīya pratirakṣa mazdūr saṁgh, literally "Indian Defence Workers Union", abbreviated BPMS) is a trade union in India, affiliated to the Bharatiya Mazdoor Sangh, that organizes civilian workers in factories and other establishments under the Indian Ministry of Defence. The president is Dinesh Kumar and general secretary is Mukesh Singh.
