= Manohar Untwal =

Indian politician (1966–2020)

Member of Parliament, Lok Sabha
- In office May 2014 – December 2018
- Preceded by: Sajjan Singh Verma
- Succeeded by: Mahendra Solanki
- Constituency: Dewas

Personal details
- Born: 19 July 1966 Dhar, Madhya Pradesh, India
- Died: 30 January 2020 (aged 53) Delhi, India
- Party: Bharatiya Janata Party
- Spouse: Smt. Manu Utawal
- Children: 3
- Education: Vikram University
- Occupation: Politician and businessman.
- As of 16 December, 2016

Manohar Untwal (19 July 1966 – 30 January 2020; Hindi pronunciation: [mənoːɦəɾ ũːʈʋaːl]) was an Indian politician from the state of Madhya Pradesh, belonging to Bharatiya Janata Party. He was elected to MP's Vidhan Sabha in 2013 from Agar (Vidhan Sabha constituency). He vacated the seat after winning the 2014 Indian general elections from the Dewas (Lok Sabha constituency). In 2018 he was again elected to Vidhan Sabha from Agar. He suffered brain haemorrhage and died in January 2020 due to a stroke.

Lok Sabha
Preceded by Sajjan Singh Verma	Member of Lok Sabha for Dewas; 2014–2019	Succeeded by Mahendra Solanki
