= Gopal Singh =

Gopal Singh may refer to:

- Raja Gopal Singh, former Speaker of Rajasthan Legislative Assembly
- Gopal Singh (politician) (1917–1990), Indian mystic, poet, writer and philosopher
- Gopal Singh Rawat, Indian bureaucrat
- Gopal Singh Khalsa, Indian freedom fighter and politician
- Gopal Singh Chauhan, Indian politician, member of the Indian National Congress party
- Gopal K. Singh (born 1976), Indian actor
