= Babulal Jain =

Indian politician (1934–2021)

Babulal Jain (British Raj, 17 November 1934 – 6 August 2021) was an Indian politician of Bharatiya Janata Party. He was a minister in Government of Madhya Pradesh and a leader of the Janata Party. He was also MP State Planning Commission Vice-chairman. He was elected to the state assembly from Ujjain Uttar constituency.
