= Premchand Guddu =

Indian politician

Premchand Guddu Borasi

Member of Parliament in Lok Sabha
- In office 2009–2014
- Preceded by: Satyanarayan Jatiya
- Succeeded by: Chintamani Malviya
- Constituency: Ujjain

Member of Legislative Assembly from Madhya Pradesh
- In office 1998–2003
- Preceded by: Prakash Sonkar
- Succeeded by: Prakash Sonkar
- Constituency: Sanwer

Personal details
- Born: 2 September 1960 (age 65) Indore, Madhya Pradesh, India
- Party: Indian National Congress
- Spouse: Asha Borasi
- Children: 4
- Profession: Agriculturist, Politician

Guddu Premchand (born 2 September 1960) is an Indian politician, belonging to Indian National Congress. Earlier he was a member of Indian National Congress, but later on 2 November 2018 he joined BJP. However, he re-joined the Congress party once again on 31 March 2020.

In the 2009 election he was elected to the 15th Lok Sabha from the Ujjain Lok Sabha constituency of Madhya Pradesh.

He was also member of Madhya Pradesh legislative Assembly for two terms between 1998 and 2008.

== Personal life ==
He is a farmer and business person and resides at Indore. He is married to Asha Borasi and has three daughters and one son.
