= Third Chouhan ministry =

- 14th Ministry of Madhya Pradesh
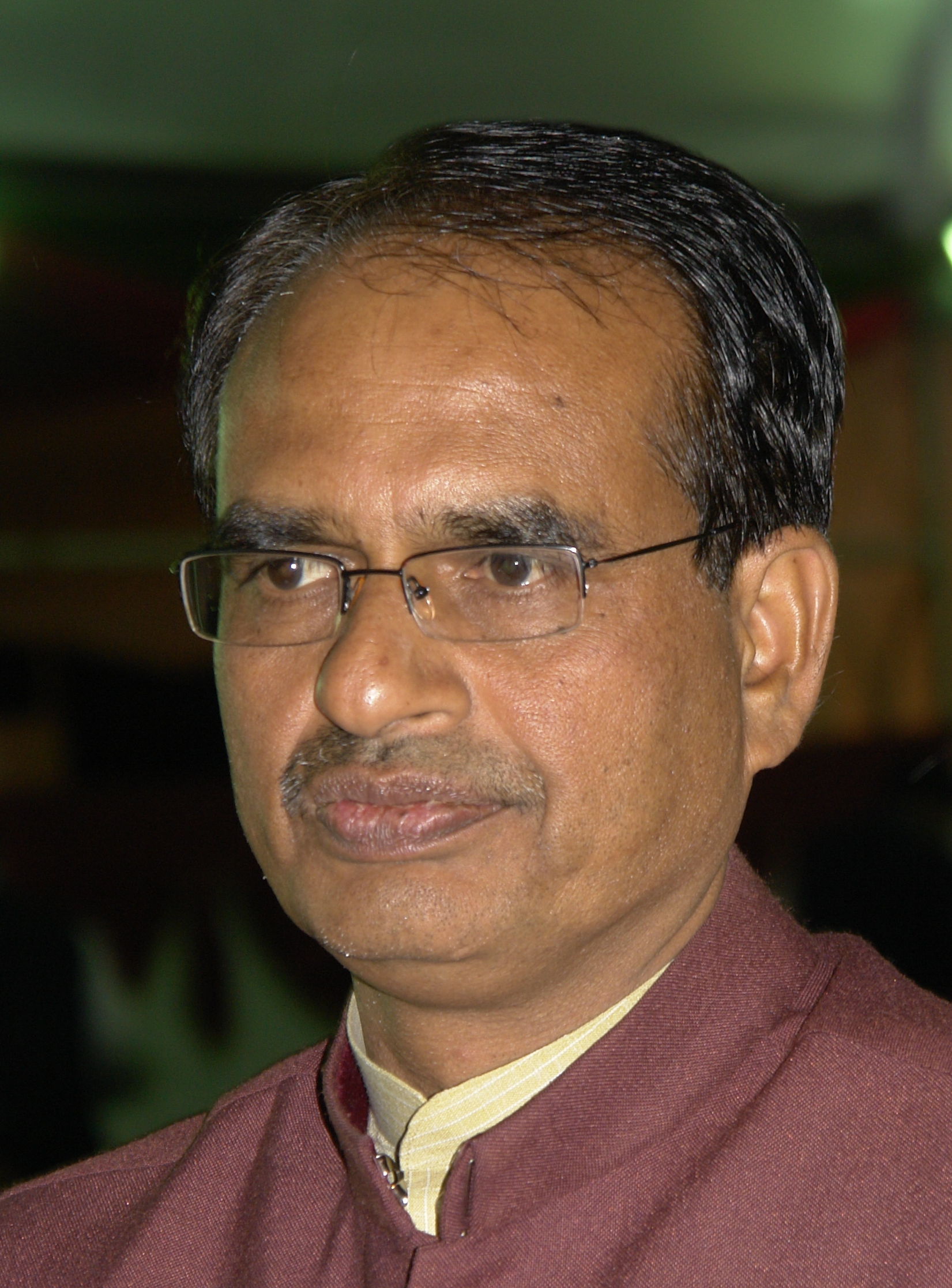
- Shivraj Singh Chauhan, Hon'ble Chief Minister of Madhya Pradesh
- Date formed: December 2013
- Date dissolved: December 2018

People and organisations
- Head of state: Governor Ram Naresh Yadav; Governor Anandiben Patel
- Head of government: Shivraj Singh Chauhan
- No. of ministers: 31
- Member parties: BJP
- Status in legislature: Majority
- Opposition party: INC
- Opposition leader: Ajay Singh

History
- Election: 2013
- Legislature term: 5 years
- Predecessor: Second Chouhan ministry
- Successor: Kamal Nath Ministry

This is a list of Council of ministers from Shivraj Singh Chouhan's third cabinet of Madhya Pradesh starting from December 2013 till December 2018. Shivraj Singh Chouhan is the leader of BJP who was sworn in the Chief Minister of Madhya Pradesh in December 2013.

== Council of Ministers ==
SI No.	Name	Constituency	Department	Party
1.	Shivraj Singh Chouhan, Chief Minister		General Administration, Aviation. Other departments not allotted to any Minister.	BJP
2.	Gopal Bhargava		Minister of Panchayats, Rural Development & Social Justice and Disabled Welfare.	BJP
3.	Jayant Kumar Malaiya		Minister of Finance & Commercial Taxes.	BJP
4.	Dr. Gauri Shankar Shejwar		Minister of Forests, Planning, Economics and Statistics.	BJP
5.	Om Prakash Dhurve		Minister of Food, Civil Supplies and Consumer Protection, Labour.	BJP
6.	Kunwar Vijay Shah		Minister of School Education.	BJP
7.	Gauri Shankar Bisen		Minister of Farmers Welfare and Agriculture Development.	BJP
8.	Rustam Singh		Minister of Public Health and Family Welfare.	BJP
9.	Archana Chitnis		Minister of Women and Child Development.	BJP
10.	Umashankar Gupta		Minister of Revenue, Science and Technology.	BJP
11.	Kusum Mehdele		Minister of Public Health Engineering and Jail.	BJP
12.	Yashodhara Raje Scindia		Minister of Sports and Youth Welfare, Religious Trusts and Endowment.	BJP
13.	Paras Chandra Jain		Minister of Energy.	BJP
14.	Rajendra Shukla		Minister of Mineral Resources, Commerce, Industry and Employment, Overseas Indian.	BJP
15.	Antar Singh Arya		Animal Husbandry, Fisheries Fishermen Welfare and Development, Cottage and Village Industries, Environment.	BJP
16.	Rampal Singh		Minister of Public Works, Law and Legislative Affairs.	BJP
17.	Maya Singh		Minister of Urban Development and Housing.	BJP
18.	Bhupendra Singh		Minister Of Home and Transport.	BJP
19.	Jaibhan Singh Pawaiya		Minister of Higher Education, Public Service Management, Public Grievances Redressal.	BJP
20.	Narayan Singh Kushwaha		Minister Of New & Renewal Energy.	BJP

=== Minister of State ===
SI No.	Name	Constituency	Department	Party
1.	Deepak Joshi		Minister of Technical Education and Skills Development, School Education.	BJP
2.	Lal Singh Arya		Minister of Narmada Valley Development General Administration, Aviation, Happiness, Tribal Affairs, Scheduled Caste Welfare Department.	BJP
3.	Sharad Jain		Minister of Medical Education, Public Health and Family Welfare and Parliamentary Affairs.	BJP
4.	Surendra Patwa		Minister of Culture and Tourism.	BJP
5.	Harsh Singh		Minister of Water Resources.	BJP
6.	Sanjay Pathak		Minister of Micro, Small and Medium Enterprises, Higher Education, Social Justice and Disabled Welfare.	BJP
7.	Lalita Yadav		Minister of Backward Class & Minority Welfare, Denotified Nomadic and Sem-Nomadic Caste Welfare, Women and Child Development.	BJP
8.	Vishvas Sarang		Minister of Cooperatives, Bhopal Gas Tragedy Relief and Rehabilitation, Rural Development.	BJP
9.	Surya Prakash Meena		Minister of Horticulture and Food Processing, Forest.	BJP
10.	Balkrishna Patidar		Minister of Labour, Farmer Welfare & Agriculture Development.	BJP
11.	Jalam Singh Patel		Minister of AYUSH, Cottage & Rural Industries, Public Health Engineering.	BJP

=== Former Ministers ===
SI No.	Name	Constituency	Department	Party
1.	Babulal Gaur		Minister of Home.	BJP
2.	Sartaj Singh		Minister of Forest and Public Works Department.	BJP
3.	Gyan Singh		Minister of Tribal Welfare, Scheduled Castes Welfare.	BJP
4.	Narottam Mishra		Minister of Water Resources, Public Relations, Parliamentary Affairs.	BJP

== See also ==
- Government of Madhya Pradesh
- Madhya Pradesh Legislative Assembly
