= Ujjain South Assembly constituency =

Legislative Assembly constituency in Madhya Pradesh, India

Coordinates: 23.14°N 75.79°E

Ujjain South
- Constituency No. 218 for the Madhya Pradesh Legislative Assembly

Constituency details
- Country: India
- Region: Central India
- State: Madhya Pradesh
- District: Ujjain
- Lok Sabha constituency: Ujjain
- Established: 1951
- Reservation: None

Member of Legislative Assembly
- 16th Madhya Pradesh Legislative Assembly
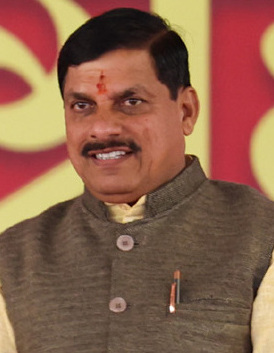
- Incumbent Mohan Yadav; Chief Minister of Madhya Pradesh
- Party: BJP
- Elected year: 2023
- Preceded by: Shivnarayan Jagirdar

Ujjain South is one of the 230 Vidhan Sabha (Legislative Assembly) constituencies of Madhya Pradesh state in central India. This constituency came into existence in 1951, as one of the 79 Vidhan Sabha constituencies of the erstwhile Madhya Bharat state. Chief minister of state represents this constituency.

== Overview ==
Ujjain South (constituency number 217) is one of the 7 Vidhan Sabha constituencies located in Ujjain district. This constituency covers the R.I.Circle including Lalpur OG of Ujjain Tehsil, ward numbers 33, and 36 to 54 of the Ujjain Municipal Corporation. Ujjain Dakshin is part of Ujjain (Lok Sabha constituency) along with eight other Vidhan Sabha segments covering the entire Ujjain district and part of Ratlam district.

== Members of the Legislative Assembly ==
| Year | Name | Party |
|---|---|---|
| 1957 | Vishwanath Ayachit | Indian National Congress |
| 1962 | Hansaben | Indian National Congress |
| 1967 | Gangaram | Bharatiya Jana Sangh |
| 1972 | Durgadas Suryavansi | Indian National Congress |
| 1977 | Govindrao Naik | Janata Party |
| 1980 | Mahavir Prasad Vashistha | Indian National Congress (Indira) |
| 1985 | Mahavir Prasad Vashistha | Indian National Congress |
| 1990 | Babu Lal Mahere | Bharatiya Janata Party |
| 1993 | Shiva Kotwani | Bharatiya Janata Party |
| 1998 | Priti Bhargava | Indian National Congress |
| 2003 | Shivnarayan Jagirdar | Bharatiya Janata Party |
| 2008 | Shivnarayan Jagirdar | Bharatiya Janata Party |
| 2013 | Mohan Yadav | Bharatiya Janata Party |
| 2018 | Mohan Yadav | Bharatiya Janata Party |
| 2023 | Mohan Yadav | Bharatiya Janata Party |

== Election results ==
=== 2023 ===
2023 Madhya Pradesh Legislative Assembly election: Ujjain South
| Party | Candidate | Votes | % | ±% |
|---|---|---|---|---|
| BJP | Mohan Yadav | 95,699 | 52.08 | ▲5.37 |
| INC | Chetan Premnarayan Yadav | 82,758 | 45.04 | ▲9.66 |
| NOTA | None of the above | 2,098 | 1.14 | ▼0.08 |
| Majority | | 12,941 | 7.04 | ▼4.29 |
| Turnout | | 183,738 | 71.43 | ▲2.76 |
| BJP hold | | Swing | | |

=== 2018 ===
2018 Madhya Pradesh Legislative Assembly election: Ujjain South
| Party | Candidate | Votes | % | ±% |
|---|---|---|---|---|
| BJP | Mohan Yadav | 78,178 | 46.71 | |
| INC | Rajendra Vashishtha | 59,218 | 35.38 | |
| Independent | Jay Singh Darbar | 19,560 | 11.69 | |
| Sapaks Party | Dr. Radheshyam Mishra 'Pandit Ji' | 3,172 | 1.9 | |
| BSP | Indar Lal Makwana | 1,900 | 1.14 | |
| SS | Pankaj Mandloi | 1,616 | 0.97 | |
| NOTA | None of the above | 2,039 | 1.22 | |
| Majority | | 18,960 | 11.33 | |
| Turnout | | 167,378 | 68.67 | |
| BJP hold | | Swing | | |

=== 2013 ===
2013 Madhya Pradesh Legislative Assembly election: Ujjain South
| Party | Candidate | Votes | % | ±% |
|---|---|---|---|---|
| BJP | Mohan Yadav | 73,108 | 51.64 | |
| INC | Jaysingh Darbar | 63,456 | 44.82 | |
| BSP | Laxmi Naryan Marmat | 1,200 | 0.85 | |
| NOTA | None of the above | 2,311 | 1.63 | |
| Majority | | 8,360 | 6.82 | |
| Turnout | | 138,379 | 68.92 | |
| BJP hold | | Swing | | |

== See also ==
- Ujjain
- Ujjain (Lok Sabha constituency)
