= Unhel =

Unhel is a city in Ujjain district in the Malwa region in the Indian state of Madhya Pradesh.

== Administration ==
Unhel is a tehsil and a Nagar Panchayat. Unhel city is divided into 15 wards.

उन्हेल Unhel
- UNHEL
- Map showing unhel in Madhya Pradesh
- Coordinates: 23.338°N 75.558°E
- Country: India
- State: Madhya Pradesh
- District: Ujjain
- Tehsil: Unhel
- Elevation: 495 m (1,624 ft)

Population (2011)
  - Total: 14,774

Language
  - Official: Hindi
- Time zone: UTC+5:30 (IST)
- PIN code: 456221

== Demographics ==
As of 2026 Unhel had a population of 25000 and surrounding villages joining 2000 more around towns periphery.

The female sex ratio was of 968 against state average of 931. The child sex ratio was around 907, compared to the state average of 918. Literacy rate is 72.65%, higher than the state average of 69.32%. Male literacy was around 83.08% while female literacy was 61.98%.

Unhel has 2,582 houses supplied by water and sewerage. It is authorized to build roads and impose taxes on properties under its jurisdiction.

== Transportation ==
=== Road ===
Unhel is near A MPSH17

- Ujjain - 30 KM
- Nagda - 18 Km
- Indore - 90 KM
- Bhopal - 233 KM
- Neemuch - 170 Km
- Mandsaur- 115 KM
- Udaipur - 300 KM
- Delhi - 810 KM
- Mumbai - 658 Km

=== Railway ===
Unhel railway station is 9 km from the city.

=== Air ===
Nagda has an air strip about 20 km from the city. The nearest airport is located in Indore about 100 km from the city.

== Economy ==
5,506 people were engaged in work or business activity. Of this 4,155 were males while 1,351 were females. 89.14% were engaged in Main Work while 10.86% were engaged in Marginal Work.
