= Tarana (Madhya Pradesh) =

Town in Ujjain district, Madhya Pradesh, India

- Town
- Location in Madhya Pradesh, India Tarana (India)
- Coordinates: 23.33°N 76.03°E
- Country: India
- State: Madhya Pradesh
- District: Ujjain
- Elevation: 490 m (1,610 ft)

Population (2011)
  - Total: 24,908

Languages
  - Official: Hindi
- Time zone: UTC+5:30 (IST)
- ISO 3166 code: IN-MP
- Vehicle registration: MP

Tarana is a town and a nagar parishad in Ujjain district in the Indian state of Madhya Pradesh. Tarana is a tehsil in Ujjain and the distance to Ujjain is 34 km. Tarana was part of Holkar estate. The current M.L.A of Tarana constituency is Mahesh Parmar (INC).

== Geography ==
Tarana is located at 23.33°N 76.03°E. It has an average elevation of 490 metres (1,607 feet).

== Demographics ==
As of 2001 India census, Tarana is a Nagar Panchayat city in district of Ujjain, Madhya Pradesh. The Tarana city is divided into 15 wards for which elections are held every 5 years. The Tarana Nagar Panchayat has population of 24,908 of which 12,825 are males while 12,083 are females as per report released by Census India 2011.

The population of children aged 0-6 is 3298 which is 13.24% of total population of Tarana (NP). In Tarana Nagar Panchayat, the female sex ratio is 942 against state average of 931. Moreover, the child sex ratio in Tarana is around 916 compared to Madhya Pradesh state average of 918. The literacy rate of Tarana city is 80.22% higher than the state average of 69.32%. In Tarana, male literacy is around 89.07% while the female literacy rate is 70.86%.

== Climate ==
Tarana experiences typical climate conditions of the interior Indian subcontinent. The summer months (April–June) are harsh with temperatures reaching up to 45 °C. In addition, hot winds (called loo) may blow in the afternoons, worsening the heat. The winter months (Nov.–Feb.) are pleasant and cool with daytime temperatures typically 20 °C. The monsoon typically arrives in late June and the months of June till September receive moderate to heavy rainfall. There are periods of rainfall followed by long periods of bright sunshine and high humidity. The month of October generally is very warm and with high humidity.
