= Sanwer =

- Town
- Location in Madhya Pradesh, India Sanwer (India)
- Coordinates: 22°58′26″N 75°49′52″E
- Country: India
- State: Madhya Pradesh
- District: Indore

Government
  - Type: Municipal corporation

Population (2011)
  - Total: 197,835

Languages
  - Official: Hindi, Malvi, English, Urdu
- Time zone: UTC+5:30 (IST)
- PIN: 453551
- ISO 3166 code: IN-MP
- Vehicle registration: MP-09

Sanwer is a Nagar panchayat in Indore district in the Indian state of Madhya Pradesh. It is situated between two major cities of Madhya Pradesh- Indore and Ujjain.They have a spiritual place because of one and only ultehanuman and the chamunda mata temple oldest templs in sanwer

Nearest railway station is Ujjain Junction which is 25.6 km from here.

== Demographics ==
As of the 2011 Census of India, Sanwer had a population of 197,835. Males constitute 52% of the population and females 48%. Sanwer has an average literacy rate of 64.42%, higher than the national average of 59.5%: male literacy is 74%, and female literacy is 54%. In Sanwer, 14% of the population is under 6 years of age. The elevation of Sanwer is lies between 488.92m to 579.99 meter.

Sanwer has 146 villages and 78 Gram Panchayat.

== Education ==
Sanwer has a Government Degree College which is established in 1987 and affiliated with Devi Ahilya Vishwavidyalaya. It offers graduation and post graduation course in Art, Science and Commerce Stream.

=== Schools in Sanwer ===
No.	Higher Secondary School	Middle School
1	Shani International School	Saraswati Gyan Mandir Middle School
2	Indore Public School	Spring Flower Academy
3	Govt. Boys Higher Secondary School	Gurukul Public School
4	Parakh Public Higher Secondary School	St. Joseph Convent School
5	Golden Future Higher Secondary School	Shree Sandipani Children Academy
6	Bal Vinay Mandir Higher Secondary School	Shree Sandipani International School
7	Govt. Girls Higher Secondary School	

== Weather ==
Sanwer has a borderline humid subtropical climate (Köppen climate classification Cwa) and tropical savanna climate (Aw).

In winter, there is much less rainfall in Sanwer than in summer. According to Köppen and Geiger, this climate is classified as Aw. In Sanwer, the average annual temperature is 25.0 °C. In a year, the average rainfall is 955 mm.

Precipitation is the lowest in February, with an average of 1 mm. With an average of 285 mm, the most precipitation falls in July. At an average temperature of 32.9 °C, May is the hottest month of the year. January has the lowest average temperature of the year. It is 18.4 °C.

Between the driest and wettest months, the difference in precipitation is 284 mm. During the year, the average temperatures vary by 14.5 °C.
