= Phool Chand Verma =

Indian politician

Phool Chand Verma (born 12 June 1939, Indore) is an Indian politician, a former member of the Lok Sabha and a leader of Bharatiya Janata Party. He was first elected to the Lok Sabha from Ujjain constituency in Madhya Pradesh state in 1971 as a Bharatiya Jana Sangh candidate. He was elected to the 6th, 7th, 9th and 10th Lok Sabha (1977–1984, and 1989–1996) from Shajapur constituency (reserved for Scheduled Caste candidates) in Madhya Pradesh state.
