= Sajjan Singh Verma =

Indian politician

Member of the Madhya Pradesh Legislative Assembly
- In office 2018–2023
- Preceded by: Rajendra Phoolchand Verma
- Constituency: Sonkatch
- In office 1985–1990
- Preceded by: Bapulal Kishan lal Malviya
- Succeeded by: Kailash
- Constituency: Sonkatch
- In office 1998–2009
- Preceded by: Surender Verma
- Succeeded by: Rajendra Phoolchand Verma
- Constituency: Sonkatch

Member of Parliament, Lok Sabha
- In office 2009–2014
- Preceded by: Hukumchand Kacchaway
- Succeeded by: Manohar Untwal
- Constituency: Dewas

President of Akhil Bhartiya Khatik Samaj

Personal details
- Born: 24 August 1952 (age 74) Indore, Madhya Bharat, India
- Citizenship: India
- Party: Indian National Congress
- Spouse: Mrs. Subhadra Verma.
- Children: 2 sons, 2 daughters
- Education: MA (Sociology).
- Alma mater: Devi Ahilya Vishwavidyalaya, Indore
- Occupation: Agriculturist, builder & politician

Sajjan Singh Verma is an Indian politician, and a member of Indian National Congress, currently serving as an MLA from Sonkatch in Madhya Pradesh. He was a member of the 15th Lok Sabha of India representing the Dewas Lok Sabha constituency of Madhya Pradesh.Verma resigned in March 2020 as PWD Minister, when the Congress Government led by Chief Minister Kamalnath was toppled by the BJP. He belongs to chandravanshi Khati community. He also National President of Akhil Bhartiya chandravanshi Khati Samaj.

== Early life and education ==
Sajjan Singh Verma holds Master of Arts (in Sociology) degree from G.A.C.C., Indore, Madhya Pradesh.

== Posts Held ==
#	From	To	Position
01	1983	1985	Corporator, Indore Municipal Corporation, (Madhya Pradesh)
02	1985	1990	Member, Madhya Pradesh Legislative Assembly
03	1998	2003	Member, Madhya Pradesh Legislative Assembly
04	2003	2008	Member, Madhya Pradesh Legislative Assembly
05	2008	2009	Member, Madhya Pradesh Legislative Assembly
06	1997	1998	Chairman, Madhya Pradesh Laghu Udhyog Nigam (Govt. Undertaking)
07	1998	2003	Cabinet Minister for Urban Administration and Development, Govt. of Madhya Pradesh
08	2009	2014	Elected to 15th Lok Sabha
09	2009	2014	Member, Committee on the Welfare of Scheduled Castes and Scheduled Tribes
10	2009	2014	Member, Committee on Water Resources Committee on Energy
11	2010	2014	Member, Committee on the Welfare of Scheduled Castes and Scheduled Tribes
12	2019	2020	Cabinet Minister for Public Works Department, Govt. of Madhya Pradesh

== See also ==
- Madhya Pradesh Legislative Assembly
- 2013 Madhya Pradesh Legislative Assembly election
- 2008 Madhya Pradesh Legislative Assembly election

Lok Sabha
Vacant District suspended between 1967-2009 Title last held by Hukumchand Kacchaway	Member of Lok Sabha for Dewas; 2009–2014	Succeeded by Manohar Untwal
