= Ujjain district =

Coordinates: 23°25′N 75°30′E

- District of Madhya Pradesh
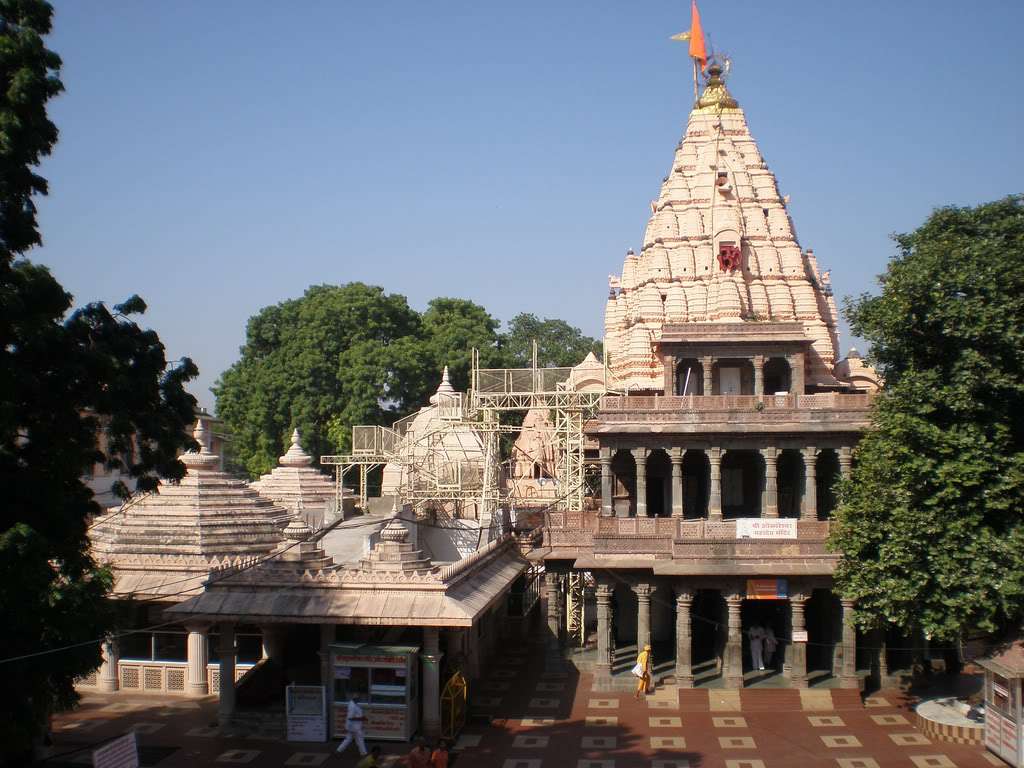
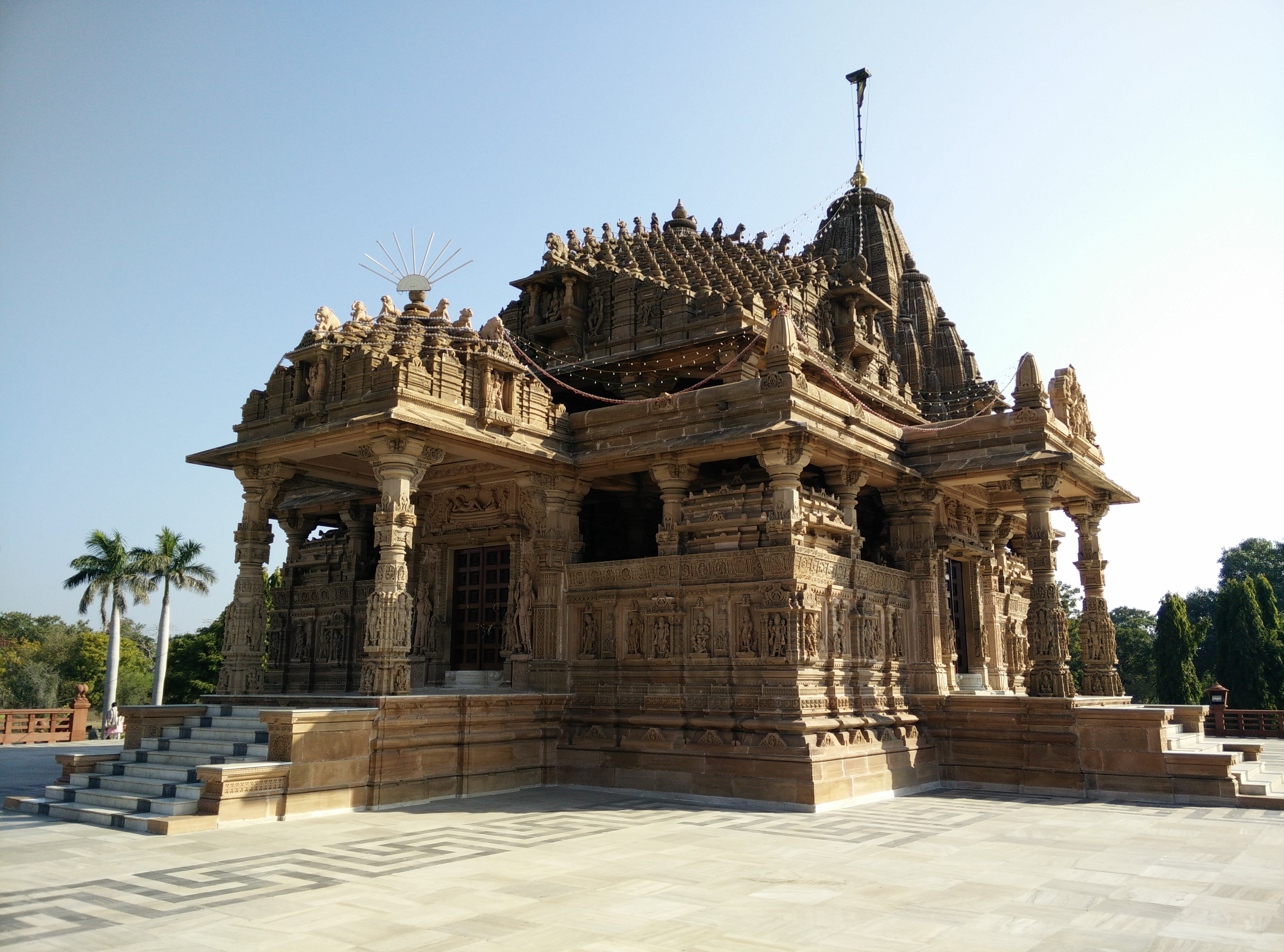
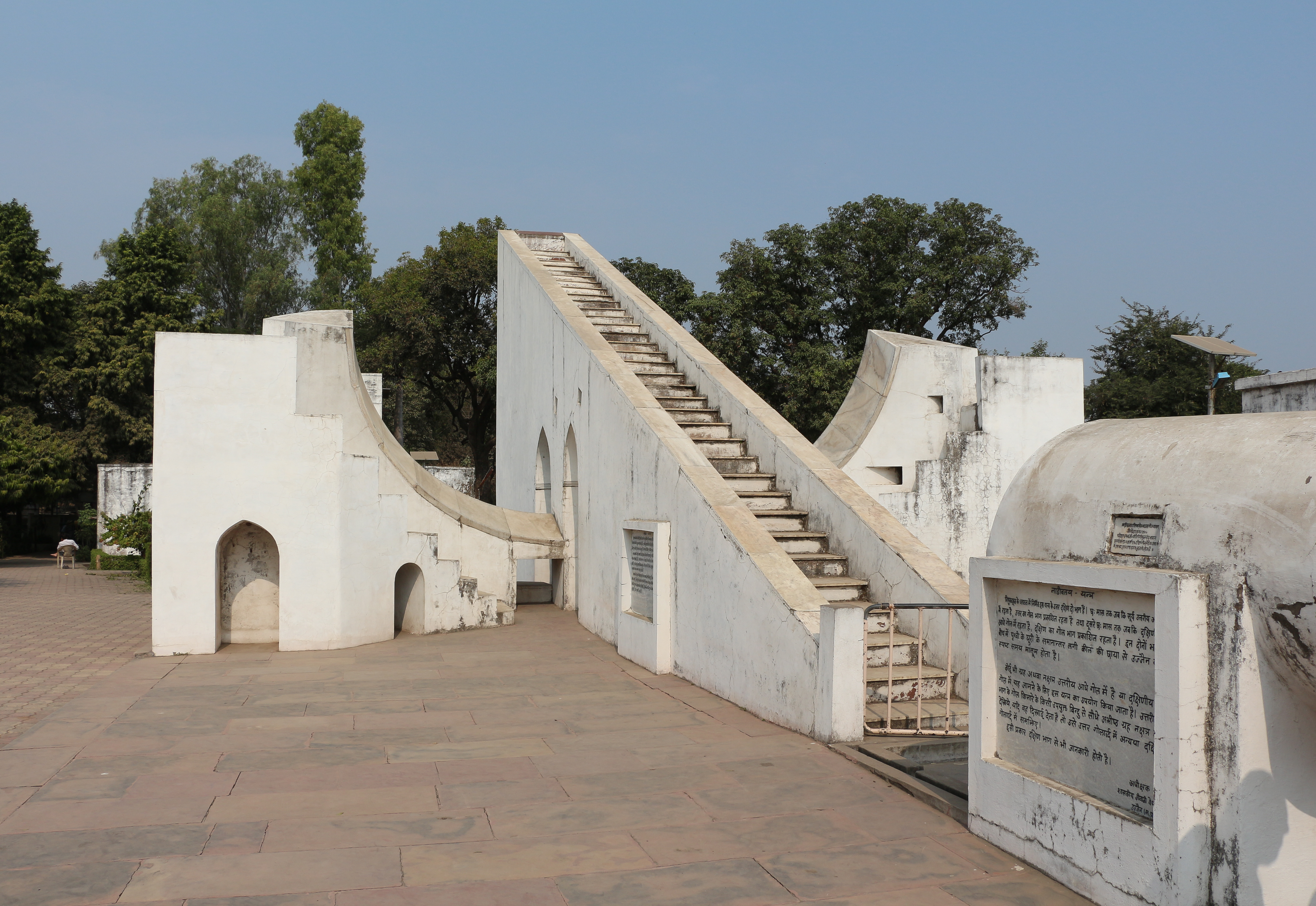
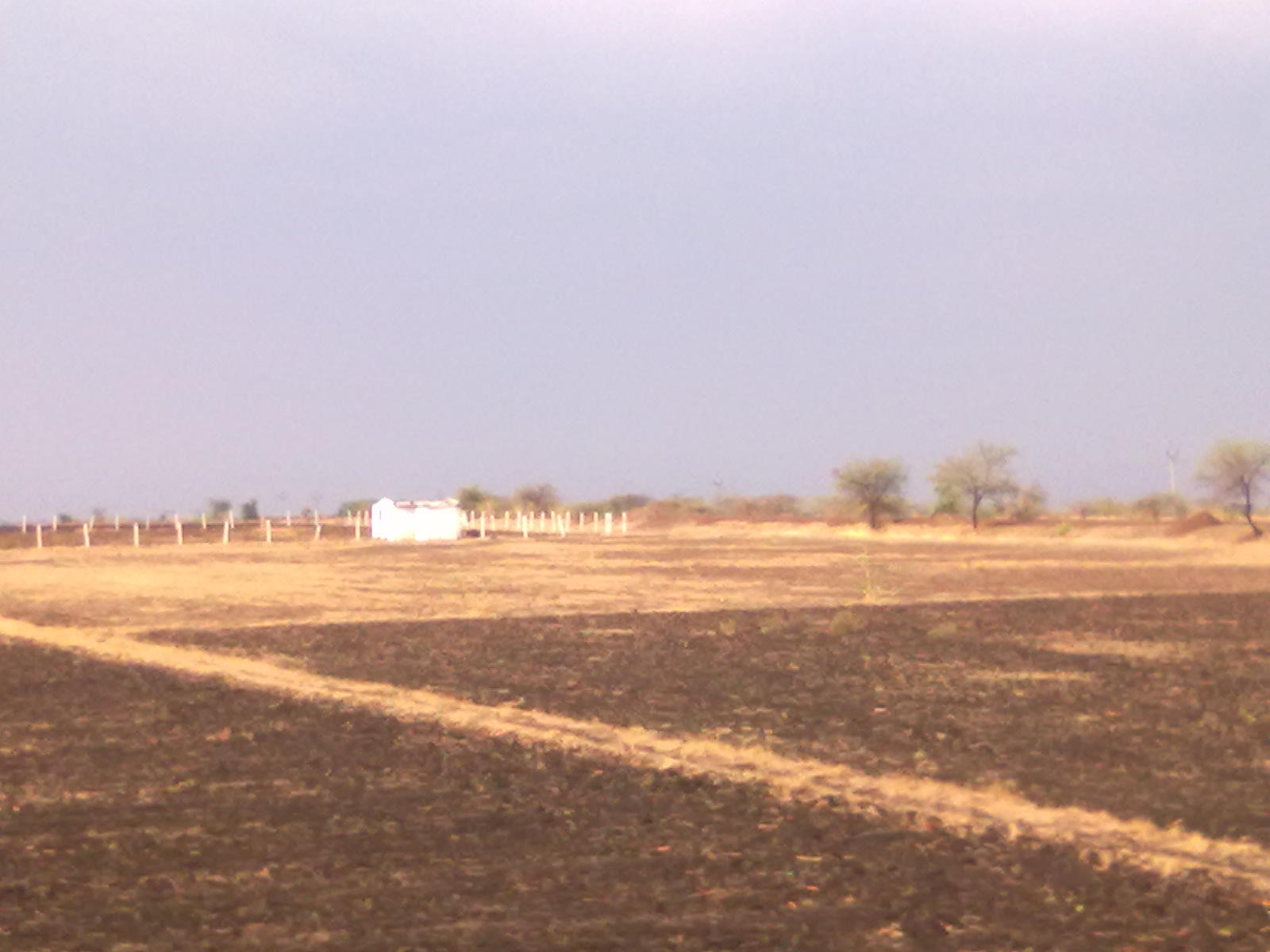
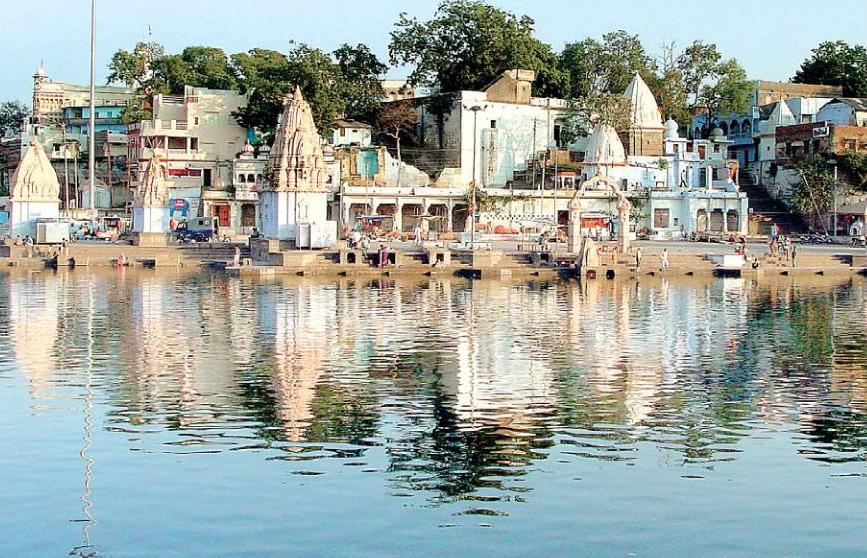
- Clockwise from top-left: Mahakal Temple, temple near Nagda, fields near Ujjain, Ram Ghat, Jantar Mantar

- Location of Ujjain district in Madhya Pradesh
- Country: India
- State: Madhya Pradesh
- Division: Ujjain
- Headquarters: Ujjain

Government
  - Lok Sabha constituencies: Ujjain

Area
  - Total: 6,091 km^{2} (2,352 sq mi)

Population (2011)
  - Total: 1,986,864
  - Density: 326.2/km^{2} (844.8/sq mi)

Demographics
  - Literacy: 73.55 per cent
  - Sex ratio: 954
- Time zone: UTC+05:30 (IST)
- Website: ujjain.nic.in

Ujjain district (Hindi pronunciation: [ʊd͡ːʒɛːn̪]) is a district of Madhya Pradesh state in central India. The historic city of Ujjain is the district headquarters. The district has an area of 6,091 km^{2}, and a population of 19,86,864 (2011 census), a 16.12% increase from its 2001 population of 17,10,982.

== Geography ==
The district is bounded by the districts of Agar malwa to the north, Shajapur to the east, Dewas to the southeast, Indore to the south, Dhar to the southwest, and Ratlam to the west and northwest. The district is part of Ujjain Division.

=== Rivers and lakes ===
The main river is the Shipra river, a tributary of the Chambal river in the east. Other small rivers include the Gambhir river and Kahn river, two tributaries of the Shipra.

=== Cities and towns ===
- Ujjain
- Badnagar
- Fatehabad Chandrawatiganj
- Khachrod
- Mahidpur
- Tarana
- Unhel
- Ghatiya

=== Villages ===
- Jagoti
- Karaudia

== Divisions ==
- Tehsils of Ujjain District
1. Ujjain Urban
2. Ujjain Rural
3. Ujjain Kothi Mahal
4. Ghatiya
5. Tarana
6. Makdone
7. Mehidpur
8. Jharda
9. Badnagar
10. Khachrod
11. Nagda
12. Unhel
- Blocks of District Ujjain
1. Badnagar
2. Ghatiya
3. Nagda-Khachrod
4. Mahidpur
5. Tarana
6. Ujjain

== Government ==
At present, after the delimitation of parliamentary and legislative assembly constituencies in 2008, there are eight Vidhan Sabha constituencies in this district: Nagada-Khachrod, Mahidpur, Tarana, Ghatiya, Ujjain Dakshin, Ujjain Uttar, Badnagar including a lot from Ratlam District. It is reserved for the candidates belonging to the Scheduled castes since 1966. The current member of the Lok Sabha from Ujjain constituency is Anil firoziya of the Bharatiya Janata Party (BJP).

== Demographics ==
Historical population
Year	Pop.	±% p.a.
1901	295,312	—
1911	340,132	+1.42%
1921	337,554	−0.08%
1931	396,894	+1.63%
1941	454,370	+1.36%
1951	543,325	+1.80%
1961	661,720	+1.99%
1971	862,516	+2.69%
1981	1,117,002	+2.62%
1991	1,383,086	+2.16%
2001	1,710,982	+2.15%
2011	1,986,864	+1.51%

Religions in Ujjain district (2011)
Religion	Percent
Hinduism	86.48%
Islam	11.73%
Jainism	1.24%
Other or not stated	0.55%

According to the 2011 census Ujjain District has a population of 1,986,864, roughly equal to the nation of Slovenia or the US state of New Mexico. This gives it a ranking of 233rd in India (out of a total of 640). The district has a population density of 326 inhabitants per square kilometre (840/sq mi). Its population growth rate over the decade 2001-2011 was 16.11%. Ujjain has a sex ratio of 954 females for every 1000 males, and a literacy rate of 73.55%. 39.22% of the population lives in urban areas. Scheduled Castes and Scheduled Tribes make up 26.36% and 2.45% of the population respectively.

Languages of Ujjain district (2011)
1. Malvi (47.6%)
2. Hindi (47.3%)
3. Urdu (2.83%)
4. Others (2.29%)

At the time of the 2011 Census of India, 47.58% of the population in the district spoke Malvi, 47.30% Hindi, 2.83% Urdu, 0.58% Gujarati, 0.56% Marathi and 0.40% Sindhi as their first language.

== Educational Institutes in Ujjain ==
- Vikram University
- Maharshi Panini Sanskrit University.
- Pt. Jawaharlal Nehru Institute of Business Management
- Ruxmaniben Deepchand Gardi Medical College
- Mahakal Institute of Technology
- Ujjain Engineering College

=== Vikram Uddhyog Puri ===
The Government of Madhya Pradesh has allotted 1,200 acres for the development of Knowledge City near Ujjain which will be known as Vikram Uddhyog Puri. The city will be mainly used for the education sector and is a part of the ambitious Delhi Mumbai Industrial Corridor project. The city will come up near Narwar village on Dewas-Ujjain Road.

== Notable site ==
- Mahakaleshwar Jyotirlinga

== See also ==
- Nagda district
- Bhat Pachlana
