= Narain Singh =

Narain Singh may refer to:

- Narain Singh (politician), Indian politician
- Tribhuvan Narain Singh, Indian politician, former chief minister of Uttar Pradesh

== See also ==
- Narayan Singh Burdak, Indian politician
- Narain Singh Keshari, Indian politician
- Narain Singh Sambyal ("Saviour of Kashmir"), Jammu and Kashmir State Forces officer in the First Kashmir War (Indo-Pakistani war of 1947–1948)
- Narain Singh Shahbazpuri, Indian politician
