= Narain Singh Sambyal =

Saviour of Kashmir

Colonel Narain Singh Sambyal OBE
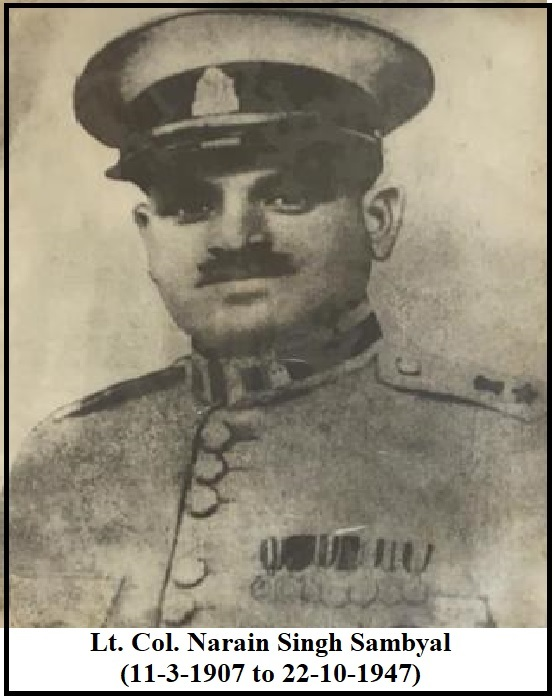

Commander of 4th J&K State Forces
- In office 1924 – 22 October 1947 †
- Monarch: Hari Singh

Personal details
- Born: 14 June 1907 Sangwali Mandi, Samba district, Jammu and Kashmir (Present-day Samba, Samba district, Jammu and Kashmir)
- Died: 22 October 1947 (aged 40) Chattar Domel, Muzaffarabad, Azad Jammu and Kashmir
- Children: 5
- Awards: Order of the British Empire

Military service
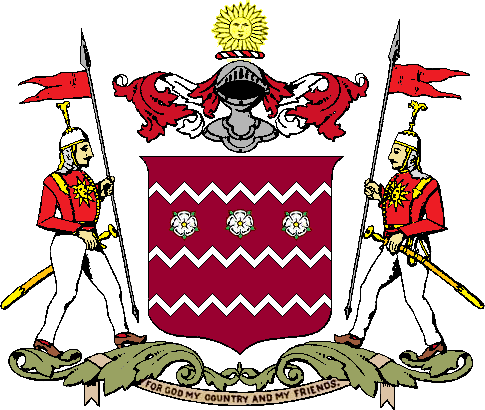
- Allegiance: Jammu and Kashmir
- Branch/service: Jammu and Kashmir State Forces
- Years of service: 1924–1947
- Rank: Colonel
- Battles/wars: Second World War; Kennedy Peak; Defence of Meiktila; Burma campaign; Indo-Pakistani War of 1947

Colonel Narain Singh Sambyal (11 March 1907 – 22 October 1947), also remembered as the Savior of Kashmir, was a Commander of 4th Jammu and Kashmir State Forces who died fighting during the First Kashmir War at Domel Muzaffarabad.

== Indo-Pakistani War of 1947–1948 ==
Invasion of Kashmir
An official report to Maharaja of Kashmir by Divisional Commissioner Dera Ismail Khan in first week of October 1947 warned of an imminent attack on Kashmir due to delay in J&K's accession to India cautioning a safety threat to Muzaffarabad.

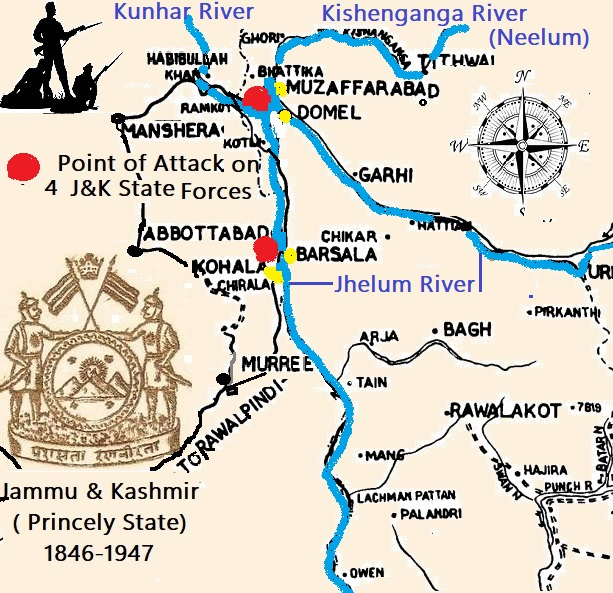
Muzaffarabad is situated on the right bank of River Jhelum adjacent to the border with Pakistan. Opposite to it on the left bank of the river is situated Domel which is linked by road to Muzaffarabad, Loharigali and Ramkot on the Jammu and Kashmir (princely state)’s border and thence to Mansehra and Abbottabad in the North-West Frontier Province of Pakistan through which passed the Rawalpindi-Srinagar road (N-75 National Highway).

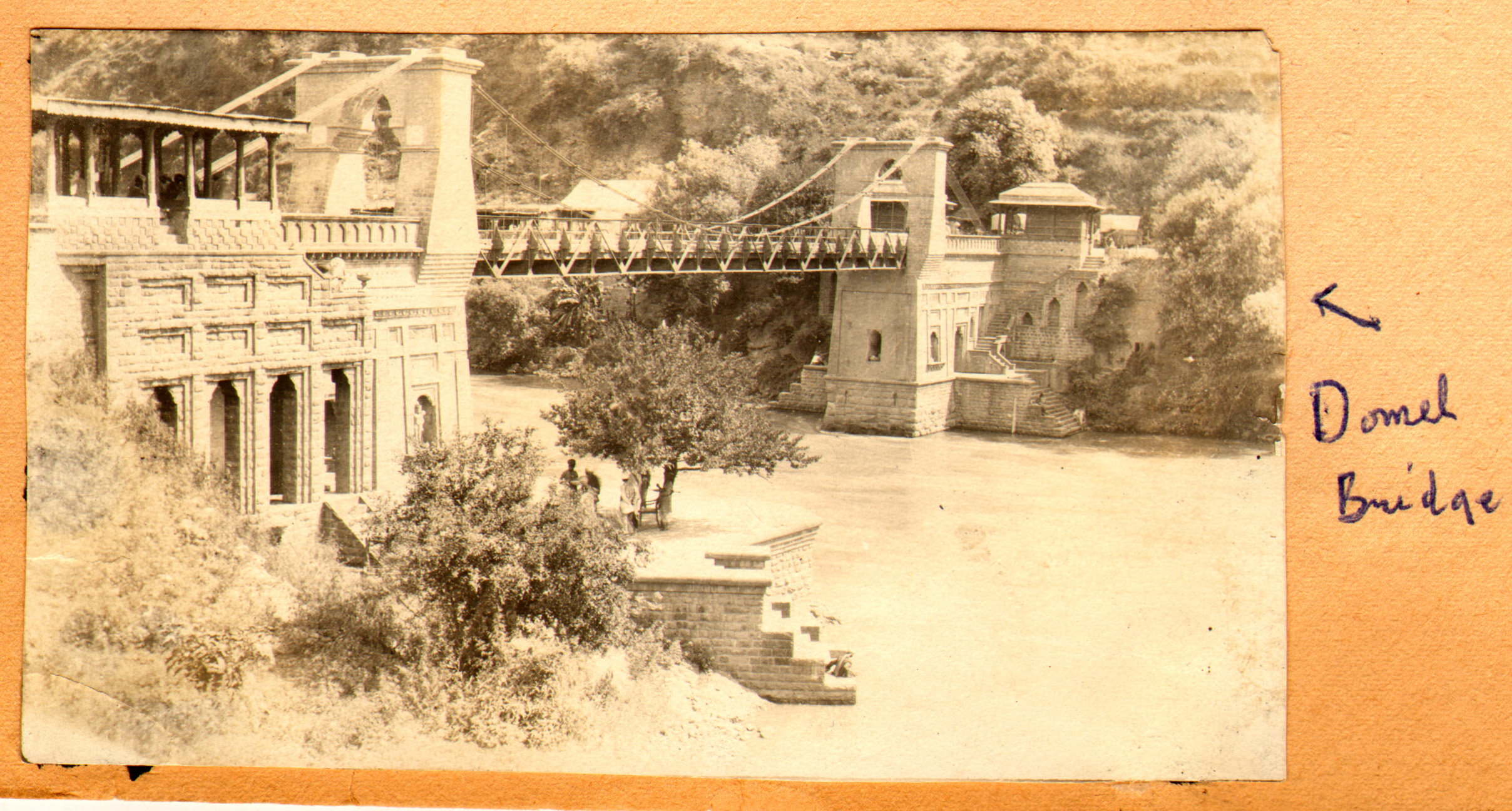
Domel Toll Bridge:In 1947, it was an important customs check post at Domel which yielded revenue of nearly Rs 30,000 a day to the State.

Maharaja responded by deployment of their top most security force 4th J&K State Force commanded by Lt. Col N.S Sambyal in this sector to guard these entrances on the border with Pakistan. Plans were prepared for the demolition of the Kohala Bridge and gaps in Muzaffarabad-Mansehra road by the explosives which were supposed to be arriving from India. On the unfortunate night of 21 October 1947 mixed 4th Battalion of Maharaja swept sides at Loharigali and Ramkot and created chaos within their defensive positions leading to burning of Muzaffarabad and Domel, by twilight the 6000 'qabalis' invaders joined Indian rioters, only the mortar garrison at Domel held their position in which only 15 men survived out of several companies till nightfall of 22 October 1947. On the night of 22 October 1947 Lt. Col Sambyal along with six men took a task to blow up the Kohala bridge 22 mile from Domel, as his jeep was 5 km out of Domel they fell to an enemy ambush, the surviving three Garrison Police Company men narrated the story of Lt. Col. Sambyal's martyrdom on 25 October to Lieutenant Labh Singh, Commander of 'A' Company and Platoon of 'B' company of the 4th Battalion with a detachment of 3" mortars, located at Kohala-Barsala bridge. .

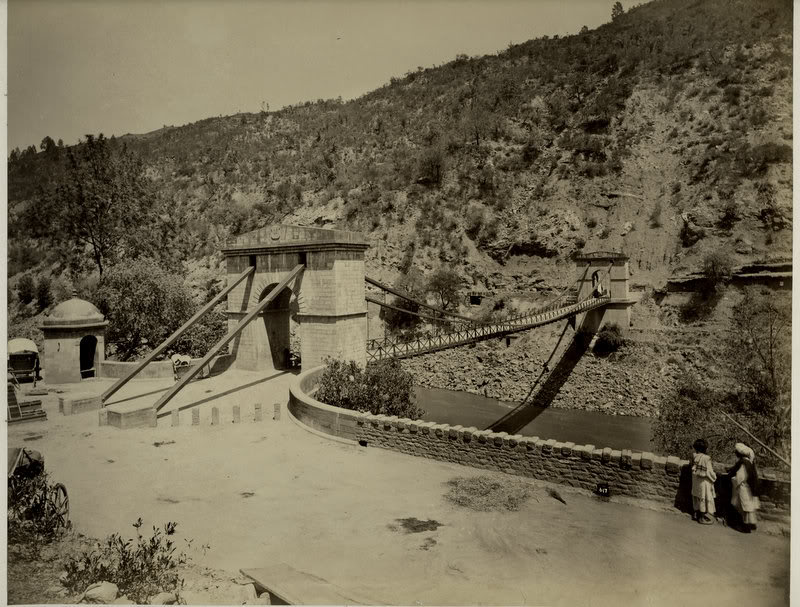
Kohala Bridge :"Gateway of Kashmir" was opened in 1889 for Jhelum Valley Cart Road linking Kohala to Boniyar Baramulla. In 1897 it was extended to Srinagar (S-2 Strategic Highway linking Kohala to Muzaffarabad).

Fighting bravely for every inch of land, Lt. Col Sambyal delayed enemy advance by two crucial days during which important decisions were taken. Rajinder Singh (brigadier) was alerted and defensive actions were taken on the Kohala-Boniyar Jehlum Cart Road to delay enemies. The Indian Army joined the fight and the J&K State was thus saved for India.

== Military career ==
Narain Singh Sambyal passed from High School Samba and was commissioned at the age of 21 in 7th Jammu and Kashmir State Forces as a Second Lieutenant on 14 June 1924, passed Staff College Quetta in 1939, became Commander of 4th Jammu and Kashmir State Forces on 7 January 1944, known to be the oldest Battalion of the State Force as Jammu & Kashmir Infantry (Fateh Shibji) of World War II fame. He was the first Indian to receive the honour by the Viceroy of India, who recommended him for the appointment to the Order of the British Empire of the United Kingdom which he received in 1946 for his role during World War Two at Burma. His regiment excelled in victory over Japanese at Kennedy Peak, Defence of Meiktila, Burma 1942–45.

== Prelude to the Events ==
Operation Gulmarg
As per Indian military sources, by 20 August 1947 the Pakistani Army prepared a plan called Operation Gulmarg without political leadership and issued orders via demi-official letters to various brigade headquarters in the North-West Pakistan to operationalise the plan. According to the plan, 20 lashkars or qabalis (tribal militias), consisting of 1000 Pashtun tribesmen each, were to be recruited and armed at various brigade headquarters in the North-West Pakistan. Ten lashkars were to be launched into the Kashmir Valley via Muzaffarabad and another ten lashkars were to join the rebels in Poonch, Bhimber and Rawalakot with a view to advance to Jammu. The plan also consisted of detailed arrangements for the military leadership and armaments. The regimental records of British India shows that, by the last week of August, the Prince Albert Victor's Own Cavalry (PAVO Cavalry) regiment was briefed about the invasion plan by Colonel Sher Khan, the Director of Military Intelligence, Colonel Akbar Khan and Colonel Khanzadah The involvement of British officers is also narrated by Lieutenant Labh Singh of 4th J&K State Forces who was told to surrender all their weapons other than personal arms by two British officers, a Brigadier and a Lieutenant Colonel of the Pakistani Army on 24 October 1947 at 1700 hours at Kohala bridge so that they could be repatriated to India via Rawalpindi, Pakistan. Instead Labh Singh's company chose to retreat to India along with refugees and reached Bagh at 1430 hours on 31 October 1947, after a seven-day grueling and harrowing experience.

== Bibliography ==
- Effendi, Col. M. Y. (2007), Punjab Cavalry: Evolution, Role, Organization and Tactical Doctrine 11 Cavalry, Frontier Force, 1849-1971, Karachi: Oxford University Press, ISBN 978-0-19-547203-5
- "Honourpoint".
- Joshi, Manoj (2008), Kashmir, 1947–1965: A Story Retold, India Research Press, ISBN 978-81-87943-52-5
- Kalkat, Onkar S. (1983), The Far-flung Frontiers, Allied Publishers
- Prasad, Sri Nandan; Pal, Dharm (1987), Operations in Jammu & Kashmir, 1947-48, History Division, Ministry of Defence, Government of India
- Palit, Major General D.K. (1972), Jammu and Kashmir Arms History of the J&K Rifles, Palit & Dutt, Publishers Dehradun
- Prasad, Shankar (2005), The Gallant Dogras: An Illustrated History of the Dogra Regiment, Lancer Publishers with the Dogra Regimental Centre, ISBN 9788170622680
- Singh, Major (Retd.) Dr. K. Brahma (1991), history-of-jammu-and-kashmir-rifles-1820-1956, Lancer International, ISBN 9788170620914Saviour
- Jamwal, Major General (Retd.)Goverdhan Singh (2021), Valour & Betrayal, Sabre & Quill Publishers, ISBN 9789391970024
