= Soyat Kalan =

- Town
- Nickname: Soyat
- Location in Madhya Pradesh, India
- Coordinates: 24°11′19″N 76°10′40″E
- Country: India
- State: Madhya Pradesh
- District: Agar Malwa district

Population (2001)
  - Total: 13,576

Languages
  - Official: Hindi
- Time zone: UTC+5:30 (IST)
- PIN: 465449
- Telephone code: 07361
- Vehicle registration: MP 70
- Sex ratio: 1000/944 ♂/♀

Soyat Kalan, also known as Soyat, is a town and a Nagar Parishad in the Agar Malwa district of the Indian state of Madhya Pradesh. It also serves as a tehsil headquarters within the district.

The town is situated on the Indore–Kota highway, along the banks of the Kanthal River and the Kali Sindh River. Geographically, it is bordered on three sides by the state of Rajasthan, and functions as a regional hub for transportation and trade between Madhya Pradesh and Rajasthan.

== Demographics ==
As of 2011 India census, Soyat Kalan had a population of 14,781. Males constitute 51% of the population and females 49%. Soyat Kalan has an average literacy rate of 62%: male literacy is 79%, and female literacy is 51%. In Soyat Kalan, 16% of the population is under 6 years of age.

Soyat Kalan is drained by Kanthyal and Kalisindh rivers.

== Educational Institutes ==
There are number of educational institutions in Soyat, such as Government College, Soyat, and a Government Boys and Government Girls schools.

== Religion ==
With more than a hundred Hindu temples, Soyatkalan has been famous in the local area for many years. Some of the most famous temples in town are Chausath Yogini Mandir, Banke Bihari Temple, Radha Krishna Mandir badi Khedi, Raman Bihari, Shri Ram Temple, Maa Ashapurana Mandir Patti Rawla, Narsingh Mandir, Baba Ramdev Mandir, Bada Ganpati Mandir, Lakhabir Mandir, Bavari Temple, Gayatri Temple, Balaji Temple, Narmadeshwar Temple, Dhola Khedi Temple, Panchmukhi Temple, and Vishwakarma Temple. Chausath Yogini Temple is said to be one of the three oldest Chausath Mata temples of India. Soyat also has some mosques for its Muslim population, the biggest of which is Jama Masjid on Patti Road.

== Nearby towns and cities ==
- Jhalrapatan – 41 km
- Jhalawar – 43 km
- Agar – 60 km
- Ujjain – 120 km
- Kota – 135 km
- Indore − 180 km
- Jaipur – 300 km
- Bhopal – 225 km

== Nearby villages ==
Soyatkalan is surrounded by many cities and villages. There are more than 100 villages around Soyat. The main villages among them are lohariya,Salyakhedi, Dongargaon, Dehriya, Dharonia, Nishania, Khedi, Dhanoda, Jiriyakhedi, Goghatpur, Kanthaliya, Kanthaliya Kheda, Soyat Khurd, and Guradiya.

== Kali Sindh Basin ==
The Kali Sindh Basin stretches between the southern and northern limits of the district. It occupies the major parts of Susner and Shajapur Tehsils and a very small part of Agar Tehsil. The southern part of the region is hilly whereas the northern part is plain. The hills gradually decrease in height from south to north. There are a few scattered hillocks in the central and northern parts also. The altitude of the region varies between 450 and 528 metres above mean sea level. Numerous streams originate from the hilly area and dissect the surface. Kali Sindh is the main river, which traverses the hills and flows further on the eastern border of the district. Lakundar is the main rivulets of Kali Sindh that flows northwards. Geologically, the entire region is a part of the Deccan Trap of the Cretaceous Eocene period. Its main tributary, Kanthal River, is the largest source of water in Soyatkalan.

== Language ==
The main languages spoken in Soyatkalan are Hindi, Malwi, and Rajasthani.
