= Gopal Parmar =

Indian politician

Gopal Parmar is an Indian politician and member of the Bharatiya Janata Party. Parmar was a member of the Madhya Pradesh Legislative Assembly from the Agar constituency in Agar Malwa district for two terms. He fought and won the 1993 election and the 2014 by-election for the Agar seat.
