= Rawli =

Village in Madhya Pradesh, India

Coordinates: 24°10′53″N 76°12′09″E

Rawli is a place situated in Agar Malwa district of Madhya Pradesh, India. As per the 2011 census of India, the village has a population of 317, with 177 males and 140 females.
