= Soyat Khurd =

- Village
- Location in Madhya Pradesh, India
- Coordinates: 24.1215709°N 76.2029529°E
- Country: India
- State: Madhya Pradesh
- District: Agar Malwa
- Time zone: UTC+5:30 (IST)

Soyat Khurd is a village in the Shajapur district of Madhya Pradesh. Soyat Khurd village with population of 8608 members is located in Agar Malwa district of Madhya Pradesh state. The village is about 26.33 square kilometer in total area. It is located near the town of Soyat Kalan.

== History ==
The village of Soyat Khurd is situated in Susner tehsil under Shajapur district in the state of Madhya Pradesh.

== Economy ==
Soyatkhurd is depended on Soyatkalan town for major economic activities, which is 10 km away.
