= Kohala Bridge =

Kohala Bridge کوہالہ پل
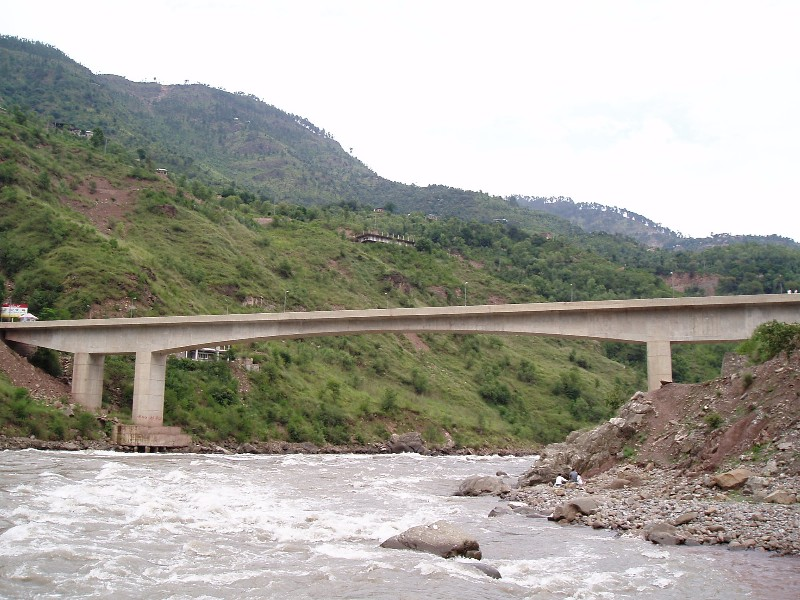
- Coordinates: 34.096115933871666°N 73.49902123326198°E
- Carries: E75 expressway
- Crosses: River Jhelum
- Locale: Kohala

Characteristics
- No. of lanes: 2

The Kohala Bridge is a bridge across the Jhelum River, a tributary of the Indus River, that forms part of one of the land routes from the Azad Kashmir to Punjab in Pakistan. It is located on the E75 expressway.

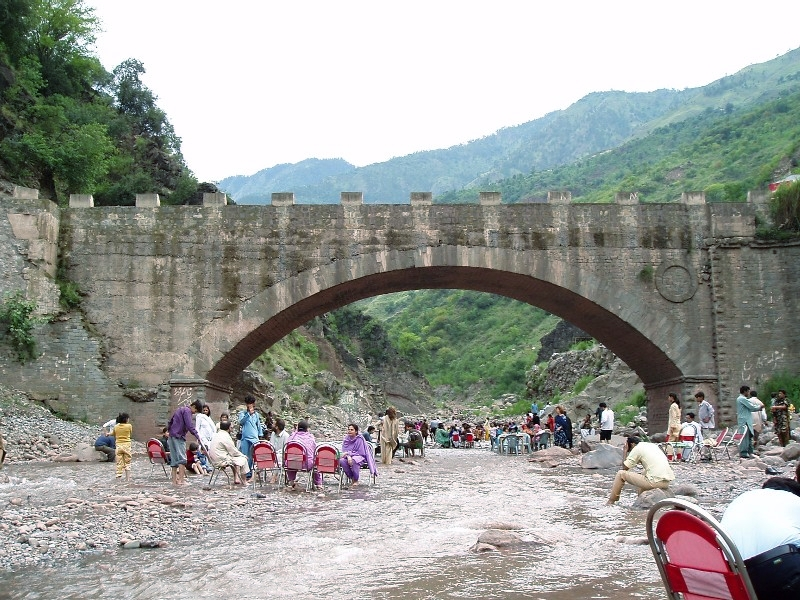
Historical Kohala Bridge

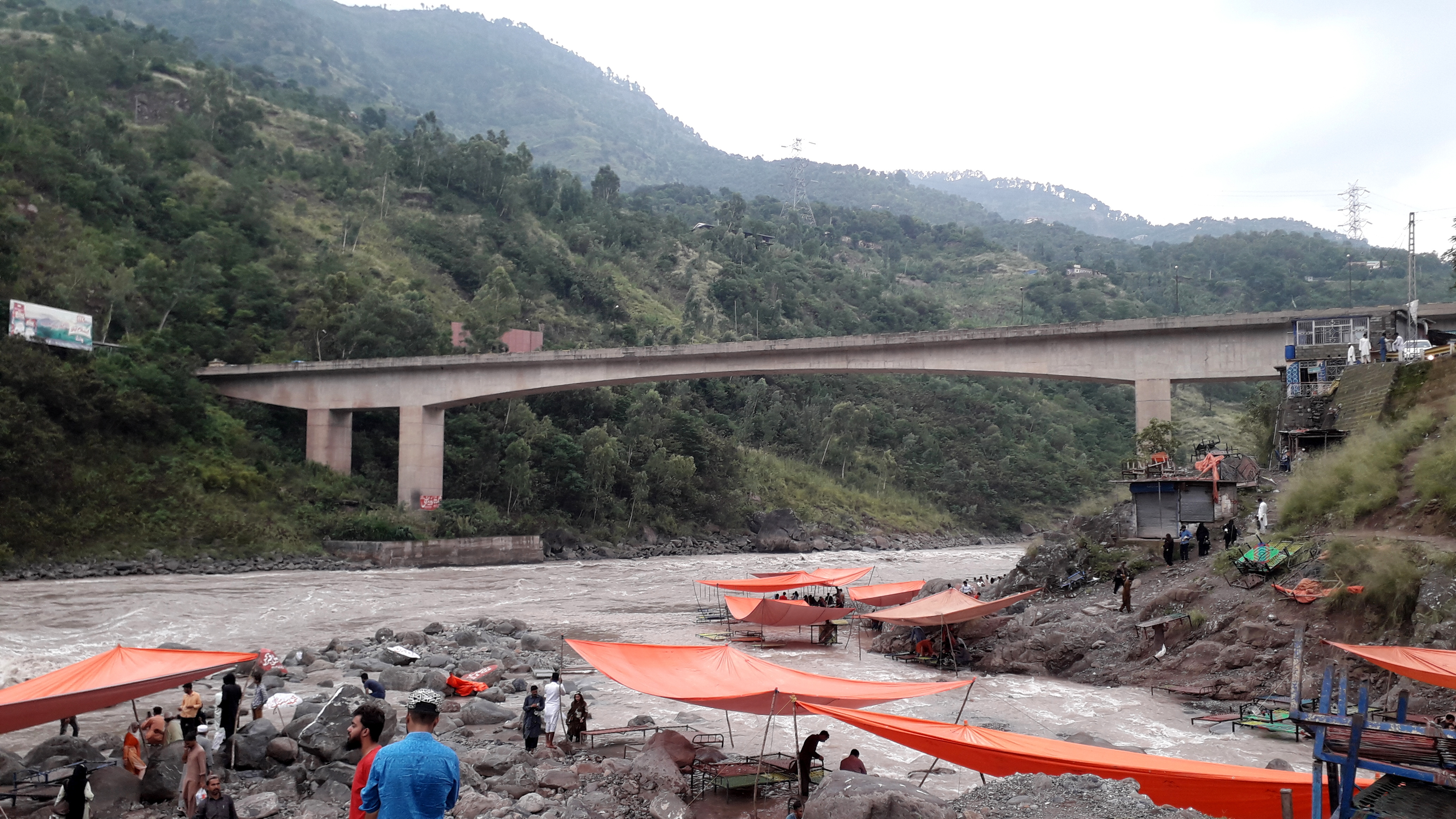
Kohala Bridge, Azad Kashmir, Pakistan

The bridge is located in the town of Kohala, 38 kilometres (24 mi) north of Murree and 35 km south of Muzaffarabad. A bridge was constructed in 1877 and destroyed in an 1890 flood. A new transportable steel bridge was constructed in 1899, and in 1990 it too was swept away in a flood. A third bridge was constructed on the north edge of Union Council Birote Kalan, Abbottabad District, in 1993.
