= Rekha Ratnakar =

Indian politician

Rekha Ratnakar is an Indian politician and member of the Bharatiya Janata Party. Ratnakar was a member of the Madhya Pradesh Legislative Assembly from the Agar constituency in Agar Malwa district.
