= Agar, Madhya Pradesh =

Agar Malwa
- Town
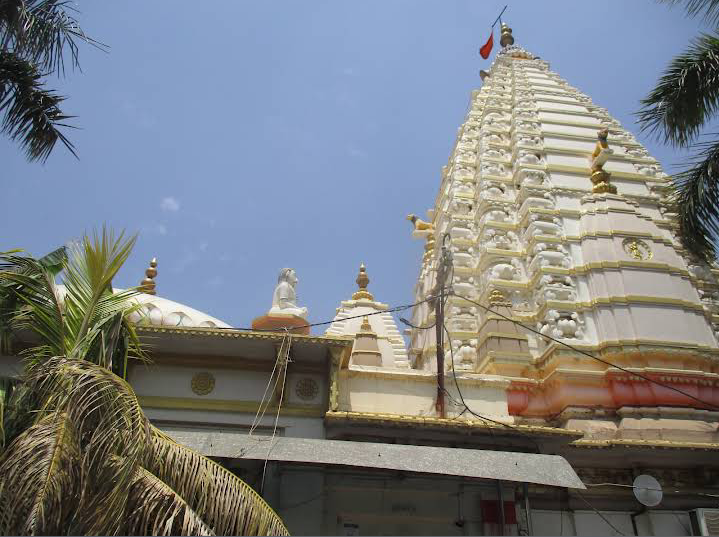
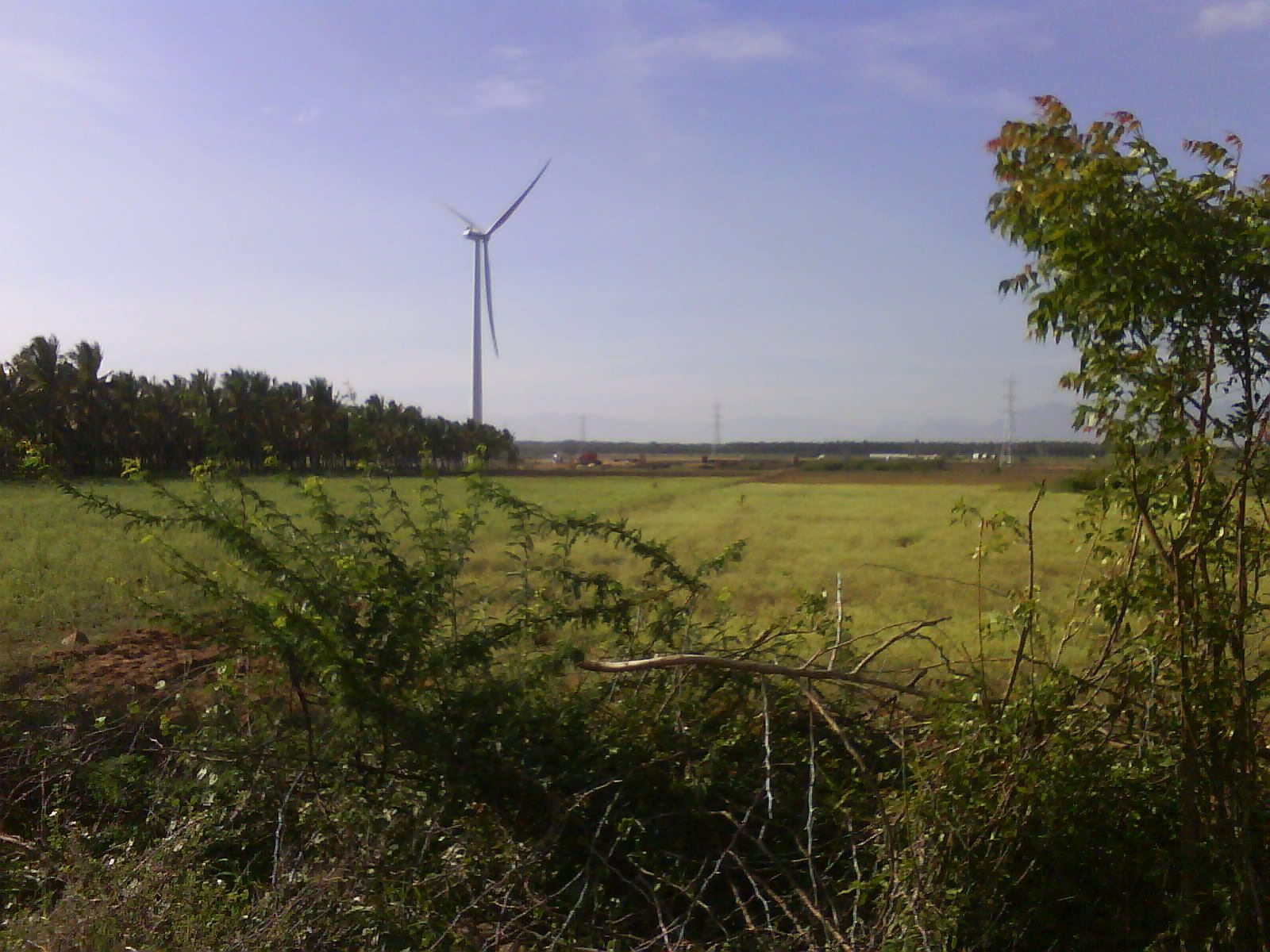
- Baba Baidhnath Mandir, Windmill near Agar

- Location in Madhya Pradesh, India Agar Malwa (India)
- Coordinates: 23°42′59″N 76°00′59″E
- Country: India
- State: Madhya Pradesh
- District: Agar Malwa
- Elevation: 505 m (1,657 ft)

Population (2011)
  - Total: 37,950

Languages
  - Official: Hindi, Malwi
- Time zone: UTC+5:30 (IST)
- PIN: 465441
- ISO 3166 code: IN-MP
- Vehicle registration: MP-70
- Nearest city: Ujjain, Indore, Mandsaur, Jhalawar, Dewas
- Literacy: 99%
- Lok Sabha constituency: Dewas-Shajapur
- Website: agarmalwa.nic.in

Agar is a town with a municipal government in the state of Madhya Pradesh, India. It is the administrative headquarters for the Agar Malwa District which was formed in 2013 from a part of Shajapur District. The town is situated along the Ujjain—Kota SH-27 highway.

== Geography ==
Agar is located on 23°42′59″N 76°00′59″E. It has an average elevation of 505 metres (1657 feet).

Agar is located near Rajasthan and Madhya Pradesh border and on major route of indore -ujjain-kota highway. It's situated in Malwa Region. The region is predominantly agrarian.

== History ==
As per earlier history, one King Agria Bhil founded Agar in the 10th century, Bejnath Mahadev Temple was built by Raja Agariya Bhil. . But after seizing it, Jahala Rajputs ruled it to the 18th century. Then it was passed on to the Panwars of Dhar and then to the Scindia. Agar was the capital of the Parmar Kingdom during the 10th century along with Avantika (Ujjain), then it was the most popular visiting place of Mughal kingdom when Mandu was its capital. The Mughals liked to spend summer vacations there because the temperature during summer nights was very low compared to other areas in the region. During the Sindhia state a number of palaces were built which today are used for city court and for other government offices.

In 1932, 68.9 kilometres (42.8 mi)long Agar–Ujjain section was opened by Gwalior light railways. But constant losses up to 1997 made Ujjain-Agar Line getting abandoned & scrapped by 1999.

== Demographics ==
As of the 2011 Census of India, Agar had a population of 37,917 spread over7,349 households. Males constituted 51.7% of the population and females 48.3%. Agar had an average literacy rate of 80.3%. 13.9% of the population is under 6 years of age.

== Government ==
Agar is part of Agar Assembly constituency. Agar is one of the 230 assembly constituencies of Madhya Pradesh a central Indian state. Agar is a segment of Dewas Lok Sabha constituency. Madhav Singh Is Current MLA from here.

== Tourism ==
Baba Baijnath Temple, Agar -Agar is a tourist attraction, famous for the temple of Jai Baba Baijnath, which was built by the wife of a British Lt. Colonel after a battle in Afghanistan in 1879 where his life was miraculously saved, allegedly, by Lord Shiva's intervention.

The city has two lakes, Moti Sagar (Bada Talab) and Ratna Sagar (Ratodia Talab), which account for the large amount of water in the city. There is also a dam on the Kali Sindh River, the Parsukheri dam; two other dams are Pipliya Kumar dam and Tillar dam.

Some notable areas are the Gufa Barda (Tulja Bhawani mandir), Kewada Swami (Kal Bhairav mandir), Kamal Kundi, Ganesh Temple (Nr.Bada Talab) and Bade Ganeshji, Tulja Bhawani Mandir, Ranchod Mandir, and Gopal Mandir.

A temple of Lord Krishna (also known as Haveli), which has been served by a Hindu Kayastha family for around four hundred years, is also very famous among the locals.

Agar is famous for its red soil. This red soil is found only in Agar and limited to about 1–2 km outside of it.

Banyan trees, some of them many, many years old, are found in Agar Malwa.

Agar Malwa is also famous for Sri Rani Sati Dadi Ji's Temple and Chintaharan Ganesh Mandir Temple at Bada Talab. Worshippers throng to the Chintaharan Ganesh Mandir Temple because the deity here is traditionally known as Chintaharan Ganesh, meaning "the assurer of freedom from worldly anxieties". A very old Radha Krishna Mandir of phool Mali pura was now renovated there is a magnificent black statue of Krishna with Radha. The famous temple of Hanuman garhi is also an old akhada of Agar.

== Transport ==
Agar is located on Kota, Ujjain, Indore Road National Highway 552G. it's 65 km away from Ujjain and 120 km away from Indore, Agar is connected by private bus services to all major cities of Madhya Pradesh.
