= S-2 Strategic Highway =

Road in Pakistan

Strategic Highway S–2
- S-2; Kohala-Muzaffarabad Road کوہالہ مظفرآباد شاہراہ

Route information
- Maintained by National Highway Authority
- Length: 40 km (25 mi)
- Existed: 2016–present

Major junctions
- North end: Muzaffarabad
- South end: Kohala

Location
- Country: Pakistan

Highway system
- Roads in Pakistan

Strategic Highway 2 (S-2), or more popularly known as Kohala–Muzaffarabad Road (Urdu / Pahari: کوہالہ مظفرآباد شاہراہ), is a 40 km long strategic highway in Pakistan, linking Kohala with Muzaffarabad in Azad Jammu and Kashmir.

== Route ==
The S-2 serves as a continuation of the E75 expressway, thus connecting the federal capital Islamabad with the Kashmiri capital Muzaffarabad.

== Improvements and upgrades ==
Improvements and upgrades to the road began in 2013 under three packages. They were completed in September 2016 by the National Highway Authority.

- Kohala-Dulai section (at a cost of Rs 2566.30 million)
- Dulai- Muzaffarabad section (at a cost of Rs. 899.00 million)
- Chatter Kalas and Dulai Bridges (at a cost of Rs. 368.96 million)

== See also ==
- National highways of Pakistan
