= Rajinder Singh (brigadier) =

Army officer

Saviour of Kashmir Rajinder Singh MVC (posthumous)
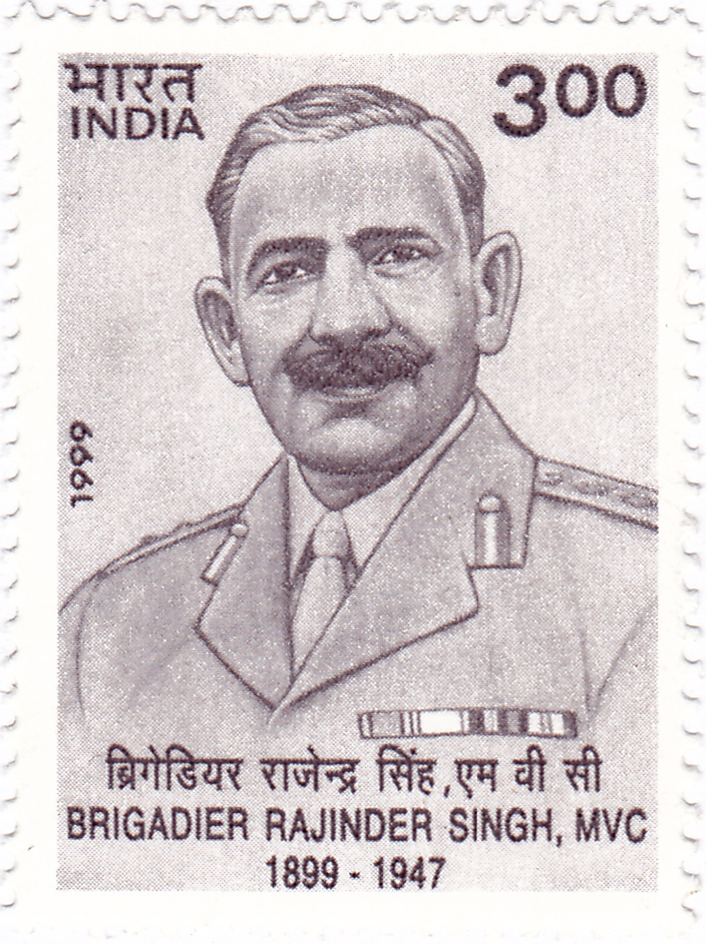

Chief of Military Staff
- In office 25 September 1947 – 27 October 1947 †
- Monarch: Hari Singh
- Prime Minister: Janak Singh, Mehr Chand Mahajan
- Preceded by: Henry Lawrence Scott

Personal details
- Born: 14 June 1899 Bagoona, Jammu district, Jammu and Kashmir (Present-day Rajinderpura, Samba district, Jammu and Kashmir)
- Died: 26/27 October 1947 (aged 48) Boniyar
- Children: 5 daughters; 1 son
- Awards: Maha Vir Chakra

Military service
- Allegiance: Jammu and Kashmir
- Branch/service: Jammu and Kashmir State Forces
- Years of service: 1921–1947
- Rank: Brigadier
- Battles/wars: Indo-Pakistani War of 1947

Brigadier Rajinder Singh Jamwal, MVC (14 June 1899 – 26/27 October 1947), was an Indian general officer, in the Jammu and Kashmir State Forces. He briefly served as the Chief of Staff of State Forces and died fighting during the First Kashmir War. Singh and his small contingent of about 100 men successfully delayed the advance of a 6000 strong force of Pakistani tribal raiders near Uri for several days, during which the Maharaja of Kashmir acceded to India and the Indian forces air-lifted for the defence of Kashmir.

On 30 December 1949, he was posthumously awarded Maha Vir Chakra, independent India’s second highest military decoration. He was the first Indian to receive the honour.

== Early life ==
Rajinder Singh was born on 14 June 1899 in Bagoona village (now Rajinderpura, Samba district) in a military Dogra Rajput family. His ancestor General Baj Singh had died serving under Maharaja Gulab Singh. His grandfather Hamir Singh and father Subedar Lakha Singh were both war veterans. Rajinder Singh was brought up by an uncle, Lt. Colonel Govind Singh, since he was a small child. Singh passed out from Prince of Wales College (now GGM Science College) in Jammu in 1921.

== Military career ==
Rajinder Singh was commissioned on 14 June 1921, in to the Jammu and Kashmir State Forces as a Second Lieutenant. On 25 September 1947, he took over charge as Chief of Army Staff of the Jammu and Kashmir State Forces from Major General H. L. Scott.

=== Indo-Pakistani War of 1947–1948 ===
In September 1947, Pakistan started making preparations for raids into Kashmir, with the aim of capturing Srinagar. On the night of October 21/22, a large number of Pakistani regulars and tribal irregulars gathered near Muzzafarabad. They were successful in instigating the Muslim soldiers of the 4th J&K Battalion of Maharaja Hari Singh's army that was based in the town. The Muslim soldiers rebelled, killing Wazir-e-wazarat Duni Chand Mehta & Col.Narain Singh Sambyal in charge and all the other all Dogra soldiers at the base. This left the 180 km route to Srinagar unguarded, however instead of moving on towards Srinagar, the raiders from Pakistan raided Muzaffarabad. News of the raid only reached the Maharaja the next day. On 22 October 1947, Maharaja Hari Singh gave his Chief of Army Staff, Brigadier Rajinder Singh, the order to defend the state until Indian troops arrived, that he should fight till death in doing so, "save the state till the last man and the last bullet". Karan Singh was present in the room when Hari Singh gave Brigadier Rajinder Singh the command and remembers the incident, "Brigadier Rajinder Singh was given the order by my father and he just saluted and walked away."

With 150-260 (Note: Various sources give different figures between 150 and 260 men: only about 150 men; 150 men; around 200 soldiers; 200; 260 men.) men and officers from Badami Bagh cantonment and nearby establishments, equipped with out-dated weapons (though some accounts add that the Brigadier had two 3-inch mortars and MMGs), and using private vehicles, Brigadier Rajinder left Sringar at 6:30 pm and reached Uri at 2 am on 23 October 1947. Brigadier Rajinder Singh moved on with a small platoon, and after fighting raiders in Garhi, he soon realized that his force was greatly outnumbered against the raiders who also had superior weapons.

On 23 October, Hari Singh sent a command to Brigadier Rajinder Singh through Captain Jwala Singh, "Brigadier Rajinder Singh is commanded to hold the enemy at Uri at all costs and to the last man. Reinforcement is sent with Capt Jwala Singh...". On the night of 23 October Captain Jwala Singh arrived with a small number of reinforcements, consisting of one platoon, one section of MMG; two guns and one section of 3-inch Mortars (two tubes) and Brigadier Rajinder Singh responded by giving first hand situation of front to Maharaja Hari Singh by telephone on 23 October from Baramulla. Brigadier Rajinder Singh ordered the destruction of Uri bridge on 24 October with a 25 pound charge by Subedar Major (Hon. Capt.) Barita Ram Sharma to slow down the raiders. However Rajinder Singh's men had to fall further back to Mahura for another defensive position, reaching Mahura at 10 pm. The defense at Mahura held when the enemy decided to resume the attack on the morning of 25 October. Rajinder Singh, also ordered men to blow up the bridges upstream but before the bridges could be destroyed, some raiders had already crossed over. Rajinder Singh once again ordered his men to fall back, moving them to Rampur near Boniyar, where defensive positions were created throughout the night. On the morning of the 26th the enemy launched another attack. The defence held effectively again, and the raiders movement was again halted. At dusk Brigadier Singh ordered a withdrawal towards Seri close to Baramulla. At 1 am on 27 October the retreating vehicles were attacked at Diwan Mandir, Boniyar, and the convoy halted. The Brigadier's driver was soon killed so the Brigadier drove himself; however soon after he was also mortally wounded. The Brigadier ordered his men to continue ahead with the planned defensive strategy, and leave him where he was. Nothing more was heard of Brigadier Rajinder Singh. His men continued the fight until the next day, but nearly all were killed soon after. However the delay the Brigadier and his men caused the raiders, a delay of nearly 4 days, was enough for diplomatic decisions to be taken and for the Indian Army to arrive.

=== Maha Vir Chakra ===
On 30 December 1949, for his act of gallantry in Jammu and Kashmir, Rajinder Singh was posthumously awarded India's first Maha Vir Chakra. His wife, Ram Dei, received the medal from Army Chief Field Marshal K.M. Cariappa. The citation reads:

Immediately after the partition of the Indian Sub continent in 1947, thousands of raiders assisted by Pakistani regulars invaded the State of Jammu & Kashmir all along its border. The Jammu & Kashmir State Forces, stretched along a 550-mile long border deployed in penn-packets with limited arms, ammunition and supplies, without road communications, and heavily-outnumbered, fought tenaciously holding on to their positions. Kohla-Domel garrison fell to the invaders on 22 October 1947. The fate of the Valley as of the whole State hung precariously on a slender thread.

Brigadier Rajender Singh, Chief of Military Staff, took over the command of a relief column and proceeded to check the raiders. Another column with all available troops (nearly 100) was despatched on 23 Oct 1947 to join Brigadier Rajender Singh with orders from Maharaja Hari Singh, C-in-C as follows:- "Brigadier Rajender Singh is commanded to hold the enemy at Uri at all costs and to the last man. Reinforcement is sent with Capt Jwala Singh ......."

Brigadier Rajender Singh and his band of soldiers carried out the orders of the Maharaja to the letter and spirit. Fighting bravely for every inch of land, they delayed enemy advance by two crucial days during which important decisions were taken. The Indian Army joined the fight and the J&K State was thus saved for India by Brigadier Rajender Singh. He made the supreme sacrifice of his life on 26 October 1947 valiantly fighting the Pakistani raiders in Uri-Rampur sector.

— Gazette Notification: 2 Pres 50, 26.1.50

== Legacy ==
For his valiant rearguard last-stand actions, Brigadier Rajinder Singh is remembered as the "Saviour of Kashmir". V.P. Menon, an Indian civil servant, had said of Brigadier Rajinder:

"He and his colleagues will live in history like gallant Leonidas and his 300 men who held the Persian invaders at Thermopylae. It was but appropriate that when the Maha Vir Chakra decoration was instituted the first award should have been given (posthumously) to this heroic soldier."

Brigadier Rajinder's native hometown of Bagoona has been renamed as Rajinderpura. A park in Bagoona, Samba and Canal head Jammu have been named after Singh, called the "Brigadier Rajinder Singh Memorial Park" and Jammu city has paid tribute by renaming shopping road/street "Rajinder Bazar" in his honor. Both Brigadier Rajinder's birthday, 14 June, and day of martyrdom, 26 October, are celebrated. Locals honour Rajinder Singh's birth anniversary every year in his hometown. On 26 October 2018, the Government of Jammu and Kashmir and the Indian Army paid tributes at 'Brigadier Rajinder Singh Chowk' in Jammu. University of Jammu has an auditorium named after the Brigadier, while two schools in Samba district are also named after the Brigadier.

Sainik Samachar reported that on 24 October 2018 a bust of Brigadier Rajindra Singh, presented by his family, was unveiled at the Badami Bagh Cantonment in Srinagar. Also at Badami Bagh Cantonment is the Rajindra Villa, now the Signal Regiment Officers' Mess. The entrance of the cantonment is also named after Rajinder Singh. Sainik Samachar also reported that the family visited Boniyar to pay homage at the Memorial where Brigadier Rajindra Singh died fighting. Over the years there have been calls to posthumously honour the Brigadier with India's highest gallantry award, the Param Vir Chakra. In 1999, at the Rajinder Singh Pura Memorial, George Fernandes, the then Minister of Defence, had said "I am in agreement [...] that he should have been given PVC".
