= Badod =

Badod Barode (Malwa)
- city
- Location in Madhya Pradesh, India Badod (India)
- Coordinates: 23°47′28″N 75°48′57″E
- Country: India
- State: Madhya Pradesh
- District: Agar Malwa district

Population (2011)
  - Total: 13,834

Languages
  - Official: Hindi
- Time zone: UTC+5:30 (IST)
- Postal code: 465550
- ISO 3166 code: IN-MP
- Vehicle registration: MP70

Badod is a city situated in Agar Malwa district in the state of Madhya Pradesh, India. Badod has tehsil headquarters as well as nagar parishad in Agar Malwa District. Both the Choti Kalisindh and Kachal rivers flow near the town.

== Demographics ==
As of the 2011 Census of India, Badod had a population of 13,834. Males constitute 52% of the population and females 48%. Badod has an average literacy rate of 63%, higher than the national average of 59.5%; with 60% of the males and 40% of females literate. 18% of the population is under 6 years of age.
