= E75 expressway (Pakistan) =

Road in Pakistan

E–75 Expressway
- Murree Expressway مری بزرگراه
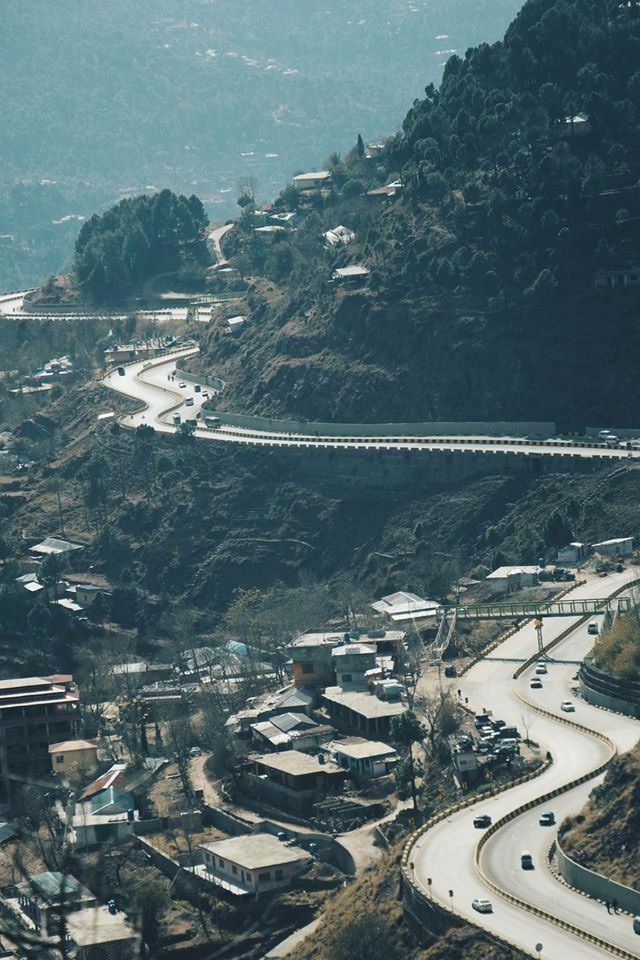

Route information
- Maintained by National Highway Authority
- Length: 90 km (56 mi)
- Existed: 30 August 2011–present

Major junctions
- South end: Islamabad (N75)
- North end: Kohala (S2)

Location
- Country: Pakistan
- Major cities: Murree

Highway system
- Roads in Pakistan

The E-75 Expressway or Murree Expressway (Urdu: مری بزرگراه) (also known as the Islamabad-Murree Expressway) is a four-lane partially operational controlled-access expressway in Pakistan, linking Islamabad to Murree.

The project was planned in 2000 during Pervez Musharraf's government. However, work only started in 2008. It was inaugurated by Prime Minister Yousaf Raza Gillani on 30 August 2011.

== Route ==
The expressway passes through Barakahu, Murree, Phulgran, Upper Topa, Lower Topa, Bhurban, Aliyot, and Phagwari before terminating outside Kohala. The expressway then continues as S-2 Strategic Highway from Kohala to Muzaffarabad.

In July 2026, the government decided to extend the expressway a further 70 kilometers till Muzaffarabad.

== Gallery ==
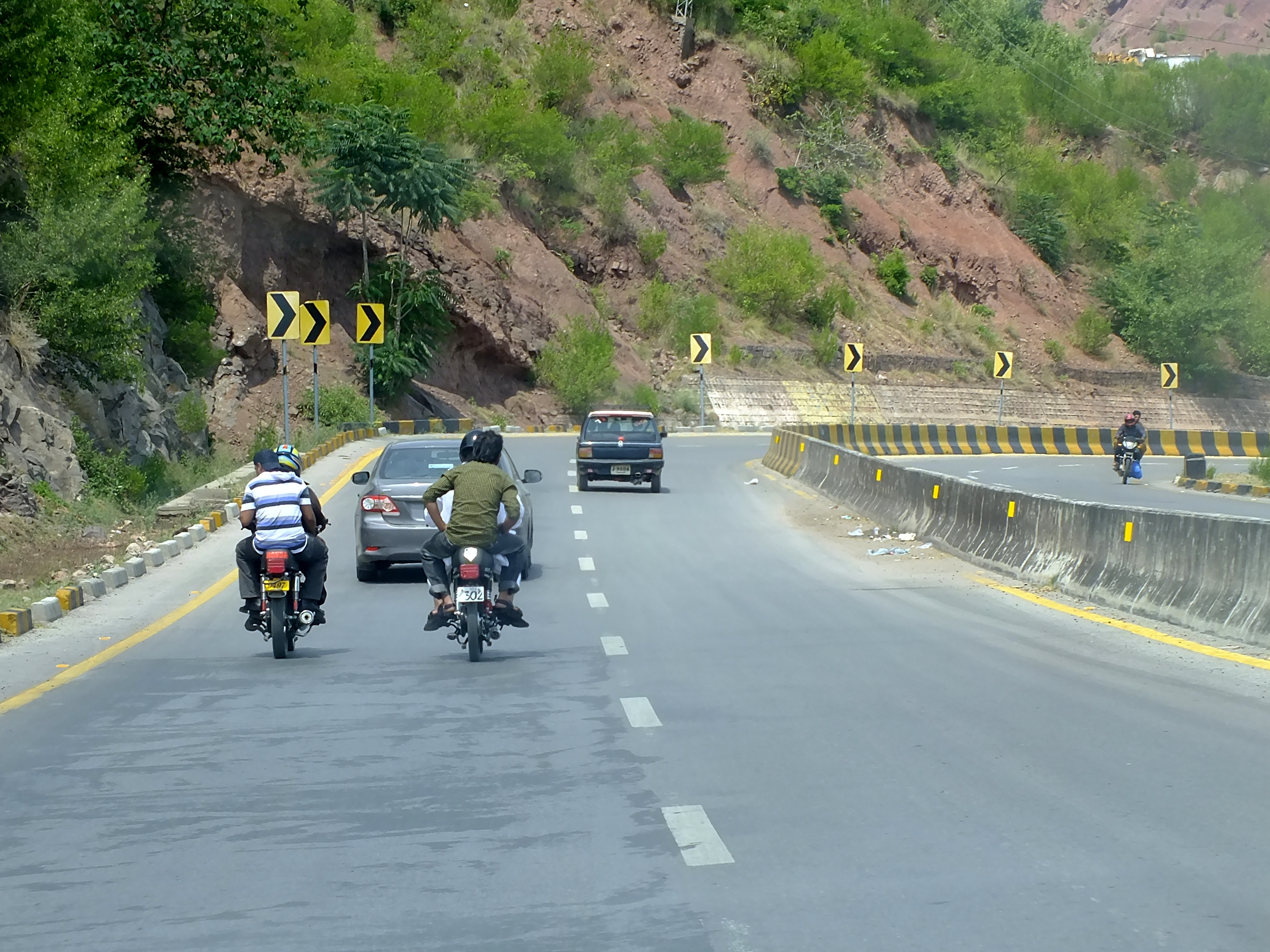
Murree Expressway E-75

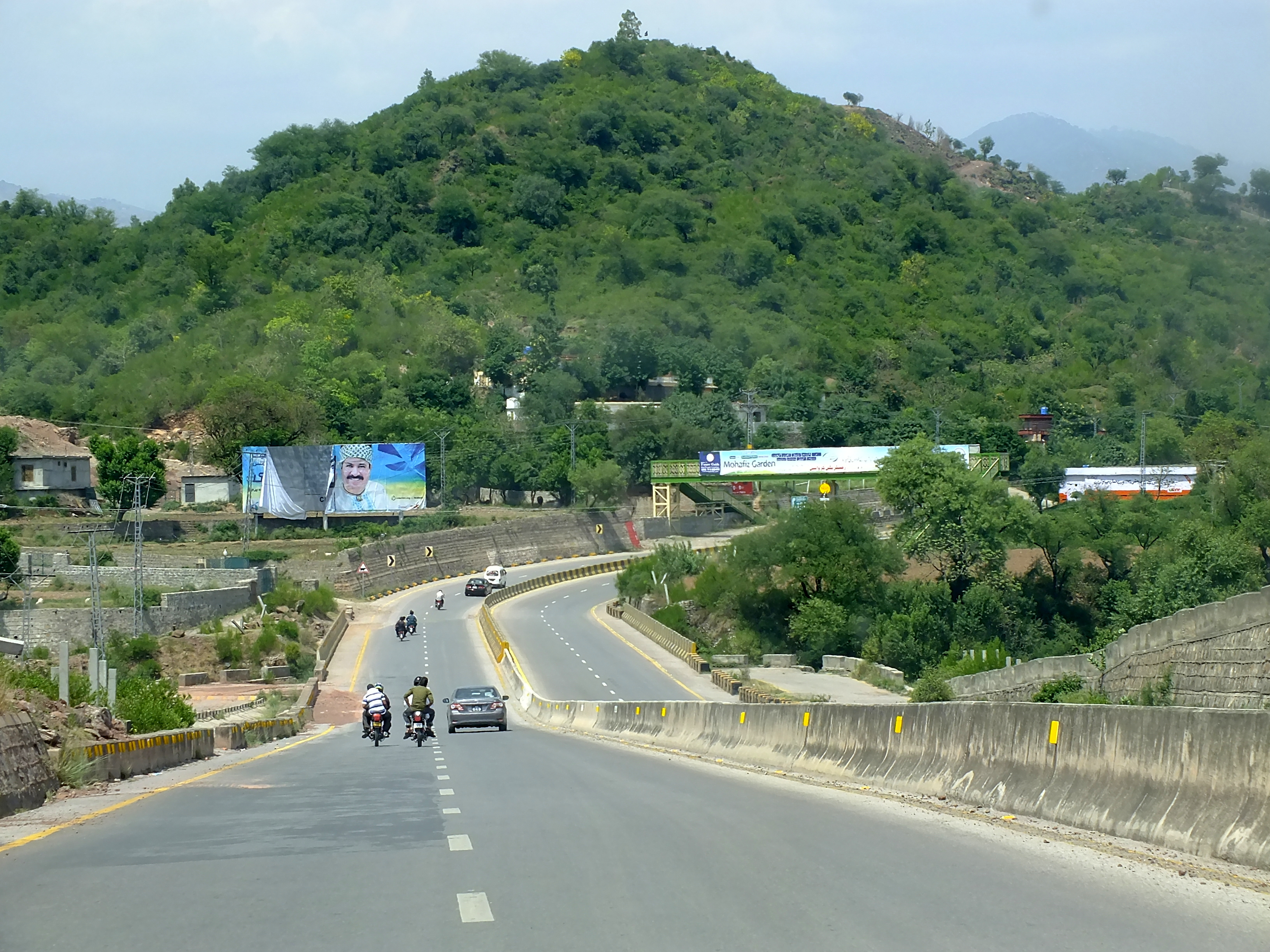
Murree Expressway E-75

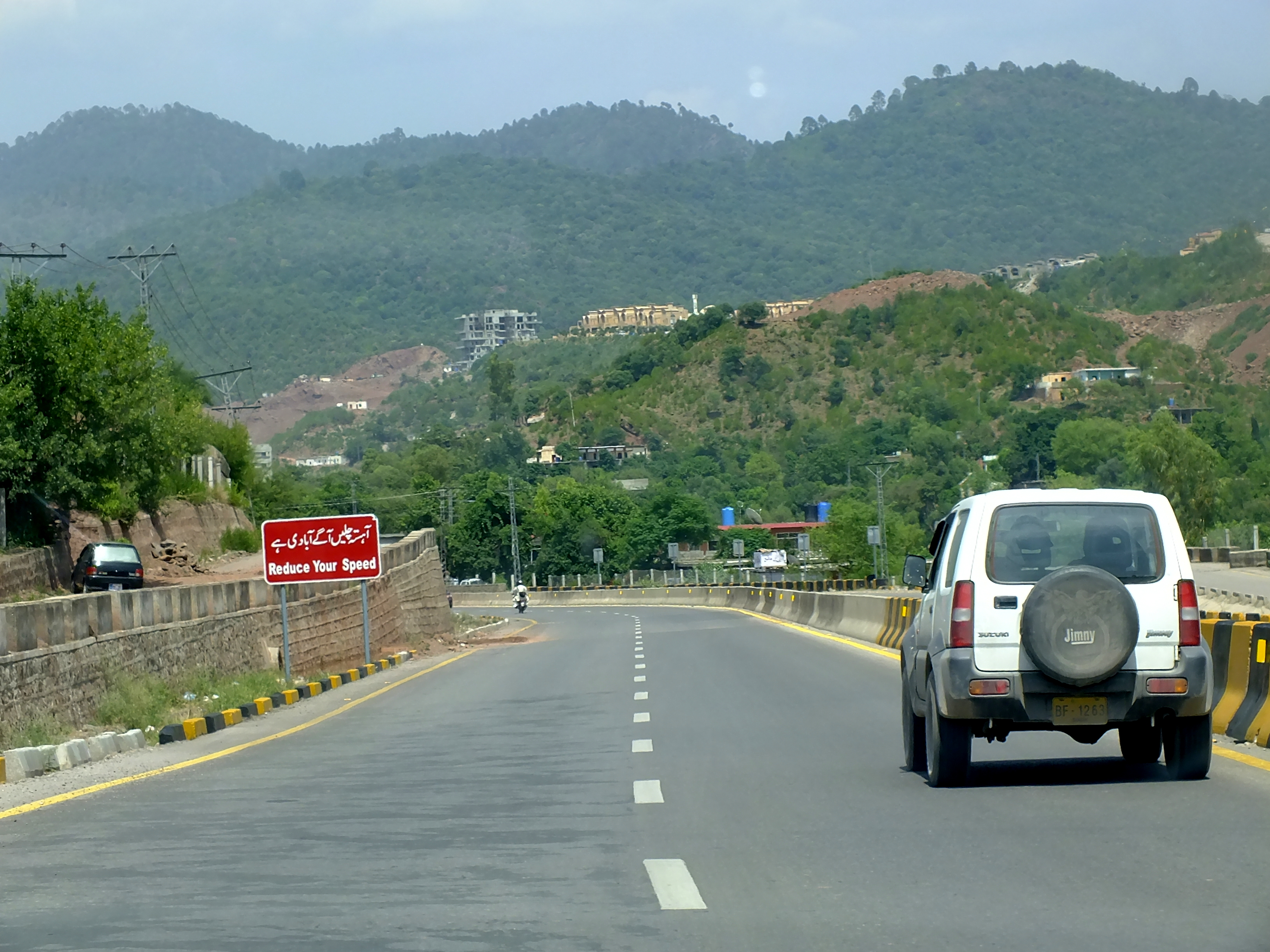
Murree Expressway E-75

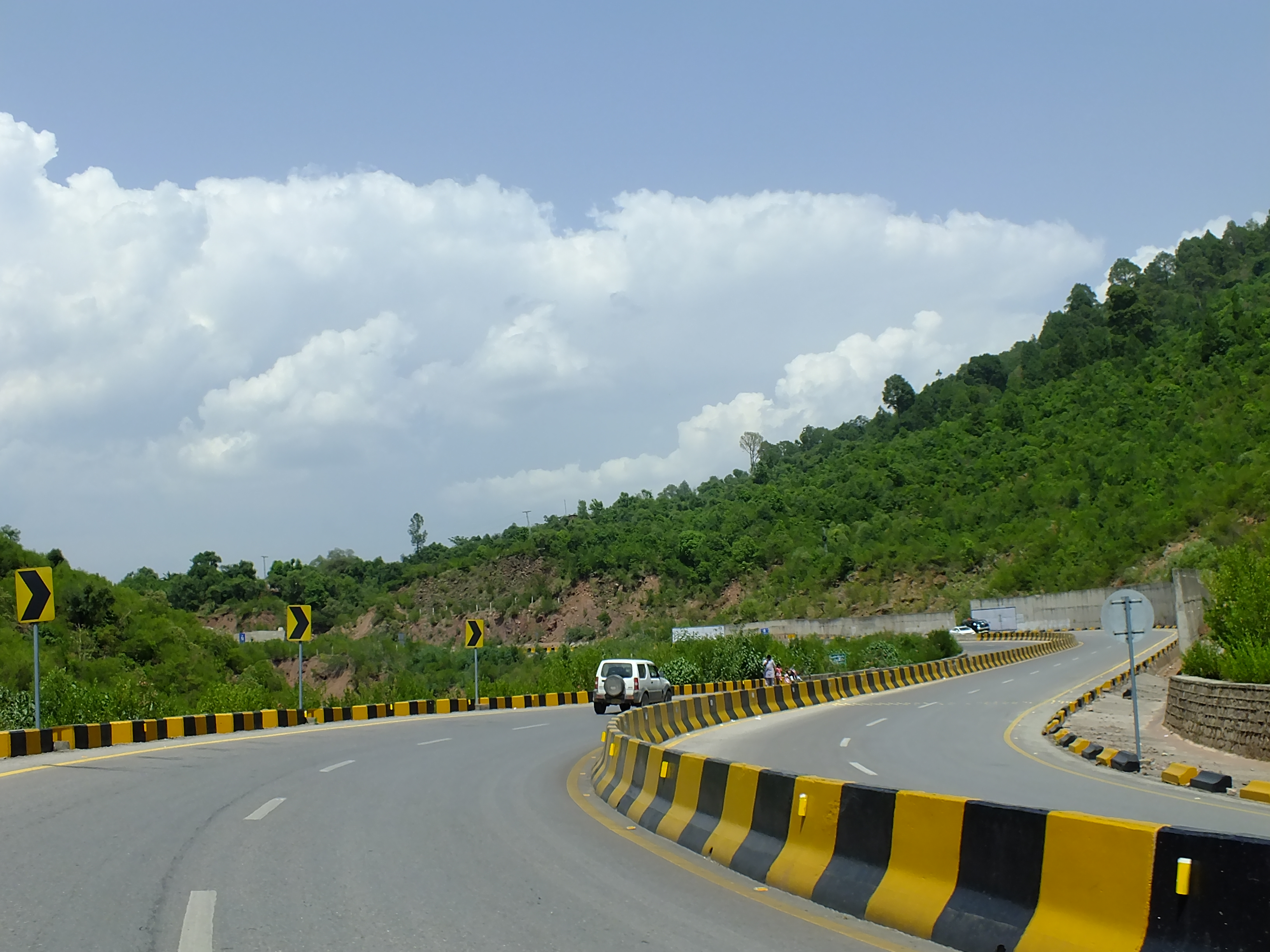
Murree Expressway E-75

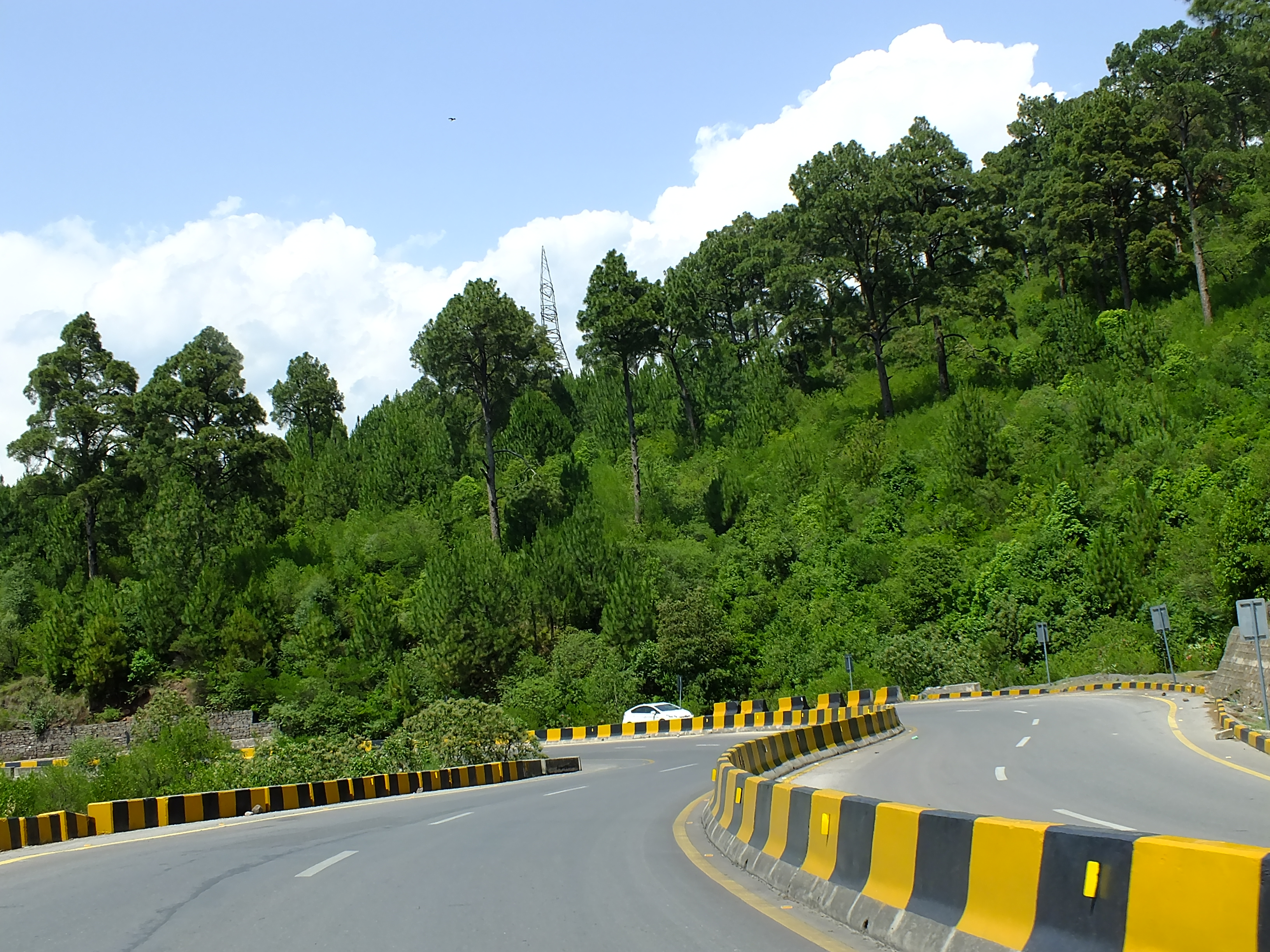
Murree Expressway E-75

== See also ==
- Motorways of Pakistan
- National Highways of Pakistan
- Transport in Pakistan
- National Highway Authority
