= Narain Singh Keshari =

Indian politician

Narain Singh Keshari is an Indian politician and member of the Bharatiya Janata Party. Keshari was a member of the Madhya Pradesh Legislative Assembly from the Agar constituency in Agar Malwa district.
