= Narain Singh Shahbazpuri =

Indian politician

Narain Singh or Narain Singh Shahbazpuri was a politician from Punjab. He was an MLA representing the then Khalra assembly constituency as a member of the Indian National Congress. He was also a member of the now defunct Punjab Legislative Council between 1957 and 1962. He was assassinated by terrorists.
