= Agar Assembly constituency =

Constituency of the Madhya Pradesh legislative assembly in India

Coordinates: 23.72°N 76.01°E

Agar
- Constituency No. 166 for the Madhya Pradesh Legislative Assembly

Constituency details
- Country: India
- Region: Central India
- State: Madhya Pradesh
- District: Agar Malwa
- Lok Sabha constituency: Dewas
- Established: 1957
- Reservation: SC

Member of Legislative Assembly
- 16th Madhya Pradesh Legislative Assembly
- Incumbent Madhav Singh
- Party: Bharatiya Janata Party
- Elected year: 2023
- Preceded by: Vipin Wankhede

Agar is one of the 230 assembly constituencies of Madhya Pradesh a central Indian state. Agar is a segment of Dewas Lok Sabha constituency.

== Members of the Legislative Assembly ==
=== Madhya Bharat Legislative Assembly ===
Election	Name	Party
1952	Sobhagmal Bapulal	Indian National Congress

=== Madhya Pradesh Legislative Assembly ===
Election	Member	Party
1957	Madanlal ji bhandari	Bharatiya Jana Sangh
1962	Madanlal ji bhandari	Bharatiya Jana Sangh
1967	Bhurelal Firozia	Bharatiya Jana Sangh
1972	Madhukar Marmat	Indian National Congress
1977	Satyanarayan Jatiya	Janata Party
1980	Bhurelal Firozia	Bharatiya Janata Party
1985	Shakuntala Bai Chouhan	Bharatiya Janata Party
1990	Narain Singh Keshari	Bharatiya Janata Party
1993	Gopal Parmar	Bharatiya Janata Party
1998	Ramlal Malviya	Indian National Congress
2003	Rekha Ratnakar	Bharatiya Janata Party
2008	Laljiram Malviya	Bharatiya Janata Party
2013	Manohar Untwal	Bharatiya Janata Party
2014^	Gopal Parmar	Bharatiya Janata Party
2018	Manohar Untwal	Bharatiya Janata Party
2020^	Vipin Wankhede	Indian National Congress
2023	Madhav Singh	Bharatiya Janata Party

Bypoll

== Election results ==
=== 2023 ===
2023 Madhya Pradesh Legislative Assembly election: Agar
Party	Candidate	Votes	%	±%
BJP	Madhav Singh	102,176	51.46	+3.93
INC	Vipin Wankhede	89,174	44.91	−3.72
NOTA	None of the above	1,491	0.75	+0.05
Majority		13,002	6.55	+5.45
Turnout		198,573	85.03	+1.09
BJP gain from INC		Swing		

=== 2020 bypoll ===
2020 Madhya Pradesh Legislative Assembly by-elections: Agar
Party	Candidate	Votes	%	±%
INC	Vipin Wankhede	88,716	48.63	+2.39
BJP	Manoj Manohar Utwal	86,718	47.53	−0.16
SS	Manoj Jharbade	1,762	0.97	
NOTA	None of the above	1,279	0.7	−0.55
Majority		1,998	1.10	−0.15
Turnout		182,449	83.94	+0.97
INC gain from BJP		Swing		

=== 2018 ===
2018 Madhya Pradesh Legislative Assembly election: Agar
Party	Candidate	Votes	%	±%
BJP	Manohar Untwal	82,146	47.69	
INC	Vipin Wankhede	79,656	46.24	
AAP	Babulal Malviya	2,039	1.18	
BSP	Govind Suryavanshi	1,978	1.15	
Bahujan Sangharsh Dal	Sunil Tulseeram Astay	1,699	0.99	
NOTA	None of the above	2,160	1.25	
Majority		2,490	1.45	
Turnout		172,255	82.97	

== See also ==
- Agar Malwa district
- Agar
- List of constituencies of the Madhya Pradesh Legislative Assembly
