= N-75 National Highway =

Road in Pakistan

National Highway 75
- قومی شاہراہ ٧٥
- Islamabad - Kohala Highway

Route information
- Maintained by NHA
- Length: 90 km (56 mi)

Major junctions
- North end: Kohala
- South end: Islamabad

Location
- Country: Pakistan
- Major cities: Murree

Highway system
- Roads in Pakistan

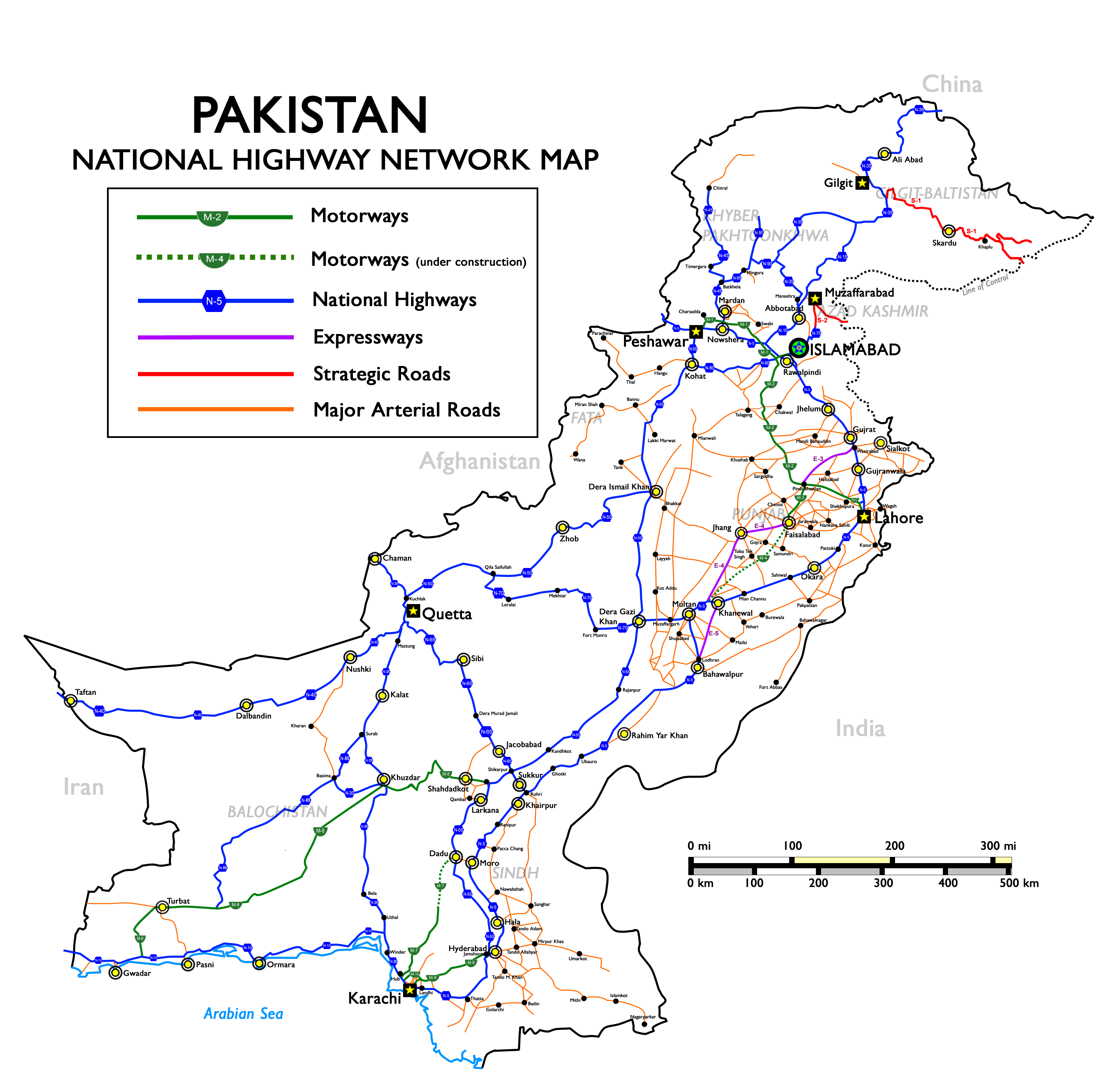
Map of National Highways of Pakistan also indicating N-75

The National Highway 75 (Urdu: قومی شاہراہ ۷۵) or the N-75 is a 90-kilometre-long national highway in Pakistan. It runs from the capital city of Islamabad to the town of Kohala via Murree in Punjab. It is maintained and operated by Pakistan's National Highway Authority.

== See also ==
- Motorways of Pakistan
- Transport in Pakistan
