= Madhav Singh =

Indian politician

Member of the Madhya Pradesh Legislative Assembly
- Incumbent
- Assumed office 2023
- Preceded by: Manohar Untwal
- Constituency: Agar

Personal details
- Political party: Bharatiya Janata Party
- Profession: Politician

Madhav Singh is an Indian politician from Madhya Pradesh. He is a member of the Madhya Pradesh Legislative Assembly from 2023, representing Agar Assembly constituency as a Member of the Bharatiya Janata Party.

== See also ==
- List of chief ministers of Madhya Pradesh
