= Baba Baijnath Temple, Agar =

Coordinates: 23.73°N 76.04°E

Baba Baijnath Temple
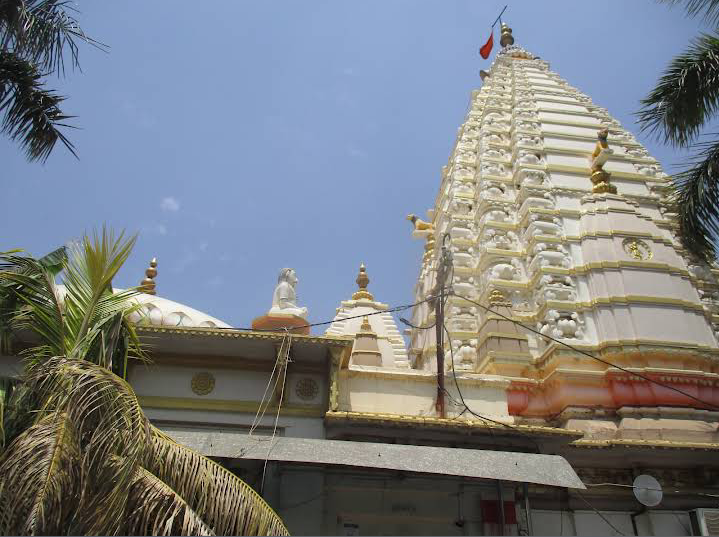
- Temple from outside

- Location in Madhya Pradesh

Religion
- Affiliation: Hinduism
- Festival: Mahashivratri

Location
- Location: Agar
- State: Madhya Pradesh
- Country: India
- Interactive map of Baba Baijnath Temple

Baba Baijnath Temple is a Hindu temple located in Agar, Madhya Pradesh, India. The temple is dedicated to Lord Shiva.

It is believed that the temple was built by a British officer. Several interesting aspects are associated with the temple. The local residents have great faith in the temple, and large gatherings are observed during festivals.
