= Kohala, Pakistan =

Kohala کوہالا
- Town
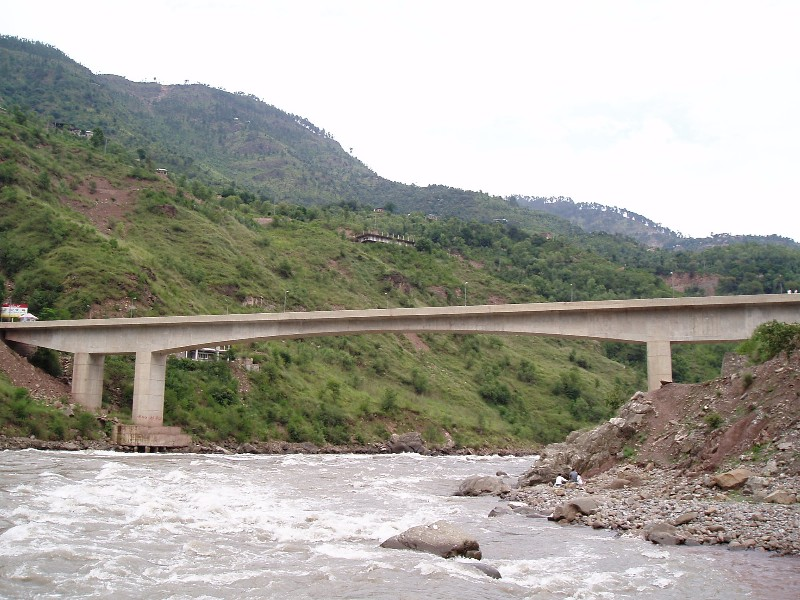
- Kohala Bridge

- Location within Azad Kashmir Location within Pakistan
- Coordinates: 34.0919°N 73.4968°E
- Country: Pakistan
- Province: Punjab
- District: Rawalpindi

Kohala (Urdu: کوہالا) is a town in Pakistan on the River Jhelum, north of Murree, south of Muzaffarabad, and east of Bagh. The town was at the independence of Pakistan in 1947 a border town between newly created Pakistan and the princely state of Jammu and Kashmir, but is today only the border between the rest of Pakistan and Azad Kashmir.

== Location ==
Kohala is the site of the well-known Kohala Bridge, which carries the E75 expressway, across the Jhelum. Kohala is a gateway to the Muzaffarabad and Bagh districts of Azad Kashmir. It lies where the Punjab, Kashmir and Khyber Pakhtunkhwa boundaries meet.

== Etymology ==
There are two theories regarding the etymology of Kohala. One is that it originates from the name of a Hindu goddess Kohala Devi because Kohala was a place where Hindu deities were worshipped on the banks of the Watesta (Jhelum) River before the arrival of Islam. A temple called Dawal was there.

Another theory is that Kohala is derived from the Dhondi/Kareali language kohal, meaning "cattle room" or house that was divided in living room in ancient time or separate or beneath of living house in modern era, or gotrerhi, a place where livestock stay and sit.

Kohala is a place where caravans from Kashmir stayed after crossing Jhelum River and their horses and donkeys were tied there in antiquity. There are two Kohalas in the region; one is on both banks of river Jhelum and a Kohala Bala at Lora, a union council of Abbottabad District.

== History ==
=== Ancient era ===
In ancient times Kohala was a centre of Hindu pilgrimage who worshipped Kohala Devi. By the middle of 500 BCE Kohala had become a centre of the Buddhist community and a temple was constructed between Kohala and Knair Pull. It was a route of Buddhist monks for travelling from Taxila to Sharda Buddhist university in Sharda, Kashmir.

=== 18th century ===
Kohala was possessed by the Karlal tribe in the mid eighteenth century and in 1200 when the Dhond Abbasi tribe attacked, they vacated Bakot and Kohala also. From this time Kohala was under the proprietorship of Birote. When the Mojwal family of the Dhond Abbasi tribe migrated to Bakote by force, the Kohala proprietorship transferred to Mojwals of Bakote.

=== 19th century ===
In the first decade of 1800, Malka Singh, administrator of Rawalpindi captured Kohala by force. In 1814 Malka Singh and the Dogra government of Kashmir under Gulab Singh developed the area as a business centre for Hindu merchants.

=== British era ===
In 1863 Sir James Abbott, the first commissioner of Hazara, changed the name of the area from Patan (the old name) to Kohala.

The British government transferred the administration of Kohala to Murree on a one hundred-year lease in 1873. The Punjab government renewed this lease in 1973 for 20 years and it was reunited with Bakote in 1993.

The government of British India built a rest house in the south of Kohala for high officials with seven drying rooms, two kitchens, one reading room, two toilets and horse and dog barns. The Indian olive, banana, apple and silkworm trees were in the guest house's eastern lawn. Guest house staff consisted of 30 people. A telegraph office (later a post office) was established there in 1880. Allama Iqbal (Poet of the East) staying in this rest house in 1930 and wrote his famous poem "Hammala", the 1st poem of his book Bang-e-Dra here. The bazaar of Kohala was most populated until 1947. Hindu merchants from Dewal, Murree, Rawalpindi and Punch controlled trade between Punjab and Kashmir.

=== After independence ===
In 1947 during the independence of Pakistan Kohala joined Pakistan.
