= Agar Malwa district =

Coordinates: 23.715°N 76.013°E

- District
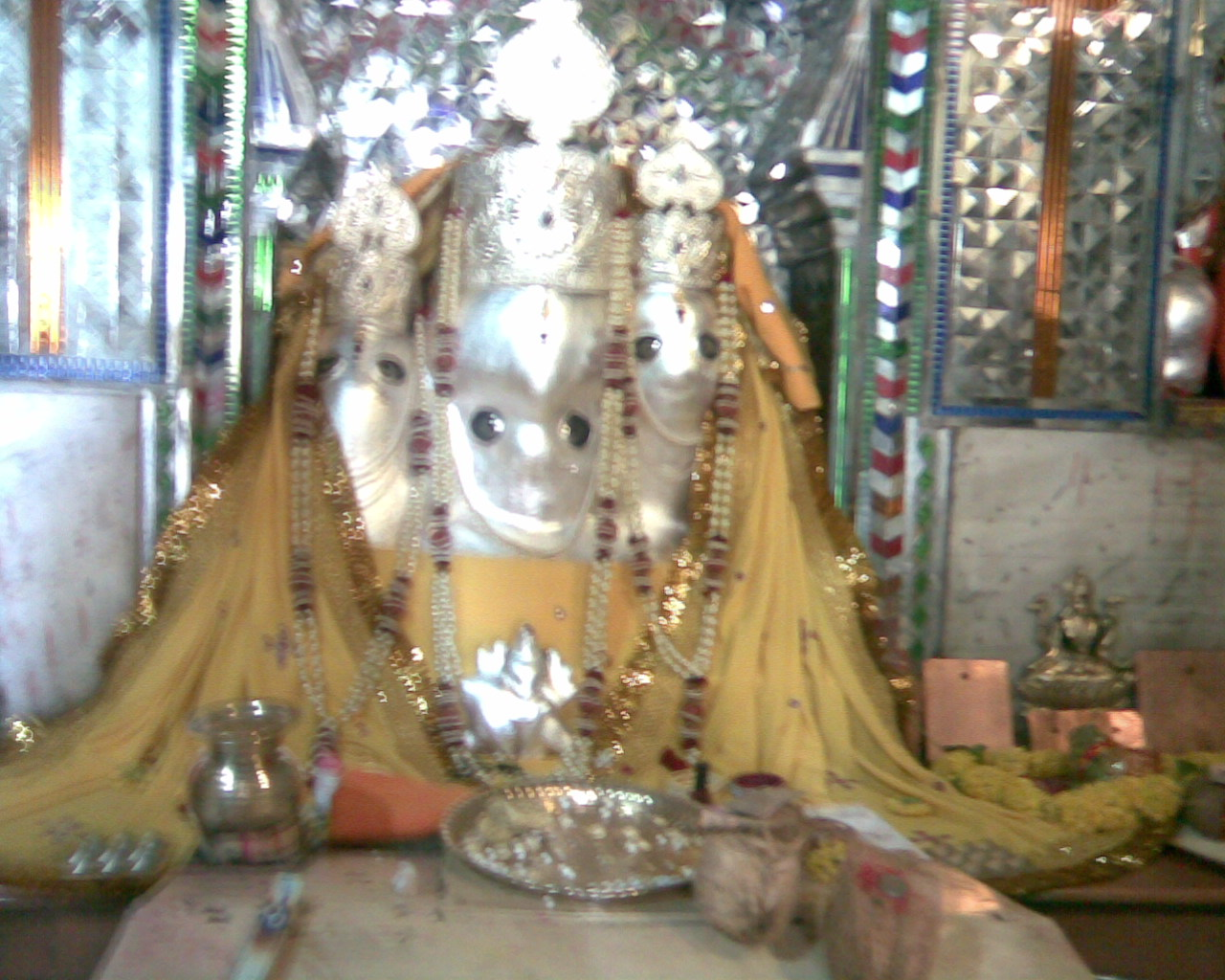
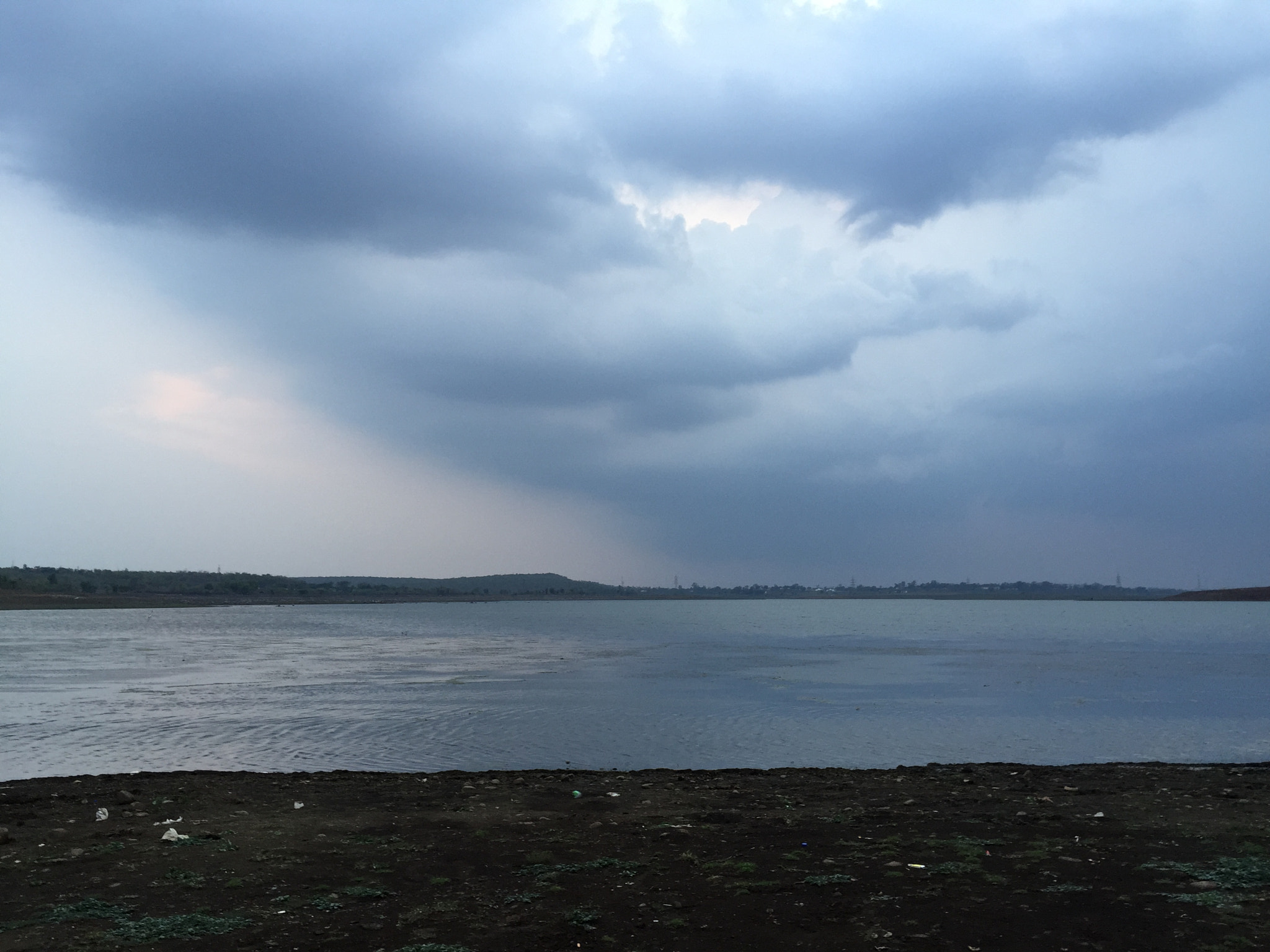
- Baglamukhi Temple in Nalkheda, Motisagar Talab

- Location of Agar-Malwa district in Madhya Pradesh
- Country: India
- State: Madhya Pradesh
- Division: Ujjain
- Headquarters: Agar
- Tehsils: 5: 1. Agar; 2. Badod; 3. Susner; 4. Nalkheda; 5. Soyat Kalan

Government
  - District Magistrate: Awadhesh Sharma IAS

Area
  - Total: 2,785 km^{2} (1,075 sq mi)

Population (2011)
  - Total: 571,278
  - Density: 205.1/km^{2} (531.3/sq mi)

Demographics
  - Literacy: 51%
- Time zone: UTC+05:30 (IST)
- Vehicle registration: MP-70
- Website: agarmalwa.nic.in

Agar Malwa district (Hindi pronunciation: [aːgəɾ maːlʋaː]) is an administrative district in the Indian state of Madhya Pradesh. It was formed in 2013 after being carved out of Shajapur district. The district's administrative headquarters is located in the town of Agar.

== History ==
It was a division during the Sindhia state (some of their palaces are still presently used for city court and for other government offices). It was formerly a cantonment region at the time of India's independence because of the favourable weather and the availability of water. It was a district under the state of Madhya Bharat after the independence of India until 1956. Since 16 August 2013 Agar Malwa has been the 51st district of Madhya Pradesh. The district was formed by removing Agar, Badod, Susner and Nalkheda tehsils from Shajapur District, decreasing its size. It was formerly a cantonment region at the time of India's independence because of the favourable weather and the availability of water. It was a district under the state of Madhya Bharat after the independence of India until 1956. Since 16 August 2013 Agar Malwa has been the 51st district of Madhya Pradesh.

== Geography ==
The western part of the district is marked by the Agar Plateau that covers the major areas of Agar Malwa district. There is a hill tract to the west of the town of Badod, showing scattered hillocks in a north–south direction. The presence of hills in the center has affected the drainage pattern. The height of this tract varies between 500 metres (1,600 ft) and 545 metres (1,788 ft) above the mean sea level and it slopes towards the north.

Dudhaliya and Kachhol are the main streams in the west, originating from the hill tract and draining towards the west. Chhoti Kali Sindh, which is the main perennial stream of the region, flows northwards on the western border of the region.

== Demographics ==
Religions in Agar Malwa district (2011)
Religion	Percent
Hinduism	90.83%
Islam	7.58%
Jainism	1.48%
Other or not stated	0.11%

At the time of the 2011 census, Agar Malwa district had a population of 571,278, of which 117,329 (20.54%) lived in urban areas. Agar Malwa had a sex ratio of 949 females per 1000 males. Scheduled Castes and Scheduled Tribes make up 135,898 (23.79%) and 13,941 (2.44%) of the population respectively.

90.83% of the population were Hindu, 7.58% Muslim, and 1.48% Jain.

Languages of Agar Malwa district (2011)
1. Malvi (53.2%)
2. Hindi (41.4%)
3. Sondwari (4.80%)
4. Others (0.58%)

At the time of the 2011 census, 53.24% of the population spoke Malvi, 41.31% Hindi and 4.80% Sondwari as their first language.

== Government and politics ==
There are two assembly constituencies in the district which are represented by MLAs.

- Agar Assembly constituency
- Susner Assembly constituency

== Administrative divisions ==
Agar Malwa District has two sub-divisions, Agar Malwa division and Susner Division. There are four tehsils:

- Agar Malwa
- Badod
- Susner
- Nalkheda.
- Soyat Kalan

== Places to interest ==
- Bagalamukhi Temple, Nalkheda
- Baba Baijnath Temple, Agar
- Chausath Yogini Temple
- Kevdaswami Bhairavnath Temple
- Maa Tulja Bhawani Temple
- Manshapurn Ganapati Chipiya Gaushala, Agar
- MotiSagar Talab, Agar
- Pacheti Mata Temple
- Someshwar Mahadev Temple

== Education ==
- Saraswati Shishu Mandir, Agar Malwa.
