= Narmada Valley dry deciduous forests =

Ecoregion in India

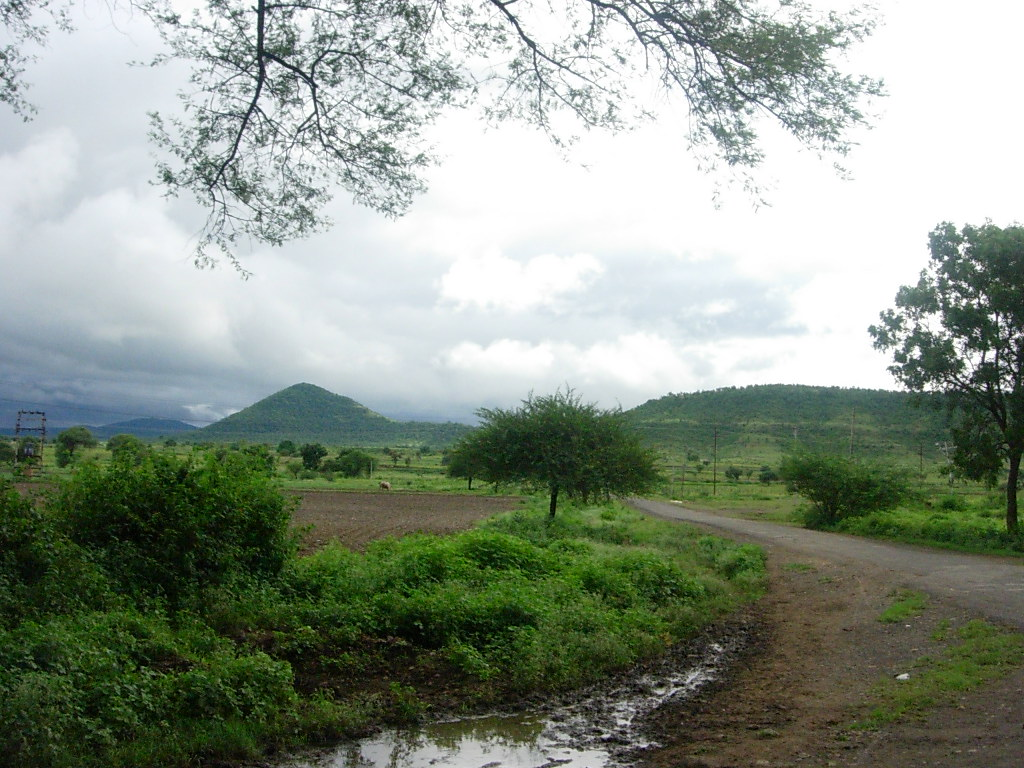
- Indore district, Madhya Pradesh, India

- Map of the Narmada Valley dry deciduous forests (in purple)

Ecology
- Realm: Indomalayan
- Biome: tropical and subtropical dry broadleaf forests
- Borders: List: Central Deccan Plateau dry deciduous forests; Chhota-Nagpur dry deciduous forests; Deccan thorn scrub forests; East Deccan moist deciduous forests; Khathiar-Gir dry deciduous forests; Lower Gangetic Plains moist deciduous forests; North Western Ghats moist deciduous forests; Upper Gangetic Plains moist deciduous forests

Geography
- Area: 169,456 km^{2} (65,427 sq mi)
- Country: India
- States: Madhya Pradesh; Chhattisgarh; Maharashtra; Uttar Pradesh; Karnataka

Conservation
- Conservation status: critical/endangered
- Protected: 7,658 km^{2} (5%)

The Narmada Valley dry deciduous forests are a tropical dry forest ecoregion of central India. The ecoregion lies mostly in Madhya Pradesh state, but extends into portions of Chhattisgarh, Maharashtra, Karnataka and Uttar Pradesh states.

== Setting ==
The Narmada Valley dry deciduous forests cover an area of 169,900 km^{2} (65,600 sq mi) of the lower Narmada River Valley and the surrounding uplands of the Vindhya Range to the north and the western end of the Satpura Range to the south. The Narmada Valley is an east-west flat-bottomed valley, or graben, that separates the two plateaus. The Vindhya Range separates the valley from the Malwa plateau and Bundelkhand upland to the north. The Satpura Range reaches a height of 1,300m and encloses the valley on the south separating it from the Deccan plateau. The ecoregion includes the western portion of the Satpuras, and also extends to the southeast along the eastern flank of the Western Ghats' range. The uplands of this ecoregion are the northern limits of the Indian peninsula.

Rainfall in the ecoregion is highly seasonal; a seven- to eight-month dry season is followed by the June-to-September southwest monsoon, which brings 1,200–1,500 mm of rainfall in an average year. Many trees lose their leaves during the long dry season to conserve moisture.

The ecoregion lies between moister forests to the northeast, southeast, and southwest, which receive greater rainfall from the southeast monsoon, and the drier forests and scrublands of the Deccan to the south and Malwa and Gujarat to the west and northwest. The lowland Upper Gangetic Plains moist deciduous forests lie to the northeast, on the alluvial plain of the Ganges River and its tributaries below the eastern Vindhyas and the Bundelkhand upland. The Chota-Nagpur dry deciduous forests lie on the Chota Nagpur plateau to the east. The Eastern highlands moist deciduous forests, which receive more annual moisture from the Bay of Bengal, lie to the southeast. To the southwest, along the spine of the Western Ghats range, lie the wetter North Western Ghats moist deciduous forests, which receive more moisture from the southwest monsoon winds off the Arabian Sea.

To the south, the Deccan Plateau of Maharashtra lies in the rain shadow of the Western Ghats, and is home to the Central Deccan Plateau dry deciduous forests of Vidarbha and the drier Deccan thorn scrub forests of Kandesh. The Khathiar-Gir dry deciduous forests cover most of Malwa to the northwest and the lowlands of Gujarat to the west.

== Flora ==
The natural vegetation of the region is a three-tiered forest adapted to the monsoon and dry season climate. The forests typically have an upper canopy at 15–25 meters, a 10–15 meter understory of smaller trees and large shrubs, and a 3–4 meter undergrowth. Teak (Tectona grandis) is the dominant canopy tree, in association with coromandel ebony (Diospyros melanoxylon), dhaora (Anogeissus latifolia), Lagerstroemia parviflora, Terminalia tomentosa, Lannea coromandelica, Hardwickia binata, and Boswellia serrata.

Riparian areas along the regions rivers and streams, which receive year-round water, are home to moist evergreen forests, whose dominant tree species are Terminalia arjuna, Syzygium cumini, Syzygium heyneanum, Salix tetrasperma, Homonoia riparia, and Vitex negundo.

== Fauna ==
The ecoregion is home to 76 species of mammals, none of which are endemic, although several of which, including the Bengal tiger (Panthera tigris tigris), along with gaur (Bos gaurus), packs of dhole or Asiatic wild dog (Cuon alpinus), sloth bear (Melursus ursinus), chousingha (Tetracerus quadricornis), and blackbuck (Antilope cervicapra), are threatened.

The ecoregion is home to 276 bird species, none of which are endemic. Large threatened birds include the lesser florican (Eupodotis indica) and Indian bustard (Ardeotis nigriceps).

== Conservation ==
This area is densely populated and only about 30% of the ecoregion is covered in relatively intact vegetation, but this does include some large blocks of habitat in the amarkantak, Vindhya and Satpura ranges which are important for the preservation of the tiger.

=== Protected areas ===
As of 1997, about 5% of the ecoregion (7,500 km^{2}) lies within protected areas, the largest of which are Melghat Tiger Reserve and Nauradehi Wildlife Sanctuary while others include Bandhavgarh, Panna, and Sanjay national parks. Plans to dam the Narmada River will impact on the wildlife of the ecoregion.

- Aner Dam Wildlife Sanctuary, Dhule district, Maharashtra (70 km^{2})
- Bagdara Wildlife Sanctuary, Madhya Pradesh (540 km^{2})
- Bandhavgarh National Park , Umaria district, Madhya Pradesh (360 km^{2})
- Achanakmar Wildlife Sanctuary, Bilaspur District, Chhattisgarh (305 km^{2}
- Kheoni Wildlife Sanctuary, Madhya Pradesh (80 km^{2})
- Nauradehi Wildlife Sanctuary, Madhya Pradesh (1,380 km^{2})
- Melghat Tiger Reserve, Amravati district, Maharashtra. Includes Melghat Wildlife Sanctuary (1,490 km^{2}) and Gugamal National Park (1974 km^{2})
- Panna National Park, Panna and Chhatarpur districts, Madhya Pradesh (820 km^{2})
- Panpatha Wildlife Sanctuary, Madhya Pradesh (300 km^{2})
- Ratapani Tiger Reserve, Madhya Pradesh (490 km^{2})
- Sanjay-Dubri Tiger Reserve (831 km^{2}), which includes Sanjay National Park, Chhattisgarh, and Dubri Wildlife Sanctuary.
- Sardarpur Wildlife Sanctuary, Madhya Pradesh (120 km^{2})
- Singhori Wildlife Sanctuary, Madhya Pradesh (220 km^{2})
- Son Gharial Wildlife Sanctuary, Madhya Pradesh (210 km^{2})
- Yawal Wildlife Sanctuary, Jalgaon district, Maharashtra (100 km^{2})

== See also ==
- Ecoregions of India
