= Nepanagar railway station =

Railway station in Madhya Pradesh

Nepanagar
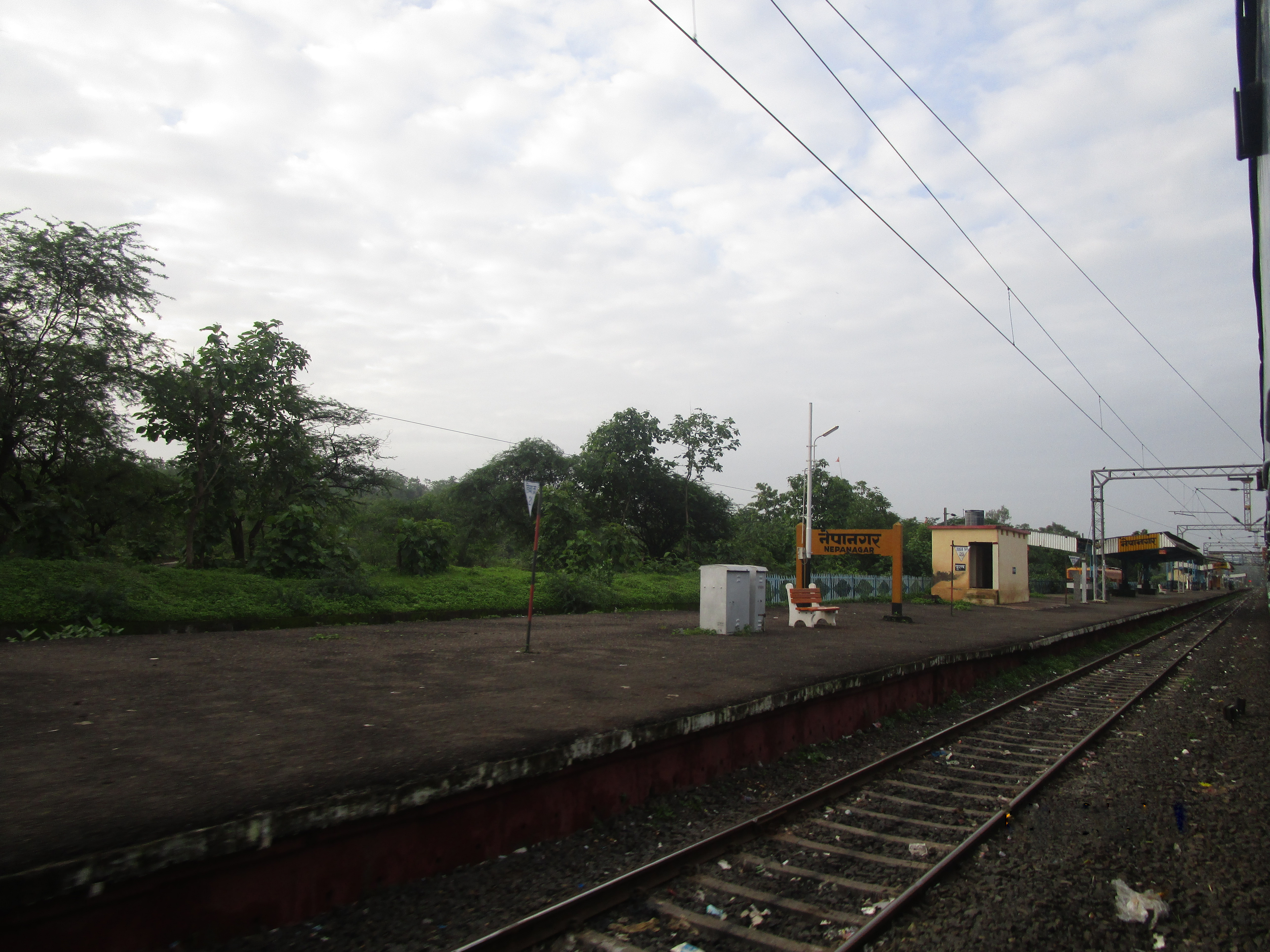
- Nepanagar railway station

General information
- Location: Yawal Wildlife Sanctuary, State Highway 27,Nepanagar, Madhya Pradesh; India
- Coordinates: 21°27′50″N 76°23′49″E
- Elevation: 289 metres (948 ft)
- System: Indian Railways station
- Owner: Indian Railways
- Operator: Central Railway
- Line: Jabalpur–Bhusaval section
- Platforms: 2
- Tracks: 6 (Double Electrified BG)
- Connections: Auto stand

Construction
- Structure type: Standard (on ground station)
- Parking: yes

Other information
- Status: Functioning
- Station code: NPNR
- Zone(s): Central Railway
- Division(s): Bhusawal
Location
- Location within India Location within Madhya Pradesh

Nepanagar railway station with the code NPNR is a small railway station located in Burhanpur district, Madhya Pradesh, and serves the town of Nepanagar. The station consists of two platforms, both of which are poorly sheltered, and lack several essential facilities including water and sanitation.

Only single express that stops at Nepanagar is : (as of December 2020 )

- Kushinagar Express
