= Nepanagar Assembly constituency =

Constituency of the Madhya Pradesh legislative assembly in India

Coordinates: 21.45°N 76.43°E

Nepanagar
- Constituency No. 179 for the Madhya Pradesh Legislative Assembly

Constituency details
- Country: India
- Region: Central India
- State: Madhya Pradesh
- District: Burhanpur
- Lok Sabha constituency: Khandwa
- Established: 1977
- Reservation: ST

Member of Legislative Assembly
- 16th Madhya Pradesh Legislative Assembly
- Incumbent Sumitra Devi Kasdekar
- Party: Bharatiya Janata Party
- Elected year: 2023
- Preceded by: Manju Rajendra Dadu

Nepanagar is one of the 230 constituencies in the Madhya Pradesh Legislative Assembly of Madhya Pradesh a central state of India. Nepanagar is also part of Khandwa Lok Sabha constituency. It is a reserved seat for the Scheduled Tribe (ST).

== Members of the Legislative Assembly ==
Election	Member	Party
1977	Brijmohan Mishra	Janata Party
1980	Tanwant Singh Keer	Indian National Congress (Indira)
1985	Tanwant Singh Keer	Indian National Congress
1990	Brijmohan Mishra	Bharatiya Janata Party
1993	Tanwant Singh Keer	Indian National Congress
1998	Raghunath Chaudhary	Indian National Congress
2003	Archana Chitnis	Bharatiya Janata Party
2008	Rajendra Shyamlal Dadu	Bharatiya Janata Party
2013	Rajendra Shyamlal Dadu	Bharatiya Janata Party
2016 (Note: by-poll)	Manju Rajendra Dadu	Bharatiya Janata Party
2018	Sumitra Devi Kasdekar	Indian National Congress
2020 (Note: by-poll)	Sumitra Devi Kasdekar	Bharatiya Janata Party
2023	Manju Rajendra Dadu	Bharatiya Janata Party

== Election results ==
=== 2023 ===
2023 Madhya Pradesh Legislative Assembly election: Nepanagar
Party	Candidate	Votes	%	±%
BJP	Manju Rajendra Dadu	113,400	54.85	+8.86
INC	Gendu Bai	68,595	33.18	−13.51
Independent	Bilarsingh Jamra	16,365	7.92	
Independent	Ratilal Bhaulal Chilatre	2,632	1.27	
NOTA	None of the above	2,303	1.11	−0.29
Majority		44,805	21.67	+20.97
Turnout		206,730	78.64	+0.91
BJP hold		Swing		

=== 2020 bypoll ===
2020 Madhya Pradesh Legislative Assembly by-elections: Nepanagar
Party	Candidate	Votes	%	±%
BJP	Sumitra Devi Kasdekar	98,881	53.7	
INC	Ram Kishan Patel	72,541	39.4	
BSP	Bhal Singh	3,051	1.66	
Independent	Sanjay Kumar	2,756	1.5	
VBA	Devidas Bandekar	2,603	1.41	
NOTA	None of the above	2,736	1.49	
Majority		26,340	14.30	
Turnout		184,135	76.16	
BJP gain from INC		Swing		

=== 2018 ===
2018 Madhya Pradesh Legislative Assembly election: Nepanagar
Party	Candidate	Votes	%	±%
INC	Sumitra Devi Kasdekar	85,320	46.69	
BJP	Manju Rajendra Dadu	84,056	45.99	
SS	Gansingh Patel	3,721	2.04	
BSP	Ashok Totaram Marko	2,918	1.6	
NOTA	None of the above	2,551	1.4	
Majority		1,264	0.7	
Turnout		182,751	77.73	
INC gain from BJP		Swing		

=== 2013 ===
2013 Madhya Pradesh Legislative Assembly election: Nepanagar
Party	Candidate	Votes	%	±%
BJP	Rajendra Shyamlal Dadu	87,224	51.82	
INC	Ram Kishan Patel	65,046	38.65	
NOTA	None of the Above	4,740	2.82	
BSP	Bhalsingh Versingh Dahadiya	4,394	2.61	
NCP	Suneeta Premsingh Jamara	2,299	1.37	
Majority		22,178	13.56	
Turnout		1,68,321	78.51	
BJP hold		Swing		

== See also ==
- Nepanagar
- List of constituencies of Madhya Pradesh Legislative Assembly
- Burhanpur district
