= Manju Rajendra Dadu =

Indian politician

Member of the Madhya Pradesh Legislative Assembly
- Incumbent
- Assumed office 2023
- Constituency: Nepanagar

Personal details
- Party: Bhartiya Janta Party
- Occupation: Politician

Manju Rajendra Dadu (born 1989) is an Indian politician from Madhya Pradesh. She is a member of the Madhya Pradesh Legislative Assembly representing the Bharatiya Janata Party from Nepanagar Assembly constituency in Burhanpur district. She won the 2023 Madhya Pradesh Legislative Assembly election.

== Early life and education ==
Dadu was born in Vadnagar. She hails from an agricultural family. Her late father was Rajendra Shyamlal Dadu. She completed her BBA in 2013 from Poonam Chand Vocational College, Khandwa affiliated to Devi Ahilya University, Indore, Madhya Pradesh.

== Career ==
Dadu won the 2016 Madhya Pradesh byelection from Nepanagar defeating Antarsingh Devisingh Barde Amba of Indian National Congress. She won for the second time as an MLA in the 2023 Madhya Pradesh Legislative Assembly election again on BJP ticket from Nepanagar. She defeated Gendu Bai of Indian National Congress by a huge margin of 45,805 votes. She lost the 2018 Madhya Pradesh Legislative Assembly election by a narrow margin of 1,264 votes to Sumitra Devi Kasdekar of Indian National Congress.
