= Babulal Tiwari =

Indian politician

Member of Parliament, Lok Sabha
- In office 1952–1962
- Succeeded by: Mahesh Dutta Mishra
- Constituency: Khandwa, Madhya Pradesh

Personal details
- Born: 1895
- Party: Indian National Congress
- Spouse: Fulwati

Babulal Tiwari is an Indian politician. He was elected to the Lok Sabha, lower house of the Parliament of India from Khandwa, Madhya Pradesh as a member of the Indian National Congress.
