= Khathiar–Gir dry deciduous forests =

Ecoregion in India

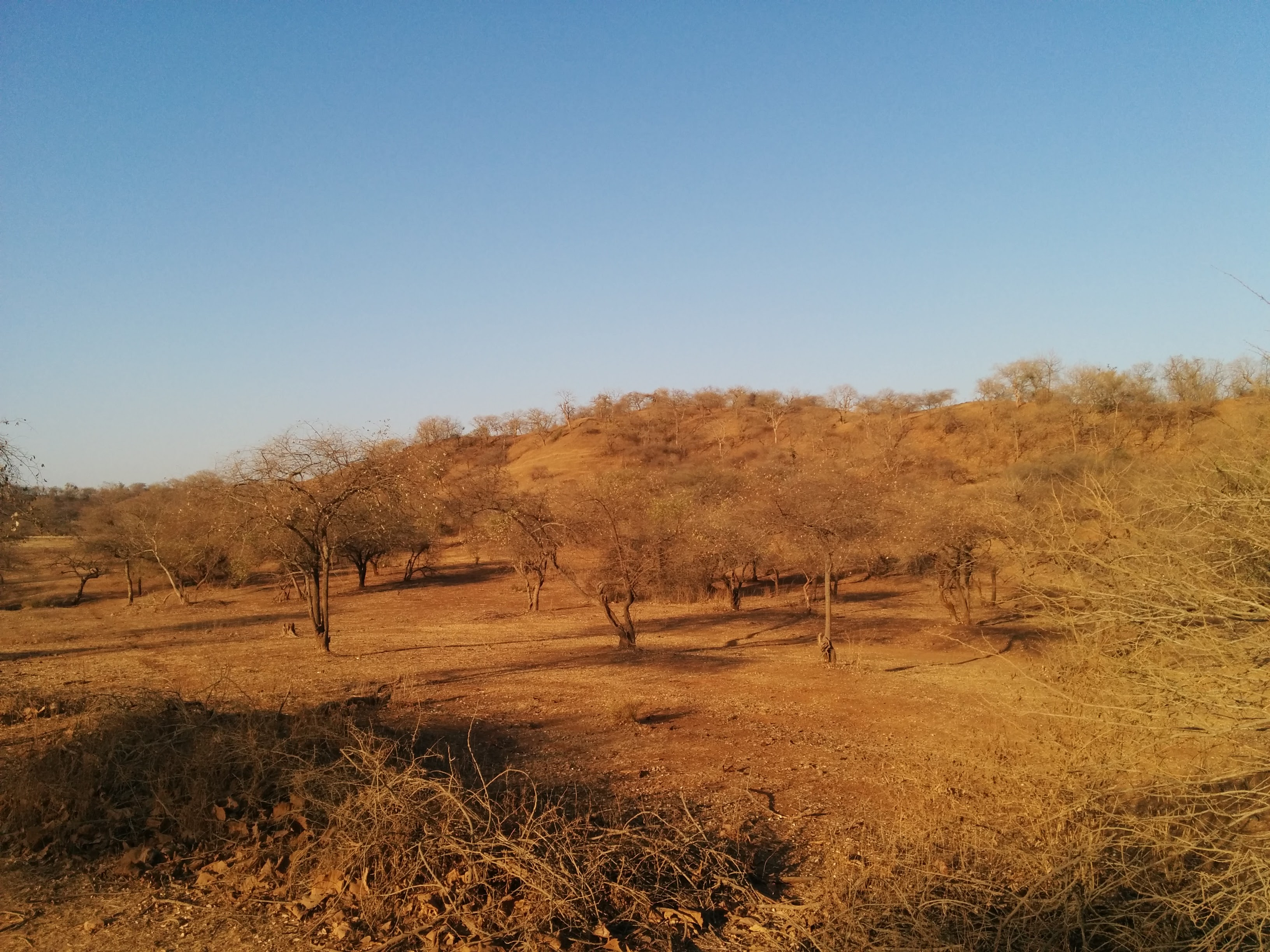
- arid landscape in Gir Forest

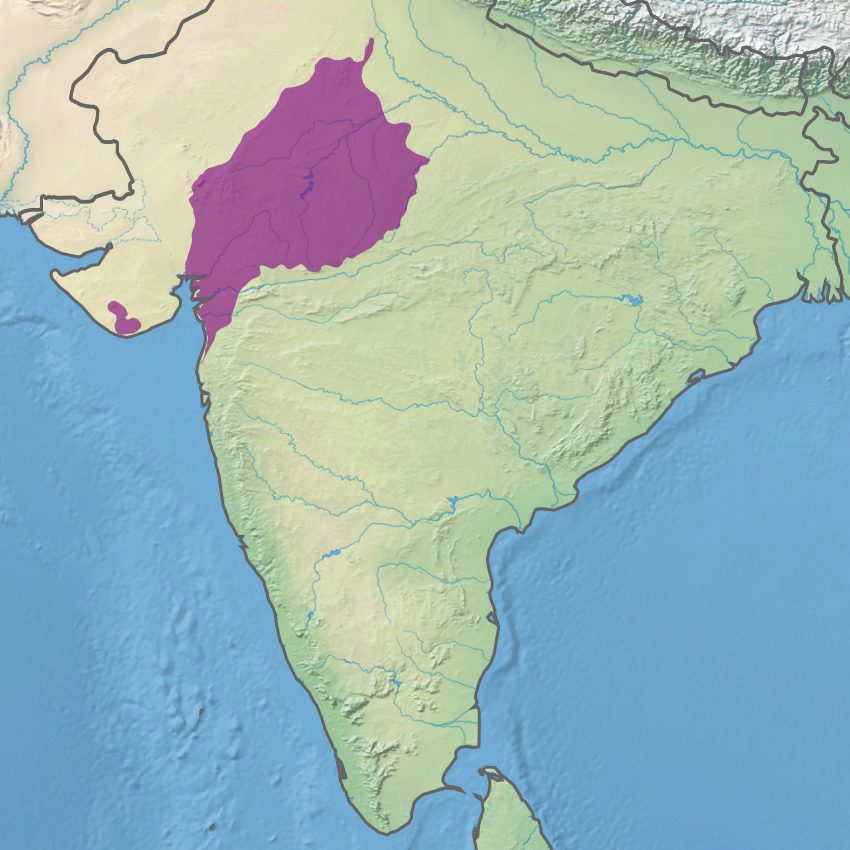
- Ecoregion territory (in purple)

Ecology
- Realm: Indomalayan
- Biome: tropical and subtropical dry broadleaf forests
- Borders: Narmada Valley dry deciduous forests; North Western Ghats moist deciduous forests; Northwestern thorn scrub forests; Upper Gangetic Plains moist deciduous forests

Geography
- Area: 265,995 km^{2} (102,701 sq mi)
- Country: India
- states: Gujarat; Madhya Pradesh; Rajasthan
- Coordinates: 24.8°N 75.8°E

Conservation
- Conservation status: critical/endangered
- Protected: 11,335 km² (4%)

The Khathiar–Gir dry deciduous forests (also Kathiarbar-Gir or Kathiawar-Gir) is a mostly arid ecoregion in northwestern India that stretches over 103,100 sq mi (267,000 km^{2}) across Gujarat, Rajasthan and Madhya Pradesh. The dry deciduous forests in the region are dominated by teak, and thorny trees and scrub in drier areas.

== Landscape ==
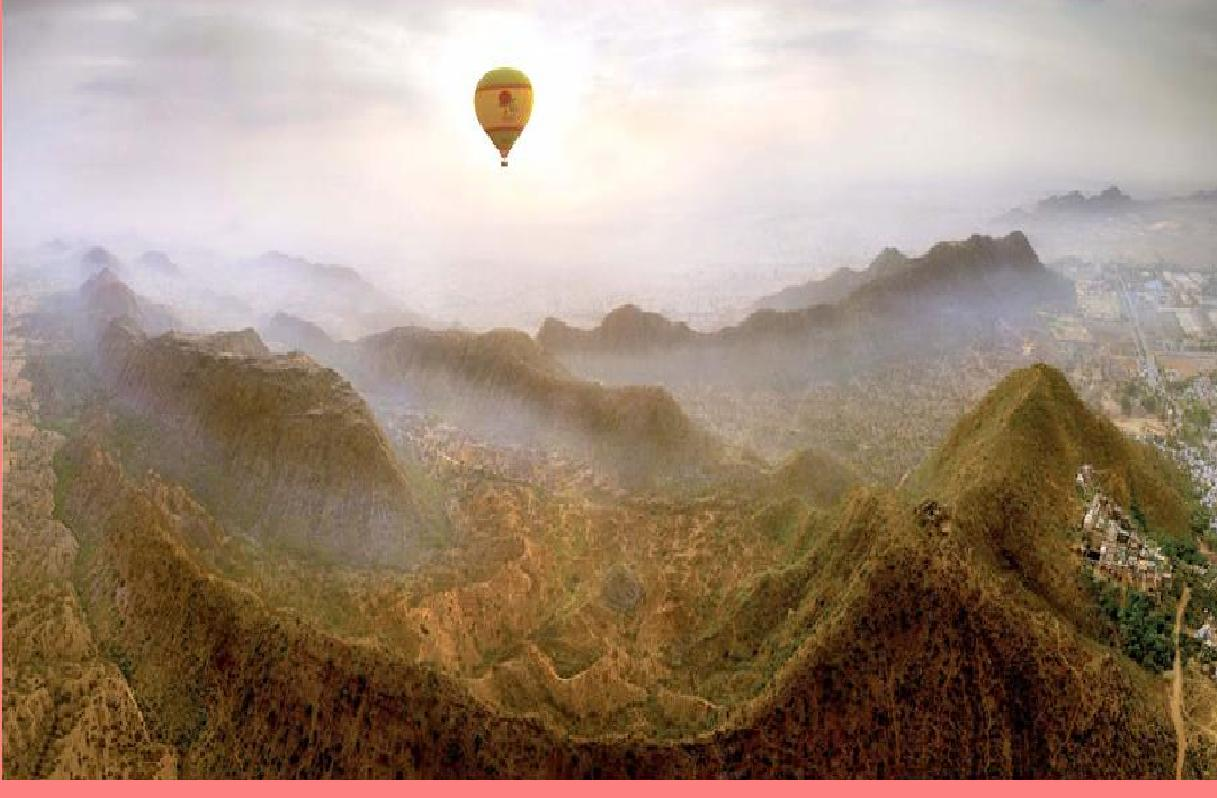
The Aravalli Range is part of this ecoregion

The Khathiar–Gir dry deciduous forests include the Aravalli Range, the high point of which is Mount Abu with an elevation of 1,721 m (5,646 feet), and a small part of the Northwestern thorn scrub forests in the west. In the west is the Kathiawar Peninsula and the strip of western Rajasthan between the Aravalli Range and Thar Desert. To the northwest, the Kathiawar-Gir dry deciduous forests transit to the Upper Gangetic Plains moist deciduous forests. To the southeast lies the Narmada Valley dry deciduous forests, of the Vindhya Range, and the Narmada River Valley. The ecoregion also borders the North Western Ghats moist deciduous forests in southeastern Gujarat.

The ecoregion has a tropical monsoon climate, with most of its 550 to 700 mm average annual rainfall during the June–September southwest monsoon and little for the remaining months of the year, while temperatures often exceed 40 °C. Higher elevations of the Aravallis stay cooler, and the windward slopes (generally southeast-facing) receive higher rainfall. This results in a dry landscape of thorny scrub, bare trees and rocks.

== Flora ==
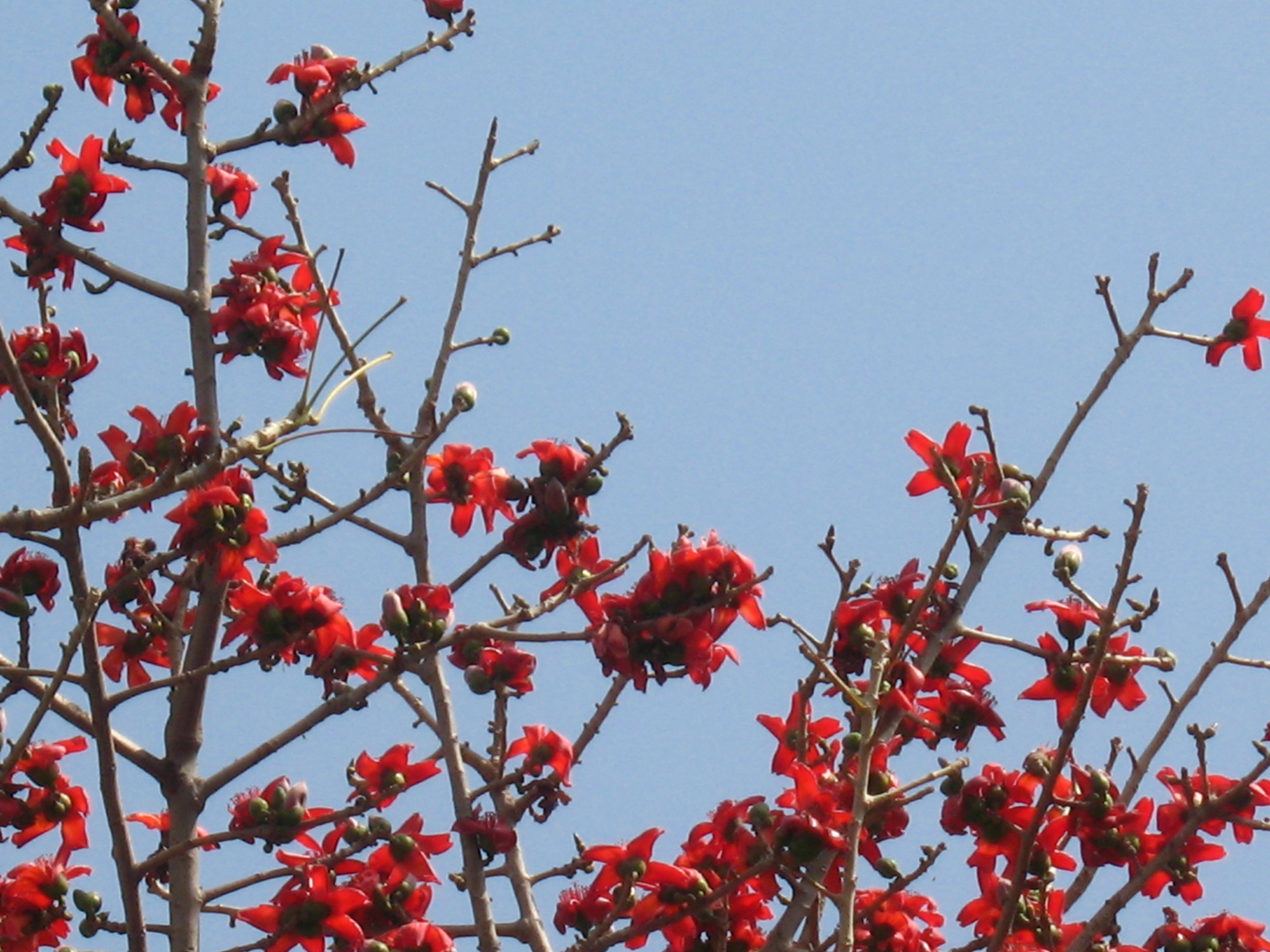
A silk-cotton tree in full bloom

The composition of the ecoregion's forests varies with moisture and soil. They have a three-storied structure, with the top story reaching 15 to 25 m (49 to 82 ft). Arid areas are dominated by Anogeissus pendula, growing in association with khair, especially on the quartzite ridges, and gneiss hillocks of the Aravalli Range. Less arid areas are dominated by teak (Tectona grandis), bael (Aegle marmelos), Boswellia serrata, Desmodium oojeinense, Diospyros species, silk-cotton tree, Sterculia urens, Phyllanthus emblica, Dalbergia lanceolaria subsp. paniculata, and Terminalia elliptica. Thorn scrub forests, characterized by Euphorbia caducifolia, Gymnosporia emarginata, Senegalia senegal, Commiphora mukul, Wrightia tinctoria, Flueggea leucopyrus, Grewia species, occur on rocky Aravalli hillsides and in degraded areas. Date palms (Phoenix sylvestris) and fig trees (Ficus racemosa) grow near rivers and streams of the hills. Strobilanthes halbergii, is endemic to the ecoregion.

Mount Abu is covered in dry deciduous thorn forest at lower elevations, with semi-evergreen forest along watercourses and in higher-elevation valleys. Common trees include Terminalia coronata var. parvifolia, Boswellia serrata, Mangifera indica, Phoenix sylvestris, Ficus bengalensis, other Ficus spp. Carissa spinarum, Caesalpinia spp., and Zizyphus spp. 830 plant species from 112 families are native to Mount Abu, including the endemic species Dicliptera abuensis and 328 species of medicinal value.

== Fauna ==
Bird species include the:

- Endangered great Indian bustard (Ardeotis nigriceps),
- lesser florican (Eupodotis indica)
- near-endemic white-naped tit (Machlolophus nuchalis), which inhabits the thorny scrub areas of the ecoregion.

Mount Abu's range of habitats, including dry thorn forests and its relict semi-evergreen forests, makes it an important area for birds. The mountain is home to two Critically Endangered species, the white-rumped vulture (Gyps bengalensis) and long-billed vulture (Gyps indicus), and two Vulnerable species, the green munia (Amandava formosa) and white-naped tit (Machlolophus nuchalis). Mount Aravalli is home to the northernmost population of grey junglefowl (Gallus sonneratii), a mostly southern Indian species. The Aravalli red spurfowl (Galloperdix spadicea caurina) is a subspecies of red spurfowl endemic to the Aravalli Range, with its largest population on and around Mount Abu.

The protected areas of this region are also home to 80 mammal species including

- Indian leopard (Panthera pardus fusca), Indian wolf (Canis lupus pallipes), striped hyena (Hyaena hyaena), four-horned antelope (Tetracerus quadricornis), blackbuck (Antilope cervicapra), and chinkara (Gazella bennettii) sambar deer (Cervus unicolor), and spotted deer (Axis axis).
- jungle cat (Felis chaus), Asiatic wildcat (Felis silvestris ornata) and rusty-spotted cat (Prionailurus rubiginosus).
- golden jackal (Canis aureus)
- Bengal tiger (Panthera tigris tigris) in the eastern part of this ecoregion
- Asiatic lion (Panthera leo leo) in Gir National Park and surrounding areas in Kathiawar Peninsula
- Sloth bear (Melursus ursinus) in Ratan Mahal Wildlife Sanctuary

Other native mammals include the northern plains gray langur (Semnopithecus entellus), small Indian civet (Viverricula indica), Indian crested porcupine (Hystrix indica), honey badger or ratel (Mellivora capensis), Indian pangolin (Manis crassicaudata), and Indian fox (Vulpes bengalensis).

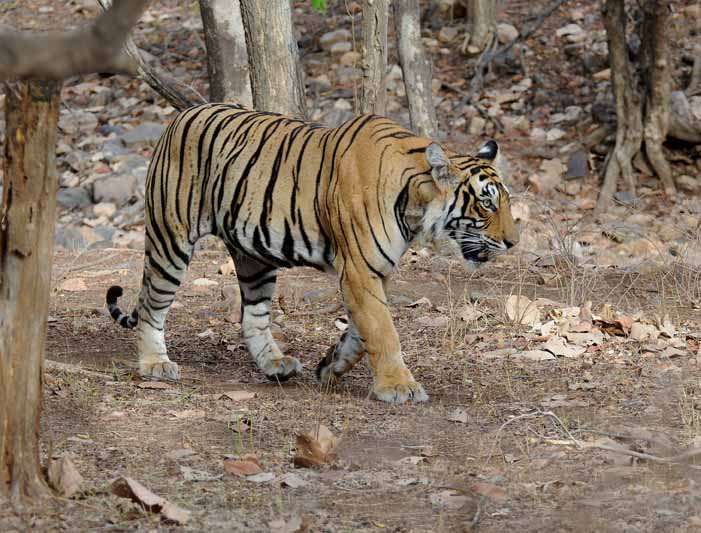
Bengal tiger in Ranthambore National Park, Rajasthan

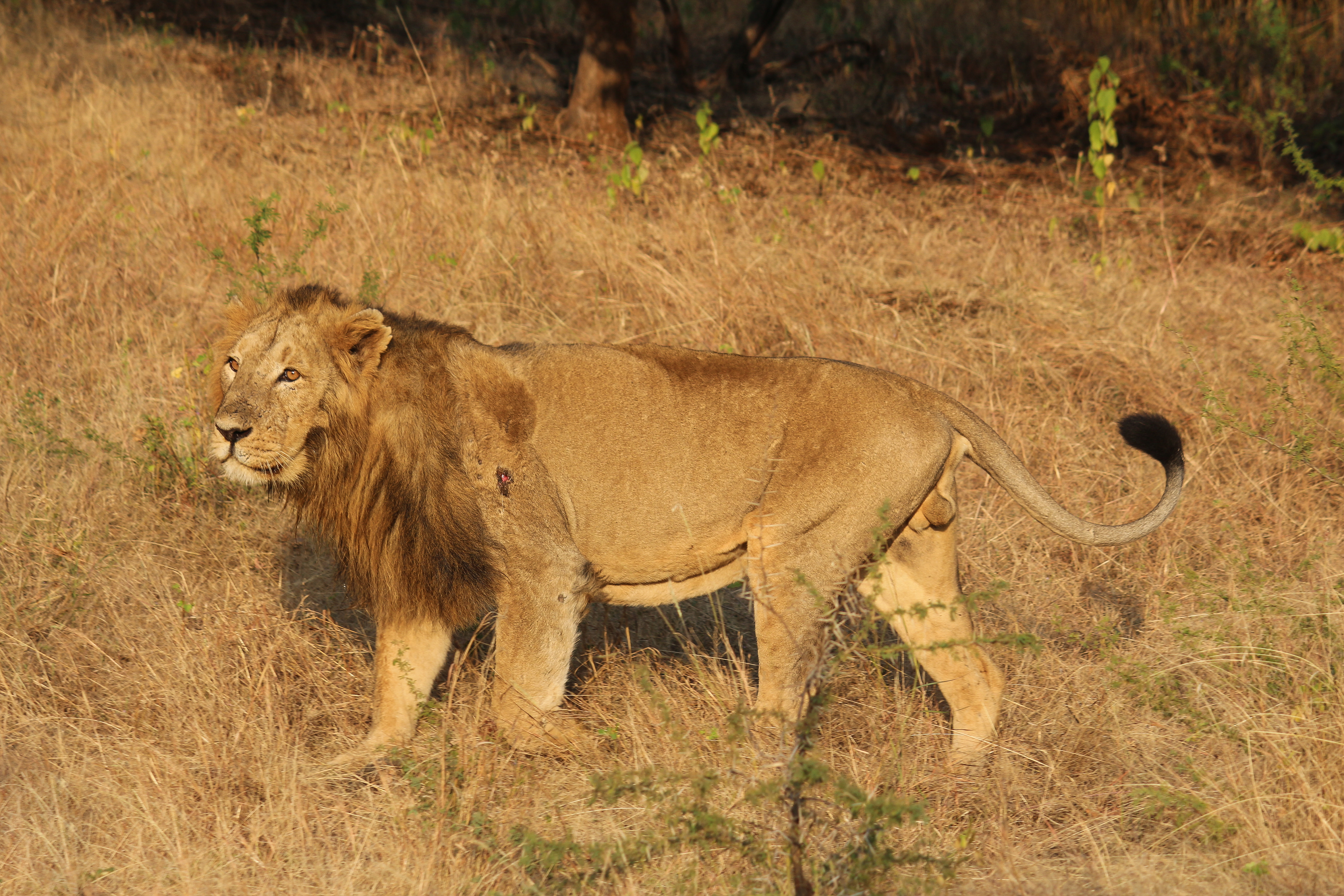
Male Asiatic lion in Gir Forest National Park, Gujarat

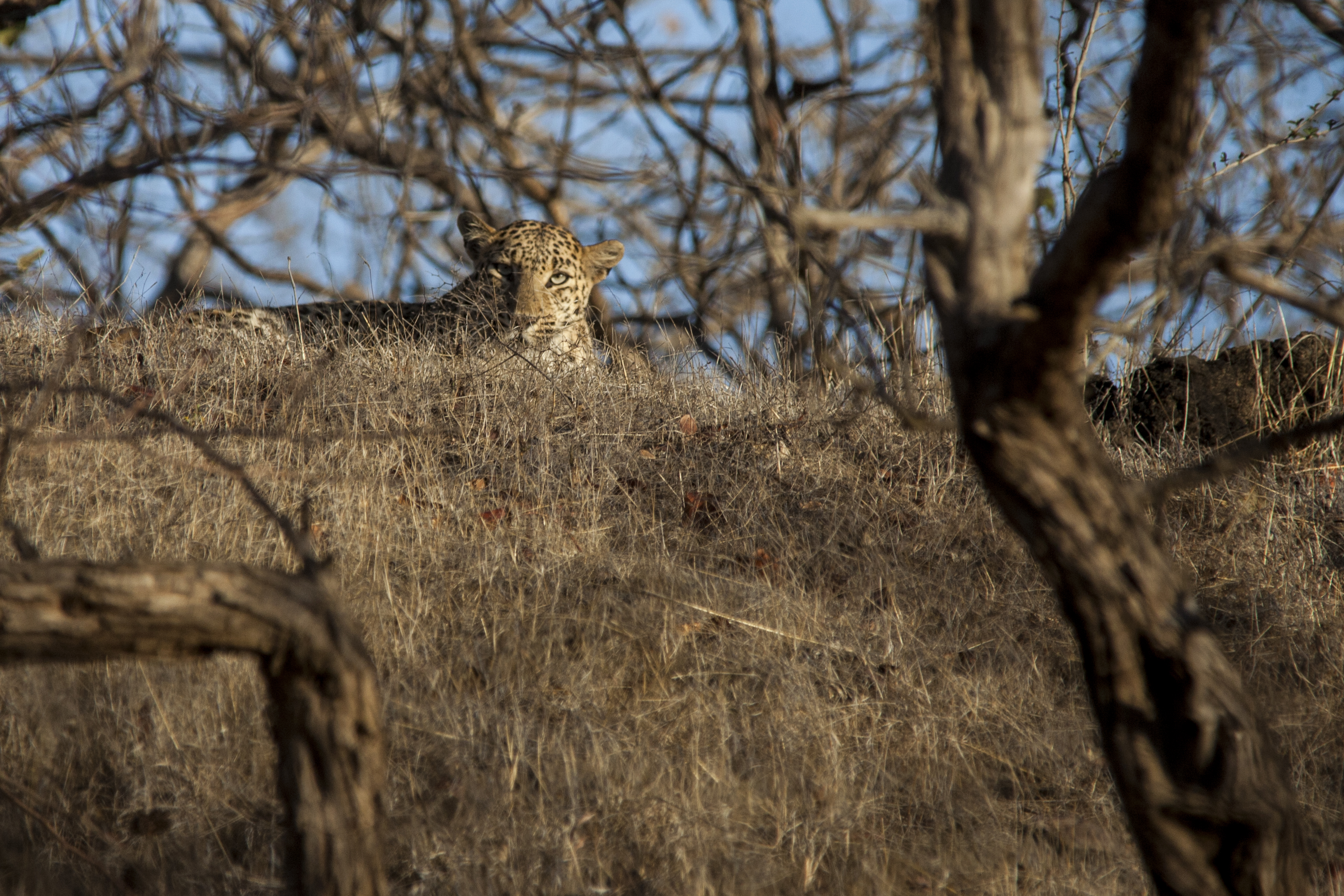
Indian leopard at Gir

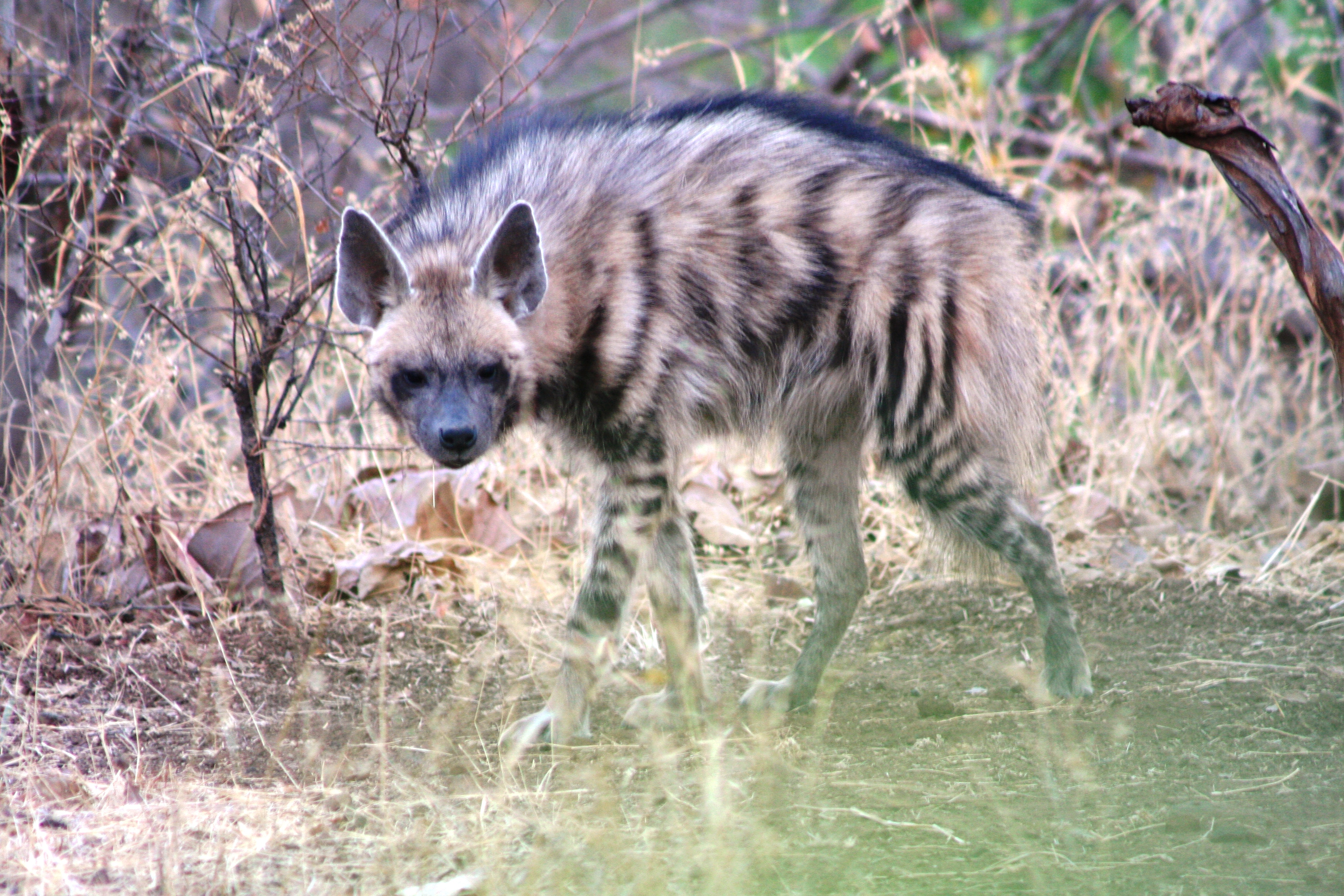
Striped hyena

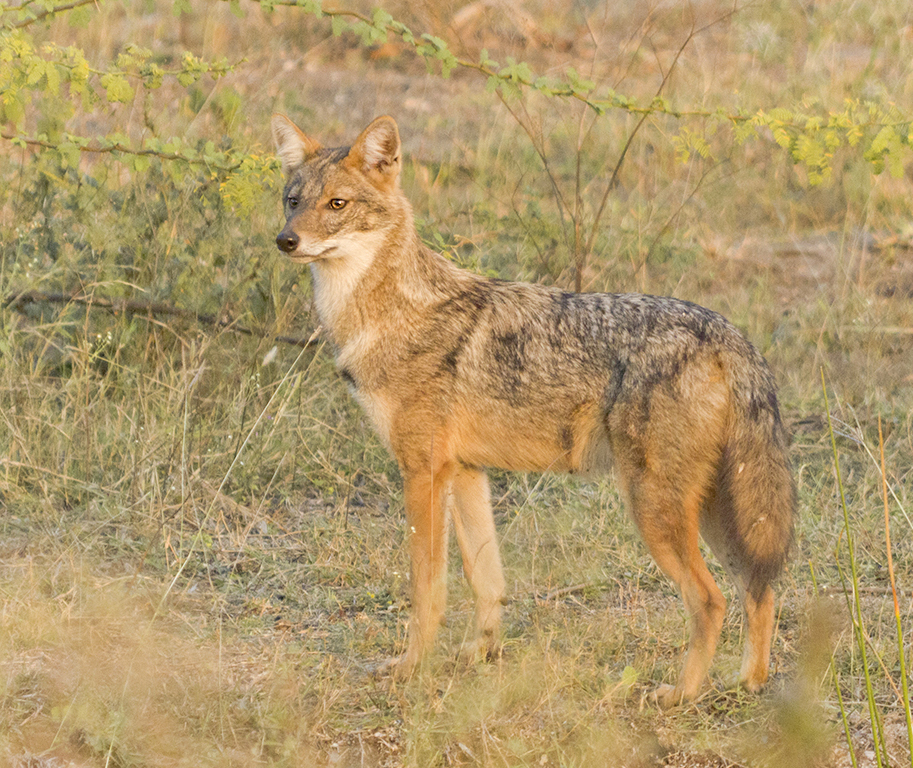
Golden jackal in the area of Rajkot

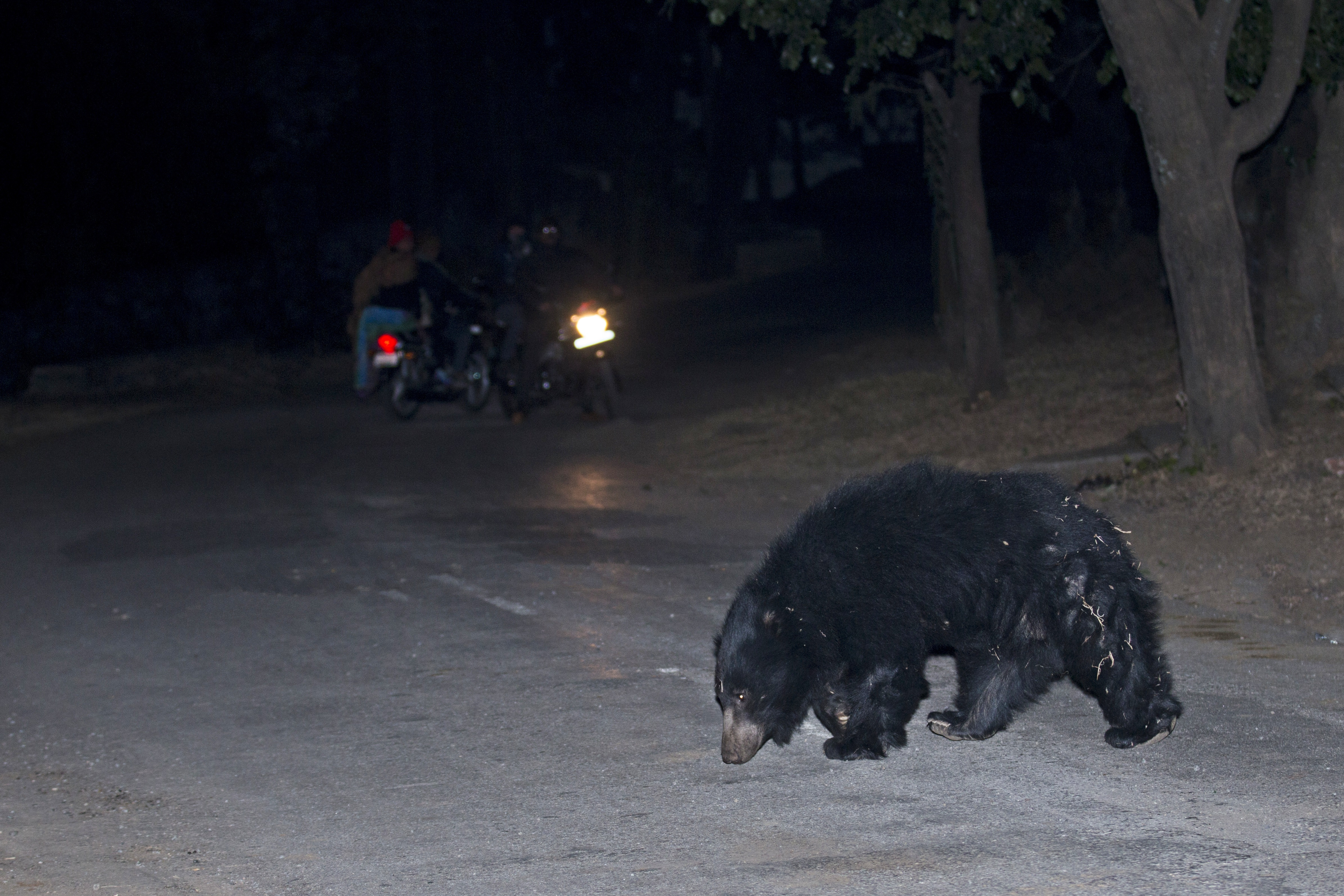
An Indian sloth bear walking on the road in Ratan Mahal Sloth Bear Sanctuary

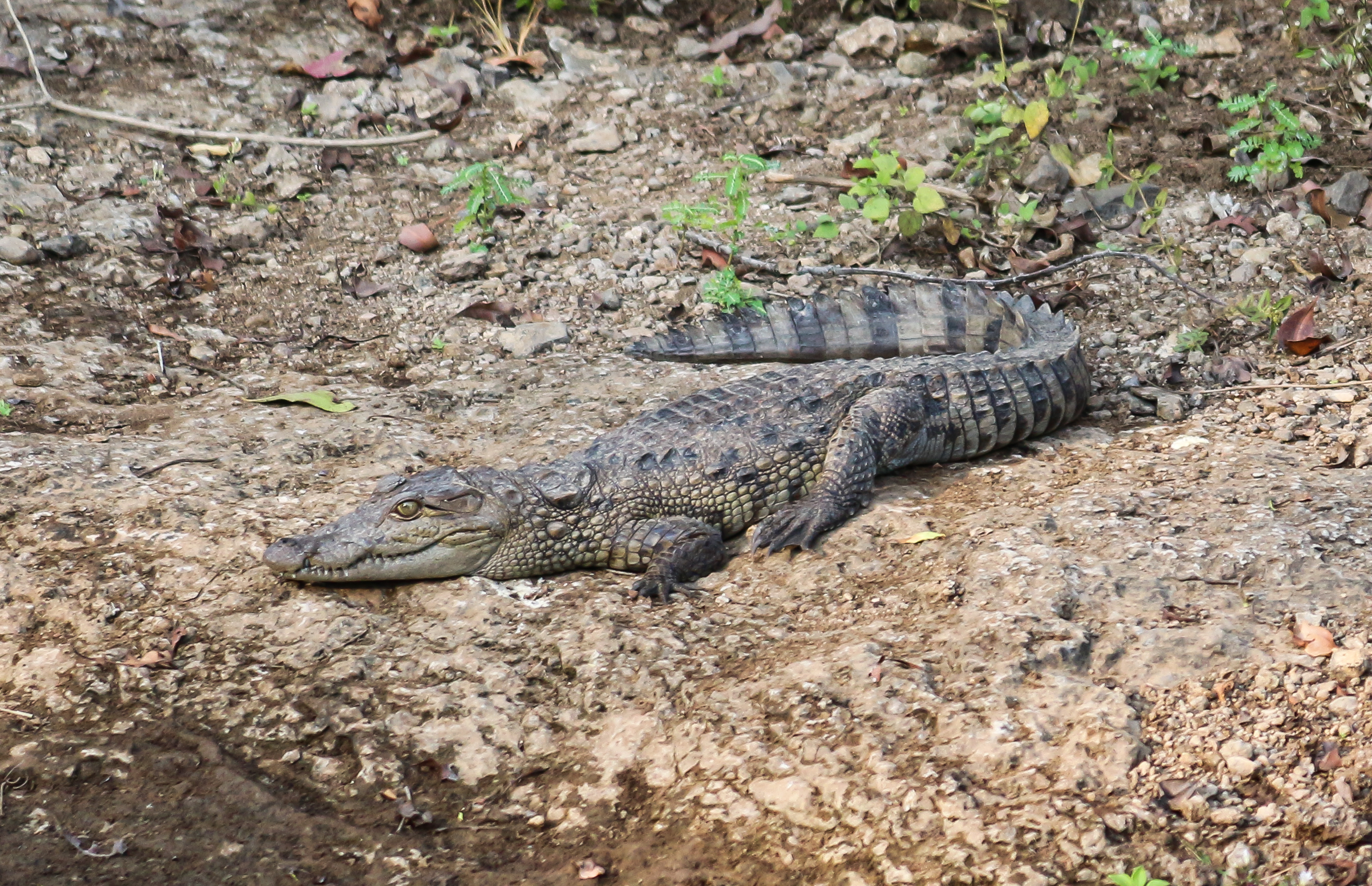
Mugger crocodile at Gir

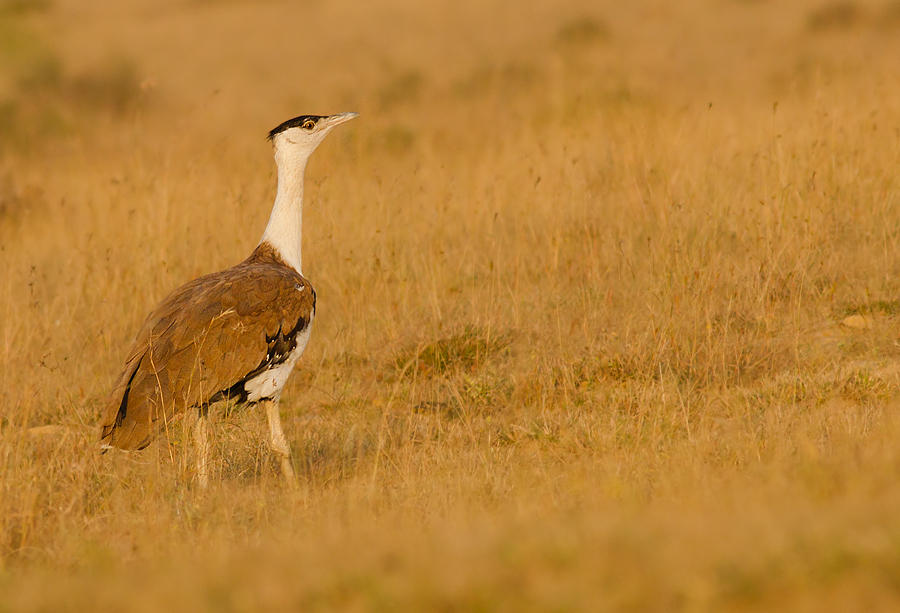
Great Indian bustard at the Naliya grasslands, Kutch

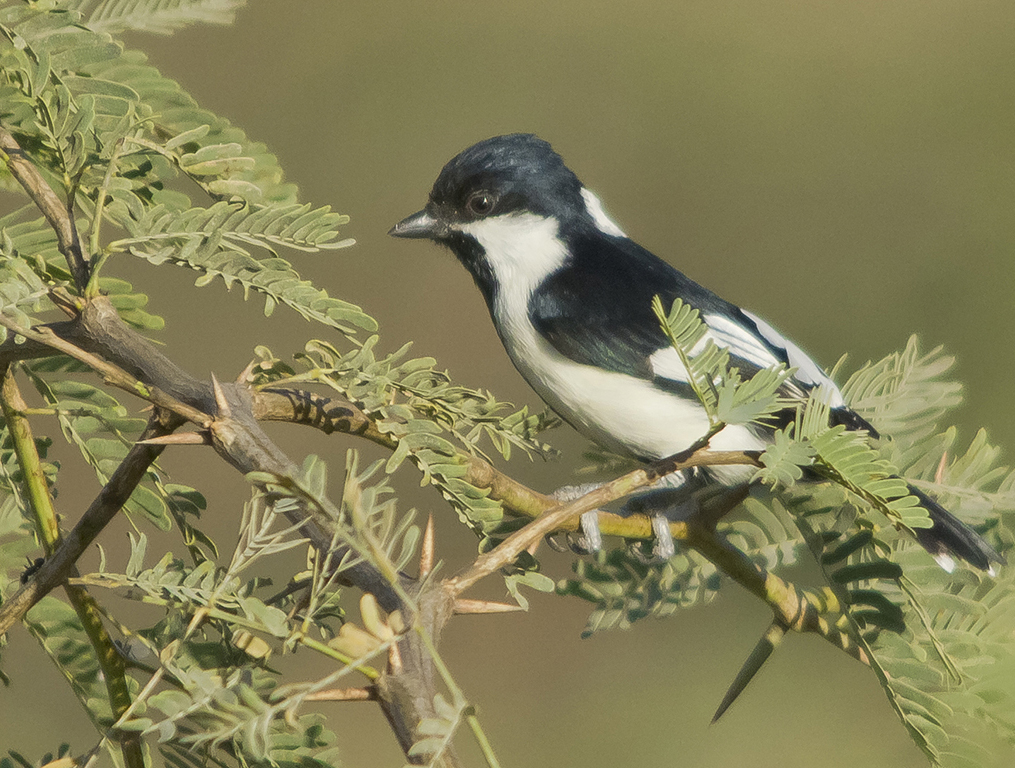
White-naped tit foraging on Prosopis juliflora at Kutch

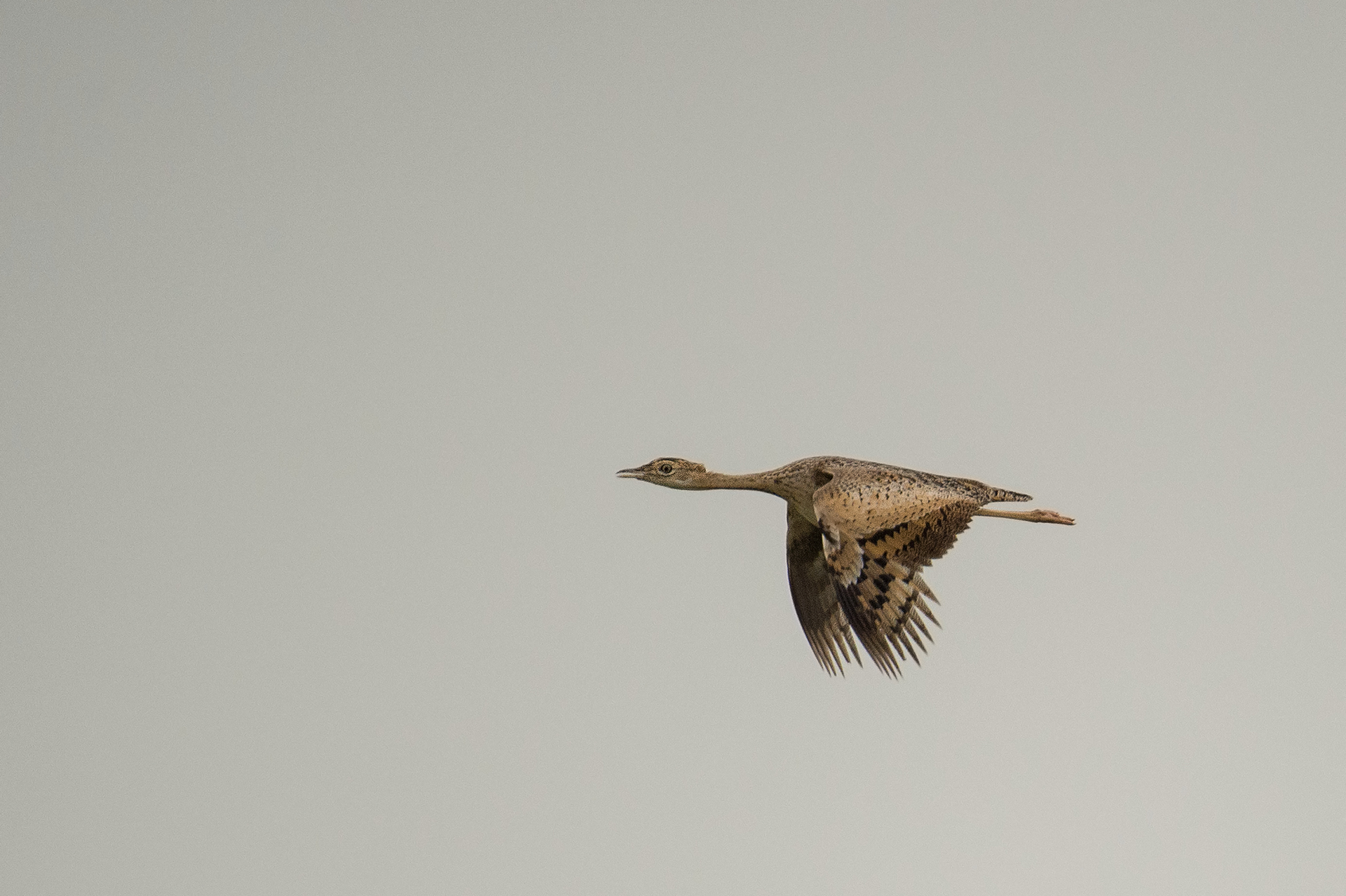
A female lesser florican in flight from Rajasthan

== Threats to biodiversity ==
The human population in the region is growing, and wildlife habitats have mostly been removed or degraded due to collection of firewood and timber, and use as grazing land for livestock.

== Protected areas ==
Protected areas cover 8,980 km^{2} (3,470 sq mi) in this ecoregion, and include:

- Balaram Ambaji Wildlife Sanctuary
- Darrah National Park (including Jawahar Sagar Wildlife Sanctuary and National Chambal Sanctuary)
- Gandhi Sagar Sanctuary
- Ghatigaon Wildlife Sanctuary
- Gir Forest National Park
- Jaisamand Wildlife Sanctuary
- Jambughoda Wildlife Sanctuary
- Kumbhalgarh Wildlife Sanctuary
- Kuno National Park
- Madhav National Park
- Mount Abu Wildlife Sanctuary
- Nahargarh Biological Park
- Ramgarh Wildlife Sanctuary
- Ranthambore National Park
- Ratan Mahal Wildlife Sanctuary
- Sailana Kharmour Bird Sanctuary
- Sariska Tiger Reserve
- Sita Mata Wildlife Sanctuary

== See also ==
- Ecoregions of India
