= Bodarli =

- village
- Location in Madhya Pradesh
- Coordinates: 21.242°N 76.355°E
- Country: India
- State: Madhya Pradesh
- District: Burhanpur

Population (2011)
  - Total: 6,000

Bodarli is a village in Burhanpur district of Madhya Pradesh, India. Bodarli is a village with a population of nearly 6,000.
