= Aner Dam Wildlife Sanctuary =

Wildlife sanctuary in India

- IUCN category IV (habitat/species management area)
- Location within Maharashtra Location within India
- Interactive map of Aner Dam Wildlife Sanctuary
- Location: Dhule district, Maharashtra, India
- Nearest city: Shirpur and Chopda
- Coordinates: 21°21′00″N 75°01′21″E
- Area: 82.94 km^{2} (32.02 sq mi)
- Established: 13 November 1986
- Governing body: Maharashtra State Forest Department

The AnerDam Wildlife Sanctuary is located in Shirpur talukas of Dhule district, India. The sanctuary is spread over southwestern side of Satpura hill ranges. This sanctuary is spread around the catchment area of Aner river specially above the high flood level around the Aner Dam. This sanctuary has common boundary with Yawal Wildlife Sanctuary in Jalgaon district and forest area of Khargone district in Madhyapradesh.

== Location ==
The nearest rail head is Jalgaon Town of Maharashtra state which is 71 km from the sanctuary. Regular buses are available from Shirpur and lasur Road Bus Stand. The sanctuary is open for visitors from sunrise to sunset. There are many hotels and resorts located near Shirpur town.

== Management ==
The AnerDam sanctuary is a part of Chhatrapati Sambhaji Maharaj Nagar Wildlife Division. The Range Forest Officer (Wildlife) located at Shirpur is in charge of the sanctuary.

== Flora ==
The forest types is Southern moist deciduous forest. Most of the forest area is degraded scrub land with patches of wooded land. The common trees found are Acacia catechu (Khair), Acacia leucophloea (Hiwar), Acacia nilotica (Babul), Aegle marmelos (Bel), Albizzia lebbek, Albizzia procera, Anogeissus latifolia (Dhawda), Butea monosperma (Palas), Boswellia serrata (Salaia), Ficus and Terminalia species. The common shrubs include Vites negundo, zizyphus species, Cassia auriculata (tarwad), Carissa carandas, and Helicteres isora (Murudsheng).

== Fauna ==
The animals include Leopard, wildcat, Black Buck, Jackal, wolf, monitor lizards, porcupine, Barking deer, Hares. The birds include peacock and water fowls like cranes, storks, Brahmani duck are found.

== Tourist Places ==
The major tourist place is AnerDam. The sanctuary is not accessible specially during rainy season. There is PWD rest house at Shirpur and Forest Rest house at Rohini and Chopda.

== Threats ==
The threats include Illicit cutting, forest fires, encroachment, hunting and trespassing. The spread of shrubby weed Lantana camara is causing damage to the grasslands.
