= Sangvi Budruk =

Village in Maharashtra

Sangvi Budruk Dongar Sangvi
- village
- Location in Maharashtra, India Sangvi Budruk (India)
- Country: India
- State: Maharashtra
- District: Jalgaon

Government
  - Type: village
- Elevation: 209 m (686 ft)

Languages
  - Official: Marathi
- Time zone: UTC+5:30 (IST)
- Postal code: 425326

Sangvi Budruk is a village in Yawal Taluka of Jalgaon district in the northwestern part of the state of Maharashtra, India. It is situated near the Satpuda range in the Khandesh region, and on Burhanpur - Ankleshwar National Highway 4. This Village has History. Famous Freedom Fighter Shri. Digambar Fakira Patil (INA) was from Sangvi Bk village.

Sangvi has an average elevation of 209 metres (686 ft) and is in the Yawal Wildlife Sanctuary.

== Education ==
Jyoti Vidya Mandir Highschool and Junior College & ITI Department.
