= Gangacharan Dixit =

Indian politician

Member of Parliament, Lok Sabha
- In office 1967–1977
- Preceded by: Mahesh Dutta Mishra
- Succeeded by: Parmanand Thakurdas Govindjiwala
- Constituency: Khandwa, Madhya Pradesh

Personal details
- Born: 19 December 1901
- Party: Indian National Congress
- Spouse: Kamladevi Dixit

Gangacharan Dixit is an Indian politician. He was elected to the Lok Sabha, lower house of the Parliament of India from Khandwa, Madhya Pradesh as a member of the Indian National Congress.
