= Khandwa Lok Sabha constituency =

Lok Sabha Constituency in Madhya Pradesh, India

Coordinates: 21.3°N 76.2°E

Khandwa
- Lok Sabha constituency
- Interactive Map Outlining Khandwa Lok Sabha constituency

Constituency details
- Country: India
- Region: Central India
- State: Madhya Pradesh
- Assembly constituencies: Bagli; Mandhata; Khandwa; Pandhana; Nepanagar; Burhanpur; Bhikangaon; Badwaha
- Established: 1952
- Total electors: 21,12,203 (2024)
- Reservation: None

Member of Parliament
- 18th Lok Sabha
- Incumbent Gyaneswar Patil
- Party: Bharatiya Janata Party
- Elected year: 2024

Khandwa Lok Sabha constituency is one of the 29 Lok Sabha constituencies in the Indian state of Madhya Pradesh. This Khandwa constituency came into existence in 1957. It covers the entire Burhanpur district and parts of Dewas, Khandwa and Khargone districts.

== Vidhan Sabha segments ==
Presently, since the delimitation of the parliamentary and legislative assembly constituencies in 2008, Khandwa (खण्डवा) Lok Sabha constituency comprises the following eight Vidhan Sabha (Legislative Assembly) segments:

| # | Name | District | Member | Party | 2024 Lead |
|---|---|---|---|---|---|
| 174 | Bagli (ST) | Dewas | Murli Bhawara | BJP | BJP |
| 175 | Mandhata | Khandwa | Narayan Patel | BJP | BJP |
| 177 | Khandwa (SC) | Khandwa | Kanchan Mukesh Tanve | BJP | BJP |
| 178 | Pandhana (ST) | Khandwa | Chhaya More | BJP | BJP |
| 179 | Nepanagar (ST) | Burhanpur | Manju Rajendra Dadu | BJP | BJP |
| 180 | Burhanpur | Burhanpur | Archna Didi | BJP | INC |
| 181 | Bhikangaon (ST) | Khargone | Jhuma Solanki | INC | BJP |
| 182 | Badwaha | Khargone | Sachin Birla | BJP | BJP |

== Members of Parliament ==
| Year | Member | Party |
|---|---|---|
| 1952 | Babulal Tiwari | Indian National Congress |
| 1957 | Babulal Tiwari | Indian National Congress |
| 1962 | Mahesh Dutta Mishra | Indian National Congress |
| 1967 | Gangacharan Dixit | Indian National Congress |
| 1971 | Gangacharan Dixit | Indian National Congress |
| 1977 | Parmanand Govindjiwala | Janata Party |
| 1979^ | Kushabhau Thakre | Janata Party |
| 1980 | Thakur Shivkumar Singh | Indian National Congress (I) |
| 1984 | Kalicharan Sakargay | Indian National Congress |
| 1989 | Amritlal Tarwala | Bharatiya Janata Party |
| 1991 | Thakur Mahendra Kumar Singh | Indian National Congress |
| 1996 | Nandkumar Singh Chauhan | Bharatiya Janata Party |
| 1998 | Nandkumar Singh Chauhan | Bharatiya Janata Party |
| 1999 | Nandkumar Singh Chauhan | Bharatiya Janata Party |
| 2004 | Nandkumar Singh Chauhan | Bharatiya Janata Party |
| 2009 | Arun Yadav | Indian National Congress |
| 2014 | Nandkumar Singh Chauhan | Bharatiya Janata Party |
| 2019 | Nandkumar Singh Chauhan | Bharatiya Janata Party |
| 2021^ | Gyaneswar Patil | Bharatiya Janata Party |
| 2024 | Gyaneswar Patil | Bharatiya Janata Party |

^ by-poll

== Election results ==
=== 2024 ===
2024 Indian general election: Khandwa
| Party | Candidate | Votes | % | ±% |
|---|---|---|---|---|
| BJP | Gyaneswar Patil | 862,679 | 57.04 | ▲7.19 |
| INC | Narendra Patel | 5,92,708 | 39.19 | ▼4.19 |
| NOTA | None of the above | 12,839 | 0.85 | ▼0.23 |
| BSP | Munnalal | 11,818 | 0.78 | ▼0.25 |
| Majority | | 2,69,971 | 17.85 | ▲11.38 |
| Turnout | | 15,12,542 | 71.61 | ▲7.07 |
| BJP hold | | Swing | | |

=== 2021 Bypoll ===
Bye-election, 2021: Khandwa
| Party | Candidate | Votes | % | ±% |
|---|---|---|---|---|
| BJP | Gyaneswar Patil | 632,455 | 49.85 | −7.29 |
| INC | Raj Narayan Singh Purni | 5,50,315 | 43.38 | +4.86 |
| BTP | Darasingh Patel Khatawase | 17,564 | 1.38 | New |
| IND | Dr. Haresingh Gurjar | 17,463 | 1.38 | New |
| NOTA | None of the above | 13,653 | 1.08 | −0.01 |
| Majority | | 82,140 | 6.47 | |
| Turnout | | 12,70,743 | 64.54 | |
| BJP hold | | Swing | | |

=== General Elections 2019 ===
2019 Indian general elections: Khandwa
| Party | Candidate | Votes | % | ±% |
|---|---|---|---|---|
| BJP | Nandkumar Singh Chauhan | 8,38,909 | 57.14 | +0.10 |
| INC | Arun Subash Chandra Yadav | 5,65,566 | 38.52 | +2.13 |
| NOTA | None of the Above | 16,005 | 1.09 | −0.27 |
| BSP | Dayaram Korku | 14,888 | 1.01 | −0.08 |
| Majority | | 2,73,343 | 18.62 | |
| Turnout | | 14,68,156 | 76.90 | +5.42 |
| BJP hold | | Swing | | |

2014 Indian general elections: Khandwa
| Party | Candidate | Votes | % | ±% |
|---|---|---|---|---|
| BJP | Nandkumar Singh Chauhan | 7,17,357 | 57.04 | +14.59 |
| INC | Arun Subash Chandra Yadav | 4,57,643 | 36.39 | −12.09 |
| NOTA | None of the Above | 17,149 | 1.36 | |
| AAP | Alok Agarwal | 16,799 | 1.34 | |
| BSP | Sanjay Laxman Solanki | 13,691 | 1.09 | |
| IND | Baba Abdul Hamid | 12,036 | 0.96 | −1.96 |
| Majority | | 2,59,714 | 20.65 | |
| Turnout | | 12,57,711 | 71.48 | |
| BJP gain from INC | | Swing | | |

=== General Elections 2009 ===
2009 Indian general elections: Khandwa
| Party | Candidate | Votes | % | ±% |
|---|---|---|---|---|
| INC | Arun Subhashchandra Yadav | 3,94,241 | 48.48 | |
| BJP | Nandkumar Singh Chauhan | 3,45,160 | 42.45 | |
| IND | Baba Abdul Hameed | 23,716 | 2.92 | |
| CPI | Haji Zakir Hussain Durrany Engineer | 23,716 | 2.92 | |
| Majority | | 49,801 | 6.04 | |
| Turnout | | 8,13,396 | 60.01 | |
| INC gain from BJP | | Swing | | |

=== General Elections 1977 ===
- Parmanand Thakurdas Govindjiwala (Janata) : 182,031
- Gangacharan Dixit (INC) : 128,008

==== Bye-poll 1979 ====
- Kushabhau Thakre (JNP) : 192,280
- S.N.Thakur (INC-I) : 153,794

=== General Elections 1971 ===
- Gangacharan Dikshit (Indian National Congress) : 143,124 votes
- Virendra Kumar Anand (Bharatiya Jana Sangh) : 102,234

== See also ==
- Khandwa district
- List of constituencies of the Lok Sabha
