= Burhanpur Assembly constituency =

Constituency of the Madhya Pradesh legislative assembly in India

Coordinates: 21.32°N 76.22°E

Burhanpur
- Constituency No. 180 for the Madhya Pradesh Legislative Assembly

Constituency details
- Country: India
- Region: Central India
- State: Madhya Pradesh
- District: Burhanpur
- Lok Sabha constituency: Khandwa
- Reservation: None

Member of Legislative Assembly
- 16th Madhya Pradesh Legislative Assembly
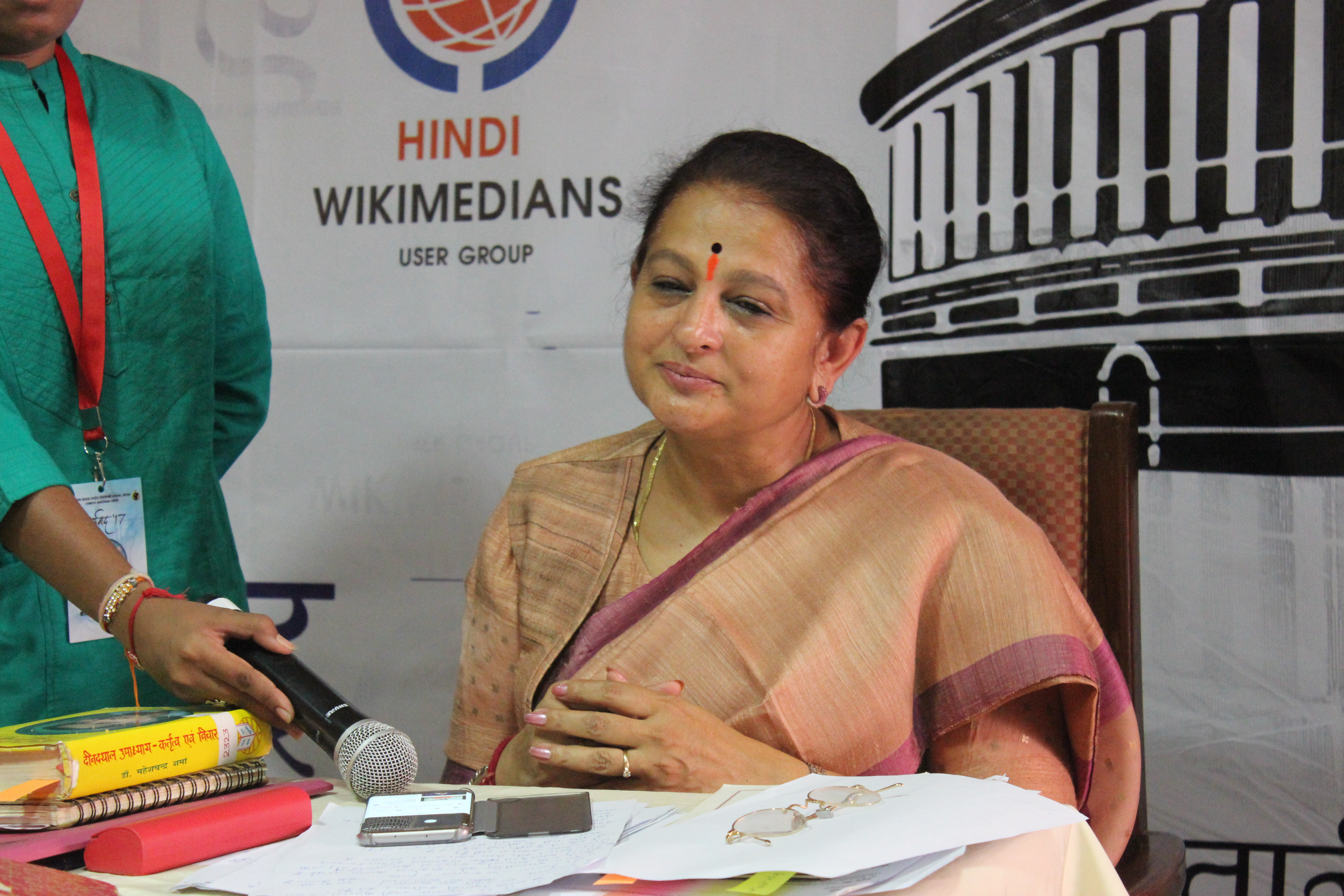
- Incumbent Archana Chitnis
- Party: Bharatiya Janata Party
- Elected year: 2023
- Preceded by: Surendra Singh Thakur

Burhanpur Assembly constituency is one of the 230 Vidhan Sabha (Legislative Assembly) constituencies of Madhya Pradesh state in central India.

It is a part of Burhanpur District. The current member of the Legislative Assembly is Archana Chitnis, from BJP.

== Members of Legislative Assembly ==
Election	Member	Party
1952	Abdul Qadir Siddiqui	Indian National Congress
1957	Abdul Qadir Siddiqui	Indian National Congress
1962	Abdul Qadir Siddiqui	Indian National Congress
1967	Parmanand	Bharatiya Jana Sangh
1972	Brijmohan Mishra	Bharatiya Jana Sangh
1977	Thakur Shivkumar Singh	Indian National Congress
1980	Mohammad Haroon	Indian National Congress (Indira)
1985	Firoza Ahsan Ali	Indian National Congress
1990	Thakur Shivkumar Singh	Independent politician
1993	Mahant Swami Umesh	Independent politician
1998	Thakur Shiv Kumar Singh	Independent politician
2003	Hamid Qazi	Nationalist Congress Party
2008	Archana Chitnis	Bharatiya Janata Party
2013	Archana Chitnis	Bharatiya Janata Party
2018	Thakur Surendra Singh	Independent politician
2023	Archana Chitnis	Bharatiya Janata Party

== Election results ==
=== 2023 ===
2023 Madhya Pradesh Legislative Assembly election: Burhanpur
Party	Candidate	Votes	%	±%
BJP	Archana Chitnis	100,397	40.67	▼1.87
INC	Thakur Surendra Singh	69,226	28.04	▲21.04
Independent	Harshvardhan Chouhan	35,435	14.36	
AIMIM	Nafees Mansha Khan	33,853	13.71	
NOTA	None of the above	2,583	1.05	▼1.56
Majority		31,171	12.63	▲10.3
Turnout		246,842	77.06	▲0.12
BJP gain from Independent		Swing		

=== 2018 ===
2018 Madhya Pradesh Legislative Assembly election: Burhanpur
Party	Candidate	Votes	%	±%
Independent	Thakur Surendra Singh	98,561	44.87	
BJP	Archana Chitnis	93,441	42.54	
INC	Ravindra Suka Mahajan	15,369	7.00	
BSP	Manoj Pawar	3,559	1.62	
NOTA	None of the above	5,726	2.61	
Majority		5,120	2.33	
Turnout		219,675	76.94	
Independent gain from BJP		Swing		

=== 2013 ===
2013 Madhya Pradesh Legislative Assembly election: Burhanpur
Party	Candidate	Votes	%	±%
BJP	Archana Chitnis	104,426	52.86	
INC	Ajay Singh Raghuvanshi	81,599	41.30	
NOTA	None of the Above	3,925	1.99	
NCP	Fariduddin Qazi	2,053	1.04	
BSP	Abdul Irshad Qureshi	1,970	1.00	
Majority		22,827	11.79	
Turnout		1,97,739	75.11	
BJP hold		Swing		

== See also ==
- Burhanpur
