= Gyaneswar Patil =

Indian politician

Gyaneshwar Patil

Member of Parliament, Lok Sabha
- Incumbent
- Assumed office 2 November 2021
- Preceded by: Nandkumar Singh Chauhan
- Constituency: Khandwa

Personal details
- Party: Bharatiya Janata Party
- Education: B.Com
- Alma mater: Indira Gandhi National Open University
- Profession: Farmer

Gyaneshwar Patil (Hindi pronunciation: [gjaːn̪eːʃʋəɾ paːʈɪl]) is an Indian politician and a Member of Parliament from Khandwa parliamentary constituency of Madhya Pradesh state. He successfully contested the 2021 by-poll from Khandwa Lok sabha seat from the Bharatiya Janata Party, after the demise of Nandkumar Singh Chauhan due to complications from COVID-19. He won against the Raj Narayan Singh Purni by 82,140 votes.

In the 2024 Lok Sabha Election Patil won with 8,62,679 votes. He defeated INC's Narendra Patel by 269648 votes.
