= Chillara =

Village in Madhya Pradesh, India

Coordinates: 21°11′49″N 76°27′32″E

Chillara is a village in Burhanpur district of Madhya Pradesh state of India.
