= Amritlal Tarwala =

Indian politician

Member of Parliament, Lok Sabha
- In office 1989–1991
- Preceded by: Kalicharan Ramratan Sakargay
- Succeeded by: Thakur Mahendra Kumar Nawal Singh
- Constituency: Khandwa, Madhya Pradesh

Personal details
- Party: Bharatiya Janata Party
- Spouse: Suda Tarwala

Amritlal Vallabhdas Tarwala is an Indian politician. He was elected to the Lok Sabha, lower house of the Parliament of India from Khandwa, Madhya Pradesh as a member of the Bharatiya Janata Party.
