= Arun Subhashchandra Yadav =

Indian politician

Arun Yadav
- अरुण यादव
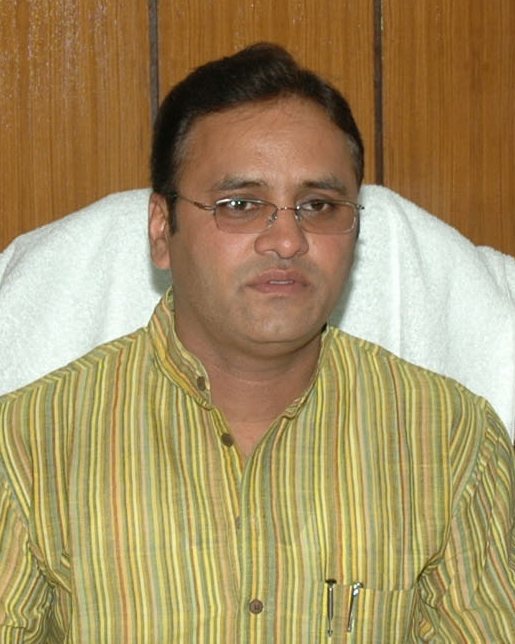
- Arun Yadav in 2009

President of Madhya Pradesh Congress Committee
- In office 2014–2018
- Preceded by: Kantilal Bhuria
- Succeeded by: Kamal Nath

Member of Parliament, Lok Sabha
- In office 2009–2014
- Preceded by: Nandkumar Singh Chauhan
- Succeeded by: Nandkumar Singh Chauhan
- Constituency: Khandwa
- In office 2007–2009
- Preceded by: Krishna Murari Moghe
- Succeeded by: Makhansingh Solanki
- Constituency: Khargone

Union Minister of State for Heavy Industries and Public Enterprises
- In office 2009–2011

Personal details
- Born: 15 January 1974 (age 52) Borawan, Madhya Pradesh, India
- Citizenship: Indian
- Party: Indian National Congress
- Spouse: Dr. Namrata Yadav
- Children: 2
- Parent(s): Late Subhash Yadav (Father) & Damyanti Yadav (Mother).
- Education: S.S. Subdh Jain Commerce College, Jaipur, Rajasthan.
- Occupation: Agriculturist & Politician.

Arun Subhashchandra Yadav (born 15 January 1974) is an Indian politician and former member of the 14th and 15th Lok Sabha. He is a member of Indian National Congress. On 13 January 2014, he was appointed President of Madhya Pradesh Congress Committee.

== Early life and education ==
Arun Yadav is the elder son of Subhash Yadav and Damyanti Yadav. He finished his schooling from Daly College, Indore and graduated with Bachelor of Commerce from S.S. Subadh Jain Commerce College, Jaipur, Rajasthan.

== Posts held ==
#	From	To	Position
01	2007	2009	Elected to 14th Lok Sabha
02	2008	2009	Member, Committee on Public Accounts
03	2009	2014	Re-elected to 15th Lok Sabha (2nd term)
04	2009	2011	Union Minister of State, Heavy Industries and Public Enterprises
05	2011	2011	Union Minister of State, Agriculture and Food Processing Industries

== See also ==
- List of members of the 15th Lok Sabha of India
