= Nandkumar Singh Chauhan =

Indian politician (1952–2021)

Member of Parliament, Lok Sabha
- In office 2014–2021
- Preceded by: Arun Subhashchandra Yadav
- Succeeded by: Gyaneswar Patil
- Constituency: Khandwa
- In office 1996–2009
- Preceded by: Thakur Mahendra Kumar Nawal Singh
- Succeeded by: Arun Subhashchandra Yadav
- Constituency: Khandwa

President of Bharatiya Janata Party, Madhya Pradesh
- In office 16 August 2014 – 18 April 2018
- Preceded by: Narendra Singh Tomar
- Succeeded by: Rakesh Singh

Personal details
- Born: 8 September 1952 Burhanpur, Madhya Pradesh, India
- Died: 1 March 2021 (aged 68) Gurgaon, Haryana, India
- Party: Bharatiya Janata Party
- Spouse: Durgeshri
- Children: 1 son and 2 daughters
- Education: B. A.
- As of 22 September, 2006

Nandkumar Singh Chauhan (8 September 1952 – 2 March 2021; Hindi pronunciation: [n̪ən̪d̪ kʊmaːɾ sɪŋgʱ t͡ʃɔːɦaːn̪]) was a politician from the Indian state of Madhya Pradesh, belonging to Bharatiya Janata Party. He was a member of Lok Sabha from Khandwa at the time of his death.

== Biography ==
His first major foray in politics was from the now-defunct Shahpur Vidhan Sabha constituency, once a segment of Khandwa Lok Sabha seat. He first contested Madhya Pradesh Vidhan Sabha election from Shahpur in 1980, as a candidate of BJP, but lost that time. He was first elected to Madhya Pradesh Vidhan Sabha from Shahpur in 1985, and was re-elected in 1990 and 1993. He vacated the assembly seat when he was elected to Lok Sabha in 1996 from Khandwa (Lok Sabha constituency). He was elected to Lok Sabha six times from Khandwa, in 1996, 1998, 1999, 2004, 2014 (16th Lok Sabha) and 2019, losing only in 2009.

Nandkumar Chauhan, sometimes spelled 'Chouhan', was BJP state president of Madhya Pradesh up to 18 April 2018 when he was replaced by Jabalpur MP Rakesh Singh.

Nand Kumar Chauhan died from complications from COVID-19 during the COVID-19 pandemic in India at Medanta Hospital in Gurgaon on 2 March 2021, at age 68.

Lok Sabha
Preceded by Thakur Mahendra Kumar Singh Nawal Singh	Member of Parliament for Khandwa; 1996 – 2009	Succeeded by Arun Subhashchandra Yadav
Preceded by Arun Subhashchandra Yadav	Member of Parliament for Khandwa; 2014 – 2021	Succeeded by Vacant
