= Badwaha Assembly constituency =

Constituency of the Madhya Pradesh legislative assembly in India

Coordinates: 22.25°N 76.04°E

Badwaha
- Constituency No. 182 for the Madhya Pradesh Legislative Assembly

Constituency details
- Country: India
- Region: Central India
- State: Madhya Pradesh
- District: Khargone
- Lok Sabha constituency: Khandwa
- Established: 2008
- Reservation: None

Member of Legislative Assembly
- 16th Madhya Pradesh Legislative Assembly
- Incumbent Sachin Birla
- Party: Bharatiya Janata Party
- Elected year: 2023
- Preceded by: Hitendra Singh Solanki

Badwaha Assembly constituency is one of the 230 Vidhan Sabha (Legislative Assembly) constituencies of Madhya Pradesh state in central India.

It is part of Khargone District.

== Members of Legislative Assembly ==
The current MLA is Sachin Birla.

Election	Name	Party
2008	Hitendra Singh Solanki	Bharatiya Janata Party
2013	Hitendra Singh Solanki	Bharatiya Janata Party
2018	Sachin Birla	Indian National Congress
2023	Sachin Birla	Bharatiya Janata Party

== Election results ==
=== 2023 ===
2023 Madhya Pradesh Legislative Assembly election: Badwaha
Party	Candidate	Votes	%	±%
BJP	Sachin Birla	90,467	49.66	+11.05
INC	Narendra Patel	84,968	46.64	−9.89
BSP	Trilok Rathor	2,942	1.61	+0.73
NOTA	None of the above	1,542	0.85	−0.06
Majority		5,499	3.02	−14.9
Turnout		182,184	78.52	−2.86
BJP gain from INC		Swing		

=== 2018 ===
2018 Madhya Pradesh Legislative Assembly election: Badwaha
Party	Candidate	Votes	%	±%
INC	Sachin Birla	96,230	56.53	
BJP	Hitendra Singh Solanki	65,722	38.61	
Independent	Subodh Sharma	1,599	0.94	
NOTA	None of the above	1,553	0.91	
Majority		30,508	17.92	
Turnout		170,239	81.38	
INC gain from BJP		Swing		

=== 2013 ===
2013 Madhya Pradesh Legislative Assembly election: Badwaha
Party	Candidate	Votes	%	±%
BJP	Hitendra Singh Solanki	67,600	43.82	
IND	Sachin Birla	61,970	40.17	
INC	Rajendra Singh Solanki	14,323	9.28	
BSP	Kailash Rokde	3,273	2.12	
NOTA	None of the Above	2,897	1.88	
Majority		5,630	3.72	
Turnout		1,54,346	79.80	
BJP hold		Swing		
