= Khaknar =

Town in Madhya Pradesh

- Town
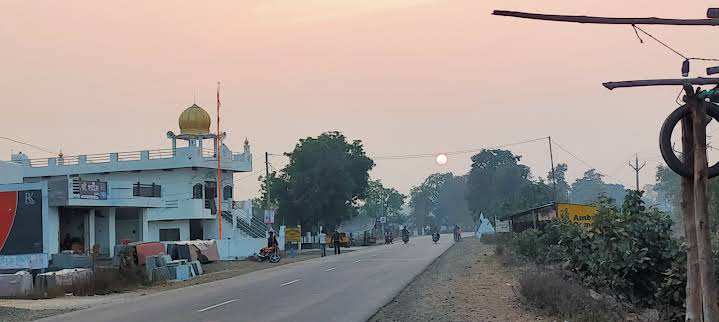
- Khaknar Town View

- Location in Madhya Pradesh, India
- Coordinates: 21.36°N 76.56°E
- Country: India
- State: Madhya Pradesh
- District: Burhanpur

Khaknar is a town and a tehsil in Burhanpur District of Madhya Pradesh.

Khaknar is located 42 km away from Burhanpur in east side.

As per Census of India 2011 Khaknar Town had population of 6,581. Major languages of the town are Marathi, Nimari, Hindi and some dialect are Gurjar and khandeshi.
