= Upper Gangetic Plains moist deciduous forests =

Ecoregion in northern India

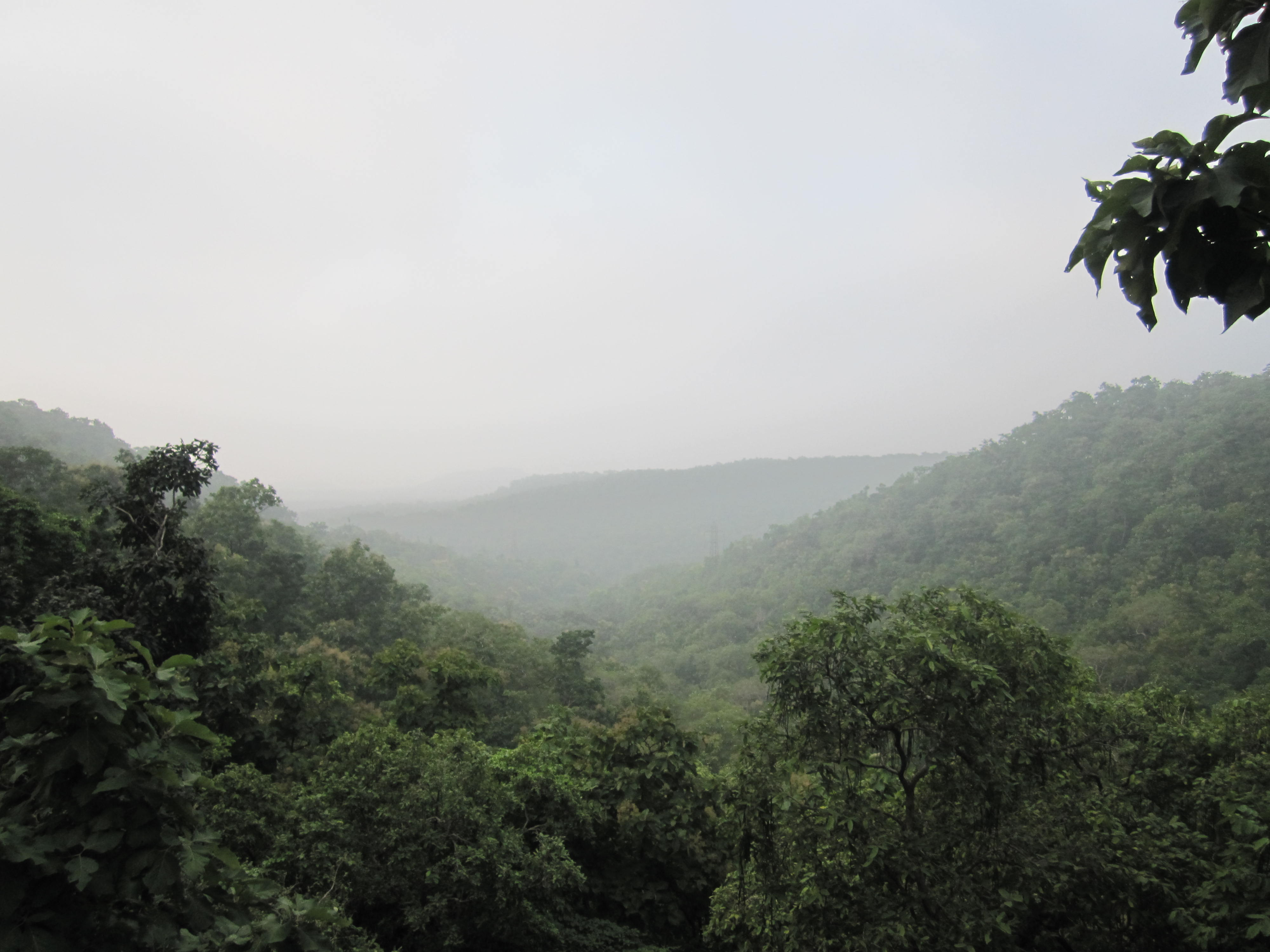
- Hills near Kanpur

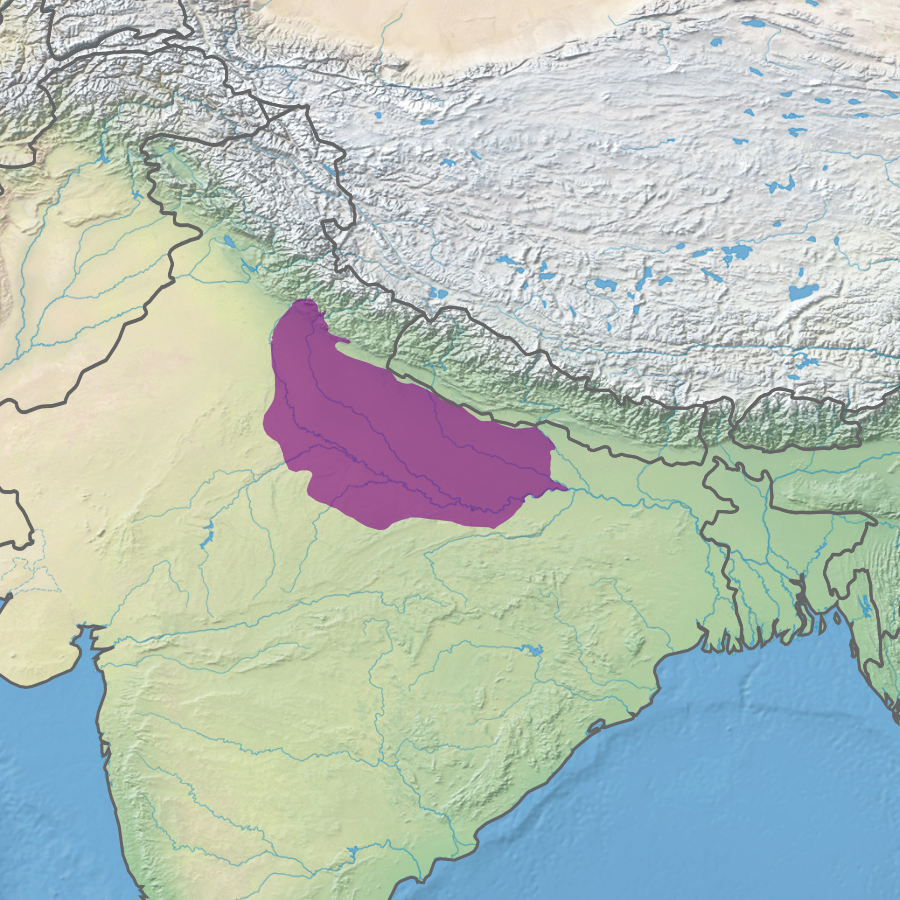
- Ecoregion territory (in purple)

Ecology
- Realm: Indomalayan
- Biome: tropical and subtropical moist broadleaf forests
- Borders: List: Himalayan subtropical broadleaf forests; Himalayan subtropical pine forests; Khathiar–Gir dry deciduous forests; Lower Gangetic Plains moist deciduous forests; Narmada Valley dry deciduous forests; Northwestern thorn scrub forests

Geography
- Area: 262,642 km^{2} (101,407 mi^{2})
- Countries: India; Nepal
- States: Bihar; Delhi; Haryana; Madhya Pradesh; Rajasthan; Uttar Pradesh, Uttarakhand

Conservation
- Conservation status: critical/endangered
- Protected: 3,544 km^{2} (1%)

The Upper Gangetic Plains moist deciduous forests is a tropical and subtropical moist broadleaf forests ecoregion of northern India.

== Geography ==
It lies on the alluvial plain of the Ganges and Yamuna rivers, with an area of 263,100 square kilometers (101,600 sq mi), covering most of the state of Uttar Pradesh and adjacent portions of Uttarakhand, Haryana, Madhya Pradesh and Bihar; as well as a minuscule adjacent portion of southern Nepal.

The ecoregion is bounded on the north by the Himalayan subtropical pine forests, Terai-Duar savannas and grasslands and Himalayan subtropical broadleaf forests of the Himalaya foothills, to the west by the drier Northwestern thorn scrub forests and Khathiar-Gir dry deciduous forests, on the south by the Narmada Valley dry deciduous forests of the Malwa and Bundelkhand uplands, and on the east by the more humid Lower Gangetic Plains moist deciduous forests.

The ecoregion is home to several large cities, including Delhi, Agra, Kanpur, Lucknow, Gwalior, and Varanasi.

== Climate ==
The ecoregion has a subtropical climate. Rainfall is highly seasonal, falling mainly during the June-to-September southwest monsoon.

== Flora ==
In ancient times the region was mostly covered with moist semi deciduous forests, with trees that lose their leaves during the winter dry season. sal (Shorea robusta) is predominant tree. Mature trees form a canopy 25 to 35 metres. Other trees include Terminalia tomentosa, Terminalia belerica, Lagerstroemia parviflora, Adina cordifolia, Dillenia pentagyna, Stereospermum suaveolens, and Ficus spp.

Where the land has been disturbed by flood, fire, or livestock grazing there are areas of grassland or savanna, with the grasses Saccharum spontaneum, Saccharum narenga, Saccharum benghalense, and Vetiveria zizanioides.

== Fauna ==
There are 79 known species of mammals in the ecoregion. Large mammals, including tiger (Panthera tigris), Indian rhinoceros (Rhinoceros unicornis), Asian elephant (Elephas maximus), wild water buffalo (Bubalus arnee), chousingha (Tetracerus quadricornis), swamp deer (Rucervus duvaucelii), and sloth bear (Melursus ursinus), once roamed the ecoregion. Habitat destruction has mostly extirpated them from the ecoregion. Small populations of tiger, Asian elephant, sloth bear, and chousingha persist in the few remaining forested areas at the foot of the Himalayas.

There are over 290 species of birds, including the Indian grassbird, bristled grassbird, lesser florican (Sypheotides indicus), Indian grey hornbill (Ocyceros birostris), and Oriental pied hornbill (Anthracoceros albirostris).

Wetlands along the Ganges River and its tributaries support communities of resident and migrant waterfowl, along with mugger crocodile (Crocodylus palustris) and gharial (Gavialis gangeticus). The ecoregion's large rivers are home to the endangered Ganges river dolphin (Platanista gangetica gangetica).

== Conservation ==
The ecoregion is currently densely populated, and the fertile plains have largely been converted to intensive agriculture, with only a few enclaves of forest remaining.

A 2017 assessment found that 3,544 km^{2}, or 1%, of the ecoregion is in protected areas. Protected areas in the ecoregion include:

- Pilibhit tiger reserve
- Jim Corbett National Park
- National Chambal Sanctuary
- Rajaji National Park
- Hastinapur Wildlife Sanctuary
- Karera Wildlife Sanctuary
- Ranipur Sanctuary
- Ken Gharial Sanctuary
- Kishanpur Wildlife Sanctuary
- Sohagi Barwa Wildlife Sanctuary

== See also ==
- Ecoregions of India
