= Dhulkot =

Village in Madhya Pradesh

- Town
- Location in Madhya Pradesh, India
- Coordinates: 21.49°N 76.17°E
- Country: India
- State: Madhya Pradesh
- District: Burhanpur

Population
  - Total: 8,809

Dhulkot is a town located in Nepanagar Tehsil of Burhanpur District in Madhya Pradesh. It is 34 km away from District Headquarter Burhanpur.

According to the 2011 Census of India, Dhulkot has a population of 8,809, of which 4,496 are males and 4,313 are females. The Pin Code of Dhulkot is 450331.
