= Singhori Wildlife Sanctuary =

Wildlife sanctuary in India

- IUCN category IV (habitat/species management area)
- Location within Madhya Pradesh Location within India
- Interactive map of Singhori Wildlife Sanctuary
- Location: Raisen district, Madhya Pradesh, India
- Coordinates: 23°10′40″N 78°10′35″E
- Area: 287.91 km^{2} (111.16 sq mi)
- Established: 1976

Singhori Wildlife Sanctuary is a protected area located in the Bari Tehsil of the Raisen district in the state of Madhya Pradesh, India. It was officially notified on 2 July 1976. It is part of the Ratapani tiger reserve. Two main seasonal rivers, the Ghoghara and the Barna, flow through the sanctuary. Fauna of the Sanctuary include mammals like Bengal Tiger, Indian Leopard, Chital, Sambhar, Wild boar etc. The forests in the sanctuary are Tropical Dry deciduous forests.
