= Aner Dam =

Dam in Shirpur, India

- Location within Maharashtra
- Official name: Aner Dam
- Location: Shirpur
- Coordinates: 21.3250174°N 75.1442957°E
- Opening date: 1978
- Owners: Government of Maharashtra, India

Dam and spillways
- Type of dam: Earthfill
- Impounds: Aner river
- Height: 47 m (154 ft)
- Length: 2,275 m (7,464 ft)
- Dam volume: 3,162,000 m^{3} (111,700,000 cu ft)

Reservoir
- Total capacity: 58,914,000 m^{3} (2.0805×10^{9} cu ft)

Aner Dam, is an earthfill dam on Aner river in Shirpur taluka, Dhule district in state of Maharashtra in India. The dam is 8 km from Hisale village which is situated near Shirpur-Chopda state highway in Shirpur Tehsil.

== Specifications ==
The height of the dam above lowest foundation is 47 m (154 ft) while the length is 2,275 m (7,464 ft). The volume content is 3,162,000 m^{3} (111,700,000 cu ft) and gross storage capacity is 10,327,000 m^{3} (364,700,000 cu ft).

== Purpose ==
- Irrigation

== See also ==
- Dams in Maharashtra
- List of reservoirs and dams in India
