= Sachin Birla =

Indian politician (born 1979)

Sachin Birla (born 1979) is an Indian politician from Madhya Pradesh. He is a second time MLA from Barwah Assembly constituency in Khargone District. He won the 2023 Madhya Pradesh Legislative Assembly election, representing the Bharatiya Janata Party.

== Early life and education ==
Birla is from Barwah, Khargone District, Madhya Pradesh. He is the son of Amraji Birla. He completed his B.A. at a college affiliated with Devi Ahilya university, Indore.

== Career ==
Birla won from Barwah Assembly constituency in the 2023 Madhya Pradesh Legislative Assembly election representing the Bharatiya Janata Party. He polled 90,467 votes and defeated his nearest rival, Narendra Patel of the Indian National Congress, by a margin of 5,499 votes. He became an MLA for the first time winning the 2018 Madhya Pradesh Legislative Assembly election on Indian National Congress ticket
