= Sumitra Devi Kasdekar =

Indian politician

Member of Madhya Pradesh Legislative Assembly
- Incumbent
- Assumed office 2018
- Preceded by: Manju Dadu
- Constituency: Nepanagar

Personal details
- Party: Bharatiya Janata Party
- Other political affiliations: Indian National Congress
- Profession: Agriculture

Sumitra Devi Kasdekar is an Indian politician. She was elected to the Madhya Pradesh Legislative Assembly from Nepanagar. She was an elected member of the Madhya Pradesh Legislative Assembly as a member of the Indian National Congress. She left the Indian National Congress in August 2020 and on the same day, she joined Bharatiya Janata Party.
