= Strobilanthes halbergii =

Scientific classification
- Kingdom: Plantae
- Clade: Tracheophytes
- Clade: Angiosperms
- Clade: Eudicots
- Clade: Asterids
- Order: Lamiales
- Family: Acanthaceae
- Genus: Strobilanthes
- Species: S. halbergii

Binomial name
- Strobilanthes halbergii Blatt.

Species of plant

Strobilanthes halbergii is a species of plant in the family Acanthaceae. It is a shrub that is native to northwestern India, growing in a seasonally dry tropical biome. The species was first described in 1931.
