= Archana Chitnis =

Indian politician

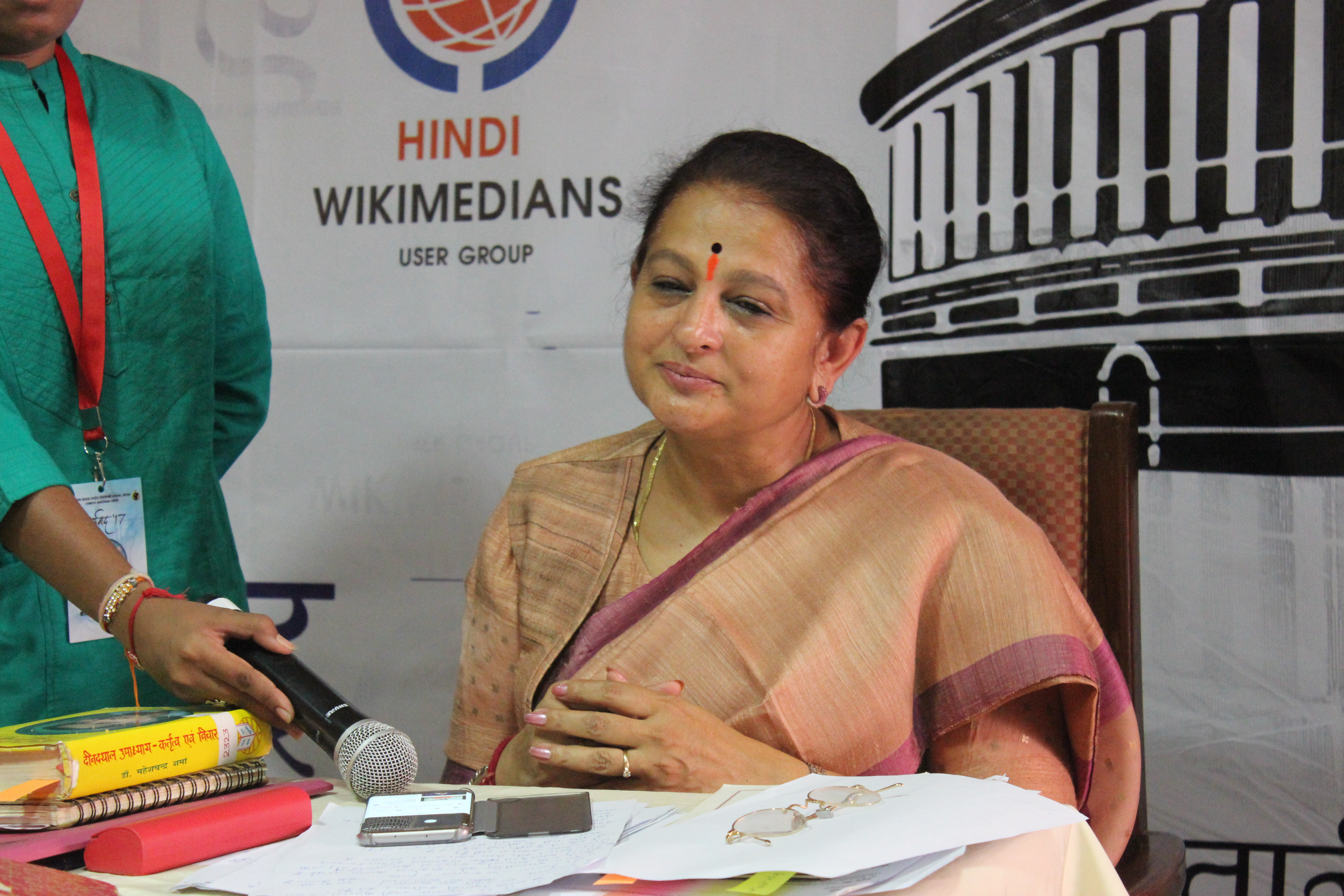

Member of the Madhya Pradesh Legislative Assembly
- Incumbent
- Assumed office 3 December 2023
- Preceded by: Thakur Surendra Singh
- Constituency: Burhanpur
- In office 2008 – December 2018
- Preceded by: Hamid Kaji
- Constituency: Burhanpur

Minister of Women and Child Development, Madhya Pradesh Government
- In office June 2016 – December 2018
- Chief Minister: Shivraj Singh Chouhan
- Succeeded by: Imarti Devi

Personal details
- Born: 20 April 1964 (age 61)
- Party: Bharatiya Janata Party
- Education: M.Sc, B.Ed
- Profession: Politician
- Website: archnachitnis.com
- Source

Archana Chitnis (born 20 April 1964) is a Bharatiya Janata Party politician from Madhya Pradesh. She is a member of Madhya Pradesh Legislative Assembly representing Burhanpur (Vidhan Sabha constituency) and has served as Minister of Education of the state. She returned to Shivraj Singh Chouhan's Cabinet as Minister of Women and Child Development. She won the 2023 Madhya Pradesh Legislative Assembly election against Thakur Surendra Singh from Burhanpur.

== Early life ==
Entry into students politics in 1984, University Representative of Devi Ahilya University, Indore and Secretary of Government Degree College Student Union in 1984–85. Former lecturer of Gujarati Science College, Indore.

== Political career ==
In 2003, she was elected to the 12th Vidhan Sabha and served as the Minister for Women and Child Development, Social Welfare, Higher Education, Technical Education and Training, Animal Husbandry, Cow Promotion Board, and Social Justice. She was elected as a Member of the 13th Vidhan Sabha in 2008 and appointed as the Minister of Technical Education and Training, School Education, and Higher Education.

She was elected for the third time as MLA in the year 2013. On 30 June 2016, Archana Chitnis was inducted as a Cabinet Minister in the cabinet of Chief Minister Shivraj Singh Chouhan.
