= Sardarpur Wildlife Sanctuary =

Coordinates: 22.747°N 74.913°E

- IUCN category IV (habitat/species management area)
- Location within Madhya Pradesh Location within India
- Interactive map of Sardarpur Wildlife Sanctuary
- Location: Dhar district, Madhya Pradesh, India
- Area: 348.12 km^{2} (134.41 sq mi)
- Established: 1983

Sardarpur Wildlife Sanctuary is a protected area located in Dhar district, of Madhya Pradesh in India. It was officially notified in 1983. Originally, the sanctuary covered approximately 348 km² (34,800 ha). The landscape is dominated by open grasslands with patches of scrub and seasonal wetlands habitats. The sanctuary was created primarily to protect the critically endangered bird the lesser florican (Sypheotides indicus) locally known as the kharmor or kharmour, which depends on this specific type of grassland habitat for its survival.

This endeavour did not succeed, as a result in large part of human interference and climate change, and the lesser florican is believed to be on the verge f extinction in this area, if it has not already become extinct, although other bird species have done better here.

In 2025 the Government of Madhya Pradesh approved a reorganisation of the protected area that involved denotification of most of the earlier revenue land and the notification of a much smaller area (about 16.82 km²) to remain as a sanctuary.
