= Maheshdutta Chandragopal Mishra =

Indian politician

Maheshdutta Chandragopal Mishra (20 February 1913 – 11 November 2006) was an Indian politician. He was the son of Chandra Gopal Mishra, a prominent freedom fighter.

An Indian National Congress activist since his child years and a close associate of Mahatma Gandhi from 1941 onwards, Mishra worked as his private secretary at the time of Gandhi's death.

Mishra was one of two Kisan Mazdoor Praja Party candidates elected from the Harda constituency in the 1951-52 Madhya Pradesh Legislative Assembly election. He obtained 17,029 votes.

He contested the Jabalpur Lok Sabha seat in the 1957 general election, as a Praja Socialist Party candidate. He finished in second place with 44,259 votes (30.54% of the votes in the constituency).

He was elected to the Lok Sabha (lower house of the parliament of India) from the Khandwa seat in the 1962 general election, standing as an Indian National Congress candidate. He obtained 105,889 votes (46.09%), defeating Bharatiya Jana Sangh and Praja Socialist Party candidates in the fray.

Mishra worked for thirteen years as a teacher in political science at Allahabad University. As of 1976 he served as Professor and Head of the Department of Political Science at Jabalpur University.

Mishra died on 11 November 2006 in Harda.
