= Nepanagar =

- Town
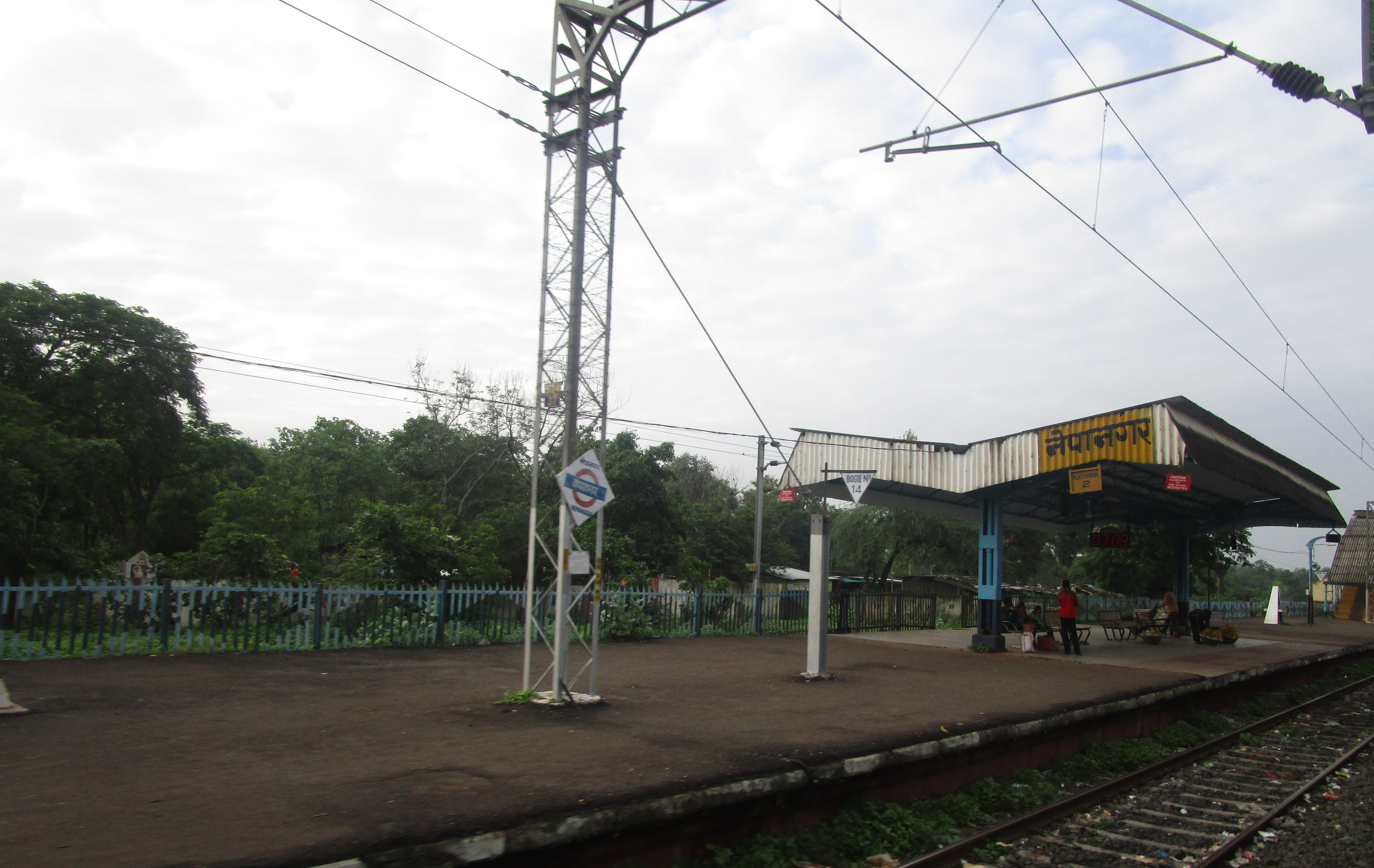
- Nepanagar Railway Station

- Location in Madhya Pradesh, India
- Coordinates: 21°27′21″N 76°26′58″E
- Country: India
- State: Madhya Pradesh
- District: Burhanpur

Population (2011)
  - Total: 29,682
- Time zone: UTC+5:30 (IST)
- Postal code: 450221

Nepanagar is an industrial township in Burhanpur district in the Indian state of Madhya Pradesh. Nepanagar is famous for its newsprint paper mill, Nepa Mills Limited (earlier known as The National News Print Ltd). Nepa Mill is Asia's first paper mill which was inaugurated by Pandit Jawaharlal Nehru on 26 April 1956.

The small township falls between Burhanpur and Khandwa and is surrounded by many small villages. This place is accessible by the mainline railway that runs between Bhusawal Junction and Itarsi Junction. Nepanagar is also accessible by road from the route going to Burhanpur. At Asirgarh the road bifurcates into a fairly well maintained road that goes to Nepanagar. The total distance is 14 km.

The Nepa mill area is covered in 107 acres of land and township 1762 acres totaling 1869 acres of land. There is a well-developed township in Nepa, which is equipped with all the facilities. The Company has 2164 residential quarters in the township.

== History ==
NEPA pioneered the manufacturing of newsprint in the country. It was founded in 1948 and start its commenced production in April 1956 with an installed capacity of 30,000 TPA. the main raw materials were Salai wood and Bamboo which were available in abundance in the forests around Nepanagar.

The mill embarked upon major expansion programmes in 1967 and subsequently in 1978 and 1989 to increase its installed capacity to 88,000 TPA. Presently, the Company has switched to Waste paper as basic raw material from the original forest-based and has thus been able to reduce the cost of production. The in-house modifications/alterations to the pulping plants have also helped in processing various quality waste papers to manufacture Newsprint. Mills is meeting its 100% requirement from Captive Power generation.

Originally NEPA was a single product Company producing standard Newsprint. The Company has produced for the first time in India, 42 GSM newsprint meeting all international parameters of strength, opacity, surface smoothness, brightness etc. Thus, NEPA is now able to meet the demand across all categories of Newsprint customers.

NEPA has also recently initiated the manufacture of Economy newsprint by using old newspaper and overissue newspaper to cater to the requirement of the lowest segments of the market at minimal cost, yet maintaining all other parameters of quality though in lower brightness. The factor that is responsible for this paper industry is the river Tapti.

== Demographics ==
Religion in Nepanagar
	Percent
Hindus	80.49%
Muslims	10.20%
Buddhist	7.25%
Christians	1.28%
Others	0.77%

As of the 2011 Census of India, Nepanagar had a population of 29,682.

== Educational institutes ==
This town has a number of schools & colleges providing education to students of town and surrounding villages. Prominent among these are Kendriya Vidyalaya nepanagar, Nepa Higher Secondary School, Citizen Higher Secondary School, St. A.G. Convent School, PJN Government College, ITI college & Government School, Nepanagar Institute of Computer Sciences

== Scenario ==
Nepamill was floated by M/s Nair Press Syndicate Limited, a private entrepreneur, on 25 January 1947, the first Newsprint Mill in the country. The company is serving the nation for the last 50 years. After 50 years of existence and remaining for the first 35 years as the only newsprint-manufacturing mill in the country conserving the then scarce foreign exchange, Nepa Limited is one of the oldest Public Sector Undertakings.

Nepa Ltd is in the ranges of Satpura, 525 km northeast of Mumbai at Nepanagar. The Company was taken over by the Government of Central Province and Berar at present Madhya Pradesh in October 1949. The commercial production commenced on 26 April 1956. Subsequently, the Government of India took over controlling interest in 1958. Till 16 August 1996, NEPA was using wood pulp for paper-making. The mill has successfully switched over operations with only waste paper recycling route.

== Historical places ==
=== Asirgarh Fort ===
The Asirgarh Fort, at a distance about 17 km by road, has its importance in history and was known as 'Gateway to South (Dakshin ka Dwaar)'. It was so because whoever wants to win the south had to win and pass through it. A victory over this fortress meant the kingdom of Khandesh, which in turn meant a smooth road to Deccan. It was considered as an impregnable fortress during Mugal Period.

The ownership of the fort between the 14th-16th Century was in hands of Adil Shah Farouqui. After him, the fort passed on to his successor Bahadur Shah Faroqui who was not considered as a farsighted king. As soon as Akbar learned of this he dispatched an army to conquer Asirgarh Fort. Bahadur Shah got the wind of Akbar's plans and he too proceeded swiftly and fortified his fortress. Consequently, the armies of the Mughal emperor were stuck here laying siege to the fort for almost 10 years.

It is evidence of how well-stocked the fortress was during that time that people and the army inside had enough provision for food and water. Every attempt to take the fort was repulsed by the soldiers of the Shah. Finally sick of the battle, Akbar one day called Bahadur Shah to his camp for a meeting and there had him summarily dispatched to happy hunting grounds above.

When the dying king accused Akbar of treachery, the emperor replied with that age-old lesson, "Everything is fair in politics and government." Later Akbar showered gold and silver on Bahadur Shah's generals and won his way through to the fort. Finally, on 17 January 1601 Akbar became the lord of the Asirgarh fort. Since then the fort remained in the hands of the Mughals.

The fortress is home to a tenth-century temple of Shiva. Asha mandir of Hindu Goddess Asha-devi is located on the hills of this village. In the vicinity of Asirgarh, there is a tomb of Shah Nomani Asiri, a saint, a believer of Sufism. Moti Mahal, the burial place of Moti Begam, beloved of Shah Jahan is to the left of the fort and situated at the bank of Pandhar River.

== Mythology ==
'Sita-Nahaani' in the nearby village 'Bid' has its relations with 'Ramaayan'. It is said that Lord Shri Ram while in 'Vanvaas' once stayed at this place where Sita took bath. The source of sweet water here is said to be made by the arrow of Lord Shri Ram.

The Shiv Temple at Asirgarh Fort is known by the people as the place where 'Ashwaththama' (the son of Dronacharaya, Mahabharat epic) used to visit regularly (even today) to worship Lord Shiv.

In 1970 Shri Veerabhadreshwar Swamy temple was established by the Veershaiva Lingayata community. The temple was inaugurated (pranpratishtha) by Sri 1008 Jagadguru doctor Chandrashekhar Shivacharya Mahaswamiji, pithadhipati (director) of Sri Jagadguru Vishvaradhya Gyanasimhasana Jangamavadi math, Varanasi, India. This is the only Shri Veerabhadrashwar Swamy temple in the heart of the country, Madhya Pradesh. The Statue of Shri Veerabhadra Swamy is made up of black stone and in the pattern of historical temples in southern India. In this 35-year-old temple. Other temples in temple premises are Shiv Linga and "mata sati devi". The current priest of the temple is Shri. Manik Kanhere.

== See also ==
- Dhulkot
