= Burhanpur district =

Coordinates: 21°18′36″N 76°13′48″E

- District of Madhya Pradesh
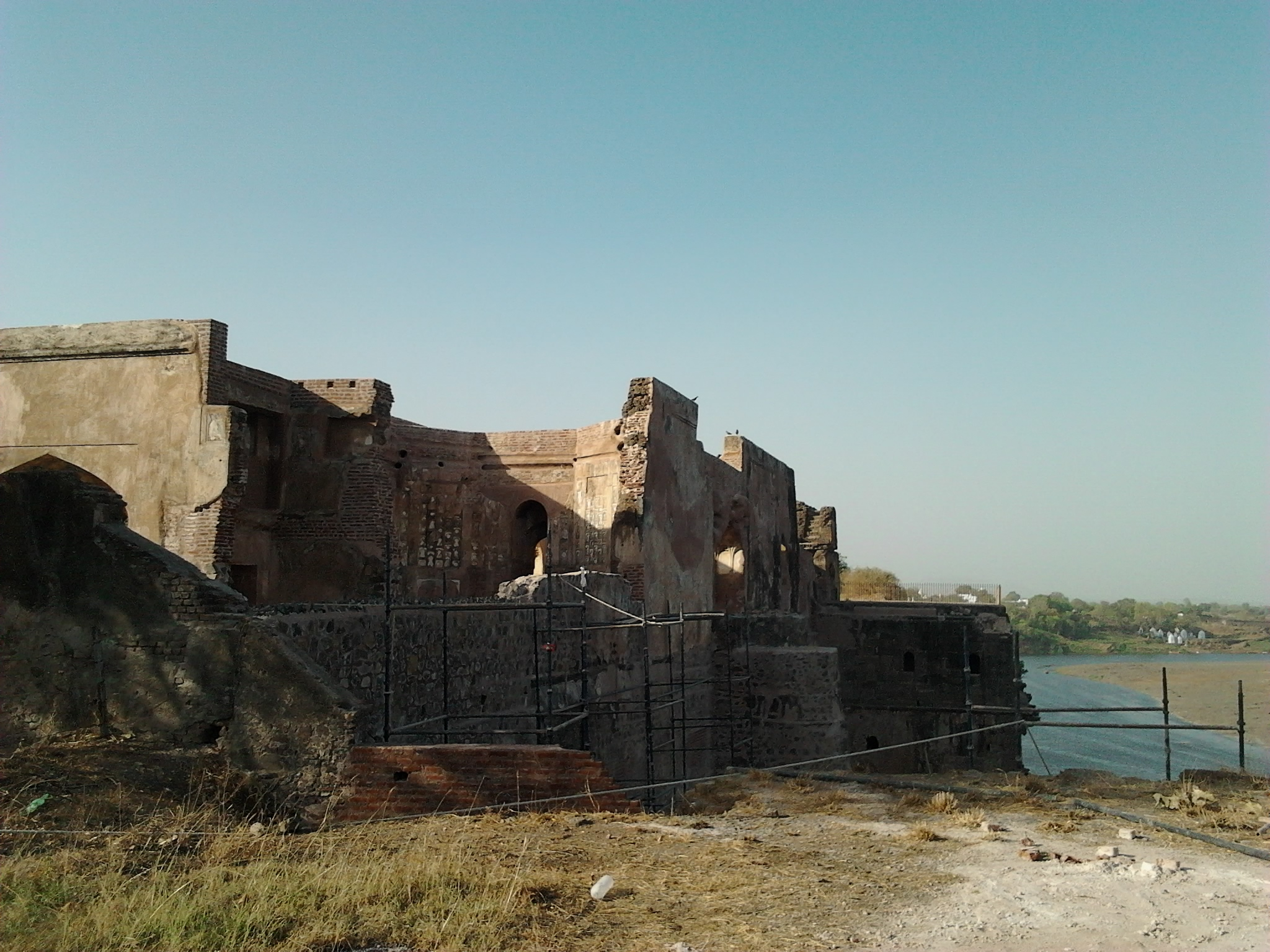
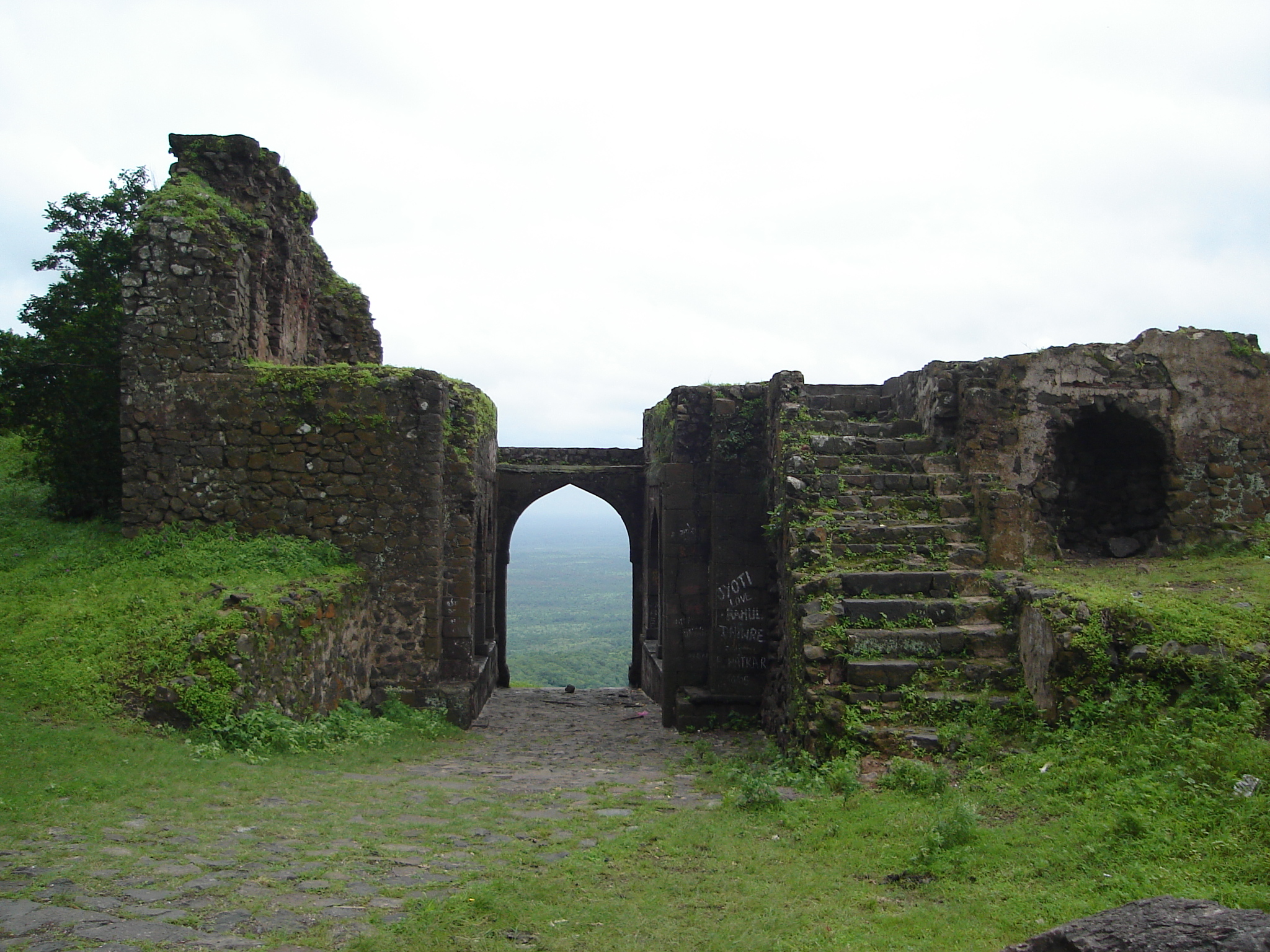
- Top: Shahi Qila in Burhanpur; Bottom: Asirgarh Fort

- Location of Burhanpur district in Madhya Pradesh
- Country: India
- State: Madhya Pradesh
- Division: Indore
- Established: 15 August 2003
- Headquarters: Burhanpur

Government
  - District collector: Bhavya Mittal (IAS)
  - Lok Sabha constituencies: Khandwa
  - Vidhan Sabha constituencies: Nepanagar (179); Burhanpur (180)

Area
  - Total: 3,427 km^{2} (1,323 sq mi)

Population (2011)
  - Total: 757,847
  - Density: 221.1/km^{2} (572.8/sq mi)

Demographics
  - Literacy: 65.28 per cent
  - Sex ratio: 900
- Time zone: UTC+05:30 (IST)
- Website: burhanpur.nic.in

Burhanpur district (Hindi pronunciation: [bʊɾɦaːnpʊɾ]) is a district of Madhya Pradesh state in central India. The city of Burhanpur is the district headquarters.

Burhanpur District was created on 15 August 2003, from the southern portion of Khandwa District. The Tapti River flows through the district from east to west. The district is divided from Khandwa District on the north by the Satpura Range, which is also the divide between the Narmada River valley and the valley of the Tapti. The pass through the Satpuras that connects Burhanpur and Khandwa is one of the main routes connecting northern and southern India, and the Asirgarh fortress, which commands the pass, is known as the "Key to the Deccan".

The district is divided into two development blocks, Burhanpur and Khaknar, and three tehsils, Nepanagar, Burhanpur, and Khaknar. Burhanpur District is part of Indore Division.

Burhanpur is a prominent place for the people of the Dawoodi Bohra community, as it houses one of the holiest and largest dargahs (Dargh-E-Hakimi) of the community.

The old Burhanpur city is surrounded by gates giving it the appearance of a fort.

== History ==
The district was historically part of the Nimar and Khandesh regions, Khandesh subha (province), and was part of the various dynasties that rose and fell here. During the rise of Buddhism, the region was part of Avanti. The Mauryas ruled the region for a while, and were succeeded by the Satavahanas, Vakatakas. The region was part of the Gupta empire but after its collapse passed to Harshavardhana in 608 CE. Asirgarh and its surroundings were then ruled by the Tak Rajputs. In 1296, Alauddin Khilji conquered Asirgarh.

In the Mughal rule of India, this district was part of Khandesh province and Burhanpur was its capital city. In 1536, Humayun visited Burhanpur and forced the submission of Raja Ali Khan, also known as Adlil Shah, who controlled Burhanpur and Asirgarh. His son Bahadur Khan rebelled against Akbar, who soon arrived personally in the region to examine Asirgarh fort for himself. Shah Jahan stayed in the fort starting in 1630 for 2 years to conduct operations against the various Deccan powers, and there his beloved wife Mumtaz Mahal died and was initially buried in Burhanpur. In 1632, Shah Jahan left and left Mahabat Khan as viceroy of the Deccan.

Burhanpur was under the control of Aurangzeb in the late 17th century. In 1681, the Marathas made their first raid on Khandesh and sacked Burhanpur. In 1720, the Nizam of Hyderabad took over control of all Mughal possessions in the Deccan, including Burhanpur, but was constantly beset by the forces of Maratha Peshwa Balaji Rao I until it was ceded to the Marathas. The district was variously controlled by the Scindias or Holkars until in 1818, it came under British rule after the Third Anglo-Maratha War.

In 1857, Tatya Tope passed through the district during the rebellion. Various nationalist figures and freedom fighters arose in the Nimar region. After Independence the district became part of the newly-formed state of Madhya Pradesh.

== Geography ==
Burhanpur district is bordered by Maharashtra state on the South, South-East, Khandwa district in North, Khargone district to the west. Tapti River flows through this district. Nepanagar, Shahpur, Icchapur, Khaknar and Dhulkot is other major towns of District.

== Demographics ==
Historical population
Year	Pop.	±% p.a.
1901	106,985	—
1911	127,696	+1.79%
1921	129,511	+0.14%
1931	152,609	+1.65%
1941	167,736	+0.95%
1951	176,580	+0.52%
1961	238,244	+3.04%
1971	311,188	+2.71%
1981	423,799	+3.14%
1991	533,066	+2.32%
2001	634,883	+1.76%
2011	757,847	+1.79%

According to the 2011 census Burhanpur District has a population of 757,847, roughly equal to the nation of Djibouti or the US state of Alaska. This gives it a ranking of 490th in India (out of a total of 640). The district has a population density of 221 inhabitants per square kilometre (570/sq mi) . Its population growth rate over the decade 2001-2011 was 19.23%. Burhanpur has a sex ratio of 900 females for every 1000 males, and a literacy rate of 65.28%. 34.35% of the population lives in urban areas. Scheduled Castes and Scheduled Tribes made up 8.48% and 30.36% of the population respectively.

Religions in Burhanpur district (2011)
Religion	Percent
Hinduism	72.91%
Islam	23.86%
Buddhism	2.62%
Other or not stated	0.61%

Languages of Burhanpur district (2011)
1. Marathi (27.0%)
2. Hindi (17.2%)
3. Urdu (16.5%)
4. Korku (10.4%)
5. Bareli (6.23%)
6. Bhilali (5.33%)
7. Banjari (3.78%)
8. Bhili (2.81%)
9. Gujarati (2.54%)
10. Nimadi (2.24%)
11. Others (5.98%)

At the time of the 2011 Census of India, 26.97% of the population in the district spoke Marathi, 17.18% Hindi, 16.52% Urdu, 10.42% Korku, 6.23% Bareli, 5.33% Bhilali, 3.78% Banjari, 2.81% Bhili, 2.54% Gujarati, and 2.24% Nimadi as their first language.

== Sub Division and Tehsil ==
There is three tehsil's in Burhanpur District.

- Burhanpur
- Nepanagar
- Khaknar

== Tourist places ==
- Shahi KIla
- Asiragarh Fort
- Raja Jai Singh's Chatri
- Black Tajmahal
- Ahukhana
- Hammam or The Royal Bath
- Jama Masjid
- Dargah-e-Hakimi
- Icchadevi Temple

== Villages ==
- Chillara
