= Yawal Wildlife Sanctuary =

Wildlife sanctuary in Maharashtra, India

- IUCN category IV (habitat/species management area)
- Location within Maharashtra Location within Madhya Pradesh Location within India
- Interactive map of Yawal Wildlife Sanctuary
- Location: Yawal, Jalgaon district, Maharashtra; Khargone district, Madhya Pradesh, India
- Nearest city: Khargone And Burhanpur
- Coordinates: 21.382°N 75.876°E
- Area: 176 km^{2} (68 sq mi)
- Established: 1969

The Yawal Wildlife Sanctuary is a protected area located in the Jalgaon district of Maharashtra, India, at the banks of the Anner and Manjar rivers and at the border of Madhya Pradesh. The sanctuary covers an area of approximately 176 km^{2} (68 sq mi) and is characterized by its extensive dense forest coverage.

The area was officially recognized as protected in 1969. Encroachment, deforestation and tree smuggling led to significant habitat degradation starting in the early 2000s. The local government, indigenous groups, and several environmental organizations have worked to reverse the damage. Organizations such as Lok Sangharsh Morcha (LSM), or the People’s Struggle Front, have worked to ensure conservation of the region. The sanctuary is gradually recovering.

== Climate ==
Heavy rainfall is present, particularly from June to September. Winters see a temperature range of 20-28°C, while during summers the temperature occasionally passes 35°C.

== Wildlife ==
The Yawal Wildlife Sanctuary is home to a significant natural diversity of flora and fauna.

=== Flora ===
Teak, Salai, orchids, and Anjan trees dominate the forest. Other common plant species include Shisam, Haldu, Jamun, Tendu, Awala/Amla, Bamboo and other long grasses.

=== Fauna ===
The sanctuary is home to many wild animals including chinkara, nilgai, sloth bears, leopards, tigers, Indian jackal, Bengal fox, Indian wolf, wild boars, sambar deer, barking deer, jungle cats, Small Indian civet, Indian wild dog.

== Other Attractions ==
The other attractions of the temples of Sri Padmalaya, the Swinging Towers of Farkande, and Unapdev Hot Springs.

== Accommodation ==
The government rest house provides facilities for lodging and boarding. The British period rest house is located in Pal, which is located in the Sanctuary.

== Transportation ==
Jalgaon Airport is the nearest airport to the sanctuary, and the nearest railway station is Bhuswal Junction.
