= Murwara Assembly constituency =

Constituency of the Madhya Pradesh legislative assembly in India

Coordinates: 23.82°N 80.39°E

Murwara
- Constituency No. 93 for the Madhya Pradesh Legislative Assembly

Constituency details
- Country: India
- Region: Central India
- State: Madhya Pradesh
- District: Murwara
- Lok Sabha constituency: Khajuraho
- Established: 1951
- Total electors: 235,857
- Reservation: None

Member of Legislative Assembly
- 16th Madhya Pradesh Legislative Assembly
- Incumbent Sandeep Jaiswal
- Party: Bharatiya Janata Party
- Elected year: 2023
- Preceded by: Giriraj Kishor Poddar

Murwara Assembly constituency is one of the 230 Vidhan Sabha (Legislative Assembly) constituencies of Madhya Pradesh state in central India.

== Overview ==
Murwara (constituency number 93) is one of the 4 Vidhan Sabha constituencies located in Katni district. This constituency covers the entire Katni tehsil of the district.

Murwara is part of Khajuraho Lok Sabha constituency along with 2 other Vidhan Sabha segments, namely, Vijayraghavgarh, Bahoriband and Barwara is also in Katni district but part of Shahdol (Lok Sabha constituency).

== Members of the Legislative Assembly ==
Year	MLA	Party
1952	Govindprasad Sharma	Indian National Congress
1957	Ramdas	Independent
1962	Ramdas	Socialist Party
1967	G. Gupta D	Indian National Congress
1970 by-election	Lakhan Singh Solanki	Indian National Congress
1972	Lakhan Singh Solanki	Indian National Congress
1977	Vibhash Chandra	Janata Party
1980	Chandra Darshan Gour	Indian National Congress (Indira)
1985	Sunil Mishra	Indian National Congress
1990	Ram Rani Johar	Indian National Congress
1993	Sukerti Jain	Bharatiya Janata Party
1998	Dr. Awadesh Pratap Singh	Indian National Congress
2003	Alka Jain	Bharatiya Janata Party
2008	Giriraj Kishor Poddar	Bharatiya Janata Party
2013	Sandeep Jaiswal	Bharatiya Janata Party
2018	Sandeep Jaiswal	Bharatiya Janata Party
2023	Sandeep Jaiswal	Bharatiya Janata Party

== Election results ==
=== 2023 ===
2023 Madhya Pradesh Legislative Assembly election: Murwara
Party	Candidate	Votes	%	±%
BJP	Sandeep Jaiswal	89,652	50.85	+2.1
INC	Mithlesh Jain	64,749	36.73	−2.17
Independent	Jyoti Vinay Dixit	8,297	4.71	
AAP	Sunil Mishra	2,240	1.27	−0.5
Independent	Santosh Shukla	2,226	1.26	
BSP	Manoj Bajhal Advocate	2,178	1.24	−1.37
NOTA	None of the above	969	0.55	−0.74
Majority		24,903	14.12	+4.27
Turnout		176,302	70.55	+1.37
BJP hold		Swing		

=== 2018 ===
2018 Madhya Pradesh Legislative Assembly election: Murwara
Party	Candidate	Votes	%	±%
BJP	Sandeep Jaiswal	79,553	48.75	
INC	Mithlesh Jain	63,473	38.9	
BSP	Promod Gupta	4,252	2.61	
AAP	Sunil Mishra	2,895	1.77	
Sapaks Party	Shashi Kant Shekhar Bhardwaj	1,797	1.1	
Independent	Sandeep Jaiswal	1,704	1.04	
Independent	Sandeep Nayak Advocate	1,568	0.96	
NOTA	None of the above	2,099	1.29	
Majority		16,080	9.85	
Turnout		163,177	69.18	
BJP hold		Swing		

== See also ==
- Murwara
