= Dhruv Pratap Singh =

Indian politician

Dhruv Pratap Singh is an Indian politician who served as the member of the Madhya Pradesh Legislative Assembly from Vijayraghavgarh from 2003 to 2008. He is former chairman of the Katni Development Authority, Madhya Pradesh. He is a member of the Bharatiya Janata Party (BJP).

== Political career ==
Dhruv Pratap Singh entered politics by joining the Bhartiya Janata Party (BJP) in 1980. From 1988 to 2002, he served as the Mandal Adyaksh of Badwara for 14 years.

Singh gained prominence in 1998 when the BJP nominated him as their candidate for the state elections from the Badwara constituency. Although he lost to the Congress candidate by a narrow margin of 2,000 votes, his political career continued to advance.

In the 2003 state elections, the BJP nominated Singh again, but this time from the Vijayraghavgarh constituency, believing he would offer a stronger challenge to the Congress candidate, Satyendra Pathak. Singh won decisively with a margin of 13,000 votes and became a Member of the Madhya Pradesh Legislative Assembly from Vijayraghavgarh.

In the 2008 state elections, the BJP once again nominated Singh from Vijayraghavgarh. However, he lost to the Congress candidate. Following this defeat, the party appointed him as the District Party President of Katni in 2010, reaffirming their confidence in his popularity and influence in both Katni and Vijayraghavgarh constituencies.
