= 2008 Madhya Pradesh Legislative Assembly election =

Indian state election

Madhya Pradesh Legislative Assembly Election 2008
- 27 November 2008

All 230 assembly constituencies 116 seats needed for a majority
- Registered: 36,266,969
- Turnout: 69.63% (▲2.38%)
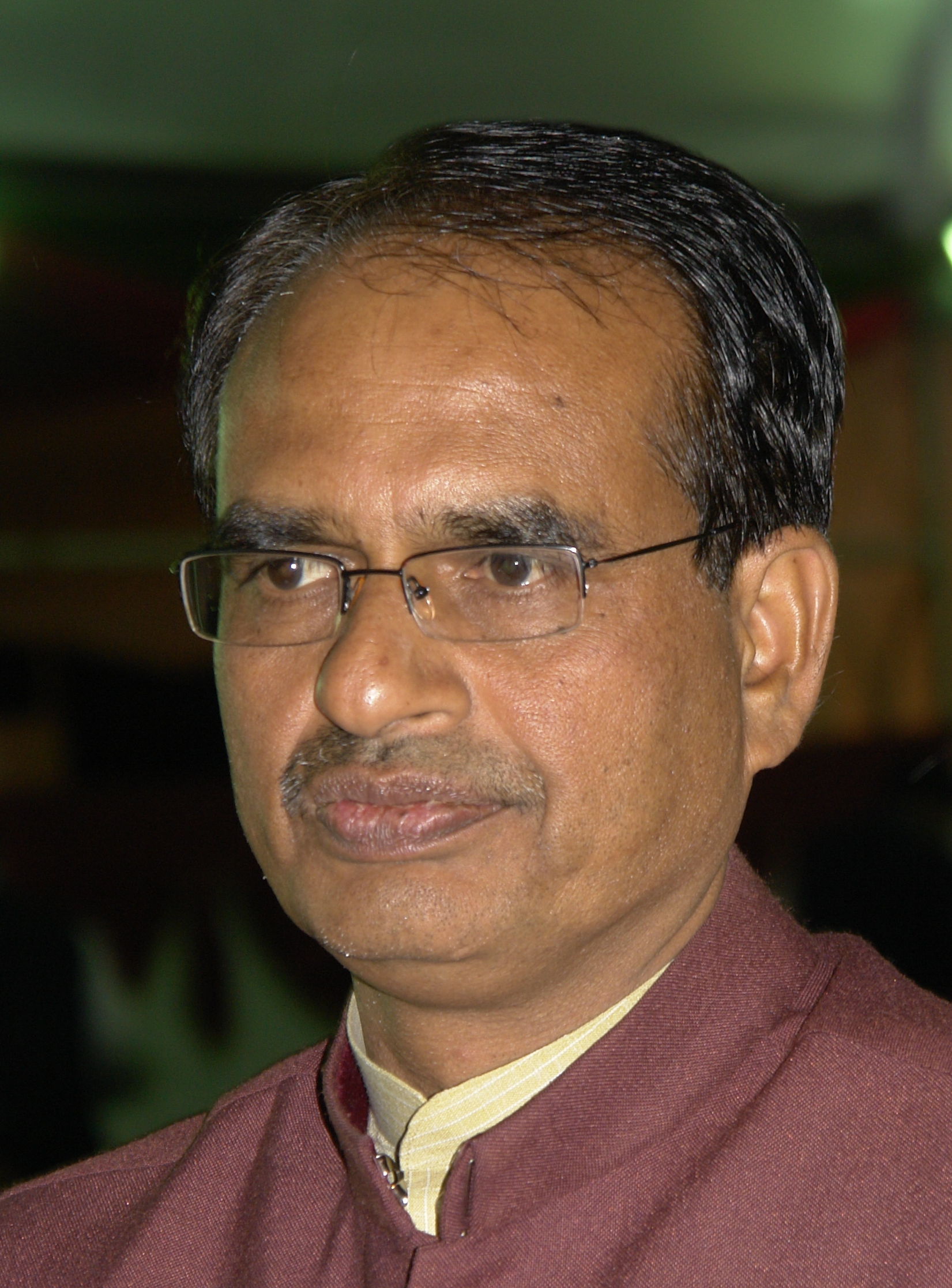

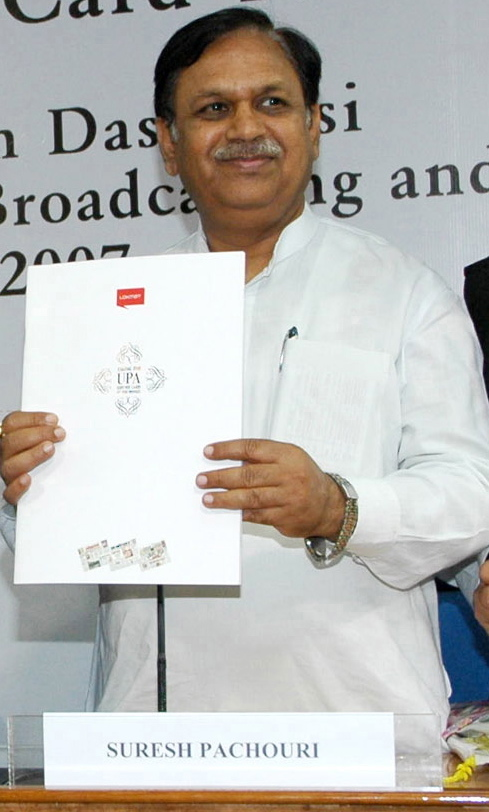

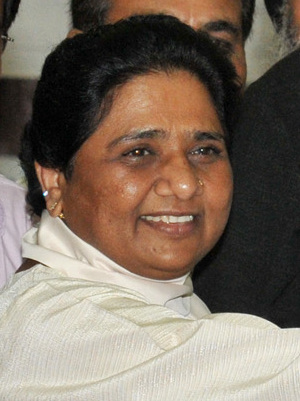
	Majority party	Minority party	Third party
Leader	Shivraj Singh Chouhan	Suresh Pachouri	Mayawati
Party	BJP	INC	BSP
Leader's seat	Budhni	Did not contest	Did not contest
Last election	173	38	2
Seats won	143	71	7
Seat change	▼30	▲33	▲5
Popular vote	9,493,641	8,170,318	2,262,119
Percentage	37.64%	32.39%	9.00%
Swing	▼4.86%	▲0.78%	▲1.71%
- Seatwise Election Result Map

- Structure of the Madhya Pradesh Legislative Assembly after the election
Chief Minister before election
Shivraj Singh Chouhan
BJP
Elected Chief Minister
Shivraj Singh Chouhan
BJP

The 2008 Madhya Pradesh Legislative Assembly election was declared by the Election Commission of India on 14 October 2008. Elections for 230 seats took place on 27 November 2008, and counting started on 8 December. The Bharatiya Janata Party won a majority of seats and Shivraj Singh Chouhan was sworn in as the Chief Minister for the second time.

== Parties ==
The election was mainly contested between two national parties, Bharatiya Janata Party and Indian National Congress. Other parties included Bahujan Samaj Party, Bharatiya Jan Shakti Party, and Samajwadi Party

== Result ==
Source: ECI

#	Party	Seats Contested	Seats won	Seats Changed	Votes	% Votes
1	Bharatiya Janata Party	228	143	30	9493641	37.64
2	Indian National Congress	228	71	+ 33	8170318	32.39
3	Bahujan Samaj Party	228	7	+ 5	2262119	8.97
4	Bharatiya Jan Shakti Party	201	5	+ 5	1189151	4.71
5	Independents		3	+ 1	2076453	8.23
6	Samajwadi Party	187	1	6	501324	1.90
	Total		230			
Valid votes		2,52,23,101	99.91			
Invalid votes		24875	0.09			
Votes cast / turnout		2,52,50,951	69.63			
Abstentions		1,10,16,018	30.37			
Registered voters		3,62,66,969				

Vote Share
1. BJP (37.6%)
2. INC (32.3%)
3. BSP (9.00%)
4. BJSP (4.70%)
5. Independent (8.20%)
6. Other (8.20%)
Seat Share
1. BJP (62.2%)
2. INC (30.9%)
3. BSP (3.04%)
4. BJSP (2.17%)
5. SP (0.43%)
6. Independent (1.30%)

=== Region-wise break up ===
Region	Seats						
Region	Seats	BJP	INC	BSP	BJSP	IND	SP
Bagelkhand	22	17	1	3	1	—N/a	—N/a
Bhopal	25	18	6	—N/a	1	—N/a	—N/a
Bundelkhand	26	14	8	—N/a	2	1	1
Gird	34	16	13	4	1	—N/a	—N/a
Mahakoshal	46	29	17	—N/a	—N/a	—N/a	—N/a
Malwa	50	27	22	—N/a	—N/a	—N/a	—N/a
Narmadapuram	11	8	2	—N/a	—N/a	1	—N/a
Nimar	16	14	2	—N/a	—N/a	1	—N/a
Total	230	143	71	7	5	3	1

== Elected members ==
Constituency	Reserved for (SC/ST/None)	Member	Party
Sheopur District
Sheopur	None	Brijraj Singh	Indian National Congress
Vijaypur	None	Ramniwas Rawat	Indian National Congress
Morena District
Sabalgarh	None	Suresh Chowdhary	Indian National Congress
Joura	None	Maniram Dhakad	Bahujan Samaj Party
Sumawali	None	Adal Singh Kansana	Indian National Congress
Morena	None	Paras Ram Mudgal	Bahujan Samaj Party
Dimani	None	Shiv Mangal Singh Tomar	Bharatiya Janata Party
Ambah	SC	Kamalesh Jatav	Bharatiya Janata Party
Bhind District
Ater	None	Arvind Singh Bhadouria	Bharatiya Janata Party
Bhind	None	Chaudhary Rakesh Singh Chaturvedi	Indian National Congress
Lahar	None	Govind Singh	Indian National Congress
Mehgaon	None	Rakesh Shukla	Bharatiya Janata Party
Gohad	SC	Makhan Lal Jatav	Indian National Congress
Gwalior District
Gwalior Rural	None	Madan Kushwah	Bahujan Samaj Party
Gwalior	None	Pradyumn Singh Tomar	Indian National Congress
Gwalior East	None	Anup Mishra	Bharatiya Janata Party
Gwalior South	None	Narayan Singh Kushwah	Bharatiya Janata Party
Bhitarwar	None	Lakhan Singh Yadav	Indian National Congress
Dabra	SC	Imarti Devi	Indian National Congress
Datia District
Sewda	None	Radhelal Baghel	Bahujan Samaj Party
Bhander	SC	Asha Ram Ahirwar	Bharatiya Janata Party
Datia	None	Narottam Mishra	Bharatiya Janata Party
Shivpuri District
Karera	SC	Khatik Ramesh Prasad	Bharatiya Janata Party
Pohari	None	Prahlad Bharti	Bharatiya Janata Party
Shivpuri	None	Makhan Lal Rathore	Bharatiya Janata Party
Pichhore	None	K. P. Singh Kakkajoo	Indian National Congress
Kolaras	None	Devendra Kumar Jain M	Bharatiya Janata Party
Guna District
Bamori	None	Kanhaiyalal Rameswar Agrawal M	Bharatiya Janata Party
Guna	SC	Rajendra Singh Saluja	Bharatiya Janshakti Party
Chachoura	None	Shivnarayan Meena	Indian National Congress
Raghogarh	None	Mool Singh	Indian National Congress
Ashoknagar District
Ashok Nagar	SC	Ladduram Kori	Bharatiya Janata Party
Chanderi	None	Rao Rajkumar Singh Mahuan	Bharatiya Janata Party
Mungaoli	None	Rao Deshraj Singh Yadav	Bharatiya Janata Party
Sagar District
Bina	SC	Vinod Panthi	Bharatiya Janata Party
Khurai	None	Arunodaya Choubey	Indian National Congress
Surkhi	None	Govindsingh Rajput	Indian National Congress
Deori	None	Dr. Bhanu Rana	Bharatiya Janata Party
Rehli	None	Gopal Bhargav	Bharatiya Janata Party
Naryoli	SC	Eng Pradeep Laria	Bharatiya Janata Party
Sagar	None	Shailendra Kumar Jain	Bharatiya Janata Party
Banda	None	Naryan Prajapati	Indian National Congress
Tikamgarh District
Tikamgarh	None	Yadvendra Singh	Indian National Congress
Jatara	SC	Khatik Harishankar	Bharatiya Janata Party
Prithvipur	None	Brajendra Singh	Indian National Congress
Niwari	None	Meera Deepak Yadav	Samajwadi Party
Khargapur	None	Ajay Yadav	Bharatiya Janshakti Party
Chhatarpur District
Maharajpur	None	Bhanwar Raja Manavendra Singh M	Independent
Chandla	SC	Ahirwar Ramdayal	Bharatiya Janata Party
Rajnagar	None	Kunwar Vikram Singh	Indian National Congress
Chhatarpur	None	Lalita Yadav	Bharatiya Janata Party
Bijawar	None	Asha Rani	Bharatiya Janata Party
Malhara	None	Rekha	Bharatiya Janshakti Party
Damoh District
Pathariya	None	Dr. Ramkrishna Kusmariya Babaji M	Bharatiya Janata Party
Damoh	None	Jayant Malaiya	Bharatiya Janata Party
Jabera	None	Ratnesh Saloman	Indian National Congress
Panna District
Pawai	None	Brijendra Pratap Singh	Bharatiya Janata Party
Gunnaor	SC	Rajesh Kumar Verma	Bharatiya Janata Party
Panna	None	Shrikant Dubey	Indian National Congress
Satna District
Chitrakoot	None	Surendra Singh Gaharwar	Bharatiya Janata Party
Raigaon	SC	Jugul Kishor	Bharatiya Janata Party
Satna	None	Shankar Lal Tiwari	Bharatiya Janata Party
Nagod	None	Nagendra Singh	Bharatiya Janata Party
Maihar	None	Moti Lal Tiwari	Bharatiya Janata Party
Amarpatan	None	Ramkhelawan Patel	Bharatiya Janata Party
Rampur-Baghelan	None	Ram Lakhan Singh	Bahujan Samaj Party
Rewa District
Sirmour	None	Rajkumar Urmaliya	Bahujan Samaj Party
Semariya	None	Abhay Kumar Mishra	Bharatiya Janata Party
Teonthar	None	Ram Garib Kol	Bahujan Samaj Party
Mauganj	None	Laxman Tiwari	Bharatiya Janshakti Party
Deotalab	None	Girish Gautam	Bharatiya Janata Party
Mangawan	SC	Panna Bai Prajapati	Bharatiya Janata Party
Rewa	None	Rajendra Shukla	Bharatiya Janata Party
Gurh	None	Nagendra Singh	Bharatiya Janata Party
Sidhi District
Churhat	None	Ajay Arjun Singh	Indian National Congress
Sidhi	None	Kedar Nath Shukla	Bharatiya Janata Party
Sihawal	None	Viswamitra Pathak	Bharatiya Janata Party
Dhauhani	ST	Kunwar Singh Tekam	Bharatiya Janata Party
Singrauli District
Chitrangi	ST	Jagannath Singh	Bharatiya Janata Party
Singrauli	None	Ram Lallu Bais	Bharatiya Janata Party
Devsar	SC	Ramcharitra S/o Rampyare	Bharatiya Janata Party
Shahdol District
Beohari	ST	Bali Singh Maravi	Bharatiya Janata Party
Jaisingnagar	ST	Sundar Singh	Bharatiya Janata Party
Jaitpur	ST	Jai Singh Maravi	Bharatiya Janata Party
Kotma	None	Dilip Jaisawal	Bharatiya Janata Party
Anuppur District
Anuppur	ST	Bisahulal Singh	Indian National Congress
Pushprajgarh	ST	Sudama Singh	Bharatiya Janata Party
Umaria District
Bandhavgarh	ST	Gyan Singh	Bharatiya Janata Party
Manpur	ST	Meena Singh	Bharatiya Janata Party
Katni District
Barwara	ST	Moti Kashyap	Bharatiya Janata Party
Vijayraghavgarh	None	Sanjay Pathak	Indian National Congress
Murwara	None	Giriraj Poddar	Bharatiya Janata Party
Bahoriband	None	Dr. Nishith Patel	Indian National Congress
Jabalpur District
Patan	None	Ajay Vishnoi	Bharatiya Janata Party
Bargi	None	Suraj Tiwari	Bharatiya Janata Party
Jabalpur East	SC	Lakhan Ghanghoria	Indian National Congress
Jabalpur North	None	Sharad Jain Advocate	Bharatiya Janata Party
Jabalpur Cantonment	None	Ishwardas Rohani	Bharatiya Janata Party
Jabalpur West	None	Harendra Jeet Singh	Bharatiya Janata Party
Panagar	None	Narendra Tripathi	Bharatiya Janata Party
Sihora	ST	Nandini Maravi	Bharatiya Janata Party
Dindori District
Shahpura	ST	Ganga Bai Ureti	Indian National Congress
Dindori	ST	Omkar Singh Markam	Indian National Congress
Mandla District
Bichhiya	ST	Narayan Singh Patta	Indian National Congress
Niwas	ST	Rampyare Kulaste	Bharatiya Janata Party
Mandla	ST	Dev Singh Saiyam	Bharatiya Janata Party
Balaghat District
Baihar	ST	Bhagat Singh Netam	Bharatiya Janata Party
Lanji	None	Ramesh Dileep Bhatere	Bharatiya Janata Party
Paraswada	None	Ramkishor Kawre	Bharatiya Janata Party
Balaghat	None	Gourishankar Chaturbhuj Bisen M	Bharatiya Janata Party
Waraseoni	None	Pradeep Amritlal Jaiswal M	Indian National Congress
Katangi	None	Vishweshwar Bhagat	Indian National Congress
Seoni District
Barghat	ST	Kamal Marskole	Bharatiya Janata Party
Seoni	None	Neeta Pateriya	Bharatiya Janata Party
Keolari	None	Harvansh Singh	Indian National Congress
Lakhnadon	ST	Shashi Thakur	Bharatiya Janata Party
Narsinghpur District
Gotegaon	SC	Narmada Prasad Prajapati	Indian National Congress
Narsingpur	None	Sunil Jaiswal	Indian National Congress
Tendukheda	None	Rao-uday.pratap.singh	Indian National Congress
Gadarwara	None	Sadhana Sthapak	Indian National Congress
Chhindwara District
Junnardeo	ST	Tejilal Saryam	Indian National Congress
Amarwara	ST	Premnarayan Thakur	Bharatiya Janata Party
Chourai	None	Choudhary Mersingh	Indian National Congress
Saunsar	None	Nana Mohod	Bharatiya Janata Party
Chhindwara	None	Deepak Saxena	Indian National Congress
Parasia	SC	Tarachand Bawaria	Bharatiya Janata Party
Pandhurna	ST	Ramrao Kavdeti	Bharatiya Janata Party
Betul District
Multai	None	Sukhdeo Panse	Indian National Congress
Amla	SC	Chaitram Manekar	Bharatiya Janata Party
Betul	None	Alkesh Arya	Bharatiya Janata Party
Ghoradongri	ST	Gita Ramgilal Uikey	Bharatiya Janata Party
Bhainsdehi	ST	Dharmu Sing Sirsam	Indian National Congress
Harda District
Timarni	ST	Sanjay Shah Makdai	Independent
Harda	None	Kamal Patel	Bharatiya Janata Party
Hoshangabad District
Seoni-Malwa	None	Sartaj Singh	Bharatiya Janata Party
Hoshangabad	None	Girja Shanker Sharma	Bharatiya Janata Party
Sohagpur	None	Vijaypal Singh	Bharatiya Janata Party
Pipariya	SC	Thakur Das	Bharatiya Janata Party
Raisen District
Udaipura	None	Bhagwan Singh Rajpoot	Indian National Congress
Bhojpur	None	Surendra Patwa	Bharatiya Janata Party
Sanchi	SC	Dr. Prabhuram Choudhry	Indian National Congress
Silwani	None	Devendra Patel	Bharatiya Janshakti Party
Vidisha District
Vidisha	None	Raghavji	Bharatiya Janata Party
Basoda	None	Hari Singh Raghuvanshi M	Bharatiya Janata Party
Kurwai	SC	Hari Singh Sapre	Bharatiya Janata Party
Sironj	None	Laxmikant Sharma	Bharatiya Janata Party
Shamshabad	None	Surya Prakash Meena	Bharatiya Janata Party
Bhopal District
Berasia	SC	Brahmanand Ratnakar	Bharatiya Janata Party
Bhopal Uttar	None	Arif Aqueel	Indian National Congress
Nerela	None	Vishwas Sarang	Bharatiya Janata Party
Bhopal Dakshin-Paschim	None	Umashankar Gupta	Bharatiya Janata Party
Bhopal Madhya	None	Dhruv Narayan Singh	Bharatiya Janata Party
Govindpura	None	Babulal Gaur	Bharatiya Janata Party
Huzur	None	Jeetendra Daga	Bharatiya Janata Party
Sehore District
Budhni	None	Shivraj Singh Chouhan	Bharatiya Janata Party
Ashta	SC	Ranjeet-singh Gunwan	Bharatiya Janata Party
Ichhawar	None	Karan Singh Verma	Bharatiya Janata Party
Sehore	None	Ramesh Saxena	Bharatiya Janata Party
Rajgarh District
Narsinghgarh	None	Mohan Sharma	Bharatiya Janata Party
Biaora	None	Purshottam Dangi	Indian National Congress
Rajgarh	None	Hemraj Kalponi	Indian National Congress
Khilchipur	None	Priyavrat Singh	Indian National Congress
Sarangpur	SC	Gautam Tetwal	Bharatiya Janata Party
Shajapur District
Susner	None	Santosh Joshi	Bharatiya Janata Party
Agar	SC	Laljiram Malviya	Bharatiya Janata Party
Shajapur	None	Karada Hukumsingh	Indian National Congress
Shujalpur	None	Jaswant Singh Hada	Bharatiya Janata Party
Kalapipal	None	Babulal Verma	Bharatiya Janata Party
Dewas District
Sonkatch	SC	Sajjan Singh Verma	Indian National Congress
Dewas	None	Tukoji Rao Pawar	Bharatiya Janata Party
Hatpipliya	None	Deepak Joshi	Bharatiya Janata Party
Khategaon	None	Brijmohan Dhoot	Bharatiya Janata Party
Bagli	ST	Champalal Dewda	Bharatiya Janata Party
Khandwa District
Mandhata	None	Lokendra Singh Tomar	Bharatiya Janata Party
Harsud	ST	Kunwar Vijay Shah	Bharatiya Janata Party
Khandwa	SC	Devendra Verma	Bharatiya Janata Party
Pandhana	ST	Anar Bhai Waskle	Bharatiya Janata Party
Burhanpur District
Nepanagar	ST	Rajendra Shyamlal Dadu	Bharatiya Janata Party
Burhanpur	None	Archana Chitnis	Bharatiya Janata Party
Khargone District
Bhikangaon	ST	Dhool Singh Dawar	Bharatiya Janata Party
Badwaha	None	Hitendra Singh Dhyan Singh Solanki	Bharatiya Janata Party
Maheshwar	SC	Vijayalaxmi Sadho	Indian National Congress
Kasrawad	None	Atma Ram Patel	Bharatiya Janata Party
Khargone	None	Balkrishna Patidar	Bharatiya Janata Party
Bhagwanpura	ST	Jamna Singh Solanki	Bharatiya Janata Party
Barwani District
Sendhawa	ST	Antar Singh	Bharatiya Janata Party
Rajpur	ST	Devisingh Patel	Bharatiya Janata Party
Pansemal	ST	Bala Bachchan	Indian National Congress
Badwani	ST	Premsingh Patel	Bharatiya Janata Party
Alirajpur District
Alirajpur	ST	Nagarsingh Chouhan	Bharatiya Janata Party
Jobat	ST	Suluchana Rawat	Indian National Congress
Jhabua District
Jhabua	ST	Jewier Meda	Indian National Congress
Thandla	ST	Bhuriya Veersingh	Indian National Congress
Petlawad	ST	Walsingh Meda	Indian National Congress
Dhar District
Sardarpur	ST	Pratap Grewal	Indian National Congress
Gandhwani	ST	Umang Singhar	Indian National Congress
Kukshi	ST	Jamuna Devi	Indian National Congress
Manawar	ST	Ranjana Baghel	Bharatiya Janata Party
Dharampuri	ST	Panchilal Meda	Indian National Congress
Dhar	None	Neena Vikram Verma	Bharatiya Janata Party
Badnawar	None	Rajvardhan Singh Dattigaon	Indian National Congress
Indore District
Depalpur	None	Satyanarayan Patel	Indian National Congress
Indore-1	None	Sudarshan Gupta	Bharatiya Janata Party
Indore-2	None	Ramesh Mendola	Bharatiya Janata Party
Indore-3	None	Ashwin Joshi	Indian National Congress
Indore-4	None	Malini Laxman Singh Gaur	Bharatiya Janata Party
Indore-5	None	Mahendra Hardia	Bharatiya Janata Party
Dr. Ambedkar Nagar-Mhow	None	Kailash Vijayvargiya	Bharatiya Janata Party
Rau	None	Jitu Jirati	Bharatiya Janata Party
Sanwer	SC	Tulsi Silawat	Indian National Congress
Ujjain District
Nagada-Khachrod	None	Dilip Singh Gurjar	Indian National Congress
Mahidpur	None	Dr. Kalpana Parulekar	Indian National Congress
Tarana	SC	Rodmal Rathore	Bharatiya Janata Party
Ghatiya	SC	Ramlal Malviya	Indian National Congress
Ujjain North	None	Paras Jain	Bharatiya Janata Party
Ujjain South	None	Shiv Narayan Jagirdar	Bharatiya Janata Party
Badnagar	None	Shantilal Dhabai	Bharatiya Janata Party
Ratlam District
Ratlam Rural	ST	Laxmi Devi Kharadi	Indian National Congress
Ratlam City	None	Paras Dada	Independent
Sailana	ST	Prabhudayal Gehlot	Indian National Congress
Jaora	None	Mahendrasingh Kalukheda	Indian National Congress
Alot	SC	Manohar Untwal	Bharatiya Janata Party
Mandsaur District
Mandsaur	None	Yashpal Singh Sisodiya	Bharatiya Janata Party
Malhargarh	SC	Jagdish Devda	Bharatiya Janata Party
Suwasra	None	Radhe Shyam-nanalal Patidar	Bharatiya Janata Party
Garoth	None	Subhash Kumar Sojatia	Indian National Congress
Neemuch District
Manasa	None	Vijendrasingh Malaheda M	Indian National Congress
Neemuch	None	Khuman Singh Shivaji	Bharatiya Janata Party
Jawad	None	Om Prakash Sakhlecha	Bharatiya Janata Party
