= Banjari, Katni =

Village in Madhya Pradesh, India

Banjari बंजरी
- Location in Madhya Pradesh
- Coordinates: 23.970°N 80.632°E
- Country: India
- State: Madhya Pradesh
- District: Katni district

Population (2011)
  - Total: 2,750

Language
  - Official: Hindi
- Time zone: UTC+5:30 (IST)

Banjari is a village in Katni district of Madhya Pradesh state of India. It is the site where the Katni River merges into the Mahanadi river. Banjari is located just south of Vijayraghavgarh.

== See also ==
- Katni district
- Vijayraghavgarh
- Katni River
