= Madhana =

Village in Madhya Pradesh, India

Coordinates: 23.5886867°N 80.2924984°E

Madhana is a village located in Dhimarkheda Block, Katni, Madhya Pradesh, India. Madhana's old name is madhogarh. It has historical importance as the great warrior allaha and uddal took their father revenge at the age of 12. Madhana came under rule of King kalia who killed Allah/Uddal father when they were just 11/9 year old. Allah killed Kalia at 12 age and he was true warrior of that time. At present Mr Govind Pratap s/o late SHIVRAJ Bahadur is sarpanch of Madhana.

== Demographics ==
Per the 2011 Census of India, Madhana had a total population of 947. Of the population 481 were male and 466 were female.

== Geography ==
The total geographical area of the village is 667 hectares.

== Administration ==
Madhana is a gram panchayat in Dhimarkheda Tehsil. Currently Govind Pratap Singh is the pradhan (sarpanch) of the Madhana village.
