= Umaria Pan =

Town in Madhya Pradesh, India

- Town
- Location in Madhya Pradesh, India
- Coordinates: 23.51°N 80.27°E
- Country: India
- State: Madhya Pradesh
- District: Katni District
- Elevation: 304 m (997 ft)

Population (2011)
  - Total: 8,591

Languages
  - Official: Hindi
- PIN: 483332
- Vehicle registration: MP 21

Umaria Pan is a town located in Katni district of Madhya Pradesh in Central India. it's belongs to Jabalpur Division.

== Geography ==
Umaria is located on 23.51°N 80.27°E. It has an average elevation of 508 metres (1669 feet). It's 40 km away from District Headquarter.

== Demographics ==
As per Census of India 2011 Umariya Pan town has population of 8,591 of which 4,455 are males while 4,136 are females with total 1,840 families residing.

== Transportation ==
Umaria is 40 km away from Katni, 21 km away from Sihora and 60 km away from Jabalpur. Umaria is well connected with roads and daily bus service available here. Pin Code of Umaria is 483332.

== See also ==
- Dhimarkheda
