= Malviya (surname) =

The Malviya or Malaviya surname is associated with the Gaur Brahmin community that originally settled in the Malwa region of Madhya Pradesh, India. Over time, individuals from this community began using the toponymic surname "Malviya," which literally translates to "those from Malwa" in Central India. Following their migration to various other regions, they continued to use this surname, and as a result, they are often referred to as Malviya Brahmins.

== Notable people ==
- Amit Malviya
- Bapulal Malviya
- Govind Malaviya
- Harish Chandra Dube
- Kartikey Malviya
- Keshav Dev Malviya
- Laljiram Malviya
- Madan Mohan Malaviya
- Radhakishan Malviya
- Ratanlal Kishorilal Malviya
- Satya Prakash Malaviya
- Shakti Malviya
- Surendra Malviya

== See also ==
- Neeraj Malviya, an actor previously engaged to Charu Asopa
