= Barhi =

Barhi may refer to places in India:

- Barhi, Hazaribagh, Jharkhand
  - Barhi (community development block), an administrative division in the Barhi subdivision
- Barhi, Katni, Madhya Pradesh
