= Sleemanabad =

Sleemanabad स्लीमनाबाद, سلیماناباد
- Village
- Location in Madhya Pradesh, India Sleemanabad (India)
- Coordinates: 23.10°N 80.12°E
- Country: India
- State: Madhya Pradesh
- District: Katni
- Named for: William Henry Sleeman
- Elevation: 418 m (1,371 ft)

Population
  - Total: 40,000

Languages
  - Official: Hindi
- Time zone: UTC+5:30 (IST)
- PIN: 483440
- Coastline: 0 kilometres (0 mi)
- Nearest city: Katni
- Lok Sabha constituency: Katni
- Vidhan Sabha constituency: Bahoriband
- Avg. summer temperature: 42 °C (108 °F)
- Avg. winter temperature: 12 °C (54 °F)

Sleemanabad is a village in Katni District of Madhya Pradesh, India, approximately 62 km from Jabalpur and 32 km from Katni.

== Etymology ==
Sleemanabad, literally "Sleeman's town", was named after William Henry Sleeman, a British army officer and administrator. During the colonial period Sleeman was one of the key figures responsible for bringing an end to the Thuggee Cult.

== Demographics ==
As per Census of India 2011 The Sleemnabad Town has population of 5957 of which 3050 are males while 2907 are females.

== Copper deposits ==
Copper deposits are found in Sleemanabad. As per Geological Survey of India's DID Report (2011) on base metals, in this area the mineralisation is mostly along faults, fractures/ joints trending N10° - 20°W to S10° - 20°E. Baryte veins and limonitic patches are noticed in the brecciated quartzites. Geochemical sampling showed results for copper.

== Transportation ==
Sleemnabad is 32 km away from Katni by road. Here's a small railway station total 14 train arrives at the Sleemnabad road Railway Station.
