= Bahoriband =

- Town
- Location in Madhya Pradesh, India Bahoriband (India)
- Coordinates: 23.67°N 80.06°E
- Country: India
- State: Madhya Pradesh
- District: Katni
- Founder: Katni District Administration

Government
  - Type: Elected
  - Body: Municipal Committee

Area
  - Total: 940 km^{2} (360 sq mi)

Population (2011)
  - Total: 198,914
  - Density: 210/km^{2} (550/sq mi)

Languages
  - Official: Hindi
- Time zone: UTC+5:30 (IST)
- PIN: 483330
- Vehicle registration: MP 21

Bahoriband is a tehsil and gram panchayat in Katni district in the Indian state of Madhya Pradesh. The headquarters is located in Bahoriband. It belongs to Jabalpur Division. It is located 44 km west of Katni and 320 km west of the state capital Bhopal. Bahoriband Tehsil is bounded by Sihora and Majhouli Tehsils to the south, Rithi Tehsil to the north and Murwara Tehsil to the east. Nearby cities include Jabalpur, Umaria and Katni.

Tourist destinations include Bandhavgarh National Park, Jabalpur (Sanskaardhaani), Bhedaghat, Vijayraghavgarh, Maihar and Panna.

Tourist Places

Tigwan- This is an historical place. There is two stone temple 'Sharda Temple & Kankali Temple'. It is also protected by heritage department.

Roopnath - There is a Shiv & Parvati temple and water fall naming 'Sita kund, Ram Kund, Laxamn Kund'. There is a very large mela organized from 14 Jan to 24 Jan every year.

== Demographics ==
Hindi is the local language here. The total population is 163,496 living in 35,054 houses, spread across a total of 197 villages and 79 panchayats. Males number 83,722 and females number 79,774.

== Transport ==
=== Rail ===
There is no railway station within 10 km of Bahoriband. However, Katni and Sihora stations are 43 km and 23.2 km from Bahoriband, respectively.

=== Road ===
Bahoriband town has two major roads, one from Sihora to Bahoriband and from Bahoriband to Sleemnabad.

== Antiquities ==
Bahoriband is well known for the famous Shantinath image in the Bahoriband Jain temple with a Kalchuri period inscription. Tigawa, a notable archaeological site with a Gupta period temple, now known as the Kankali Devi Temple, is nearby.

== Airport ==
Bahoriband's nearest airport is Jabalpur Airport situated 80 km away.

== Education & Sports ==
Bahoriband has many govt. and private schools, such as:

- Govt. degree College Bahoriband
- Pathshala English medium School
- JPG memorial school
- ITI bahoriband.
- Utkrasht Govt. HS School
- Azad Vivekanand Yuva Sangathan (AVYS), NGO - Sports and village development program.
