= Mohas Hanuman Mandir =

Hanuman temple in Madhya Pradesh

Religion
- Affiliation: Hinduism
- District: Katni
- Deity: Lord Hanuman

Location
- Location: Mohas Village
- State: Madhya Pradesh
- Country: India

Mohas Hanuman Mandir is a Hanuman temple located in Mohas village, which is 35 km away from Katni, Madhya Pradesh, India.

Mohas village's people believe that by eating the herbs found in the temple, broken bones get healed by the blessings of the God.

== History ==
Mohas village's people believe that Adhari Lal Patel was the father of the priest of the temple, Sarman Patel, was suggested by a sage in the forest to do good to the people by providing them some herbs. So, he started giving herbs to people. The place where he gave herbs later developed to a temple.
