= Chhoti Mahanadi =

River in Madhya Pradesh, India

Coordinates: 24°01′33″N 80°52′21″E

Chhoti Mahanadi is a river in northeast part of Madhya Pradesh. It is a tributary of the Sone River and part of Ganges basin system.

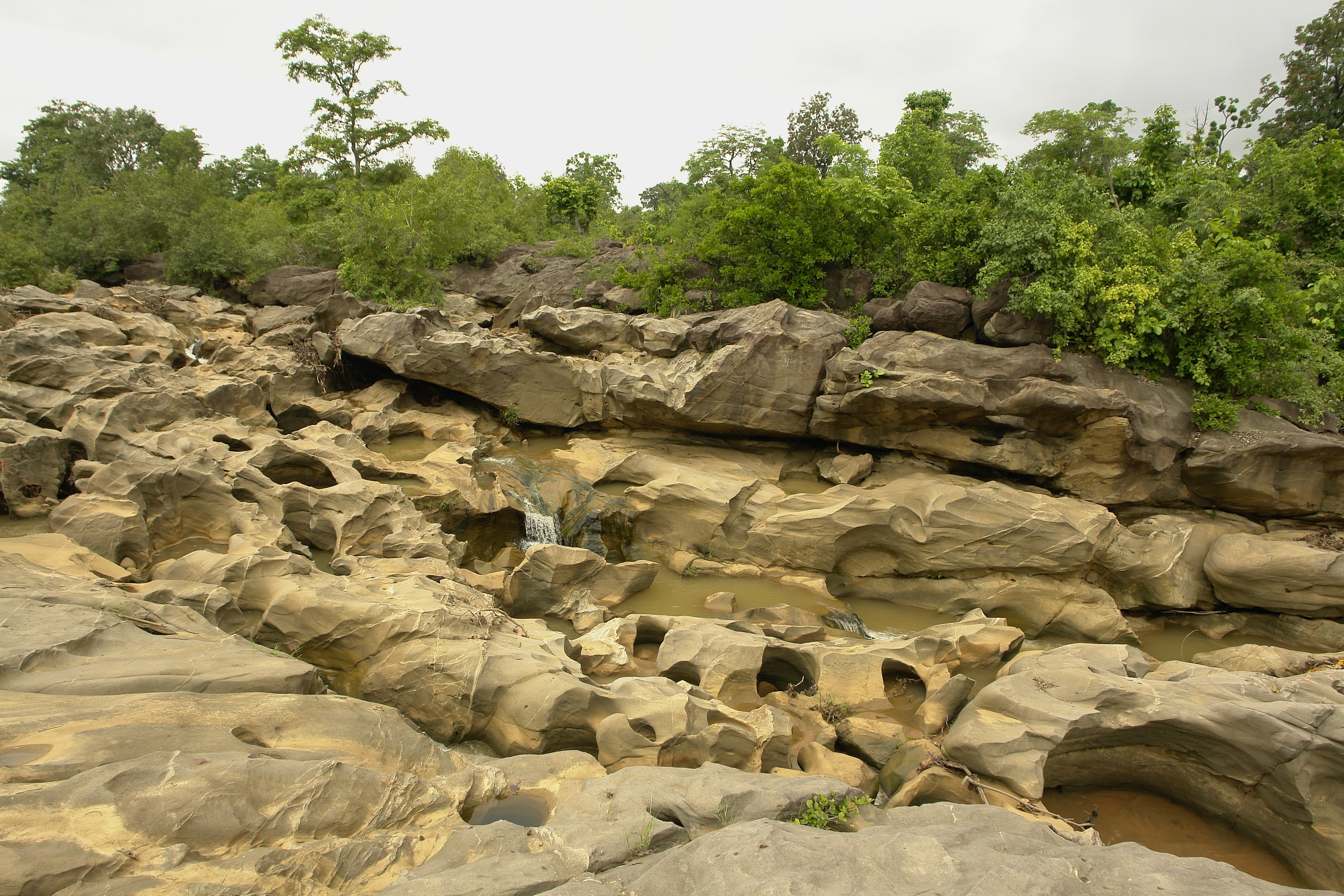
Chhoti Mahanadi in Umaria District

== Origin ==
The Chhoti Mahanadi originates from Tordara in the Satpura hills of Dindori district, at an elevation of 761 meters above sea level.

== Flow ==
It flows generally in a north-westerly direction, forming the boundary between Umaria and Katni districts. The river basin is approximately 100 kilometers from north to south and 66 kilometers from east to west. The river joins the Sone river at the Bansagar Dam. The Katni and Umrara rivers are major tributaries of the Chhoti Mahanadi river.
