= Vijayraghavgarh Assembly constituency =

Constituency of the Madhya Pradesh legislative assembly in India

Coordinates: 24.00°N 80.60°E

Vijayraghavgarh
- Constituency No. 92 for the Madhya Pradesh Legislative Assembly

Constituency details
- Country: India
- Region: Central India
- State: Madhya Pradesh
- District: Murwara
- Lok Sabha constituency: Khajuraho
- Established: 1967
- Reservation: None

Member of Legislative Assembly
- 16th Madhya Pradesh Legislative Assembly
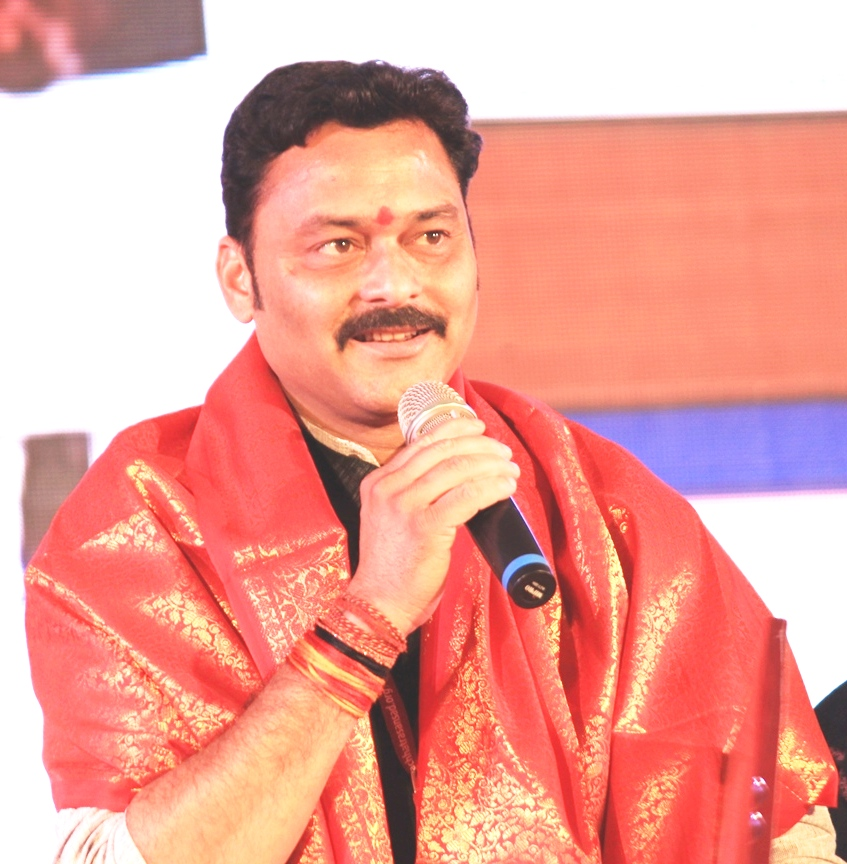
- Incumbent Sanjay Pathak
- Party: Bharatiya Janata Party
- Elected year: 2023
- Preceded by: Dhruv Pratap Singh

Vijayraghavgarh Assembly constituency is one of the 230 Vidhan Sabha (Legislative Assembly) constituencies of Madhya Pradesh state in central India.

It is part of Katni district.

== Members of Legislative Assembly ==
Election	Name	Party
1967	L. Shanker	Indian National Congress
1972	Ramrani Johar	Indian National Congress
1977	Laxmichand Bajhal	Janata Party
1980	R. K. Sharma	Indian National Congress
1985	Lal Rajendra Singh Baghet	Bharatiya Janata Party
1990	Lal Rajendra Singh Baghet	Bharatiya Janata Party
1993	Satyendra Pathak	Indian National Congress
1998	Satyendra Pathak	Indian National Congress
2003	Dhruv Pratap Singh	Bharatiya Janata Party
2008	Sanjay Pathak	Indian National Congress
2013	Sanjay Pathak	Indian National Congress
2014^	Sanjay Pathak	Bharatiya Janata Party
2018	Sanjay Pathak	Bharatiya Janata Party
2023	Sanjay Pathak	Bharatiya Janata Party

^ bypoll

== Election results ==
=== 2023 ===
2023 Madhya Pradesh Legislative Assembly election: Vijayraghavgarh
Party	Candidate	Votes	%	±%
BJP	Sanjay Pathak	98,010	52.99	+5.16
INC	Neeraj Dada	73,664	39.83	+0.22
GGP	Laique Ahmad Qureshi	3,192	1.73	
Independent	Ram Bhuwan Tripathi	1,817	0.98	
NOTA	None of the above	3,398	1.84	−0.54
Majority		24,346	13.16	+4.94
Turnout		184,947	77.92	+0.85
BJP hold		Swing		

=== 2018 ===
2018 Madhya Pradesh Legislative Assembly election: Vijayraghavgarh
Party	Candidate	Votes	%	±%
BJP	Sanjay Pathak	79,939	47.83	
INC	Padma Shukla	66,201	39.61	
BSP	Ram Sarovar Kushwaha	7,482	4.48	
Independent	Rajendra	3,376	2.02	
Independent	Pandit Ramgopal Dubey	1,623	0.97	
NOTA	None of the above	3,974	2.38	
Majority		13,738	8.22	
Turnout		167,130	77.07	
BJP hold		Swing		

== See also ==
Vijayraghavgarh
