= Motilal Verma =

Indian politician

- Born: 1906; Katni District of Madhya Pradesh
- Died: 1993 (aged 86–87); Katni District of Madhya Pradesh

Motilal Verma (1906–1993) was an Indian political activist who participated in the Indian independence movement.

== Personal life ==
Motilal Verma was born in 1906 into a wealthy family in Katni district.

In 1930, Verma protested against British forces during the Jungle Satyagraha led by Mahatma Gandhi. He was imprisoned for six months and his family’s property was confiscated by the British Raj.

In 1942, Verma took part in the Quit India movement, was arrested, and spent eight months in prison.

He worked with independence movement leaders, including Chandra Shekhar Azad.

Verma died in 1993 in Katni district.

== Legacy ==
Motilal Verma wrote various books about Indian revolutionaries such as Rajguru, Batukeshwar Dutt, and Jagrani Devi, the mother of Chandra Shekhar Azad.
