= Barhi, Katni =

Barhi
- Town
- Location in Madhya Pradesh, India Barhi (India)
- Coordinates: 23.9°N 80.8°E
- Country: India
- State: Madhya Pradesh
- District: Katni

Government
  - Type: democracy

Area
  - Total: 508 km^{2} (196 sq mi)
- Elevation: 361 m (1,184 ft)

Population (2011)
  - Total: 103,512
  - Density: 204/km^{2} (528/sq mi)

Languages
  - Official: Hindi
- Time zone: UTC+5:30 (IST)
- Postal code: 483770
- ISO 3166 code: IN-MP
- Vehicle registration: MP

Barhi is a town, Tehsil and a Nagar Parishad in Katni district in the state of Madhya Pradesh, India.

== Geography ==
Barhi is located at 23.9°N 80.8°E. It has an average elevation of 361 metres (1,184 feet).

== Demographics ==
As of 2001 India census, Barhi had a population of 13,946 Males constitute 53% of the population and females 47%. Barhi has an average literacy rate of 58%, lower than the national average of 59.5%; with 62% of the males and 38% of the females literate. 17% of the population is under 6 years of age.

== Transport ==
By Bus

Barhi is served by five main road bus services daily two hours from the district headquarters.

By Rail

Khanna Banjari Railway Station

Vijayraghavgarh is around 25 kilometres (16 mi) away. There is a Barhi to Katni bus service in every 75 minutes.
