= Pranay Prabhat Pandey =

Indian politician

Member of Madhya Pradesh Legislative Assembly
- Incumbent
- Assumed office 2018
- Constituency: Bahoriband

Personal details
- Political party: Bharatiya Janata Party
- Profession: Politician, Businessman

Pranay Prabhat Pandey is an Indian politician and businessman from Madhya Pradesh. He is a two time elected Member of the Madhya Pradesh Legislative Assembly from 2018 and 2023, representing Bahoriband Assembly constituency as a Member of the Bharatiya Janata Party. He comes from a family of politician, his Father and Great GrandFather have served as the members from Sihora Vidhan Sabha.

== See also ==
- List of chief ministers of Madhya Pradesh
- Madhya Pradesh Legislative Assembly
