= Madhavnagar Road railway station =

Railway station in Madhya Pradesh

General information
- Location: Madhavnagar, Katni district, Madhya Pradesh; India
- Coordinates: 23.7872°N 80.3944°E
- Elevation: 396 metres (1,299 ft)
- System: Indian Railways station
- Owner: Indian Railways
- Operator: West Central Railway
- Line: Jabalpur–Bhusaval section
- Platforms: 2
- Tracks: 2
- Connections: Auto stand

Construction
- Structure type: Standard (on-ground station)
- Parking: No
- Cycle facilities: No

Other information
- Status: Construction – double-line electrification
- Station code: MDRR
- Zone(s): West Central Railway
- Division(s): Jabalpur

Services
Preceding station	Indian Railways	Following station
Katni South towards ?	West Central Railway zone Jabalpur–Bhusaval section	Niwar towards ?
Location

Madhavnagar Road railway station is a small railway station in Katni district, Madhya Pradesh. Its code is MDRR. It serves Madhavnagar city. The station consists of two platforms, neither well sheltered. It lacks many facilities including water and sanitation.
