= Bahoriband Assembly constituency =

Constituency of the Madhya Pradesh legislative assembly in India

Coordinates: 23.67°N 80.06°E

Bahoriband
- Constituency No. 94 for the Madhya Pradesh Legislative Assembly

Constituency details
- Country: India
- Region: Central India
- State: Madhya Pradesh
- District: Katni
- Lok Sabha constituency: Khajuraho
- Established: 1972
- Reservation: None

Member of Legislative Assembly
- 16th Madhya Pradesh Legislative Assembly
- Incumbent Pranay Prabhat Pandey
- Party: Bharatiya Janata Party
- Elected year: 2023
- Preceded by: Kunwar Saurabh Singh

Bahoriband is one of the 230 Vidhan Sabha (Legislative Assembly) constituencies of Madhya Pradesh state in central India.

It is part of Katni district. As of 2023, its representative is Pranay Prabhat Pandey of the Bharatiya Janata Party.

== Members of the Legislative Assembly ==
| Election | Name | Party |
|---|---|---|
| 1962 | Balkrishna | Bharatiya Jana Sangh |
| 1967 | R. Shukla | Bharatiya Jana Sangh |
| 1972 | Kunjbihari Lal | Indian National Congress |
| 1977 | Tarachand Chaurasia | Janata Party |
| 1980 | Shravan Kumar Patel | Indian National Congress (Indira) |
| 1985 | Shravan Kumar Patel | Indian National Congress |
| 1990 | Rani Dubey | Bharatiya Janata Party |
| 1993 | Vishnu Dutt Pouranik | Indian National Congress |
| 1998 | Shravan Kumar Patel | Indian National Congress |
| 2003 | Nishith Patel | Indian National Congress |
| 2008 | Nishith Patel | Indian National Congress |
| 2013 | Prabhat Pandey | Bharatiya Janata Party |
| 2014 (Note: by-election) | Kunwar Saurabh Singh | Indian National Congress |
| 2018 | Pranay Prabhat Pandey | Bharatiya Janata Party |
| 2023 | Pranay Prabhat Pandey | Bharatiya Janata Party |

== Election results ==
=== 2023 ===
2023 Madhya Pradesh Legislative Assembly election: Bahoriband
| Party | Candidate | Votes | % | ±% |
|---|---|---|---|---|
| BJP | Pranay Prabhat Pandey | 94,817 | 47.38 | −2.4 |
| INC | Kunwar Saurabh Singh | 71,195 | 35.58 | −5.01 |
| SP | Shankar Mahto | 21,598 | 10.79 | |
| Independent | Sita Choudhari | 1,957 | 0.98 | |
| NOTA | None of the above | 465 | 0.23 | −1.3 |
| Majority | | 23,622 | 11.8 | +2.61 |
| Turnout | | 200,105 | 81.7 | +0.84 |
| BJP hold | | Swing | | |

=== 2018 ===
2018 Madhya Pradesh Legislative Assembly election: Bahoriband
| Party | Candidate | Votes | % | ±% |
|---|---|---|---|---|
| BJP | Pranay Prabhat Pandey | 89,041 | 49.78 | |
| INC | Kunwar Saurabh Singh | 72,606 | 40.59 | |
| BSP | Choudhari Govind Patel | 5,143 | 2.88 | |
| Independent | Satyendra Singh Dabbu Rajput | 2,727 | 1.52 | |
| AAP | Anil Singh Sengar (Advocate) | 1,662 | 0.93 | |
| NOTA | None of the above | 2,735 | 1.53 | |
| Majority | | 16,435 | 9.19 | |
| Turnout | | 178,885 | 80.86 | |
| BJP gain from INC | | Swing | | |

== See also ==
- Katni district
- List of constituencies of the Madhya Pradesh Legislative Assembly
