= Akshat Khamparia =

Indian chess player (born 1989)

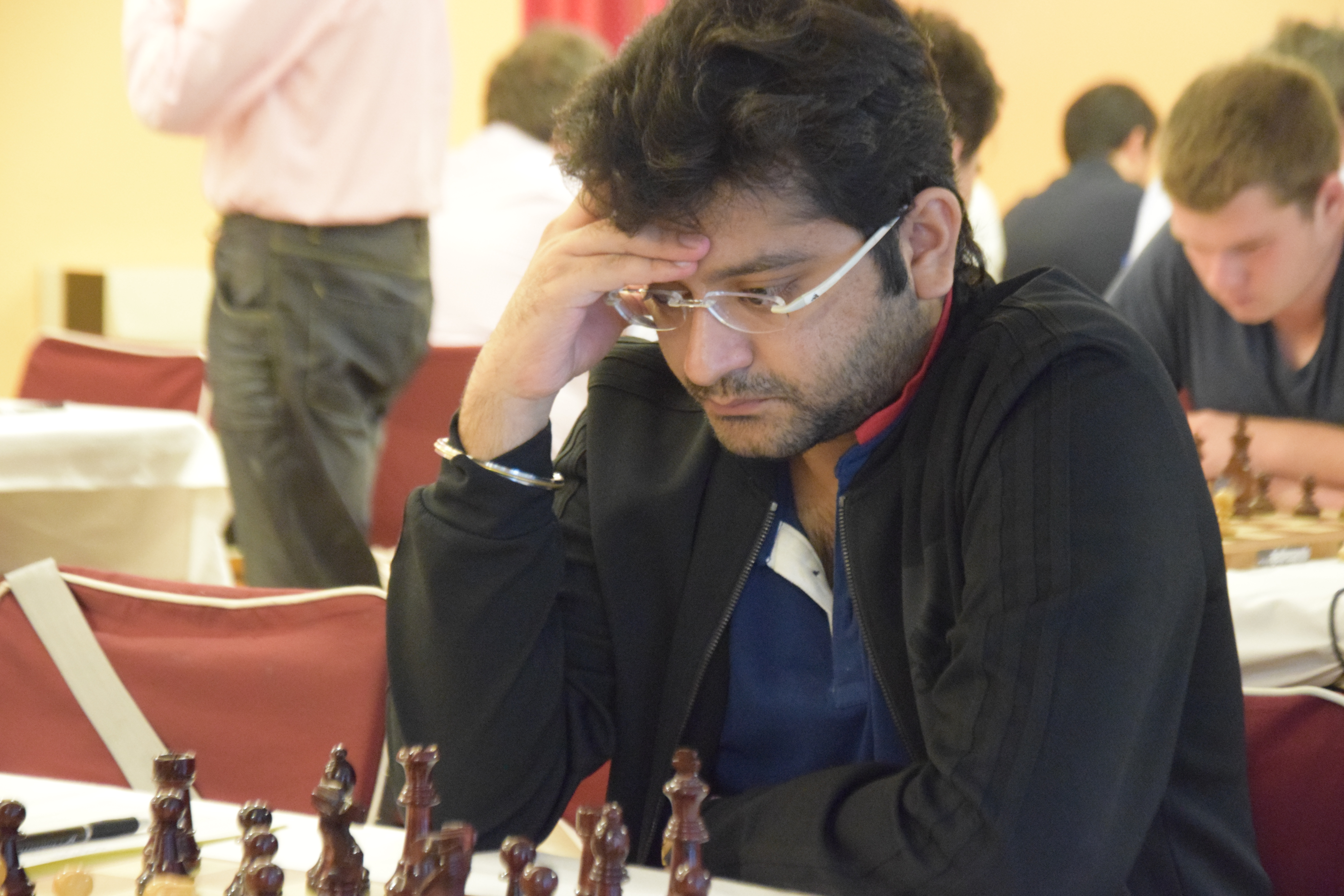

Personal information
- Born: 9 February 1989 (age 37) Katni, Madhya Pradesh, India

Chess career
- Country: India
- Title: International Master (2011)
- Peak rating: 2415 (December 2014)
Medal record
Commonwealth Chess Championship
| Silver medal – second place |

Akshat Khamparia (born 9 February 1989) is an Indian chess International Master. He is the first player from Central India to hold an 'International Master' Title.

He has played more than 100 national championships and more than 40 international championships. He holds the 58th rank in the Top 100 Chess Players list of India (published by the World Chess Federation) and is the only player of Madhya Pradesh to win all the State U-8, U-10, U-12, U-14, U-16, U-19, U-25 and Seniors Chess Championship.

Khamparia has represented India in various international championships at Turkey, Malaysia, Bahrain, UAE, Sri Lanka, Iran, Nepal and many other countries. He was a silver medalist in the Commonwealth Chess Championship, and has a master's title from World Chess Federation. He was an International Master in the 82nd FIDE Congress 2011 at Kraków, Poland, in October 2011. IM Akshat Khamparia (IND) won the extraordinarily close GM group of the usual monthly First Saturday GM tournament in May 2018.

== Achievements ==
- Silver Medalist in Commonwealth Chess Championship
- Recipient of Malwa Khel Ratna Award
- 1st player from Central India to become International Master
- Rating wise best player in whole Madhya Pradesh since 2003
- Ranked 88th in India
- National A Player.
- Played in 120+ national championships and 80+ international championships
