= Sanjay Pathak =

Indian politician

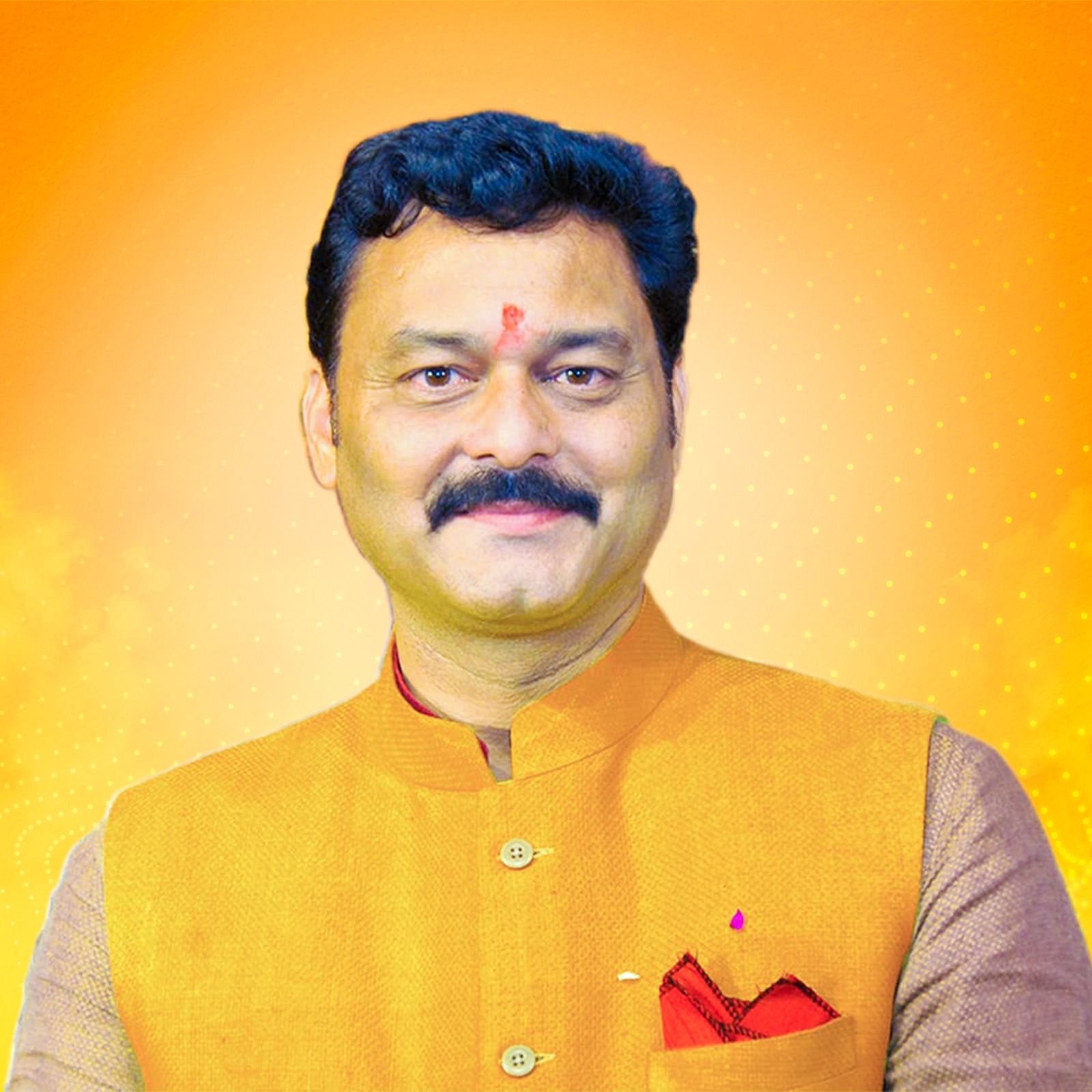

Member of the Legislative Assembly, Government of Madhya Pradesh
- Incumbent
- Assumed office December 2008
- Constituency: Vijayraghavgarh

Minister of State for Micro, Small and Medium Enterprises, Government of Madhya Pradesh
- In office July 2016 – December 2018

Personal details
- Born: 31 October 1970 (age 55) Katni, Madhya Pradesh, India
- Party: Bharatiya Janata Party
- Spouse: Nidhi Pathak
- Children: 2

Sanjay Satyendra Pathak is an Indian politician. He served as a state minister in the Government of Madhya Pradesh from 2016 to 2018 and was elected to the Madhya Pradesh Legislative Assembly for five terms from Vijayraghavgarh.

== Early life ==
Pathak's late father, Satyendra Pathak was also a politician. Following his father's footsteps, he too entered politics and won five times as MLA. He is a businessman and one of the richest MLAs in Madhya Pradesh according to the affidavit he filed to Election Commission.

== Career ==
Pathak contested Madhya Pradesh Legislative Assembly Election 2008 for the first time and won. He retained his seat winning the 2013 Madhya Pradesh Legislative Assembly Election representing Indian National Congress from Vijayraghavgarh Assembly Constituency. He defeated Padma Shukla of BJP by a narrow margin of 929 votes. However, he resigned from his seat in April 2014 due to ideological differences with Indian National Congress and joined BJP. He re-contested and won the August By-Poll with a huge margin of 53,397 votes. He, later, served as the Minister of State for Small, Micro and Medium Enterprises in the Government of Madhya Pradesh from July 2016 till December 2018.

He was re-elected from Vijayragahavgarh again in December 2018 and served the constituency before being re-elected in the Madhya Pradesh Legislative Assembly Election 2023, he again won by a massive margin to become MLA for the fifth time.

== Social Work ==
In 2023, Pathak established a religious/spiritual pilgrim for the poor and needy. It was inaugurated by Shivraj Singh Chouhan, the then Chief Minister of Madhya Pradesh. Shri Harihar Teerth Dham is a one stop pilgrimage destination for all. The Bhoomi Poojan was blessed with the presence of esteemed spiritual Gurus from all across India, including prominent names like Acharya Mahamandaleshwar of the Juna Akhara, Swami Avdheshanand Giri Ji Maharaj, JagatGuru Shri RamBhadracharya Ji Maharaj, Sri Sri Ravi Shankar, Didi Sadhvi Rithambara and many more.

In 2013, he had rescued the pilgrims in the aftermath of the flash floods in Uttarakhand. He flew down from Katni to Uttrakhand to help the stuck pilgrims. His efforts were praised by the entire nation.
