= Giriraj Poddar =

Indian politician

Giriraj Poddar is an Indian politician and industrialist from Murwara in Katni District, Madhya Pradesh state. He was elected as a MLA of the Madhya Pradesh Vidhan Sabha in 2008 from Murwara, running as a member of the Bharatiya Janata Party. His victory margin was one of the highest in the assembly of around 30,000 votes. He is a member of various committees of the Vidhan Sabha. He is originally from Sambhar Lake in Rajasthan, but his family later shifted their base to Mughal Sarai in Uttar Pradesh.

He is the highest distributor of jan sampark rashi. He is credited with the Khiraini Overbridge, Katni Nadi Bridge, a bow-shaped bridge in Madhya Pradesh. He spent a consecutive 15 days outside his home in his constituency in Yatra and interviewed approximately 50,000 people to gather data for the further development of Katni. The social organisation he is affiliated with is Desh Disha Manch, known for its efforts for Khirani Overbridge. He became one of the few MLA of states who used 100% of the fund allocated to their corpus.
