= Ramdas (politician) =

Indian politician

Ramdas Agrawal AKA Lallu Bhaiya

Member of the Madhya Pradesh Legislative Assembly
- In office 1957–1967
- Preceded by: Govindprasad Sharma
- Succeeded by: G. Gupta D
- Constituency: Murwara

Personal details
- Party: Socialist Party

Ramdas a.k.a. Lallu Bhaiya was an Indian politician from the state of the Madhya Pradesh. He represented Murwara constituency of undivided Madhya Pradesh Legislative Assembly by winning General election of 1957. He was elected from the same seat in the 1962 Madhya Pradesh Legislative Assembly election.
