= Bharatiya Janshakti Party =

- Chairman: Uma Bharati
- Founded: 30 April 2006
- Dissolved: 29 June 2011
- Split from: Bharatiya Janata Party
- Merged into: Bharatiya Janata Party
- Headquarters: New Delhi
- Newspaper: Janshakti Sandesh
- Ideology: Hindutva; Swadeshi
- Colours: Saffron

The Bharatiya Janshakti Party (BJSP; IAST: Bhāratiya Janaśakti Pārtī; "Indian People's Power Party") was founded on 30 April 2006 in Ujjain in the state of Madhya Pradesh, India. It was founded by Uma Bharti, a former leader of the Bharatiya Janata Party (BJP), following her expulsion from the BJP for "indiscipline".

She stated that the Bharatiya Janshakti Party was subject to the Rashtriya Swayamsevak Sangh, an institution preeminent in India for being the ideological parent body for a number of powerful Hindu nationalist groups in India, and had secured from that organization its support. With Uma Bharti rejoining the BJP in June 2011, the Bharatiya Janshakti Party would be merged with the BJP. BJSP working president Sangh Priya Gautam announced the merger here in the presence of BJP national president Nitin Gadkari, Uma Bharti and other senior leaders.

The Bharatiya Janshakti Party had a marked lack of political success in its five-year career; Bharti later stated that she severely regretted the time she spent outside the BJP. In the 2008 State Assembly Elections, the party won only 6 out of the 230 seats in the State Legislative Assembly.
