= Badwara =

- Town
- Location in Madhya Pradesh, India Badwara (India)
- Coordinates: 23.72°N 80.59°E
- Country: India
- State: Madhya Pradesh
- District: Katni

Government
  - Type: Panchayat Samiti
  - Body: Badwara Panchayat Samiti

Area
  - Total: 487 km^{2} (188 sq mi)

Population (2011)
  - Total: 104,196
  - Density: 214/km^{2} (554/sq mi)

Languages
  - Official: Hindi
- Time zone: UTC+5:30 (IST)
- Postal code: 483773
- ISO 3166 code: IN-MP
- Vehicle registration: MP

Badwara is a census town and tehsil located in Katni district in the Indian state of Madhya Pradesh. 106 villages are in Badwara Tehsil. It comes under Badwara Panchayath. It belongs to Jabalpur Division. It is located 24 km towards east from District headquarters Katni. 382 km from state capital Bhopal.

Badwara is surrounded by Katni Tehsil to the west, Murwara Tehsil to the west, Vijayraghavgarh Tehsil to the north, Chandia Tehsil to the east.

== Transport ==
By Rail

Badwara's railway station is Rupaund Railway Station

By Road

Badwara is located in NH-78 (Katni To Gumla)

== Education ==
Schools in the town with Hindi and English language classes are SGPS Badwara, GGMS Badwara, Jawahar Navoday Vidhyalaya Badwara, Sharda Model Ms Badwara, Sar. Shishu Man. Badwara and Govt. Degree College Badwara.
