= Laljiram Malviya =

Indian politician

Laljiram Malviya is an Indian politician from Agar Malwa district in Madhya Pradesh state of Republic of India. He was a member of the Madhya Pradesh Legislative Assembly during 2008–2013 and was elected from Agar constituency. He is member of Bhartiya Janata Party.
