= Dhimarkheda =

- Town
- Location in Madhya Pradesh, India
- Coordinates: 23.472°N 80.378°E
- Country: India
- State: Madhya Pradesh
- District: Katni district

Dhimarkheda is a Tehsil of Katni District, in the state of Madhya Pradesh, India. It's a Tehsil Headquarter and tehsil has 221 villages in its jurisdiction.
