= Katni River =

River in Madhya Pradesh, India

Coordinates: 23°58′N 80°38′E

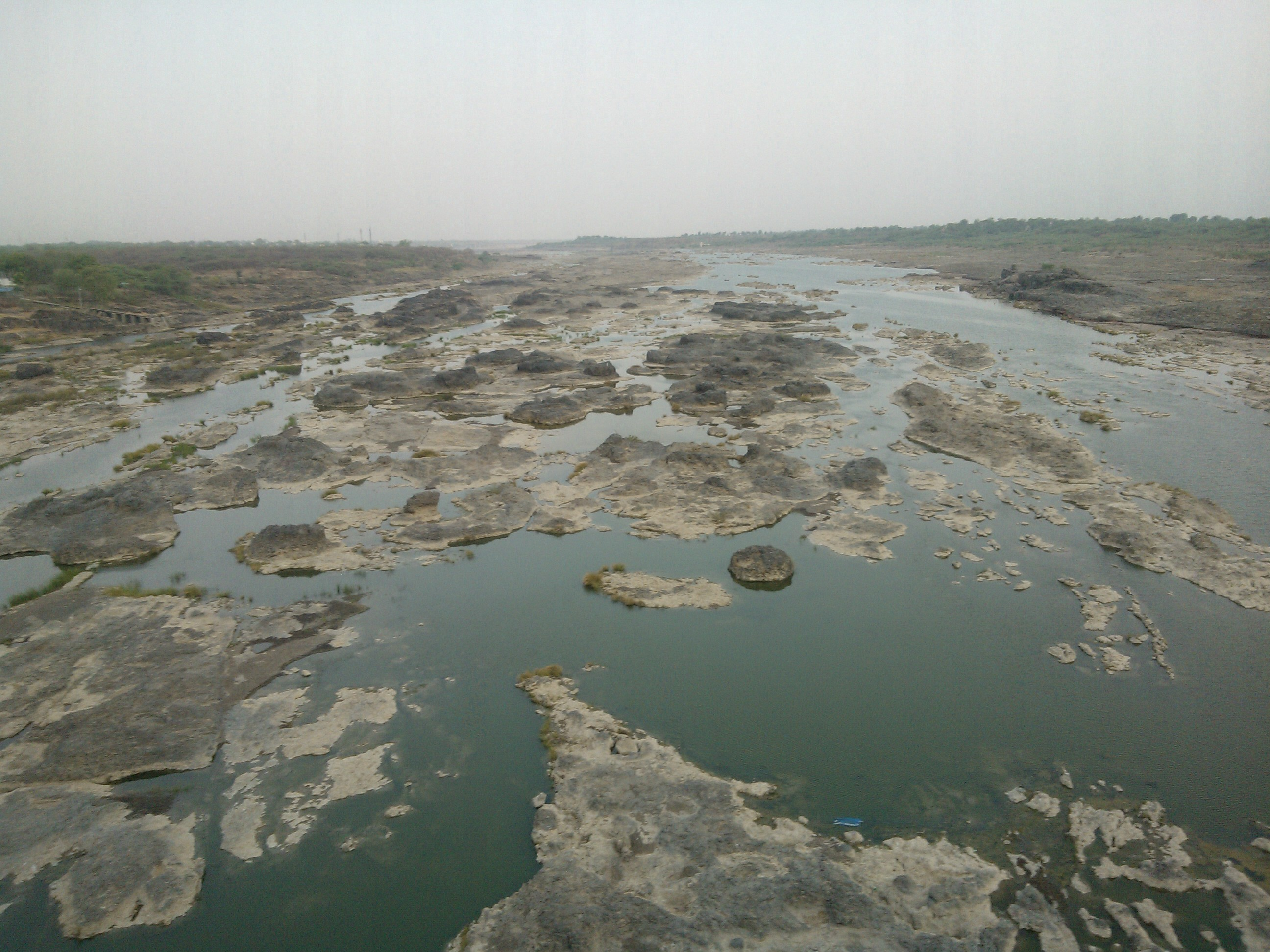
Drought affected Katni river in 2016

Katni River is a river that flows through the Katni District in the state of Madhya Pradesh, India. Located in the northeastern part of India. The river was named after Katewa, a gotra of Jats now found in the state of Rajasthan. Katewa built a fort on the river's banks for the Janapada of Katewa during their rule of the area.

== See also ==
- Katewa
