= Katni district =

- District of Madhya Pradesh
- Katni district
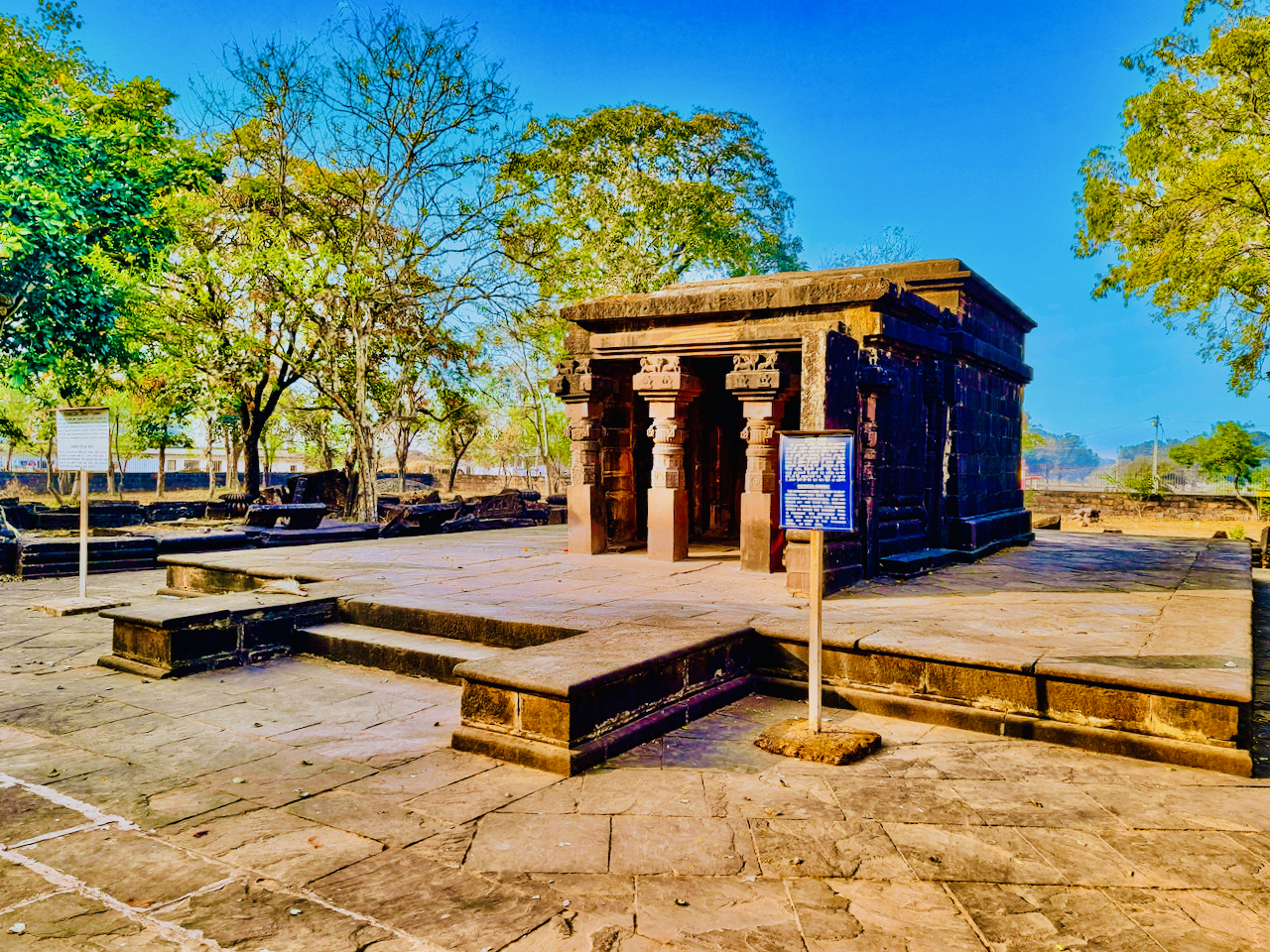
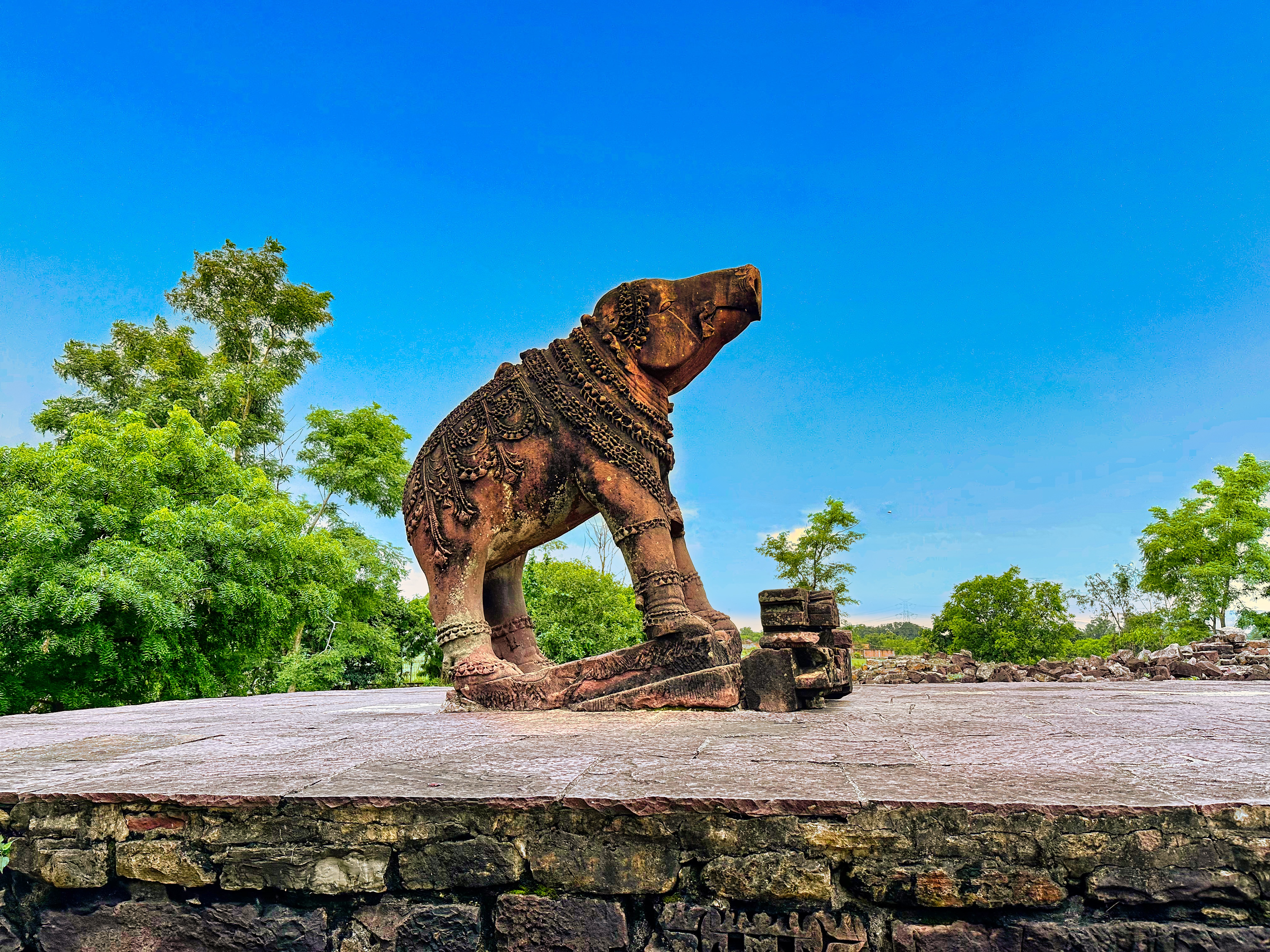
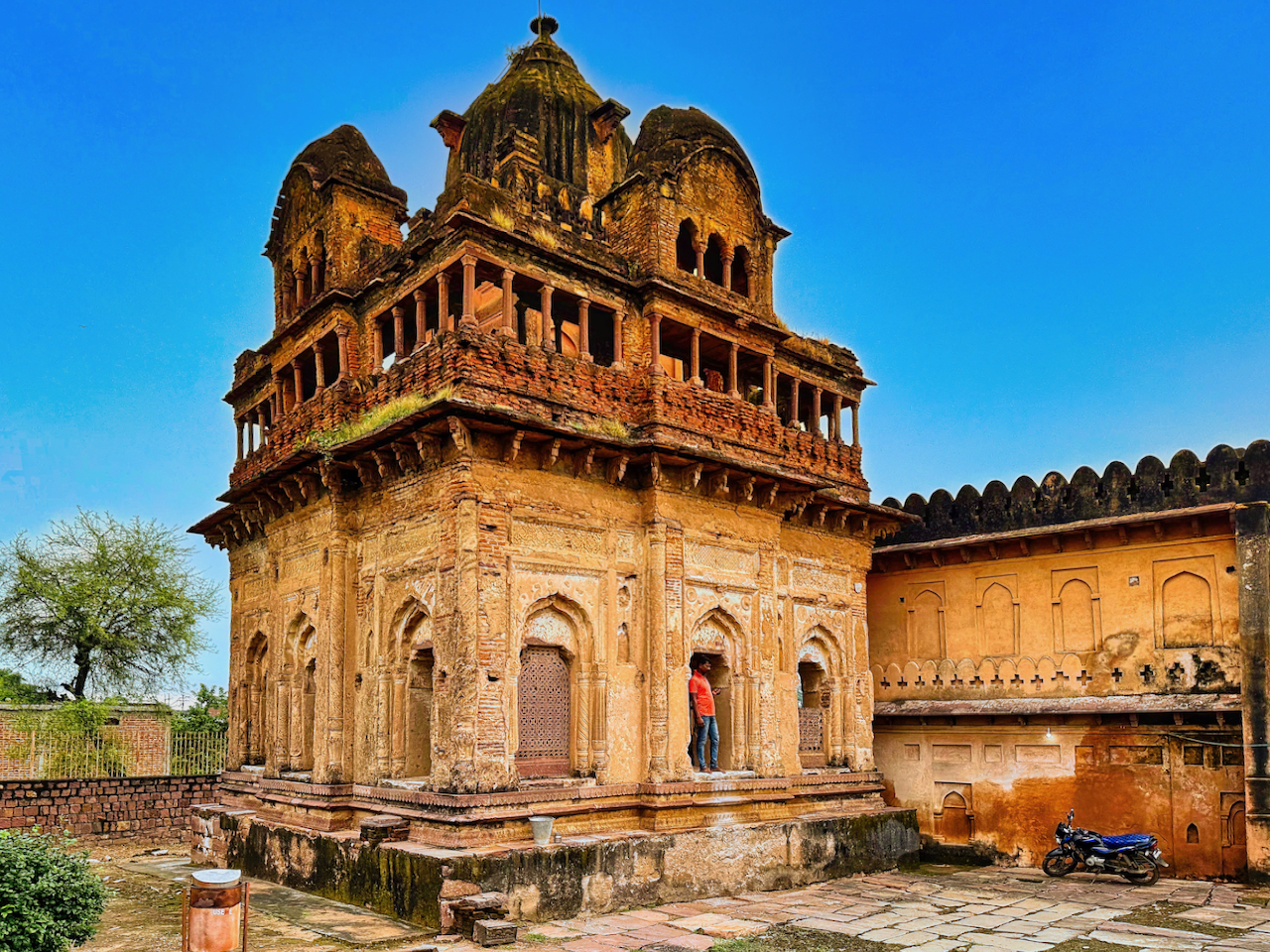
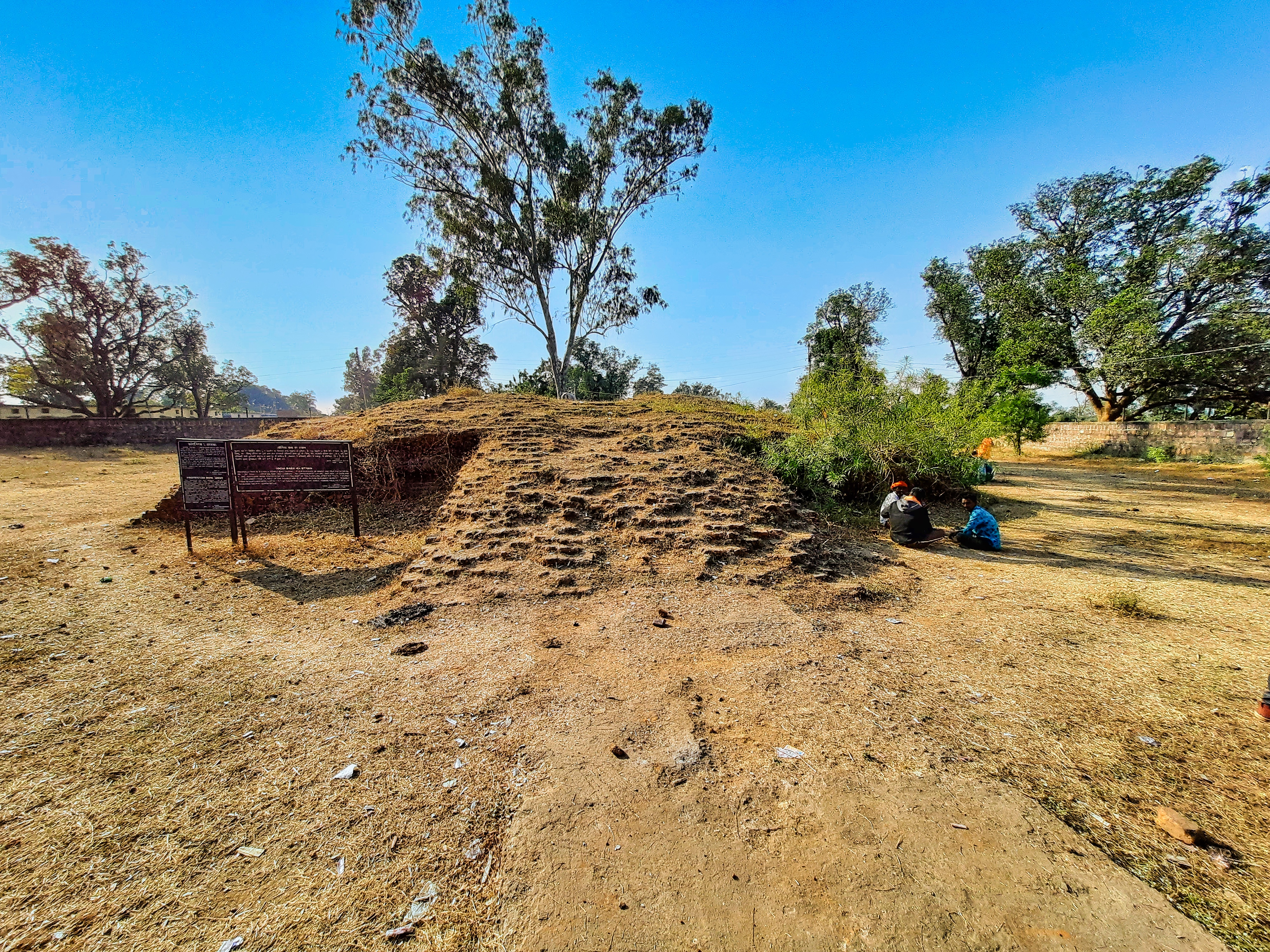
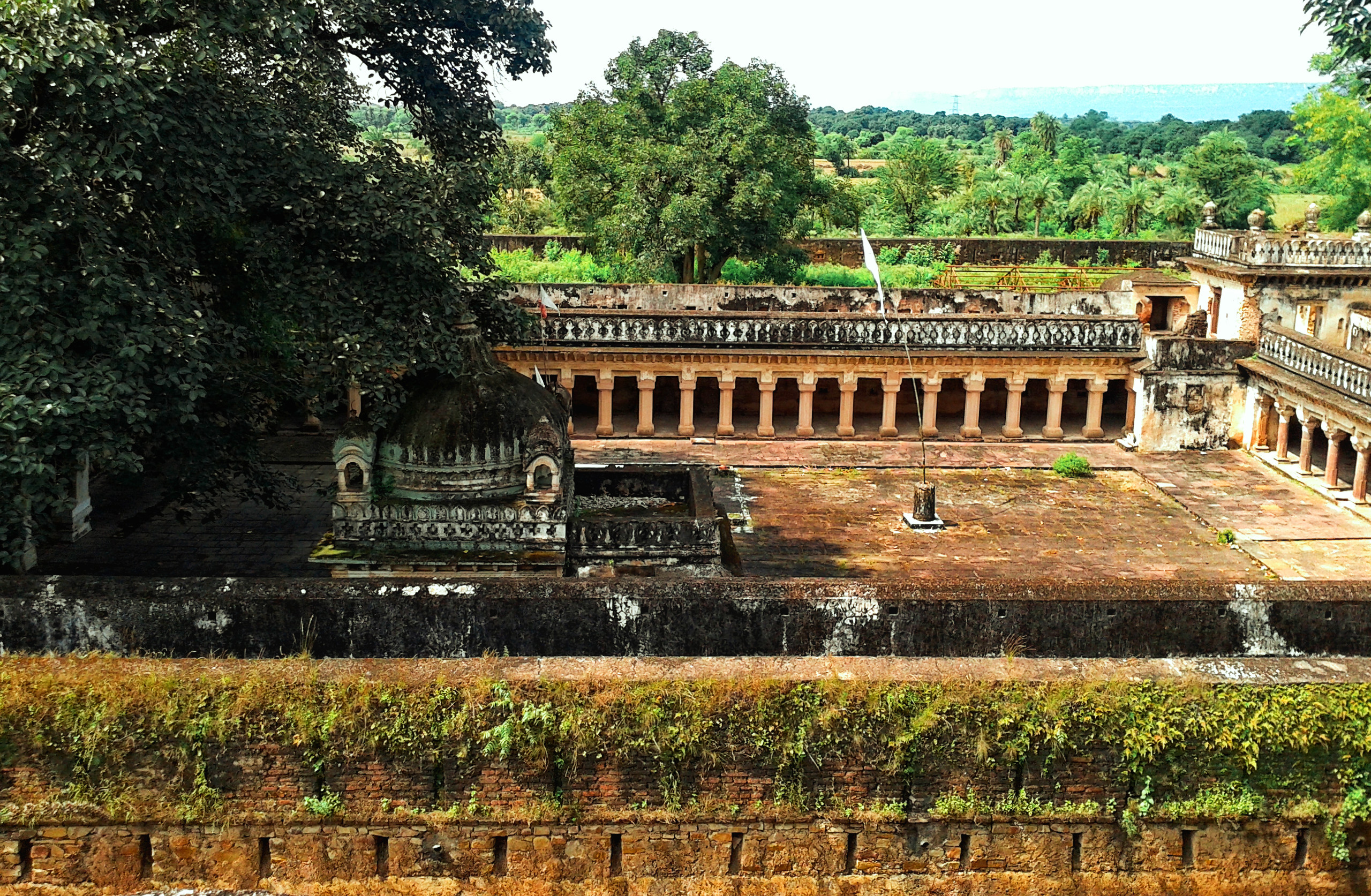
- Clockwise from top-left: Tigawa Temples, Vishnu Varaha temples in Karitalai Karanpur, foundation in Dhitwara, Vijayraghav Fort, Tapasi Matha in Bilhari

- Location of Katni District in Madhya Pradesh
- Coordinates (Katni): 23°43′30″N 80°16′50″E
- Country: India
- State: Madhya Pradesh
- Division: Jabalpur
- Headquarters: Katni
- Tehsils: List: 7; 1. Badwara; 2. Bahoriband; 3. Barhi; 4. Dhimarkheda; 5. Murwara; 6. Rithi; 7. Vijayraghavgarh; 8. Sleemanabad

Government
  - District Magistrate: Mr. Ashish Tiwari IAS
  - Superintendent of Police: Mr. Abhinay Vishwakarma IPS

Area
  - Total: 4,949 km^{2} (1,911 sq mi)

Population (2011)
  - Total: 1,292,042
  - Density: 261.1/km^{2} (676.2/sq mi)
  - Urban: 263,543

Demographics
  - Literacy: 73.62%
  - Sex ratio: 948
- Time zone: UTC+05:30 (IST)
- Website: katni.nic.in

Katni district (Hindi pronunciation: [kəʈn̪iː]), also known as Murwara district (Hindi: [mʊɽʋaːɾaː]), is one of the 55 districts of Madhya Pradesh state in central India. The town of Katni (Murwara) is the District headquarters. The District is part of Jabalpur Division. The District occupies an area of 4949.59 km^{2}.

== Geography ==
Katni is located in the central part of Madhya Pradesh with the headquarters at Katni town. It is one of the district of Jabalpur division. Katni is conglomeration of culture from three different cultural states viz. Mahakausal, Bundelkhand, and Baghelkhand. There are three different stories which reveals why Katni is called Mudwara. Katni River and Chhoti Mahanadi is Major Riveres of the District.

== Economy ==
Katni is a City in Madhya Pradesh. It is also one of the largest rail junctions in the country and the second biggest diesel shed in the country is also located here. Katni is also a Mineral and Marble-rich district, especially known for lime stone and bauxite.

Many Cement and Marbel's factories are located in Katni District. Railway's Electric loco shed and Ordinance Factory also situated in katni.

In 2006 the Ministry of Panchayati Raj named Katni one of the country's 250 most backward districts (out of a total of 640). It is one of the 24 districts in Madhya Pradesh currently receiving funds from the Backward Regions Grant Fund Programme (BRGF).

== Demographics ==
Historical population
Year	Pop.	±% p.a.
1901	249,049	—
1911	272,920	+0.92%
1921	272,832	−0.00%
1931	283,025	+0.37%
1941	333,078	+1.64%
1951	383,027	+1.41%
1961	452,246	+1.68%
1971	566,145	+2.27%
1981	714,508	+2.35%
1991	881,925	+2.13%
2001	1,064,167	+1.90%
2011	1,292,042	+1.96%

Religions in Katni district (2011)
Religion	Percent
Hinduism	96.02%
Islam	2.88%
Jainism	0.41%
Other or not stated	0.69%

According to the 2011 census Katni District has a population of 1,292,042, roughly equal to the nation of Estonia or the US state of New Hampshire. This gives it a ranking of 379th in India (out of a total of 640).

The district has a population density of 261 inhabitants per square kilometre (680/sq mi). Its population growth rate over the decade 2001-2011 was 21.38%. Katni has a sex ratio of 948 females for every 1000 males and a literacy rate of 73.62%. 20.41% of the population lives in urban areas. Scheduled Castes and Scheduled Tribes make up 12.05% and 24.59% of the population respectively.

Kols are the largest tribal group which is 41% of the tribal population, while Gonds (34%) and Bharias (20%) are the other major tribes.

Languages of Katni district (2011)
1. Hindi (98.0%)
2. Sindhi (1.56%)
3. Others (0.46%)

At the time of the 2011 Census of India, 97.98% of the population in the district spoke Hindi and 1.56% Sindhi as their first language.

== Notable people ==
- Motilal Verma (1906–1993), political figure
- Ramdas (politician), Indian Politician
- Pinky Maidasani, Singer and Rapper
- Sanjay Pathak, Indian Politician
- Akshat Khamparia, chess Player
- Giriraj Poddar, Indian Politician

== Places of interest ==
Badera Chaturyug Dham Temple is a temple located in Badera Village of Katni district of Madhya Pradesh and is a very holy and popular religious place. This temple is just 15 K.M. away from Katni. This temple is a 5-story building, in which every floor has a temple of the deity of the Yugas(ages) mentioned in the Hindu scriptures.

- Pushpawati Dham Bilahri
- Roopnath Dham, A religious site with a Panchaliga statue of Lord Shiva and inscriptions related to the Mauryan emperor Ashoka
- Vijayraghavgarh Fort, A 19th-century fort with historical significance, located about 35 km from Katni. It features temples, a rang mahal, and other structures.
- Sharda mata Mandir Vijayraghavgarh
- Vasudha Fall - water falls.

== See also ==
- Umaria Pan
