= Katni =

Katni Murwara
- City
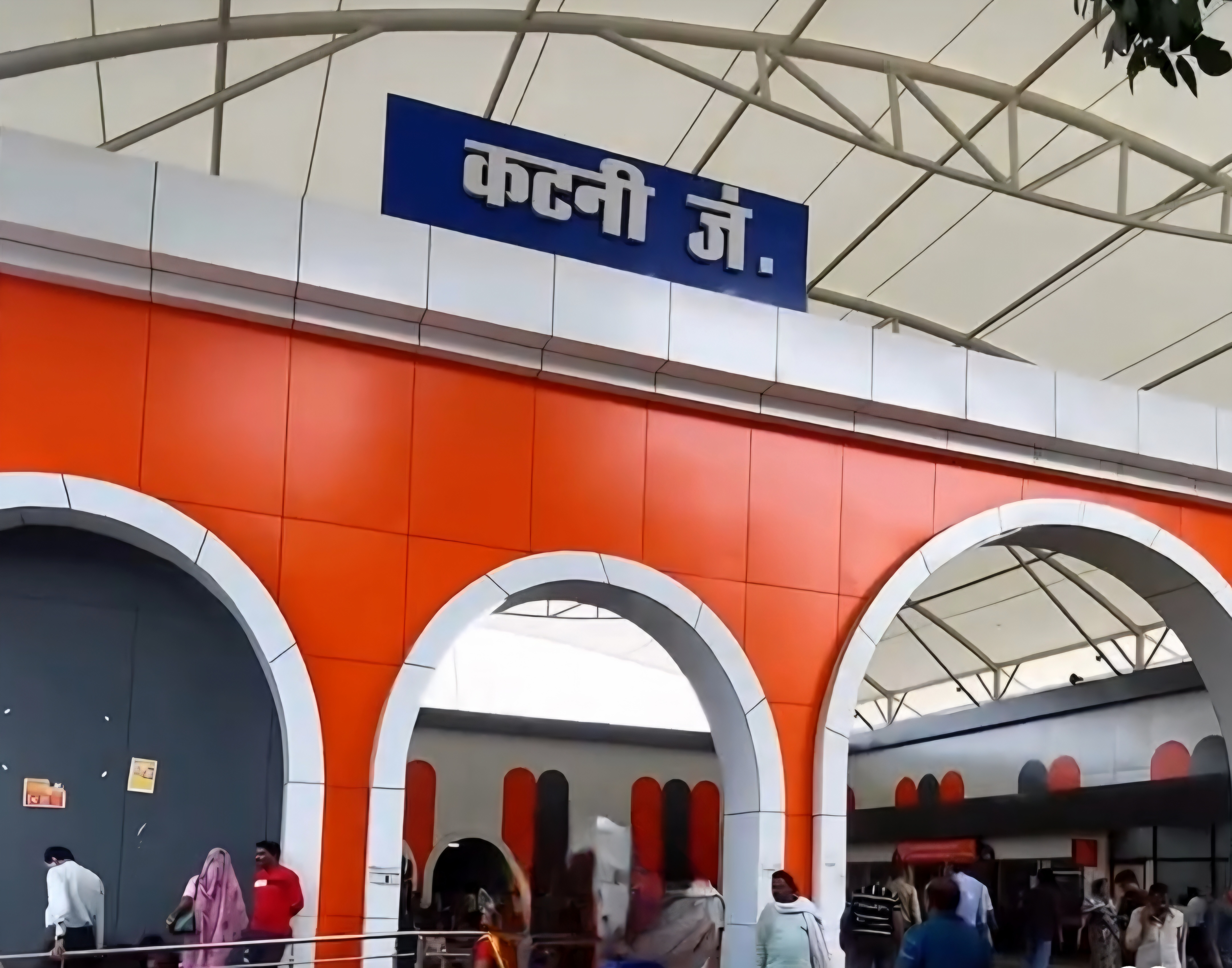
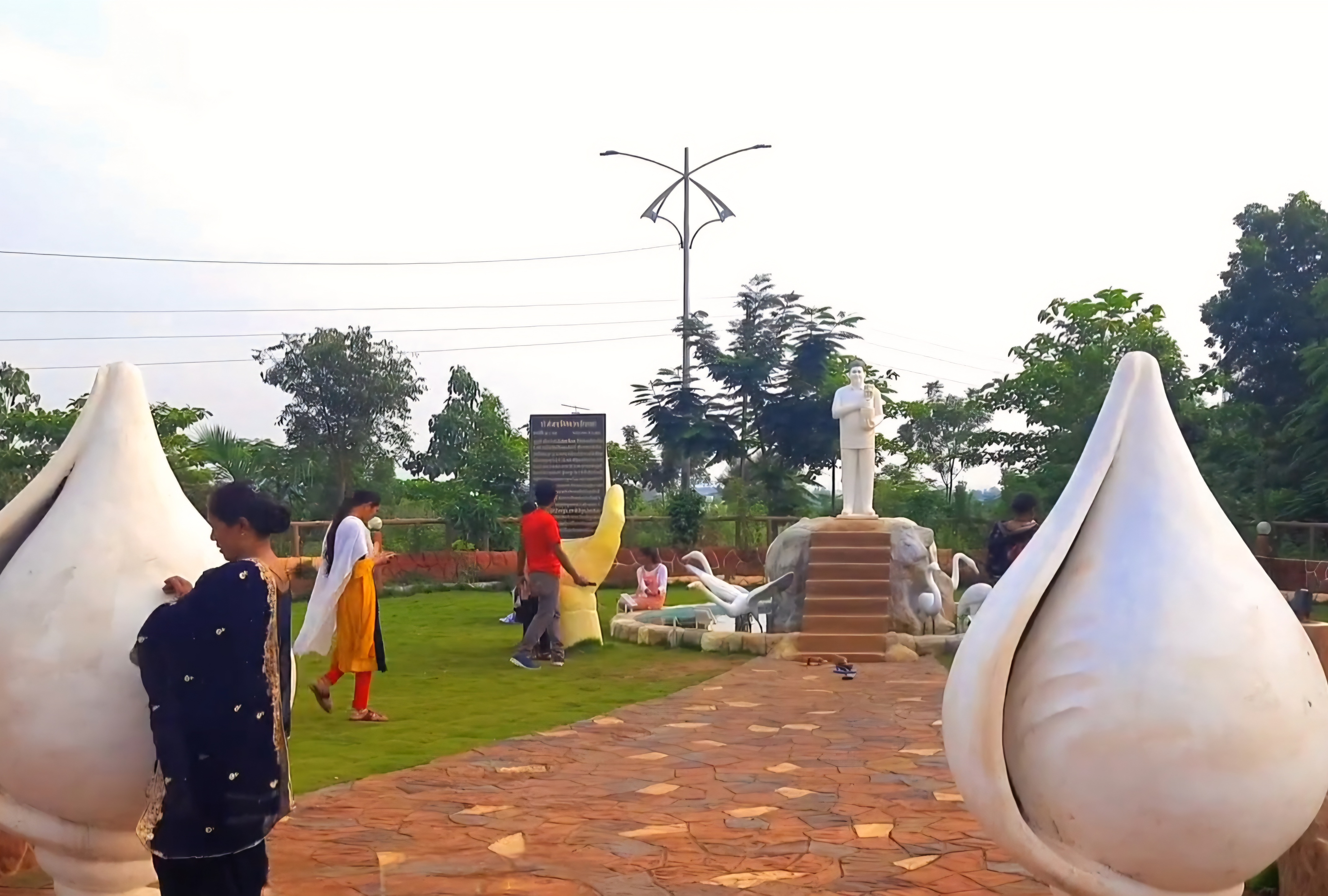
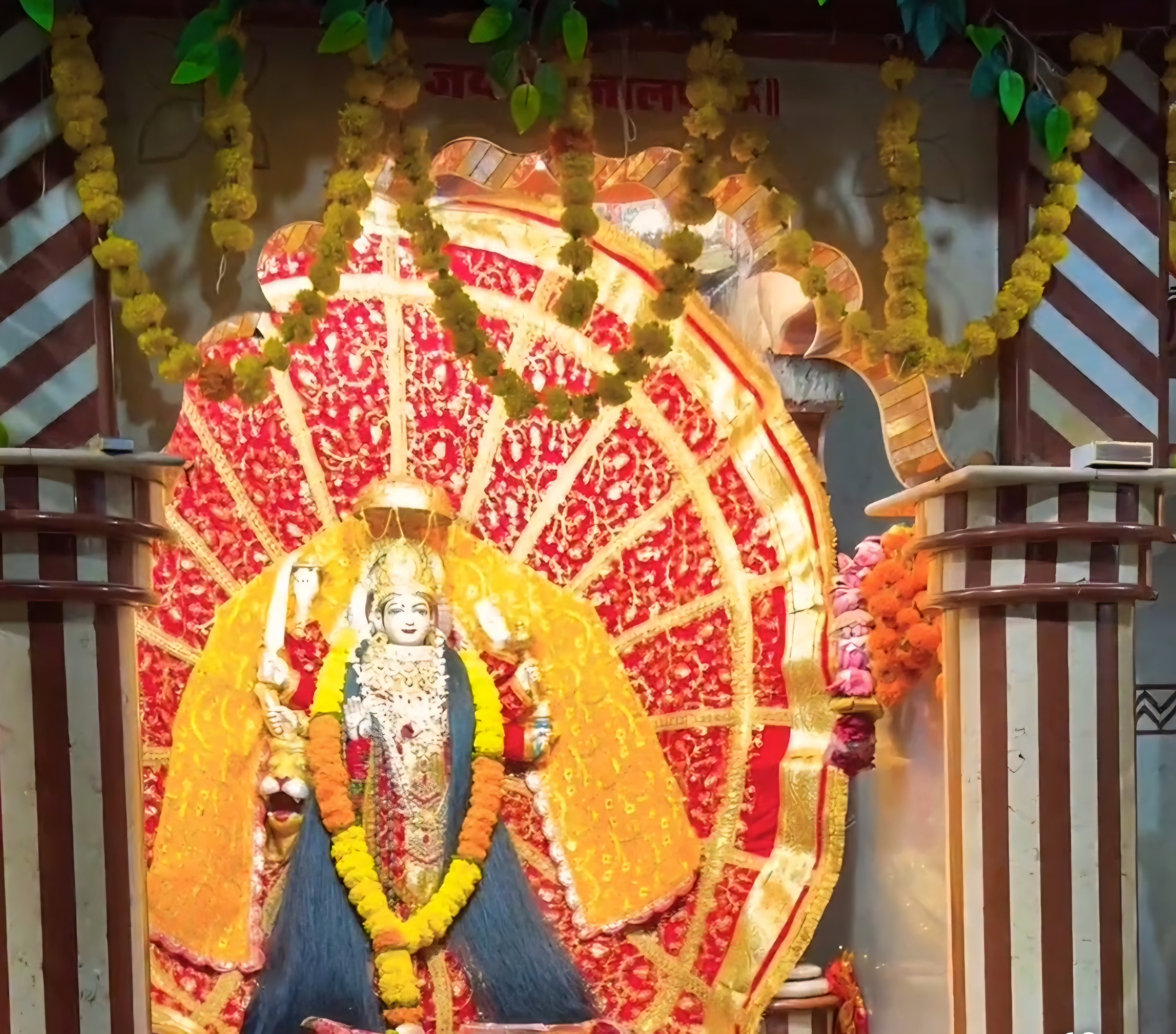
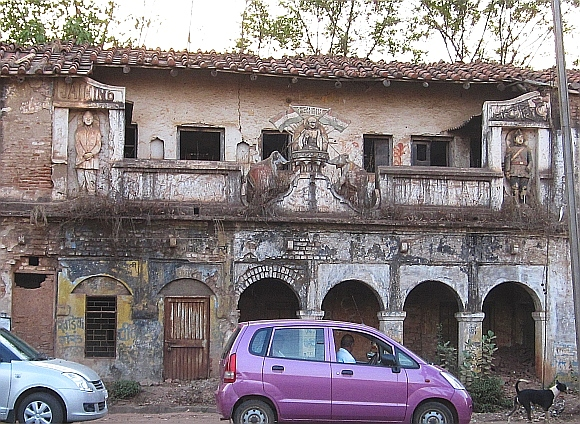
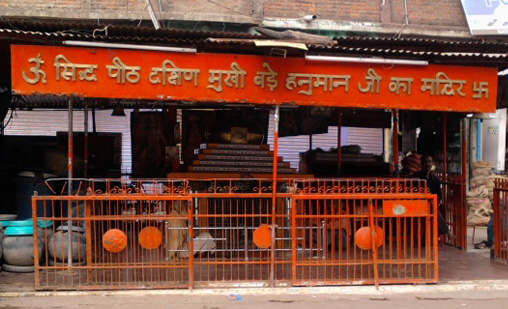
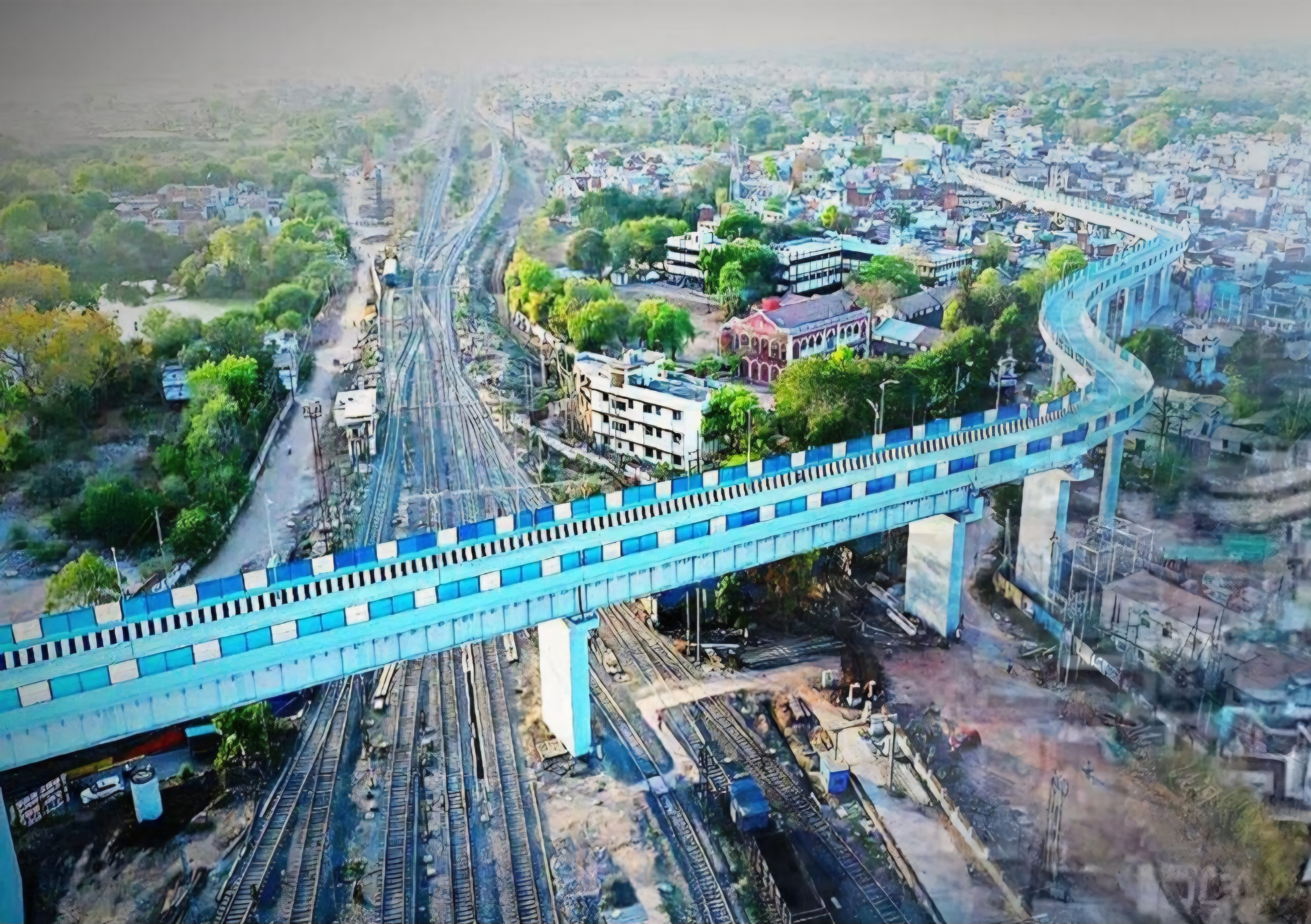
- Katni Junction Jagrati Park Jalpa Madhiya 1930s Building (From British Period) Dakshin Mukhi Hanuman Mandir Jagannath Flyover

- Location in Madhya Pradesh, India Katni (India) Katni (Asia)
- Coordinates: 23.48°N 80.40°E
- Country: India
- State: Madhya Pradesh
- Region: Mahakoshal and Bundelkhand
- District: Katni district
- Established: 1880s

Government
  - Type: Mayor-Council
  - Body: Katni Municipal Corporation
  - Mayor: Preeti Sanjiv Suri
  - Member of Legislative Assembly (MLA): Sandeep Shriprasad Jaiswal
  - Member of Parliament (MP): Vishnu Datt Sharma

Area
  - Total: 63 km^{2} (24 sq mi)
  - Rank: 11th in MP
- Elevation: 304 m (997 ft)

Population (2011)
  - Total: 221,883
  - Rank: 11th in MP
  - Density: 3,521/km^{2} (9,120/sq mi)

Languages
  - Official: Hindi
- Time zone: UTC+5:30 (IST)
- PIN: 483501
- Telephone code: 07622
- Vehicle registration: MP-21
- Sex ratio: 952 female/1000 male
- Avg. Summer Temperature: 34.2 °C (93.6 °F)
- Avg. Winter Temperature: 16.6 °C (61.9 °F)
- Rainfall: 1112 mm
- Website: katni.nic.in kmckatni.com

Katni officially Murwara is a city on the banks of the Katni River in Madhya Pradesh, India. It is the administrative headquarters of Katni District. It is famous for its limestone and cement factories often referred as "City of Lime". It is in the Mahakoshal region of central India. The city is 90 km (56 mi) from the divisional headquarters of the region, Jabalpur.

== History ==
Katni has a history that dates back to ancient and medieval periods, when the region formed part of the larger Gondwana territory ruled by the Gond kings. During the 14th to 18th centuries, it came under the control of the Gond rulers of Garha-Katanga, notably Rani Durgavati, who ruled until her defeat by the Mughal forces of Akbar in 1564. The area later passed into the hands of the Marathas in the 18th century, particularly under the Bhonsle rulers of Nagpur. In 1818, following the defeat of the Marathas in the Third Anglo-Maratha War, Katni came under British control. The British developed it as an important railway junction in the late 19th century, significantly boosting trade in limestone and marble. After India's independence in 1947, Katni evolved into a key industrial and transport center in Madhya Pradesh. Today Katni is an important city and district in Madhya Pradesh famous for its rich minerals and cultural diversity.

== Geography ==
Katni is located on 23.82°N 80.39°E. It has an average elevation of 508 metres (1669 feet).

Katni River flows near Katni.

== Demographics ==
Religion in city of Katni (2011)
1. Hinduism (91.8%)
2. Islam (5.40%)
3. Jainism (1.30%)
4. Christianity (0.90%)
5. Other or Not stated (0.21%)
6. Sikhism (0.38%)
7. Buddhism (0.04%)

As of 2026 expected data, Katni municipality has a population of 3,31,000. Effective literacy was 92% out of which male literacy was 94% and female literacy was 90%.

== Government and Administration ==
Katni is part of Murwara Assembly. Murwara Assembly constituency is one of the 230 Vidhan Sabha (Legislative Assembly) constituencies of Madhya Pradesh state in central India.

Katni city is divided into 45 wards for which elections are held every 5 years. Katni Municipal Corporation has total administration over 47,488 houses to which it supplies basic amenities like water and sewerage. It is also authorized to build roads within Municipal Corporation limits and impose taxes on properties coming under its jurisdiction.

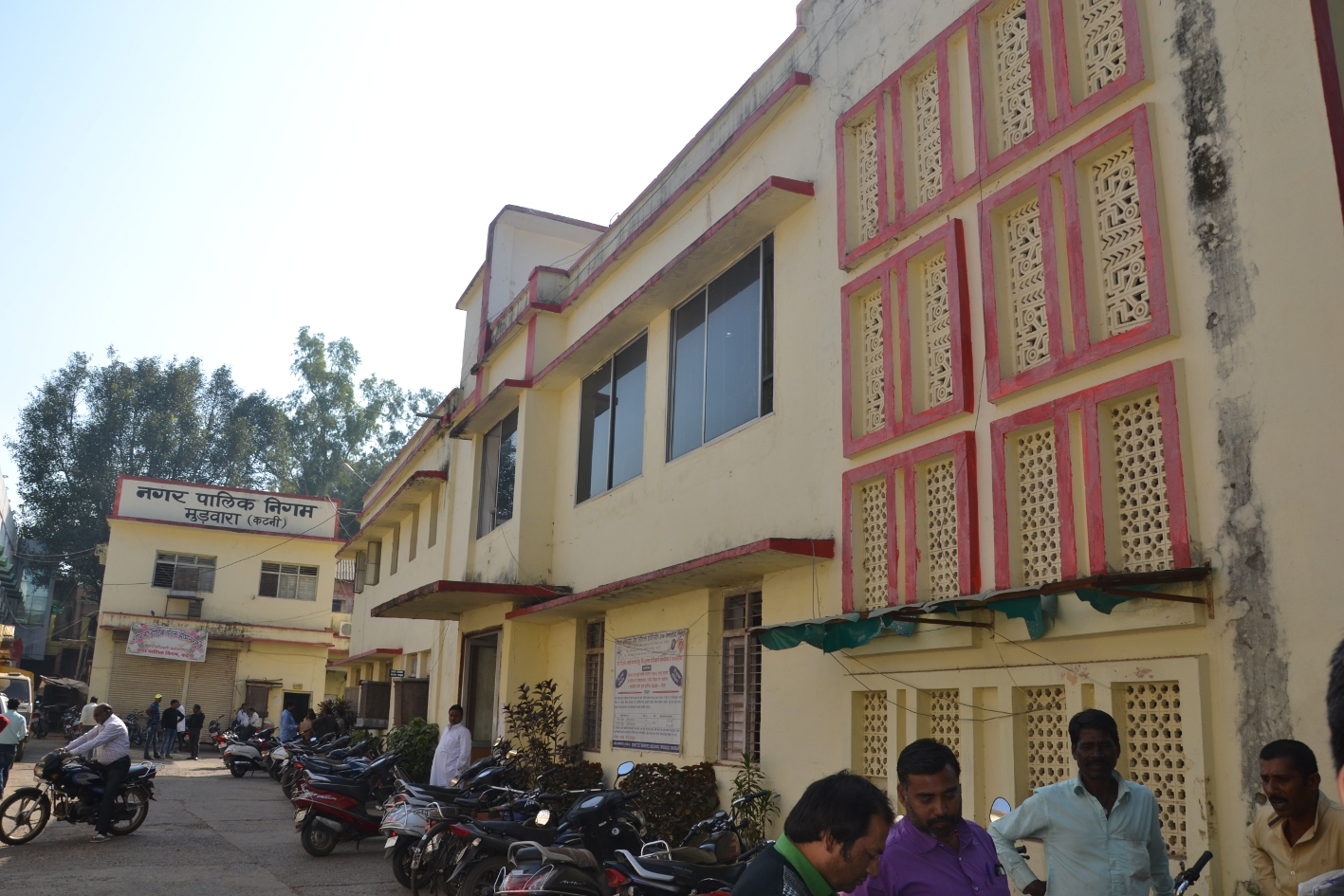
Katni Municipal Council Office

== Notable people ==
Sanjay Satyendra Pathak, famous politician

Sandeep Shriprasad Jaiswal, Famous MLA Motilal Verma (1906–1993), political figure

Ramdas (politician), Indian Politician

Pinky Maidasani, Singer and Rapper

Akshat Khamparia, chess Player

Giriraj Poddar, Indian Politician

== Education ==
Maharishi Mahesh Yogi Vedic University is an accredited, statutory private university located in Katni. It is part of the Maharishi Educational System and was established by the state legislature in 1995. It offers both graduate and undergraduate degree programs. Katni also has a number of CBSE, ICSE & MP Board affiliated private & government schools. It has branches of many world famous schools such as JPV DAV Public School & Delhi Public School.

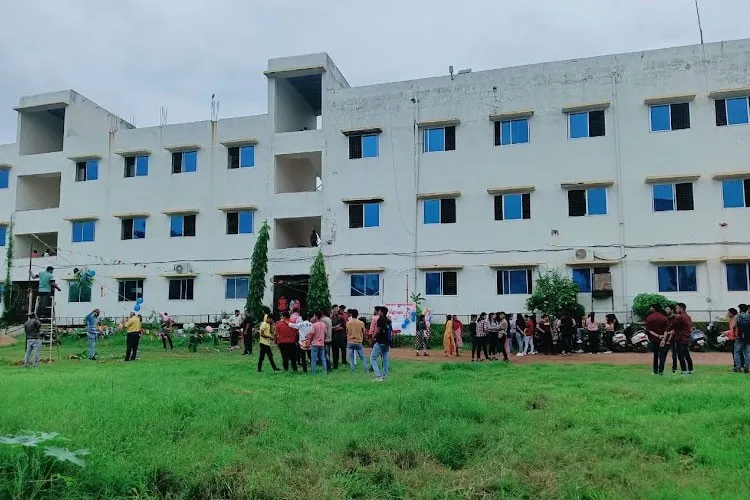
Arts and Commerce College Katni

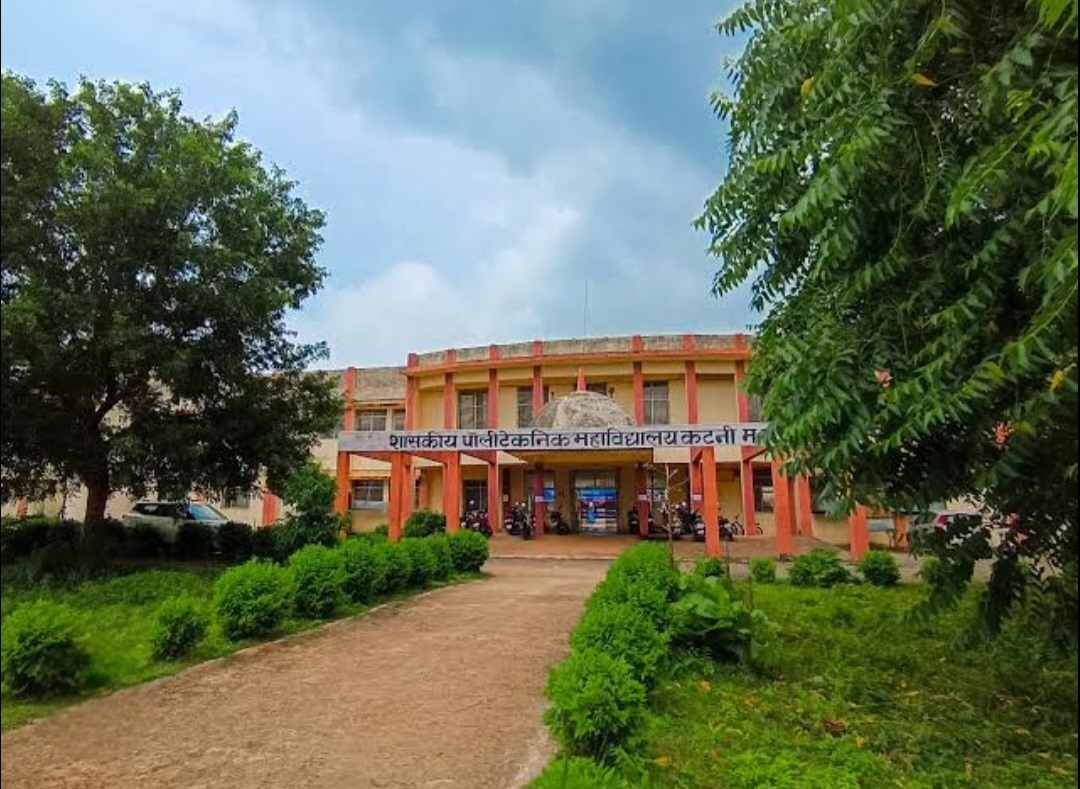
Polytechnic College Katni

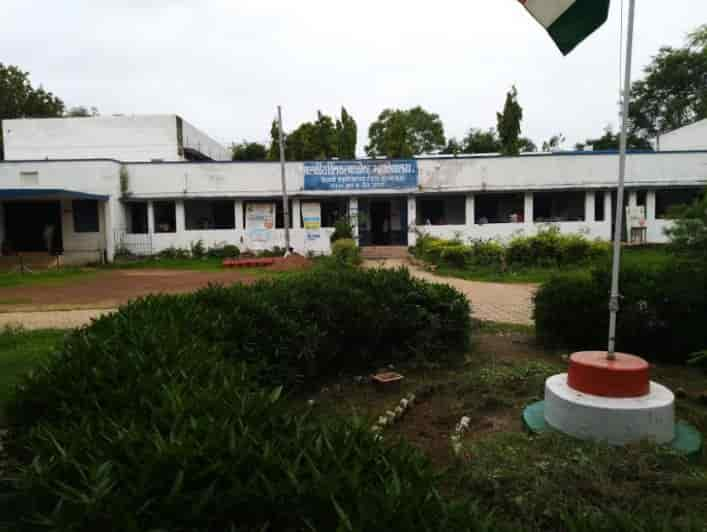
Tilak College Katni

== Economy ==
Katni has a strong economy. It has one of the largest railway junctions in the country and is home to the country's second largest diesel locomotive shed. The city is rich in minerals, particularly lime and bauxite. It has a GDP of ₹56k Crores and per capita income of ₹1.14 lacs

There are many cement and marble factories in Katni, and an ordnance factory situated in Katni.

== Transport ==
The nearest airport's to Katni is Jabalpur Airport, located in Jabalpur and Satna Airport, located in Satna.

Katni serves as a major railway hub in the country, providing connections to Satna in the east, Bina in the north, Bilaspur (Chhattisgarh) in the south, and Jabalpur in the west. Katni has the largest railway grade separator in India (33.4 kilometers). Katni is served by five main railway stations: Katni Junction, New Katni Junction, Katni Murwara, Madhavnagar Road and Katni South

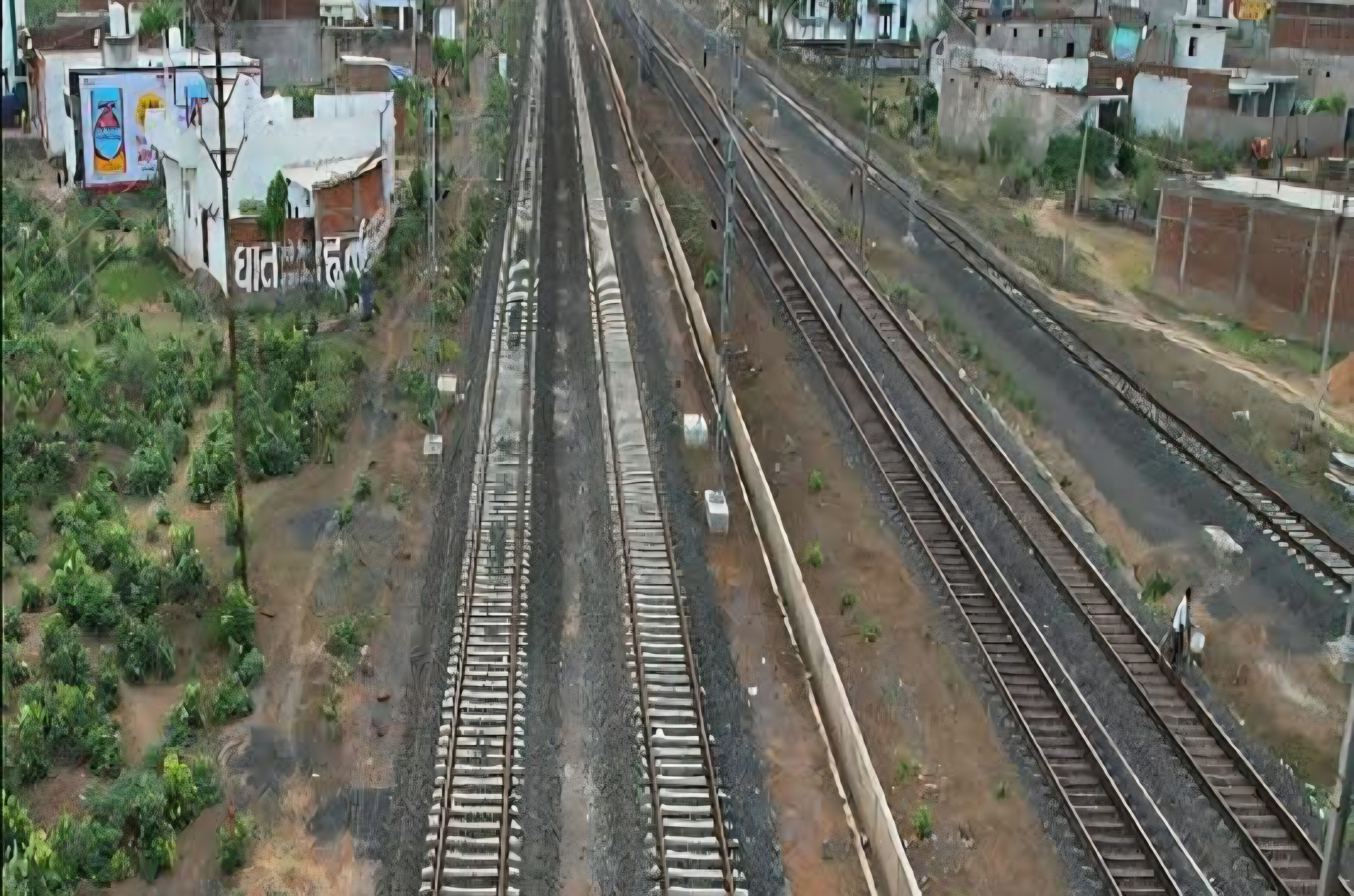

Katni is well connected by National Highways and State Highways to major cities of Madhya Pradesh, Chhattisgarh & Uttar Pradesh, making it an important transport hub. Major National Highways Include NH 43, NH 78 & NH 30.

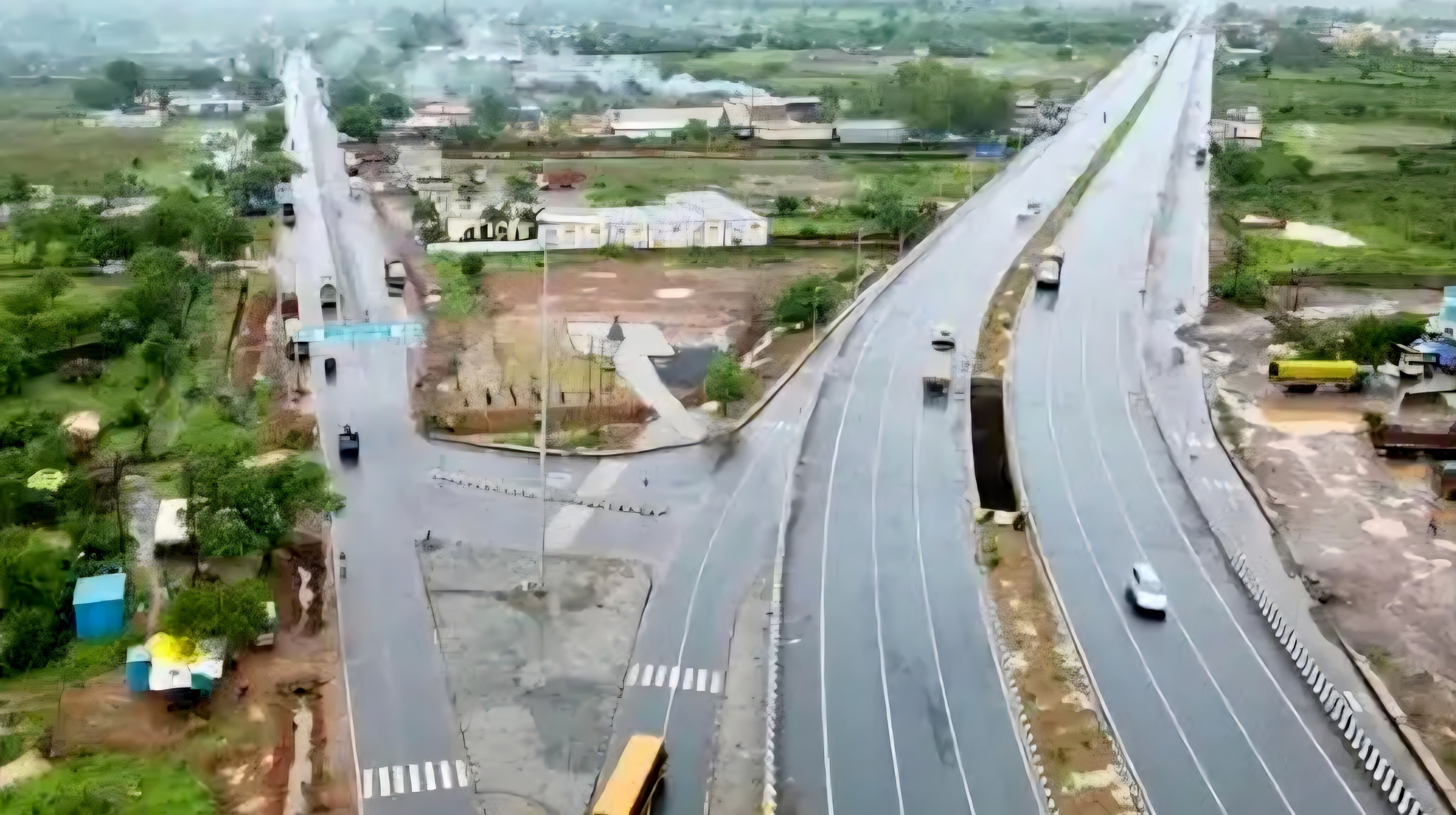

== See also ==
- Bandhavgarh National Park
- Vijayraghavgarh
- Keoti Falls
- Jabalpur
- Bahoriband Jain Temple
- Maa Sharda Mandir, Maihar
- Chitrakoot
- Kundalpur
