= Vijayraghavgarh =

- town
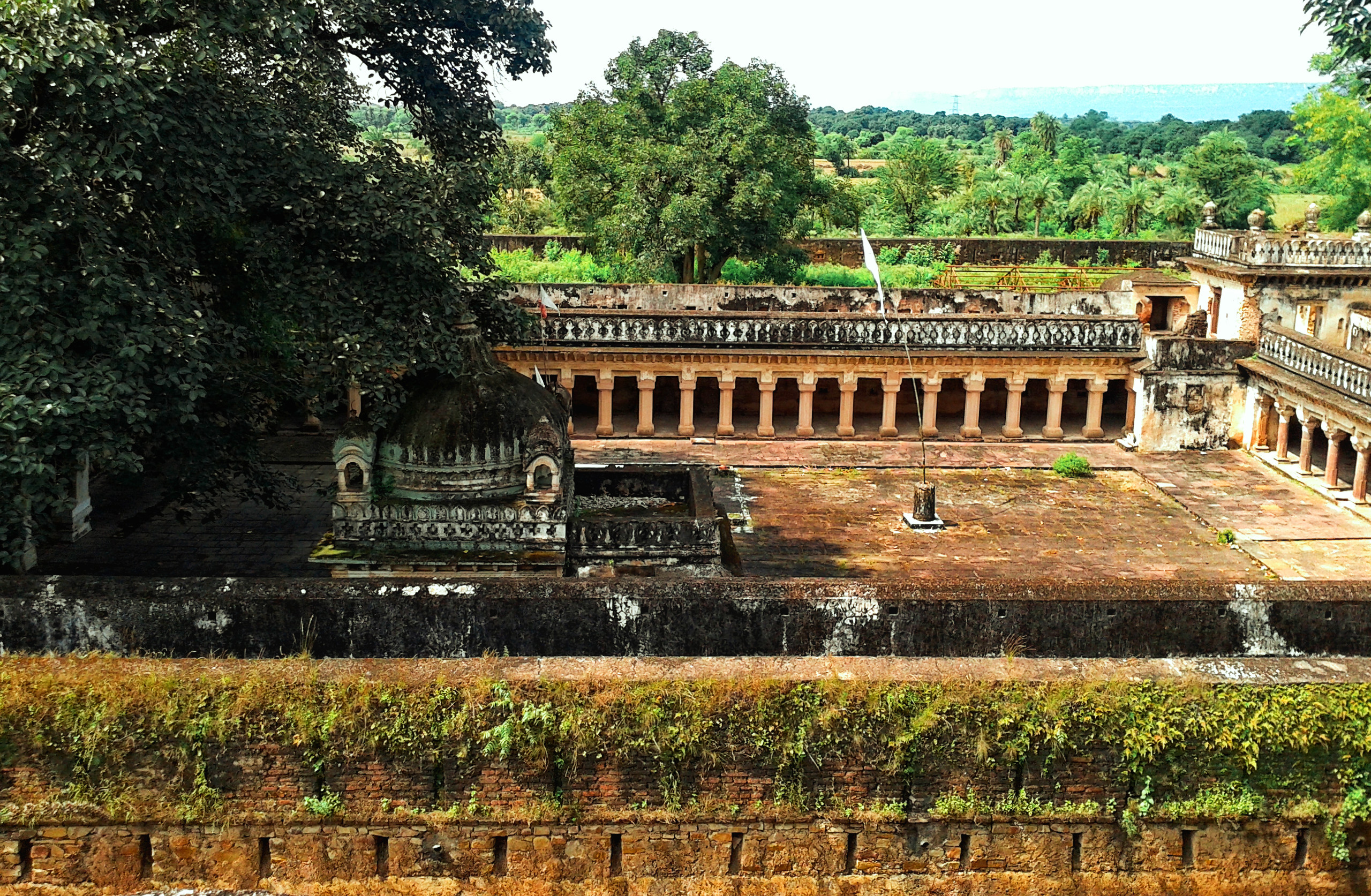
- Vijayraghav Fort

- Location in Madhya Pradesh, India Vijayraghavgarh (India)
- Coordinates: 23°59′45″N 80°36′18″E
- Country: India
- State: Madhya Pradesh
- District: Katni

Population (2011)
  - Total: 8,371

Languages
  - Official: Hindi
- Time zone: UTC+5:30 (IST)
- Telephone code: 07626
- Vehicle registration: MP-21
- Website: www.vgarh.blogspot.com

Vijayraghavgarh is a town, tehsil headquarters, and a nagar panchayat located in Katni district in the Indian state of Madhya Pradesh. It belongs to Jabalpur division and is 34 km (21 mi) east of district headquarters Katni.

== Demographics ==
As of 2001 India census, Vijayraghavgarh had a population of 7,157. Males constitute 53% of the population and females 47%. Vijayraghavgarh has an average literacy rate of 67%, higher than the national average of 59.5%: male literacy is 76%, and female literacy is 56%. In the town, 16% of the population is under 6 years of age.

== Geography ==
The STD code is 07626 and Pin code 483775 Postal headquarter. The nearest RTO is Katni. The town in accessible by road.
