= Kirnapur Assembly constituency =

Former constituency of the Madhya Pradesh legislative assembly

Coordinates: 21.62°N 80.33°E

Kirnapur
- Former constituency No. 179 for the Madhya Pradesh Legislative Assembly

Constituency details
- Country: India
- Region: Central India
- State: Madhya Pradesh
- District: Balaghat
- Lok Sabha constituency: Balaghat
- Established: 1962
- Abolished: 2008
- Total electors: 117,917 (2003)
- Reservation: None

Kirnapur is a former constituency of the Madhya Pradesh Legislative Assembly, in Madhya Pradesh state in central India. It was in existence from 1962 to 2008. It was one of the 8 Assembly constituencies located in Balaghat district.

Pushpalata Likhiram Kavre of the Indian National Congress party was the last MLA of this constituency from 2003-2008.

== Members of the Legislative Assembly ==
Year	Member	Party
1962	Moriram Odgu	Indian National Congress
1967	J. Singh	Indian National Congress
1972	Jhankarsingh Chandanlal	Indian National Congress
1977	Jhankarsingh Chandanlal	Indian National Congress
1980	Bhuwanlal Girmaji	Bharatiya Janata Party
1985	Bhuwanlal Girmaji	Bharatiya Janata Party
1990	Likhiram Kaware	Indian National Congress
1993	Likhiram Kaware	Indian National Congress
1998	Likhiram Kaware	Indian National Congress
2003	Pushpalata Likhiram Kavre	Indian National Congress

== Election results ==
=== 2003 ===
2003 Madhya Pradesh Legislative Assembly election: Kirnapur
Party	Candidate	Votes	%	±%
INC	Pushpalata Likhiram Kavre	25,934	28.44	
BJP	Lata	18,275	20.04	
Independent	Dileep	12,282	13.47%	
Majority		7,659		
Turnout		91,235		
INC hold		Swing		

== See also ==
- Balaghat district
- List of constituencies of the Madhya Pradesh Legislative Assembly
