= Bagli Assembly constituency =

Constituency of the Madhya Pradesh legislative assembly in India

Coordinates: 22.64°N 76.34°E

Bagali
- Constituency No. 174 for the Madhya Pradesh Legislative Assembly

Constituency details
- Country: India
- Region: Central India
- State: Madhya Pradesh
- District: Dewas
- Lok Sabha constituency: Khandwa
- Established: 1951
- Reservation: ST

Member of Legislative Assembly
- 16th Madhya Pradesh Legislative Assembly
- Incumbent Murli Bhawara
- Party: Bharatiya Janata Party
- Elected year: 2023
- Preceded by: Pahadsingh Kannoje

Bagli Assembly constituency, also spelled Bagali, is one of the seats in Madhya Pradesh Legislative Assembly in India. It is a segment of Khandwa Lok Sabha constituency. The constituency was reserved for Scheduled Tribes in 2008. Previously it was the long time seat of former Chief Minister Kailash Chandra Joshi and is a BJP bastion.

== Members of the Legislative Assembly ==
=== Madhya Bharat Legislative Assembly ===
Election	Name	Party
1952	Mishrilal Gangwal	Indian National Congress

=== Madhya Pradesh Legislative Assembly ===
Election	Name	Party
1957	Kailash Chandra Joshi	Bharatiya Jana Sangh
1962	Kailash Chandra Joshi	Bharatiya Jana Sangh
1967	Kailash Chandra Joshi	Bharatiya Jana Sangh
1972	Kailash Chandra Joshi	Bharatiya Jana Sangh
1977	Kailash Chandra Joshi	Janata Party
1980	Kailash Chandra Joshi	Bharatiya Janata Party
1985	Kailash Chandra Joshi	Bharatiya Janata Party
1990	Kailash Chandra Joshi	Bharatiya Janata Party
1993	Kailash Chandra Joshi	Bharatiya Janata Party
1998	Shyam Holani	Indian National Congress
2003	Deepak Joshi	Bharatiya Janata Party
2008	Champalal Devda	Bharatiya Janata Party
2013	Champalal Devda	Bharatiya Janata Party
2018	Pahadsingh Kannoje	Bharatiya Janata Party
2023	Murli Bhawara	Bharatiya Janata Party

== Election results ==
=== 2023 ===
2023 Madhya Pradesh Legislative Assembly election: Bagli
Party	Candidate	Votes	%	±%
BJP	Murli Bhawara	105,320	50.27	+1.94
INC	Gopal Bhosle	97,541	46.55	+4.62
NOTA	None of the above	1,608	0.77	−0.9
Majority		7,779	3.72	−2.68
Turnout		209,526	82.43	−0.95
BJP hold		Swing		

=== 2018 ===
2018 Madhya Pradesh Legislative Assembly election: Bagli
Party	Candidate	Votes	%	±%
BJP	Pahadsingh Kannoje	89,417	48.33	
INC	Kamal Waskale	77,574	41.93	
Independent	Tersingh Devda	8,234	4.45	
BSP	Mukesh Kumar Bhilala	2,136	1.15	
Independent	Suresh Morya	1,934	1.05	
NOTA	None of the above	3,086	1.67	
Majority		11,843	6.4	
Turnout		185,010	83.38	
BJP hold		Swing		

=== 2013 ===
2013 Madhya Pradesh Legislative Assembly election: Bagli
Party	Candidate	Votes	%	±%
BJP	Champalal Devda	87,580	55.62	
INC	Tersingh Devda	62,248	39.53	
NOTA	None of the Above	2,938	1.87	
BSP	Bheem Singh Morya	1,759	1.12	
IND	Rajendra-Kedar	1,070	0.68	
Majority		25,332	16.39	
Turnout		1,57,564	77.22	
BJP hold		Swing		

== See also ==
- Dewas district
- Bagli, Dewas
- Khandwa (Lok Sabha constituency)
