= Hatpipliya =

- Town
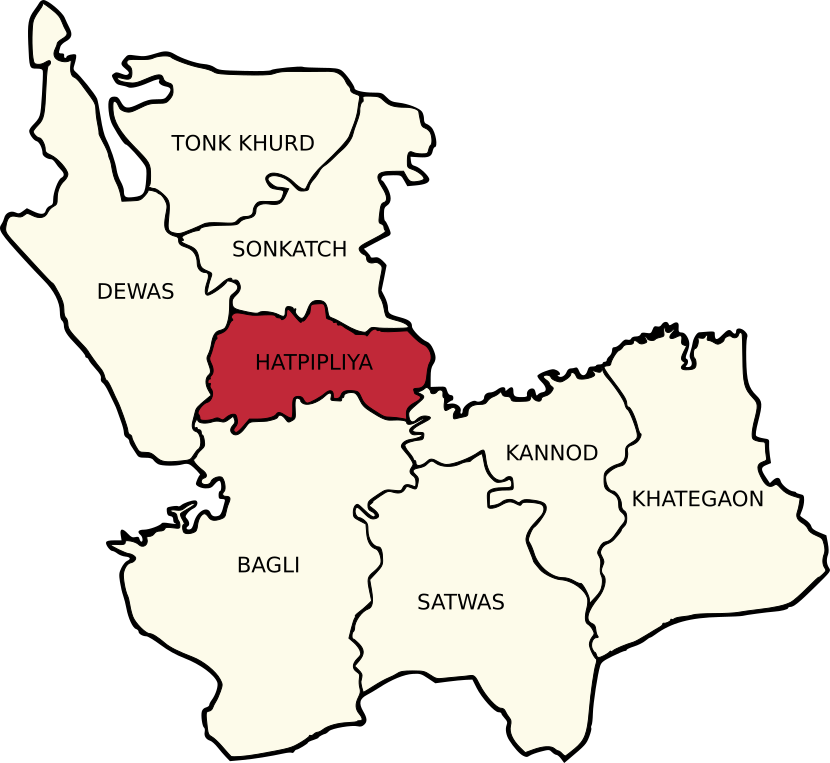
- Hatpipliya tehsil within Dewas district

- Location in Madhya Pradesh, India Hatpipliya (India)
- Coordinates: 22°46′12″N 76°18′0″E
- Country: India
- State: Madhya Pradesh
- Division: Ujjain
- District: Dewas
- Tehsil: Hatpipliya

Government
  - Type: Nagar parishad
  - Body: Hatpipliya Municipal Council

Area
  - Total: 2.21 km^{2} (0.85 sq mi)

Population (2011)
  - Total: 17,419
  - Density: 7,880/km^{2} (20,400/sq mi)

Languages
  - Official: Hindi and English
  - Other: Malwi
- Time zone: UTC+5:30 (IST)
- PIN: 455223
- Telephone code: 07271
- ISO 3166 code: IN-MP
- Vehicle registration: MP 41
- Website: Municipal Council

Hatpipalya is a town and a Nagar parishad in the Hatpipliya tehsil within Dewas district of the state of Madhya Pradesh, India. It lies 149 kilometres (93 mi) west of the state capital of Bhopal. Hatpipalya had a census-estimated 2011 population of 17,419, which makes it a Tier-4 city. The city is spread over an area of 2.21 square kilometres (0.85 sq mi).

== Geography ==
Hatpipliya lies about 7 kilometres (4.3 mi) north of the town of Chapda, 41 kilometres (25 mi) from the district headquarters of Dewas, and 55 kilometres (34 mi) east of Indore.

=== Climate ===
Hatpipliya lies on the Malwa Plateau. Due to its high elevation and inland location, even during the hottest months of the year, the nights are relatively cool, which is known as Shab-e-Malwa. Three distinct seasons are observed: summer, monsoon and winter. Hatpipliya gets moderate rainfall of 960 millimetres (38 in), mostly during July–September due to the southwest monsoon.

== Demographics ==
Historical population
Year	Pop.	±%
1961	5,620	—
1971	7,704	+37.1%
1981	9,995	+29.7%
1991	12,971	+29.8%
2001	15,933	+22.8%
2011	17,419	+9.3%

As of the 2011 India census, Hatpipalya had a population of 17,419. Males constitute 52% of the population and females 48%. Hatpipalya has an average literacy rate of 78.23%, male literacy is 87.31%, and female literacy is 68.74%. In Hatpipalya, 13.88% of the population is under 6 years of age.

According to local administrative estimates, the projected population of Hatpipliya town for 2025 is approximately 25,200. The 2011 Census of India recorded the town population at 17,419. Hatpipliya Tehsil had a total population of 106,612 as per the 2011 Census.

== Government and politics ==
=== Civic administration ===
Hatpipliya is administered by a Nagar Parishad (Municipal Council). Its responsibilities include sanitation, street lights, maintenance of birth and death records.

=== Representation in Parliament and State Assembly ===
At the state level, Hatpipliya falls within the Hatpipliya Assembly constituency, which covers most of the surrounding tehsil. As of November 2020, its representative in the Vidhan Sabha is Manoj Choudhary of the Bharatiya Janata Party.

At the national level, the city is falls within the Dewas (Lok Sabha constituency). As of 2019, its Member of Parliament is Mahendra Solanki of the Bharatiya Janata Party.

=== Law and order ===
The Dewas Police, a division of the Madhya Pradesh Police, under the direct control of Department of Home Affairs, Government of Madhya Pradesh is the law enforcement agency in Dewas. Dewas district is divided into 19 police stations and six police outposts. Hatpipliya itself has one police station.

=== Civic utility / Amenities ===
As of the 2011 census, Hatpipliya had 60 km (37 mi) of roads of which 48 km (30 mi) was paved. Amongst the medical facilities, it had 8 medical shops and 1 dispensary with 6 beds. Amongst the social, recreational and cultural facilities it had 1 theatre and 3 auditorium/community halls. It had 6 bank branches.

Hatpipliya lies about 7 kilometres (4.3 mi) north of the town of Chapda which is the junction to nearest National Highway (NH47), 41 kilometres (25 mi) south-east of the district headquarters of Dewas, which is home to the nearest Railway Station (Dewas Junction) and 55 kilometres (34 mi) east of Indore, which is home to the nearest Airport (Devi Ahilya Bai Holkar Airport).

== Famous persons ==
- Kailash Chandra Joshi, the 9th Chief Minister of Madhya Pradesh in the 1970s.

== Education ==
As of the 2011 census, Hatpipliya had 11 primary schools, 2 middle schools, 5 secondary schools, 4 senior secondary schools, 1 degree-level college and 1 non-formal education centre.

== See also ==
- Hatpipliya Assembly constituency
