= 2003 Madhya Pradesh Legislative Assembly election =

Indian state election

Madhya Pradesh Legislative Assembly Election 2003
- 27 November 2003

All 230 assembly constituencies 116 seats needed for a majority
- Registered: 37,936,518
- Turnout: 67.25% ▲7.03%
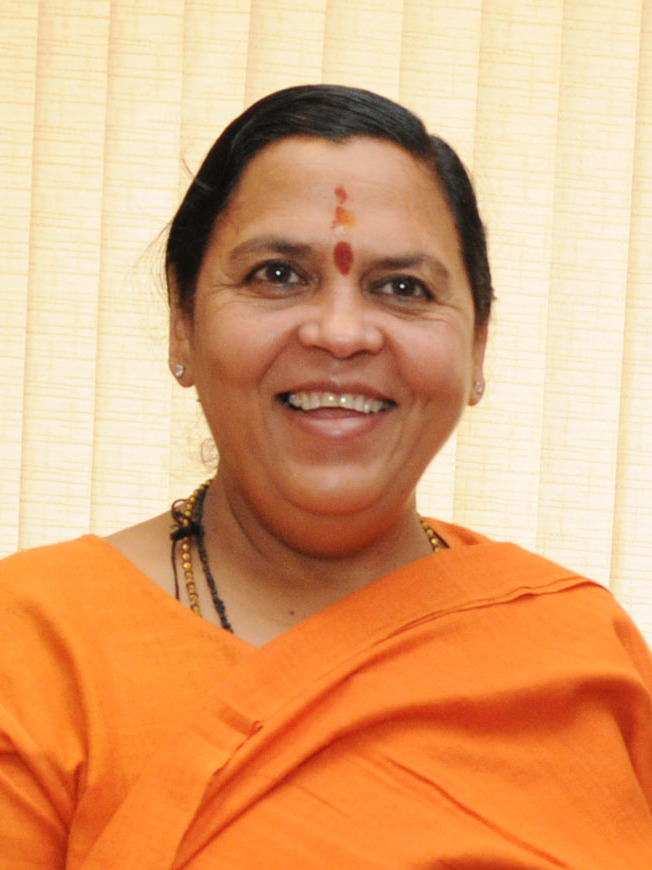

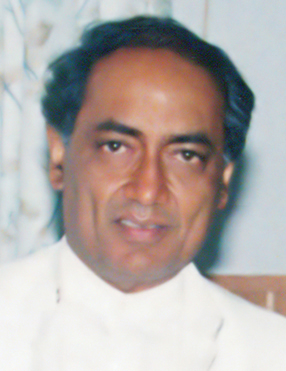

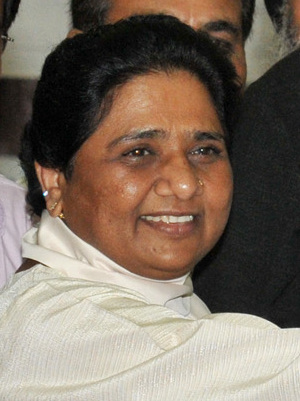
	Majority party	Minority party	Third party
Leader	Uma Bharti	Digvijaya Singh	Mayawati
Party	BJP	INC	BSP
Leader since	2003	1993	2003
Leader's seat	Malehra	Raghogarh	Did not contest
Last election	83	124	11
Seats won	173	38	2
Seat change	▲90	▼86	▼9
Popular vote	10,836,807	8,059,414	1,852,528
Percentage	42.50%	31.61%	7.26%
Swing	▲3.22%	▼8.89%	▲1.11%
Chief Minister before election
Digvijaya Singh
INC
Elected Chief Minister
Uma Bharti
BJP

Elections to the Madhya Pradesh Legislative Assembly were held on 27 November 2003. The Bharatiya Janata Party won a majority of seats and Uma Bharti was sworn in as the new Chief Minister.

== Result ==
Party	Votes	%	Seats	+/–
Bharatiya Janata Party	10,836,807	42.50	173	▲90
Indian National Congress	8,059,414	31.61	38	▼86
Bahujan Samaj Party	1,852,528	7.26	2	▼9
Samajwadi Party	946,891	3.71	7	▲3
Gondwana Ganatantra Party	517,270	2.03	3	▲2
Rashtriya Samanta Dal	335,058	1.31	2	New
Nationalist Congress Party	324,780	1.27	1	–
Janata Dal (United)	140,691	0.55	1	–
Communist Party of India (Marxist)	62,006	0.24	1	–
Others	460,403	1.81	0	0
Independents	1,964,442	7.70	2	–
Total	25,500,290	100.00	230	▼90
Valid votes	25,500,290	99.96		
Invalid/blank votes	10,221	0.04		
Total votes	25,510,511	100.00		
Registered voters/turnout	37,936,518	67.25		
Source: ECI

== Elected members ==
Constituency	Reserved for (SC/ST/None)	Member	Party
Sheopur	None	Durgalal Vijay	Bharatiya Janata Party
Bijeypur	None	Ramniwas	Indian National Congress
Sabalgarh	None	Mehar Ban Singh Rawat	Bharatiya Janata Party
Joura	None	Ummed Singh Bana	Indian National Congress
Sumawali	None	Gajraj Singh Sikarwar	Bharatiya Janata Party
Morena	None	Rustam Singh	Bharatiya Janata Party
Dimni	SC	Sandhya Ray	Bharatiya Janata Party
Ambah	SC	Bansilal Jatav	Bharatiya Janata Party
Gohad	SC	Lal Singh Arya	Bharatiya Janata Party
Mehgaon	None	Munna Singh	Independent
Attair	None	Satyadev Katare	Indian National Congress
Bhind	None	Narendra Singh Kushwah	Bharatiya Janata Party
Ron	None	Rasal Singh	Bharatiya Janata Party
Lahar	None	Dr. Govind Singh	Indian National Congress
Gwalior	None	Narendra Singh Tomar	Bharatiya Janata Party
Lashkar East	None	Anoop Mishra	Bharatiya Janata Party
Lashkar West	None	Narayan Singh Kushwah	Bharatiya Janata Party
Morar	None	Dhyanendra Singh	Bharatiya Janata Party
Gird	None	Brajendra Tiwari	Bharatiya Janata Party
Dabra	None	Dr. Narottam Mishra	Bharatiya Janata Party
Bhander	SC	Dr. Kamlapat Arya	Bharatiya Janata Party
Seondha	SC	Ram Dayal Prabhakar	Bharatiya Janata Party
Datia	None	Ghan Shyam Singh	Indian National Congress
Karera	None	Lakhan Singh Baghel	Bahujan Samaj Party
Pohri	None	Harivallabh Shukla	Rashtriya Samanta Dal
Shivpuri	None	Yashodhara Raje Scindia	Bharatiya Janata Party
Pichhore	None	K.p.singh	Indian National Congress
Kolaras	SC	Om Prakash Khatik	Bharatiya Janata Party
Guna	None	Kanhaiyalal Rameshwar Agrawal	Bharatiya Janata Party
Chachaura	None	Shivnarayan Meena	Indian National Congress
Raghogarh	None	Digvijay Singh	Indian National Congress
Shadora	SC	Gopi Lal	Bharatiya Janata Party
Ashoknagar	None	Jagannath Singh Raghuwanshi Vakil	Bharatiya Janata Party
Mungaoli	None	Gopal Singh Chauhan	Indian National Congress
Bina	None	Sushila Rakesh Sirothiya	Bharatiya Janata Party
Khurai	SC	Dharmu Rai	Bharatiya Janata Party
Banda	None	Harnam Bhaiya	Bharatiya Janata Party
Naryaoli	SC	Narayan Prasad Kabeer Panthi	Bharatiya Janata Party
Sagar	None	Smt. Sudha Jain	Bharatiya Janata Party
Surkhi	None	Govind Singh Rajput	Indian National Congress
Rehli	None	Gopal Bhargav	Bharatiya Janata Party
Deori	None	Ratan Singh Silarpur	Bharatiya Janata Party
Niwari	None	Brijendra Singh Rathore	Indian National Congress
Jatara	None	Sunil Nayak	Bharatiya Janata Party
Khargapur	SC	Hari Shankar Khateek	Bharatiya Janata Party
Tikamgarh	None	Akhand Pratap Singh Yadav	Bharatiya Janata Party
Malehra	None	Uma Bharti	Bharatiya Janata Party
Bijawar	None	Jitendra	Bharatiya Janata Party
Chhatarpur	None	Vikram Singh Alias Nati Raja	Samajwadi Party
Maharajpur	SC	Ramdayal Ahirwar	Bharatiya Janata Party
Chandla	None	Bundela Vijay Bahadur Singh	Samajwadi Party
Nohata	None	Chandrabhan Singh ( Bhaiya )	Bharatiya Janata Party
Damoh	None	Jayant Malaiya	Bharatiya Janata Party
Patharia	SC	Sonabai Sevakram Ahirwar	Bharatiya Janata Party
Hatta	None	Ghangaram Patel	Bharatiya Janata Party
Panna	None	Kusum Singh	Bharatiya Janata Party
Amanganj	SC	Kashi Prasad Bagri	Bharatiya Janata Party
Pawai	None	Brajendra Pratap	Bharatiya Janata Party
Maihar	None	Narayan Tripathi`	Samajwadi Party
Nagod	None	Nagendra Singh	Bharatiya Janata Party
Raigaon	SC	Jugul Kishor	Bharatiya Janata Party
Chitrakoot	None	Prem Singh	Indian National Congress
Satna	None	Shankar Lal Tiwari	Bharatiya Janata Party
Rampur Baghelan	None	Harsh Singh	Rashtriya Samanta Dal
Amarpatan	None	Rajendra Kumar Singh	Indian National Congress
Rewa	None	Rajendra Shukla	Bharatiya Janata Party
Gurh	None	Nagendra Singh	Bharatiya Janata Party
Mangawan	None	Girish Gautam	Bharatiya Janata Party
Sirmaur	None	Ram Lakhan Sharma	Communist Party of India
Teonthar	None	Ramakant Tiwari	Bharatiya Janata Party
Deotalab	SC	Panchu Lal Prajapati	Bharatiya Janata Party
Mauganj	None	Dr. I.m.p. Verma	Bahujan Samaj Party
Churahat	None	Ajay Singh ( Rahul Bhaiya )	Indian National Congress
Sidhi	None	Indrajeet Kumar	Indian National Congress
Gopadbanas	None	Krishna Kumar Singh (bhawar Sahib)	Samajwadi Party
Dhauhani	ST	Chhatra Pati Singh	Bharatiya Janata Party
Deosar	ST	Jagannath Singh	Bharatiya Janata Party
Singrauli	SC	Banshmani Prasad Verma	Samajwadi Party
Beohari	None	Kunwar Lavkesh Singh	Bharatiya Janata Party
Umaria	None	Gyan Singh	Bharatiya Janata Party
Nowrozabad	ST	Meena Singh	Bharatiya Janata Party
Jaisinghnagar	ST	Jairam Singh Marko	Bharatiya Janata Party
Kotma	ST	Jay Singh Marabi	Bharatiya Janata Party
Anuppur	ST	Ramlal Rautel	Bharatiya Janata Party
Sohagpur	None	Chhote Lal Sarawagi ( Khuddi Bhaiya )	Bharatiya Janata Party
Pushparajgarh	ST	Sudama Singh	Bharatiya Janata Party
Baihar	ST	Bhagat Singh Netam	Bharatiya Janata Party
Lanji	None	Dileep Kumar / Bhaiyalal	Bharatiya Janata Party
Kirnapur	None	Pushpalata Likhiram Kavre	Indian National Congress
Waraseoni	None	Pradeep Amrit Lal Jaiswal (gudda)	Indian National Congress
Khairlanjee	None	Bodh Singh Bhagat	Bharatiya Janata Party
Katangi	None	K.d Deshmukh	Bharatiya Janata Party
Balaghat	None	Gauri Shankar Chaturbhuj Bisen	Bharatiya Janata Party
Paraswada	None	Darboosingh Uikey	Gondwana Ganatantra Party
Nainpur	ST	Dev Singh Saiyam	Bharatiya Janata Party
Mandla	ST	Shivraj Shah	Bharatiya Janata Party
Bichhia	ST	Pandit Singh Dhurwey	Bharatiya Janata Party
Bajag	ST	Om Prakash Dhurve	Bharatiya Janata Party
Dindori	ST	Dulichand Uraiti	Bharatiya Janata Party
Shahpura	ST	Dr.c.s Bhavedi ( Chain Singh )	Bharatiya Janata Party
Niwas	ST	Rampyare Kulaste	Bharatiya Janata Party
Bargi	ST	Anup Singh Maravi	Bharatiya Janata Party
Panagar	ST	Moti Kashyap	Bharatiya Janata Party
Jabalpur Cantonment	None	Ishwar Das Rohani	Bharatiya Janata Party
Jabalpur East	SC	Anchal Sonkar	Bharatiya Janata Party
Jabalpur Central	None	Sarad Jain ( Advocate )	Bharatiya Janata Party
Jabalpur West	None	Babbu Harendra Jeet Singh	Bharatiya Janata Party
Patan	None	Tha. Sobaran Singh " Babooji"	Indian National Congress
Majholi	None	Ajay Vishnoi	Bharatiya Janata Party
Sihora	None	Dilip Dubey (bade)	Bharatiya Janata Party
Bahoriband	None	Nishith Patel	Indian National Congress
Murwara	None	Alka Jain	Bharatiya Janata Party
Badwara	None	Saroj Bachchan Nayak	Janata Dal
Vijairaghogarh	None	Dhruv Pratap Singh (deepak Bhaiya)	Bharatiya Janata Party
Gadarwara	None	Govind Singh Patel	Bharatiya Janata Party
Bohani	None	Sanjay Sharma	Bharatiya Janata Party
Narsimhapur	None	Jalam Singh Patel ( Munna Bhaiya )	Bharatiya Janata Party
Gotegaon	SC	Hakamsingh Chadhar(mehra)	Bharatiya Janata Party
Lakhanadon	ST	Smt. Shashi Thakur	Bharatiya Janata Party
Ghansor	ST	Ram Gulam Uikey	Gondwana Ganatantra Party
Keolari	None	Harvansh Singh	Indian National Congress
Barghat	None	Dr. Dhal Singh Bisen	Bharatiya Janata Party
Seoni	None	Naresh Diwakar ( D. N.)	Bharatiya Janata Party
Jamai	ST	Ram Das Uikey	Bharatiya Janata Party
Chhindwara	None	Chodhri Chandrabhan Singh Kuber Singh	Bharatiya Janata Party
Parasia	SC	Tarachand Bawaria	Bharatiya Janata Party
Damua	ST	Jhanaklal Thakur	Bharatiya Janata Party
Amarwara	ST	Manmohan Shah Batti	Gondwana Ganatantra Party
Chaurai	None	Pdt. Ramesh Dubey	Bharatiya Janata Party
Sausar	None	Nana Bhau Mohod	Bharatiya Janata Party
Pandhurna	None	Marotrao Khawse	Bharatiya Janata Party
Piparia	None	Arjun Paliya	Samajwadi Party
Hoshangabad	None	Madhukar Harne	Bharatiya Janata Party
Itarsi	None	Girija Shankar Sharma	Bharatiya Janata Party
Seoni-malwa	None	Hajarilal Raghuwanshi S/o Nanhu Singh Banapura	Indian National Congress
Timarni	SC	Manohar Lal Hajari Lal Rathor (advocate)	Bharatiya Janata Party
Harda	None	Kamal Patel	Bharatiya Janata Party
Multai	None	Dr. Sunilam	Samajwadi Party
Masod	None	Sukhseo Panse	Indian National Congress
Bhainsdehi	ST	Mahendra Sing Keshar Sing Chouhan	Bharatiya Janata Party
Betul	None	Shiv Prasad Rathore	Bharatiya Janata Party
Ghora Dongri	ST	Sajjan Singh Uike	Bharatiya Janata Party
Amla	SC	Bele Sunita	Indian National Congress
Budhni	None	Rajendra Singh	Bharatiya Janata Party
Ichhawar	None	Karan Singh Verma	Bharatiya Janata Party
Ashta	SC	Raghunath Singh Malviya	Bharatiya Janata Party
Sehore	None	Ramesh Saxena	Bharatiya Janata Party
Govindpura	None	Babulal Gour	Bharatiya Janata Party
Bhopal South	None	Uma Shankar Gupta	Bharatiya Janata Party
Bhopal North	None	Arif Aqueel	Indian National Congress
Berasia	None	Bhaktpal Singh	Bharatiya Janata Party
Sanchi	SC	Dr. Gauri Shankar Shejwar	Bharatiya Janata Party
Udaipura	None	Ram Pal Singh	Bharatiya Janata Party
Bareli	None	Bhagwat Singh Patel	Bharatiya Janata Party
Bhojpur	None	Rajesh Patel S/o Madho Singh	Indian National Congress
Kurwai	SC	Shyamlal Panthi	Bharatiya Janata Party
Basoda	None	Hari Singh Raghuvanshi Haripur	Bharatiya Janata Party
Vidisha	None	Gurucharan Singh	Bharatiya Janata Party
Shamshabad	None	Raghavji	Bharatiya Janata Party
Sironj	None	Laxmikant Sharma	Bharatiya Janata Party
Biaora	None	Badrilal Yadav	Bharatiya Janata Party
Narsingarh	None	Mohan Sharma	Bharatiya Janata Party
Sarangpur	SC	Amar Singh Kothar	Bharatiya Janata Party
Rajgarh	None	Pandit Hari Charan Tiwari	Bharatiya Janata Party
Khilchipur	None	Priyavrat Singh	Indian National Congress
Shujalpur	None	Kunwar Phool Singh Mewara	Bharatiya Janata Party
Gulana	None	Giriraj Mandloi	Bharatiya Janata Party
Shajapur	None	Karada Hukum Singh	Indian National Congress
Agar	SC	Rekha Ratnakar	Bharatiya Janata Party
Susner	None	Phoolchand Vaidia	Bharatiya Janata Party
Tarana	SC	Tarachand Goyal	Bharatiya Janata Party
Mahidpur	None	Bahadur Singh	Bharatiya Janata Party
Khachrod	None	Dileep Singh Gurjar	Independent
Badnagar	None	Shantilal Dhabai	Bharatiya Janata Party
Ghatiya	SC	Dr. Narayan Parmar	Bharatiya Janata Party
Ujjain North	None	Paras Jain	Bharatiya Janata Party
Ujjain South	None	Shivnarayan Jagirdar	Bharatiya Janata Party
Depalpur	None	Manoj Nirbhay Singh Patel	Bharatiya Janata Party
Mhow	None	Antar Singh Darbar	Indian National Congress
Indore-i	None	Miss Usha Thakur	Bharatiya Janata Party
Indore-ii	None	Kailash Vijayvargiya	Bharatiya Janata Party
Indore-iii	None	Ashwin Joshi	Indian National Congress
Indore-iv	None	Laxman Singh Gaur	Bharatiya Janata Party
Indore-v	None	Mahendra Hordiya	Bharatiya Janata Party
Sawer	SC	Prakash Sonkar	Bharatiya Janata Party
Dewas	None	Tukoji Rao Puar	Bharatiya Janata Party
Sonkatch	SC	Sajjan Singh Verma	Indian National Congress
Hatpipliya	None	Rajendrasingh Baghel	Indian National Congress
Bagli	None	Deepak Kailash Joshi	Bharatiya Janata Party
Khategaon	None	Brij Mohan Das Dhoot	Bharatiya Janata Party
Harsud	ST	Kunwar Vijay Shah	Bharatiya Janata Party
Nimarkhedi	None	Rajnarayan Singh Purin	Indian National Congress
Pandhana	SC	Kishorilal Varma	Bharatiya Janata Party
Khandwa	None	Hukumchand Yadav	Bharatiya Janata Party
Nepanagar	None	Archana Didi	Bharatiya Janata Party
Shahpur	None	Ravindra Suka Mahajan	Indian National Congress
Burhanpur	None	Hamid Kaji	Nationalist Congress Party
Bhikangaon	ST	Dhulsingh	Bharatiya Janata Party
Barwaha	None	Hitendra Singh Dhyan Singh Solanki	Bharatiya Janata Party
Maheshwar	SC	Bhupendra Arya	Bharatiya Janata Party
Kasrawad	None	Subhash Yadav	Indian National Congress
Khargone	None	Babulal Mahajan	Bharatiya Janata Party
Dhulkot	ST	Dalsingh Ramsingh Solanki	Bharatiya Janata Party
Sendhwa	ST	Antarsingh Arya	Bharatiya Janata Party
Anjad	ST	Devisingh Patel	Bharatiya Janata Party
Rajpur	ST	Diwansingh Patel	Bharatiya Janata Party
Barwani	ST	Premsingh Patel	Bharatiya Janata Party
Manawar	ST	Ranjana Baghel	Bharatiya Janata Party
Dharampuri	ST	Jagdish Muwel	Bharatiya Janata Party
Dhar	None	Jaswant Singh Rathore (advocate)	Bharatiya Janata Party
Badnawar	None	Rajvardhan Singh Dattigaon	Indian National Congress
Sardarpur	ST	Mukam Singh Nigwal	Bharatiya Janata Party
Kukshi	ST	Jamuna Devi	Indian National Congress
Alirajpur	ST	Nagar Singh Chouhan	Bharatiya Janata Party
Jobat	ST	Madho Singh	Bharatiya Janata Party
Jhabua	ST	Pave Singh Pargi	Bharatiya Janata Party
Petlawad	ST	Nirmala Bhuria	Bharatiya Janata Party
Thandla	ST	Kal Singh	Bharatiya Janata Party
Ratlam Town	None	Himmat Kothari	Bharatiya Janata Party
Ratlam Rural	None	Dhul Ji Choudhari	Bharatiya Janata Party
Sailana	ST	Prabhu Dayal Gehlot	Indian National Congress
Jaora	None	Dr. Rajendra Pandey	Bharatiya Janata Party
Alot	SC	Premchand Guddu	Indian National Congress
Manasa	None	Kailash Chawala	Bharatiya Janata Party
Garoth	None	Rajesh Yadav	Bharatiya Janata Party
Suwasara	SC	Jagdish Dewda	Bharatiya Janata Party
Sitamau	None	Nanalal Patidar	Bharatiya Janata Party
Mandsaur	None	Om Prakash Purohit ( Advocate )	Bharatiya Janata Party
Neemuch	None	Dilip Singh Parihar	Bharatiya Janata Party
Jawad	None	Omprakash Virendra Kumar Sakhalecha	Bharatiya Janata Party
