= Deepak Joshi =

Indian politician

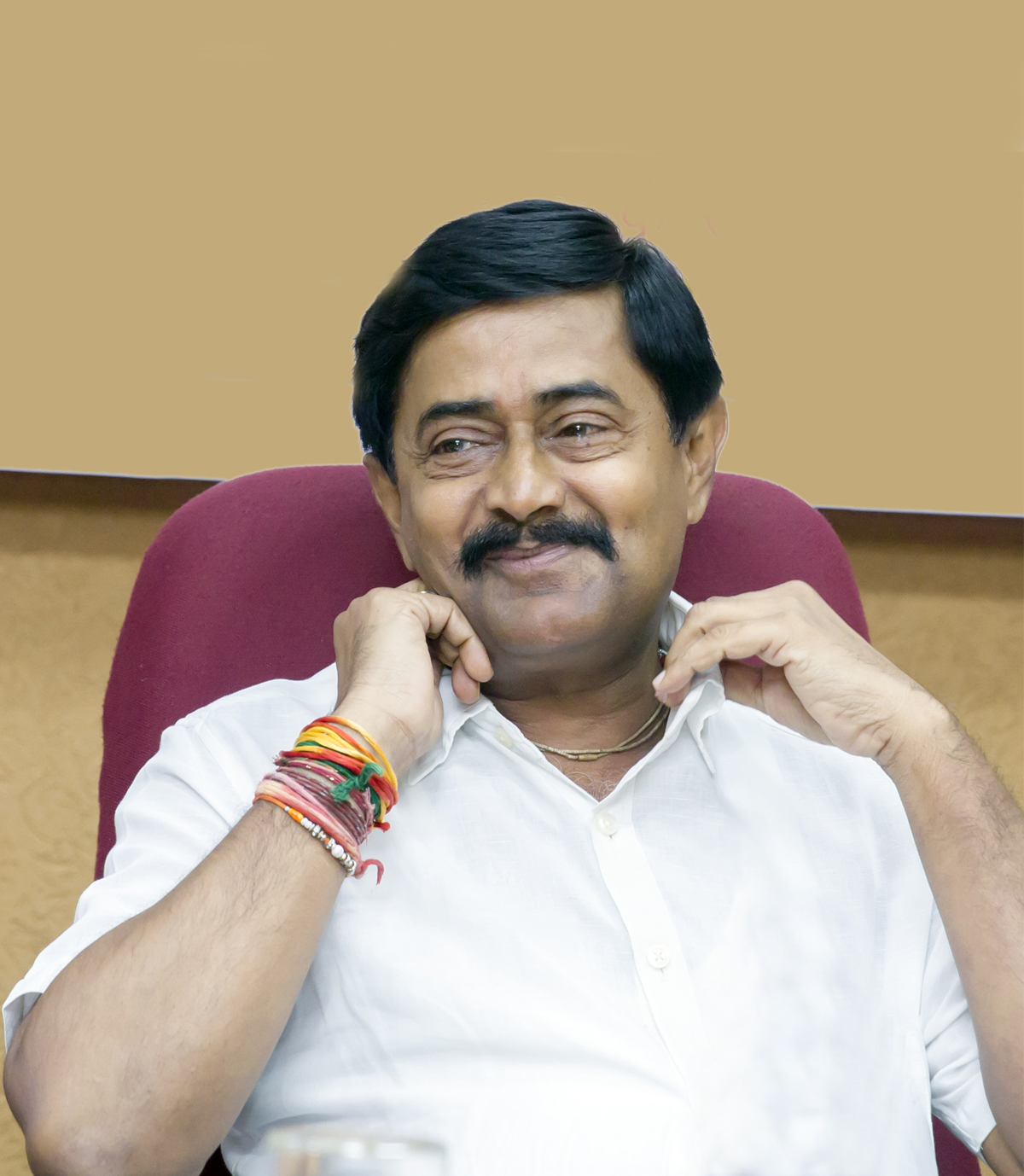

Member of the Madhya Pradesh Legislative Assembly
- In office 2008–2018
- Preceded by: Rajendrasingh Baghel
- Succeeded by: Manoj Choudhary
- Constituency: Hatpipliya
- In office 2003–2008
- Preceded by: Shyam Holani
- Succeeded by: Champalal Devda
- Constituency: Bagli

Personal details
- Born: 13 June 1962 (age 63) Hatpipliya, Madhya Pradesh, India
- Party: Indian National Congress
- Other political affiliations: Bharatiya Janata Party
- Parent: Kailash Chandra Joshi (father)
- Profession: Politician
- Source: [Department Of Public Relations, M.P.]

Deepak Joshi is an Indian politician. He was elected to the Madhya Pradesh Legislative Assembly from Bagli for one term (2003–2008). He then represented the Hatpipliya Assembly constituency for two terms as its MLA from 2008 to 2018. During his last term, he served as Minister of Technical Education and Skills Development, and of School Education for Madhya Pradesh.

In May 2023, he joined the Indian National Congress.

== Family ==
He is the son of Kailash Chandra Joshi, who served as the 9th Chief Minister of Madhya Pradesh in 1970s.

== Electoral record ==
Election	Constituency	Result
2003	Bagli	Won
2008	Hatpipliya	Won
2013	Hatpipliya	Won
2018	Hatpipliya	Lost

Madhya Pradesh Legislative Assembly
Preceded by Shyam Holani	Member of Vidhan Sabha for Bagli; 2003–2008	Succeeded by Champalal Devda
Preceded by Rajendrasingh Baghel	Member of Vidhan Sabha from the Hatpipliya Assembly constituency 2008–2018	Succeeded by Manoj Choudhary
