= Murli Bhawara =

Indian politician

Member of the Madhya Pradesh Legislative Assembly
- Incumbent
- Assumed office 2023
- Preceded by: Pahad Singh Kannoje
- Constituency: Bagli

Personal details
- Political party: Bharatiya Janata Party
- Profession: Politician

Murli Bhawara is an Indian politician from Madhya Pradesh. He is a member of the Madhya Pradesh Legislative Assembly from 2023, representing Bagli Assembly constituency as a Member of the Bharatiya Janata Party.

== See also ==
- List of chief ministers of Madhya Pradesh
- Madhya Pradesh Legislative Assembly
