= 1990 Madhya Pradesh Legislative Assembly election =

Indian state election

- 27 February 1990

All 320 assembly constituencies 161 seats needed for a majority
- Registered: 37,605,101
- Turnout: 54.19%
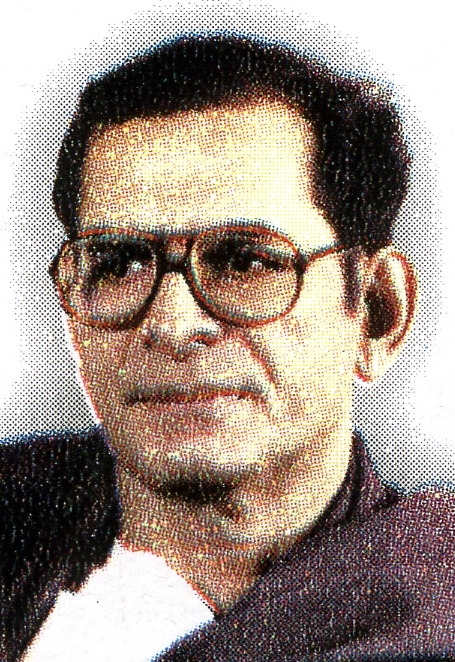
	Majority party	Minority party
	BJP
Leader	Sunderlal Patwa	Shyama Charan Shukla
Party	BJP	INC
Leader since	1980	1969
Last election	58	250
Seats won	220	56
Seat change	▲162	▼194
Popular vote	77,79,942	66,34,518
Percentage	39.14%	33.38%
Chief Minister before election
Shyama Charan Shukla
INC
Elected Chief Minister
Sunderlal Patwa
BJP

Elections to the Madhya Pradesh Legislative Assembly were held in February 1990. The Bharatiya Janata Party won a majority of seats and Sunderlal Patwa was sworn in as the new Chief Minister.

== Result ==
SN	Party	Seats Contested	Seats won	Seats Changed	% Votes
1	Bharatiya Janata Party	269	220	+162	39.14%
2	Indian National Congress	318	56	-194	33.38%
3	Janata Dal	115	28	N/A	7.71%
4	Communist Party of India	183	3	N/A	1.25%
5	Bahujan Samaj Party	63	2	N/A	3.54%
6	Krantikari Samajwadi Manch	20	1		0.40%
7	Independents	320	10	+4	12.31%
	Total		320		

== Elected members ==
Constituency	Reserved for	Member	Party
Sheopur	None	Gulab Singh	Bharatiya Janata Party
Vijaypur	None	Ram Niwas	Indian National Congress
Sabalgarh	None	Meharwan Singh Rawat	Bharatiya Janata Party
Joura	None	Subedar Singh	Janata Dal
Sumawali	None	Gajraj Singh	Janata Dal
Morena	None	Sevaram	Bharatiya Janata Party
Dimni	SC	Munshi Lal	Bharatiya Janata Party
Ambah	SC	Kishora	Janata Dal
Gohad	SC	Sriram	Bharatiya Janata Party
Mehgaon	None	Hari Singh	Indian National Congress
Ater	None	Munna Singh Bhadoria	Bharatiya Janata Party
Bhind	None	Rakesh Singh	Indian National Congress
Roun	None	Rejendra Prakash Singh	Bharatiya Janata Party
Lahar	None	Govind Singh	Janata Dal
Gwalior	None	Dharam Veer	Bharatiya Janata Party
Lashkar East	None	Raghunath Shankar Bhau Sahib Potnis	Bharatiya Janata Party
Lashkar West	None	Shitla Sahai	Bharatiya Janata Party
Morar	None	Dhayanendra Singh	Bharatiya Janata Party
Gird	None	Anoop Mishra	Bharatiya Janata Party
Dabra	None	Narottam Mishra	Bharatiya Janata Party
Bhander	SC	Pooram Singh Palaiya	Bharatiya Janata Party
Seondha	SC	Mahendra Boudha	Indian National Congress
Datia	None	Shambhu Tiwari	Bharatiya Janata Party
Karera	None	Bhagwat Singh Yadav	Bharatiya Janata Party
Pohri	None	Jadish Prasad Verma	Bharatiya Janata Party
Shivpuri	None	Sushil Bahadur Asthana	Independent
Pichhore	None	Laxmi Narayan Gupta	Bharatiya Janata Party
Kolaras	SC	Om Prakash Khatik	Bharatiya Janata Party
Guna	None	Bhag Chandra Sogani	Bharatiya Janata Party
Chachoda	None	Ram Bahadur Singh Parihar	Bharatiya Janata Party
Raghogarh	None	Laxman Singh	Indian National Congress
Shadora	SC	Gopilal	Bharatiya Janata Party
Ashoknagar	None	Neelam Singh Yadav	Bharatiya Janata Party
Mungaoli	None	Deshraj Singh	Bharatiya Janata Party
Bina	None	Sudhakar Bapat	Bharatiya Janata Party
Khurai	SC	Dharmu Rai	Bharatiya Janata Party
Banda	None	Harnam Singh Rathore	Bharatiya Janata Party
Naryaoli	SC	Narayan Prasad Kabirpanthi	Bharatiya Janata Party
Sagar	None	Prakash Motilal Jain	Indian National Congress
Surkhi	None	Laxmi Narayan Yadav	Janata Dal
Rehli	None	Gopal Bhargava	Bharatiya Janata Party
Deori	None	Parshu Ram Sahu	Bharatiya Janata Party
Niwari	None	Ahir Vikram Singh	Janata Dal
Jatara	None	Kunwar Surendra Pratap Singh	Bharatiya Janata Party
Khargpur	SC	Anandi Lal	Bharatiya Janata Party
Tikamgarh	None	Goyal Magan Lal	Bharatiya Janata Party
Malehra	None	Ashok Kumar	Bharatiya Janata Party
Bijawar	None	Juhjar Singh	Bharatiya Janata Party
Chhatarpur	None	Jagdamba Prasad Nigam	Janata Dal
Maharajpur	SC	Ahirwar Ramdayal	Bharatiya Janata Party
Chandla	None	Ansari Mohd. Gani	Bharatiya Janata Party
Nohata	None	Om Prakash Rai	Bharatiya Janata Party
Damoh	None	Jayant Malaiya	Bharatiya Janata Party
Patharia	SC	Mani Shankar	Bharatiya Janata Party
Hatta	None	Ram Krishna Kashmaria	Bharatiya Janata Party
Panna	None	Kusum Singh Mahdele	Bharatiya Janata Party
Amanganj	SC	Ganeshi Lal	Bharatiya Janata Party
Pawai	None	Ashok Bir Vikarm Singh	Independent
Maihar	None	Narayan Singh	Janata Dal
Nagod	None	Ram Pratap Singh	Indian National Congress
Raigaon	SC	Dhirendra Singh	Janata Dal
Chitrakoot	None	Rama Nand Singh	Janata Dal
Satna	None	Vrijendra Pathak	Bharatiya Janata Party
Rampur Baghelan	None	Toshan Singh	Janata Dal
Amarpatan	None	Ram Hit	Bharatiya Janata Party
Rewa	None	Pushpraj Singh (rewa)	Indian National Congress
Gurh	None	Vishambhar Nath Pandey	Communist Party of India
Mangawan	None	Sriniwas Tiwari	Indian National Congress
Sirmour	None	Ram Lakhan Sharma	Janata Dal
Teonthar	None	Ramakant Tiwari	Indian National Congress
Deotalab	SC	Jai Karan Saket	Bahujan Samaj Party
Mauganj	None	Udai Prakash Mishra	Indian National Congress
Churahat	None	Arjun Singh	Indian National Congress
Sidhi	None	Indrajeet Kumar	Indian National Congress
Gopadbanas	None	Kamleshwar Prasad Dwivedi	Indian National Congress
Dhahani	ST	Tilakraj Singh	Bharatiya Janata Party
Deosar	ST	Amar Singh	Bharatiya Janata Party
Singrauli	SC	Ram Charitra	Bharatiya Janata Party
Beohari	None	Lavkesh Singh	Bharatiya Janata Party
Umaria	None	Virender Kumar Chandel	Janata Dal
Nowrozabad	ST	Gyan Singh	Bharatiya Janata Party
Jaisinghnagar	ST	Ram Nath Singh	Janata Dal
Kotma	ST	Chhote Lal	Bharatiya Janata Party
Anuppur	ST	Laxmi Bai Aarmo	Bharatiya Janata Party
Sohagpur	None	Krishan Pal Singh	Indian National Congress
Pushparajgarh	ST	Kundan Singh	Janata Dal
Manendragarh	ST	Chandra Pratap	Bharatiya Janata Party
Baikunthpur	None	Ram Chandra	Indian National Congress
Premnagar	ST	Khelsai Singh	Indian National Congress
Surajpur	ST	Seho Pratap Singh	Bharatiya Janata Party
Pal	ST	Ram Vichar	Bharatiya Janata Party
Samri	ST	Amin Sai	Bharatiya Janata Party
Lundra	ST	Ram Kishun	Bharatiya Janata Party
Pilkha	ST	Murarilal	Bharatiya Janata Party
Ambikapur	ST	Madan Gopal	Indian National Congress
Sitapur	ST	Ram Khelawan	Independent
Bagicha	ST	Vikram Bhagat	Bharatiya Janata Party
Jashpur	ST	Ganesh Ram Bhagat	Bharatiya Janata Party
Tapkara	ST	Vishnu Sai	Bharatiya Janata Party
Pathalgaon	ST	Laljit Singh	Bharatiya Janata Party
Dharamjaigarh	ST	Chanesh Ram	Indian National Congress
Lailunga	ST	Prem Singh Sidar	Bharatiya Janata Party
Raigarh	None	Krishna Kumar	Indian National Congress
Kharsia	None	Nandkumar Patel	Indian National Congress
Saria	None	Shakrajit Naik	Bharatiya Janata Party
Sarangarh	SC	Bhaiya Ram Khunte	Indian National Congress
Rampur	ST	Nankiram Kawer	Bharatiya Janata Party
Katghora	None	Krishnalal Jaiswal	Indian National Congress
Tanakhar	ST	Amol Singh Salam	Bharatiya Janata Party
Marwahi	ST	Bhanwar Singh Porte	Bharatiya Janata Party
Kota	None	Rajendra Prasad Shukla	Indian National Congress
Lormi	None	Niranjan Kesharvani	Bharatiya Janata Party
Mungeli	SC	Khem Singh Barmate	Bharatiya Janata Party
Jarhagaon	SC	Punnulal Mohale	Bharatiya Janata Party
Takhatpur	None	Manharanlal Pandey	Bharatiya Janata Party
Bilaspur	None	Moolchand Khandelwal	Bharatiya Janata Party
Bilha	None	Ashok Rao	Janata Dal
Masturi	SC	Madan Singh	Bharatiya Janata Party
Sipat	None	Baridhar Diwan	Bharatiya Janata Party
Akaltara	None	Jawahar Dubey	Independent
Paingarh	None	Dauram	Bahujan Samaj Party
Champa	None	Baliharb Singh	Bharatiya Janata Party
Sakti	None	Pushpendra Bahadur Singh	Bharatiya Janata Party
Malkharoda	SC	Shyam Lal	Bharatiya Janata Party
Chandrapur	None	Dushyant Kumar Singh Judev	Bharatiya Janata Party
Raipur Town	None	Brijmohan Agarwal	Bharatiya Janata Party
Raipur Rural	None	Tarun Chaterji	Janata Dal
Abhanpur	None	Chandrashekhar Sahu	Bharatiya Janata Party
Mandirhasaod	None	Satya Narayan Sharam	Indian National Congress
Arang	SC	Gangooram Baghel	Bharatiya Janata Party
Dharsinwa	None	Agrawal Shyam Sundar	Bharatiya Janata Party
Bhatapara	None	Shyamachanran Shukla	Indian National Congress
Baloda Bazar	None	Satyanarayan Kesharwani	Bharatiya Janata Party
Pallari	SC	P.r. Khute	Bharatiya Janata Party
Kasdol	None	Aruna Kumar	Janata Dal
Bhatgaon	SC	Haridas Bhardwaj	Bharatiya Janata Party
Saraipali	None	Narasingh Pradhan	Bharatiya Janata Party
Basna	None	Laxman Jaydev Satpathi	Janata Dal
Khallari	None	Ramesh	Janata Dal
Mahasamund	None	Santosh Kumar	Janata Dal
Rajim	None	Shyama Charan Shukla	Indian National Congress
Bindranawagarh	ST	Balram Pujari	Bharatiya Janata Party
Siwaha	ST	Madhav Singh Dhruw	Indian National Congress
Kurud	None	Somprakash Giri	Bharatiya Janata Party
Dhamtari	None	Kriparam Hiralal Sahu	Bharatiya Janata Party
Bhanupratappur	ST	Jhaduram Rawate	Independent
Kanker	ST	Aghan Singh Bhaw Singh Thakur	Bharatiya Janata Party
Keshkal	ST	Krishna Kumar Dhruw	Bharatiya Janata Party
Kondagaon	ST	Mangal Ram Usendi	Bharatiya Janata Party
Bhanpuri	ST	Bali Ram Mahadeo Kashyap	Bharatiya Janata Party
Jagdalpur	ST	Dinesh Kumar Bali Ram Kashyap	Bharatiya Janata Party
Keshloor	ST	Sampat Singh Bhandari	Bharatiya Janata Party
Chitrakote	ST	Dhani Ram Pujari	Bharatiya Janata Party
Dantewara	ST	Barsa Dularam	Communist Party of India
Konta	ST	Manish Kumar	Communist Party of India
Bijapur	ST	Rajendra Pambhoi	Indian National Congress
Narayanpur	ST	Shambhu Nath Naik	Bharatiya Janata Party
Maro	SC	Derhoo Prasad Ghritlahre	Independent
Bemetara	None	Mahesh Tiwari	Janata Dal
Saja	None	Ravindra Choubey	Indian National Congress
Dhamdha	None	Jageshwar Sahu	Indian National Congress
Durg	None	Moti Lal Vora	Indian National Congress
Bhilai	None	Prem Prakash Pandey	Bharatiya Janata Party
Patan	None	Kailash Chandra Sharma	Bharatiya Janata Party
Gunderdehi	None	Tara Chand Sahu	Bharatiya Janata Party
Khertha	None	Pyare Lal Belchandan	Indian National Congress
Balod	None	Jalam Singh Patel	Indian National Congress
Dondi Lohara	ST	Jhumuklal Bhendiya	Indian National Congress
Chowki	ST	Suresh Thakur	Bharatiya Janata Party
Khujji	None	Jagannath Yadav	Janata Dal
Dongargaon	None	Geeta Devi Singh	Indian National Congress
Rajnandgaon	None	Lilaram Bhojwani	Bharatiya Janata Party
Dongargarh	SC	Dhanesh Patila	Indian National Congress
Khairagarh	None	Rashmi Devi Singh	Indian National Congress
Birendranagar	None	Darbar Singh	Janata Dal
Kawardha	None	Raman Singh	Bharatiya Janata Party
Baihar	ST	Sudhanva Singh Netam	Bharatiya Janata Party
Lanji	None	Dilip Bhatere Bhaiya Lal	Independent
Kirnapur	None	Likhiram Kaware	Indian National Congress
Waraseoni	None	K.d. Deshmukh	Janata Dal
Khairlanjee	None	Vishaveshwar Bhagat	Indian National Congress
Katangi	None	Lochan Lal Narayan Thakre	Bharatiya Janata Party
Balaghat	None	Gauri Shankar Bisen	Bharatiya Janata Party
Paraswada	None	Uma Shankar Munjare	Krantikari Samajwadi Manch
Nainpur	ST	Balram Singh Tilgam	Bharatiya Janata Party
Mandla	ST	Chhote Lal Uikey	Indian National Congress
Bichhia	ST	Roop Singh	Bharatiya Janata Party
Bajag	ST	Om Prakash	Bharatiya Janata Party
Dindori	ST	Jehar Singh	Bharatiya Janata Party
Shahpura	ST	Ram Singh	Bharatiya Janata Party
Niwas	ST	Faggan Singh Kuleste	Bharatiya Janata Party
Bargi	ST	Anoop Singh Maravi	Bharatiya Janata Party
Panagar	ST	Moti Lal	Bharatiya Janata Party
Jabalpur Cantonment	None	Chandra Mohan	Indian National Congress
Jabalpur East	SC	Mangal Parag	Janata Dal
Jabalpur Central	None	Onkur Prasad	Bharatiya Janata Party
Jabalpur West	None	Jaishri Banerjee	Bharatiya Janata Party
Patan	None	Kalyani Pandey	Indian National Congress
Majholi	None	Ram Prakash	Bharatiya Janata Party
Sihora	None	Prabhat Kumar	Bharatiya Janata Party
Bahoriband	None	Rani Dubey	Bharatiya Janata Party
Murwara	None	Ram Rani Johar	Indian National Congress
Badwara	None	N.v. Raman	Indian National Congress
Vijairaghogarh	None	Lal Rajendra Singh Baghet	Bharatiya Janata Party
Gadarwara	None	Naresh Kumar Pathak	Bharatiya Janata Party
Bohani	None	Sujan Singh Patel	Bharatiya Janata Party
Narsimhapur	None	Uttam Chand Lunawat	Bharatiya Janata Party
Gotegaon	SC	Anchal Bhai	Bharatiya Janata Party
Lakhanadon	ST	Randhir Singh	Indian National Congress
Ghansor	ST	Thakur Dal Singh	Bharatiya Janata Party
Keolari	None	Neha Singh	Bharatiya Janata Party
Barghat	None	Dhal Singh Bisen	Bharatiya Janata Party
Seoni	None	Mahesh Prasad Shukla	Bharatiya Janata Party
Jamai	ST	Ram Chandra Parteti	Bharatiya Janata Party
Chhindwara	None	Choudhari Chandra Bhan Singh Kuber Singh	Bharatiya Janata Party
Parasia	SC	Ramji Mastkar	Bharatiya Janata Party
Damua	ST	Kamla Wadiva	Bharatiya Janata Party
Amarwara	ST	Mehman Shah Uikey	Bharatiya Janata Party
Chaurai	None	Ramesh Dube	Bharatiya Janata Party
Sausar	None	Ramrao Mahale	Bharatiya Janata Party
Pandhurna	None	Maroti Rao Khabse	Bharatiya Janata Party
Piparia	None	Murli Dhar Maheshwari	Bharatiya Janata Party
Hoshangabad	None	Madhukar Harne	Bharatiya Janata Party
Itarsi	None	Sita Saran Sharma	Bharatiya Janata Party
Seoni-malwa	None	Prem Shanker Verma	Bharatiya Janata Party
Timarni	SC	Manohar Lal Rathor	Bharatiya Janata Party
Harda	None	Badri Narain Agarwal	Bharatiya Janata Party
Multai	None	Mani Ram Barange	Bharatiya Janata Party
Masod	None	Vasudeo Thakre	Bharatiya Janata Party
Bhainsdehi	ST	Keshar Singh Dadoo Singh Chauhan	Bharatiya Janata Party
Betul	None	Bhagwat Patel	Bharatiya Janata Party
Ghora Dongri	ST	Ramji Lal Uike	Bharatiya Janata Party
Amla	SC	Kanhaiya Lal Dhole Ker	Bharatiya Janata Party
Budhni	None	Shivraj Singh Chauhan	Bharatiya Janata Party
Ichhawar	None	Karan Singh Verma	Bharatiya Janata Party
Ashta	SC	Nand Kishor Khatri	Bharatiya Janata Party
Sehore	None	Madan Lal Tyagi	Bharatiya Janata Party
Govindpura	None	Babul Lal Gaur	Bharatiya Janata Party
Bhopal South	None	Shelender	Bharatiya Janata Party
Bhopal North	None	Aarif Akil	Independent
Berasia	None	Laxmi Narain Sharma	Bharatiya Janata Party
Sanchi	SC	Gauri Shankar Shejwar	Bharatiya Janata Party
Udaipura	None	Ram Pal Singh	Bharatiya Janata Party
Bareli	None	Bhagawat Singh Patel	Bharatiya Janata Party
Bhojpur	None	Sundar Lal Patwa	Bharatiya Janata Party
Kurwai	SC	Shyam Lal	Bharatiya Janata Party
Basoda	None	Ajaya Singh Raghuvansi	Bharatiya Janata Party
Vidisha	None	Mohar Singh Thakur	Bharatiya Janata Party
Shamshabad	None	Prem Narayan	Bharatiya Janata Party
Sironj	None	Bhavani Singh	Bharatiya Janata Party
Biaora	None	Dattatray Rao	Independent
Narsingarh	None	Hanuman Prasad Garg	Bharatiya Janata Party
Sarangpur	SC	Amar Singh	Bharatiya Janata Party
Rajgarh	None	Raghunandan Sharma	Bharatiya Janata Party
Khilchipur	None	Poor Singh Pawar	Bharatiya Janata Party
Shujalpur	None	Nemi Chand Jain	Bharatiya Janata Party
Gulana	None	Vijender Singh Sisodiya	Bharatiya Janata Party
Shajapur	None	Laxmi Narain Patel	Bharatiya Janata Party
Agar	SC	Narain Singh Keshari	Bharatiya Janata Party
Susner	None	Badri Lal Soni	Bharatiya Janata Party
Tarana	SC	Govind Parmar	Bharatiya Janata Party
Mahidpur	None	Babu Lal Jain	Bharatiya Janata Party
Khachrod	None	Lal Singh	Bharatiya Janata Party
Badnagar	None	Uday Singh Panday	Bharatiya Janata Party
Ghatiya	SC	Rameshwar Akhand	Bharatiya Janata Party
Ujjain North	None	Paras Chandra Jain	Bharatiya Janata Party
Ujjain South	None	Babu Lal Mahere	Bharatiya Janata Party
Depalpur	None	Nirbhaya Singh Patel	Bharatiya Janata Party
Mhow	None	Bhairu Lal	Bharatiya Janata Party
Indore-i	None	Lalit Jain	Independent
Indore-ii	None	Suresh Seth	Indian National Congress
Indore-iii	None	Gopi Krishan Nema	Bharatiya Janata Party
Indore-iv	None	Kailash Vijayvargiya	Bharatiya Janata Party
Indore-v	None	Ashok Shukla	Indian National Congress
Sanwar	SC	Prakash Sonkar	Bharatiya Janata Party
Dewas	None	Youvraj Tukoji Rao	Bharatiya Janata Party
Sonkatch	SC	Kailash	Bharatiya Janata Party
Hatpipliya	None	Tejsingh Sendhav	Bharatiya Janata Party
Bagli	None	Kailash Joshi	Bharatiya Janata Party
Khategaon	None	Govind	Bharatiya Janata Party
Harsud	ST	Kunwar Vijay Shah	Bharatiya Janata Party
Nimarkhedi	None	Raghuraj Singh	Bharatiya Janata Party
Pandhana	SC	Kishori Lal Verma	Bharatiya Janata Party
Khandwa	None	Hukum Chand Yadav	Bharatiya Janata Party
Nepanagar	None	Briaj Mohan Mishra	Bharatiya Janata Party
Shahpur	None	Nand Kumar Singh Chouhan	Bharatiya Janata Party
Burhanpur	None	Shiv Kumar Singh Naval Singh	Janata Dal
Bhikangaon	ST	Dongar Singh	Bharatiya Janata Party
Barwaha	None	Chandrakant Gupta	Bharatiya Janata Party
Maheshwar	SC	Madan Verma	Bharatiya Janata Party
Kasrawad	None	Gajanand Jinwala	Bharatiya Janata Party
Khargone	None	Rai Singh Rathore	Bharatiya Janata Party
Dhulkot	ST	Mal Singh Latu	Bharatiya Janata Party
Sendhwa	ST	Antar Singh Raoji	Bharatiya Janata Party
Anjad	ST	Devi Singh Chhitu Patel	Bharatiya Janata Party
Rajpur	ST	Diwan Singh Vitthal	Bharatiya Janata Party
Barwani	ST	Umrao Singh Parvat Singh	Bharatiya Janata Party
Manawar	ST	Gajendra Singh Rajukhedi	Bharatiya Janata Party
Dharampuri	ST	Jhinga Lal Patel	Bharatiya Janata Party
Dhar	None	Vikram Verma	Bharatiya Janata Party
Badnawar	None	Prem Singh Daulat Singh	Indian National Congress
Sardarpur	ST	Ganpat Singh Patel	Indian National Congress
Kukshi	ST	Ranjana Baghel	Bharatiya Janata Party
Alirajpur	ST	Magan Singh	Indian National Congress
Jobat	ST	Ajmer Singh	Indian National Congress
Jhabua	ST	Bapu Singh	Indian National Congress
Petlawad	ST	Var Singh	Indian National Congress
Thandla	ST	Kantilal Bhuria	Indian National Congress
Ratlam Town	None	Himmat Kothari	Bharatiya Janata Party
Ratlam Rural	None	Moti Lal	Indian National Congress
Sailana	ST	Kamji Gamira	Janata Dal
Jaora	None	Patel Rugnath Singh Aanjana	Bharatiya Janata Party
Alot	SC	Thawar Chand Gehlot	Bharatiya Janata Party
Manasa	None	Radhe Shyam Ladha	Bharatiya Janata Party
Garoth	None	Radhe Shyam Mandliya	Bharatiya Janata Party
Suwasara	SC	Jagdish Devda	Bharatiya Janata Party
Sitamau	None	Nana Lal Patidar	Bharatiya Janata Party
Mandsaur	None	Kailash Chawla	Bharatiya Janata Party
Neemuch	None	Khuman Singh Shivaji	Bharatiya Janata Party
Jawad	None	Duli Chand	Bharatiya Janata Party
