= Hatpipliya Assembly constituency =

Constituency of the Madhya Pradesh legislative assembly

Coordinates: 22°48′0″N 76°24′0″E

Hatpipliya
- Constituency No. 172 for the Madhya Pradesh Legislative Assembly

Constituency details
- Country: India
- Region: Central India
- State: Madhya Pradesh
- District: Dewas
- Lok Sabha constituency: Dewas
- Established: 1977
- Total electors: 191,625
- Reservation: None

Member of Legislative Assembly
- 16th Madhya Pradesh Legislative Assembly
- Incumbent Manoj Choudhary
- Party: Bharatiya Janata Party
- Elected year: 2023
- Preceded by: Deepak Kailash Joshi

Hatpipliya is one of the 230 Vidhan Sabha (Legislative Assembly) constituencies of Madhya Pradesh state in central India. It was created in 1976 and is one of the 5 Vidhan Sabha constituencies located in Dewas District and one of the 8 constituencies within Dewas (Lok Sabha constituency). This constituency covers Hatpipliya tehsil and parts of Dewas tehsil, both in Dewas district.

Since December 2023, the Member of the Vidhan Sabha for Hatpipliya is Manoj Choudhary. His term is expected to last until December 2028.

== Birth and extent of the constituency ==
This constituency was carved out of parts of Bagli and Dewas by the Delimitation of Parliamentary and Assembly Constituencies Order, 1976. The first elections held here, as a separate constituency, were in 1977.

After the last delimitation in 2007, the constituency comprises the following segments:

1. Siya, Anandpur Dungria, Khatamba, Singawada, Bairagarh, Dewar, Lohari and Chandana Patwari Circles of Dewas, all within RI (Revenue Inspector) Circle of Dewas tehsil
2. Baotha RI Circle of Dewas tehsil
3. Hatpipliya-1 RI Circle of Hatpipliya tehsil
4. Hatpipliya town.

== Members of the Legislative Assembly ==
| Year | Member | Picture | Party |
|---|---|---|---|
| 1977 | Tejsingh Sendhav | | Janata Party |
| 1980 | Tejsingh Sendhav | | Bharatiya Janata Party |
| 1985 | Rajendrasingh Baghel | | Indian National Congress |
| 1990 | Tejsingh Sendhav | | Bharatiya Janata Party |
| 1993 | Rajendrasingh Baghel | | Indian National Congress |
| 1998 | Tejsingh Sendhav | | Bharatiya Janata Party |
| 2003 | Rajendrasingh Baghel | | Indian National Congress |
| 2008 | Deepak Kailash Joshi | | Bharatiya Janata Party |
| 2013 | Deepak Kailash Joshi | | Bharatiya Janata Party |
| 2018 | Manoj Choudhary | | Indian National Congress |
| 2020 (Note: by-poll) | Manoj Choudhary | | Bharatiya Janata Party |
| 2023 | Manoj Choudhary | | Bharatiya Janata Party |

== Election results ==
=== 2023 ===
2023 Madhya Pradesh Legislative Assembly election: Hatpipliya
| Party | Candidate | Votes | % | ±% |
|---|---|---|---|---|
| BJP | Manoj Choudhary | 89,842 | 49.89 | −2.62 |
| INC | Rajveer Singh Rajendra Singh Baghel | 85,700 | 47.59 | +3.73 |
| NOTA | None of the above | 1,059 | 0.59 | −0.17 |
| Majority | | 4,142 | 2.3 | −6.35 |
| Turnout | | 180,082 | 86.6 | +2.88 |
| BJP hold | | Swing | | |

=== 2020 bypoll ===
M. P. Legislative Assembly By-Election, 2020: Hatpipliya
| Party | Candidate | Votes | % | ±% |
|---|---|---|---|---|
| BJP | Manoj Choudhary | 84,405 | 52.51 | ▲0.36 |
| INC | Kunwar Rajvir Singh Rajendra Singh Baghel | 70,501 | 43.86 | |
| BSP | Rajesh Nagar | 1,896 | 1.18 | |
| NOTA | None of the above | 1,225 | 0.76 | ▼0.40 |
| Majority | | 13,904 | 8.65 | |
| Turnout | | 1,60,764 | 83.72 | |
| BJP gain from INC | | Swing | | |

=== 2018 ===
2018 Madhya Pradesh Legislative Assembly election: Hatpipliya
| Party | Candidate | Votes | % | ±% |
|---|---|---|---|---|
| INC | Manoj Choudhary | 83,337 | 52.15 | |
| BJP | Deepak Kailash Joshi | 69,818 | 43.69 | |
| BSP | Santosh- Khangode | 2,347 | 1.47 | |
| NOTA | None of the above | 1,847 | 1.16 | |
| Majority | | 13,519 | 8.46 | |
| Turnout | | 159,809 | 85.57 | |

=== 2013 ===
M. P. Legislative Assembly Election, 2013: Hatpipliya
| Party | Candidate | Votes | % | ±% |
|---|---|---|---|---|
| BJP | Deepak Kailash Joshi | 68,824 | 49.18 | ▲16.13 |
| INC | Rajendrasingh Baghel | 62649 | 44.77 | ▲11.93 |
| BSP | Mukesh Songara | 2748 | 1.96 | |
| None of the Above | Nota | 2131 | 1.52 | |
| Turnout | | | | |
| BJP hold | | Swing | | |

=== 2008 ===
M. P. Legislative Assembly Election, 2008: Hatpipliya
| Party | Candidate | Votes | % | ±% |
|---|---|---|---|---|
| BJP | Deepak Kailash Joshi | 35,405 | 33.05 | |
| INC | Rajendrasingh Baghel | 35185 | 32.84 | |
| Independent | Narayan Singh Choudhary | 21161 | 19.75 | |
| Independent | Ashok Patel (Captain) | 6011 | 5.61 | |
| BSP | Choudhary Vrandavan | 4731 | 4.42 | |
| Independent | Gyansingh | 2011 | 1.88 | |
| Turnout | | 107131 | 0.759 | |
| Swing to BJP from INC | | Swing | | |

=== 2003 ===
M. P. Legislative Assembly Election, 2003: Hatpipliya
| Party | Candidate | Votes | % | ±% |
|---|---|---|---|---|
| INC | Rajendrasingh Baghel | 49,546 | 46.59 | |
| BJP | Ku.Rai Singh Sendhav | 47492 | 44.66 | |
| BSP | Khati Vrandavan Chaudhry | 6082 | 5.72 | |
| Independent | Liladhar Choudhry | 1823 | 1.71 | |
| SP | Madhusudan Sharma | 1399 | 1.32 | |
| Turnout | | 106379 | 72.5 | |
| Swing to INC from BJP | | Swing | | |

=== 1998 ===
M. P. Legislative Assembly Election, 1998: Hatpipliya
| Party | Candidate | Votes | % | ±% |
|---|---|---|---|---|
| BJP | Tejsingh Sendhav | 45,653 | 52.25 | |
| INC | Rajendrasingh Baghel | 40191 | 46.00 | |
| BSP | Madanlal Solanki | 1299 | 1.49 | |
| Turnout | | 88839 | 70.94 | |
| Swing to BJP from INC | | Swing | | |

=== 1993 ===
M. P. Legislative Assembly Election, 1993: Hatpipliya
| Party | Candidate | Votes | % | ±% |
|---|---|---|---|---|
| INC | Rajendrasingh Baghel | 39,837 | 50.17 | |
| BJP | Tejsingh Sendhav | 38666 | 48.7 | |
| Turnout | | 81877 | 71.97 | |
| Swing to INC from BJP | | Swing | | |

=== 1990 ===
M. P. Legislative Assembly Election, 1990: Hatpipliya
| Party | Candidate | Votes | % | ±% |
|---|---|---|---|---|
| BJP | Tejsingh Sendhav | 40,973 | 55.85 | |
| INC | Rajendrasingh Baghel | 29697 | 40.48 | |
| Doordarshi Party | Dilip Singh Dhakar, Jetpura | 1679 | 2.29 | |
| BSP | Rama Kant | 751 | 1.02 | |
| Turnout | | 75236 | 69.36 | |
| Swing to BJP from INC | | Swing | | |

=== 1985 ===
M. P. Legislative Assembly Election, 1985: Hatpipliya
| Party | Candidate | Votes | % | ±% |
|---|---|---|---|---|
| INC | Rajendrasingh Baghel | 30,729 | 51.69 | |
| BJP | Tejsingh Sendhav | 26010 | 43.75 | |
| Independent | Dilip | 1871 | 3.15 | |
| JP | Ranchhod Patel | 839 | 1.41 | |
| Turnout | | 60892 | 70.87 | |
| Swing to INC from BJP | | Swing | | |

=== 1980 ===
M. P. Legislative Assembly Election, 1980: Hatpipliya
| Party | Candidate | Votes | % | ±% |
|---|---|---|---|---|
| BJP | Tejsingh Sendhav | 26,366 | 52.01 | |
| INC(I) | Jagdipendarsingh Holkar | 19193 | 37.86 | |
| Independent | Purshottam Mangilal Mantri | 1667 | 3.29 | |
| Independent | Ramnaresh Verma | 1076 | 2.12 | |
| JP(S) | Sardar Diwan Singh Ladda Singh | 1007 | 1.99 | |
| JP | Nagjiram Sathi | 986 | 1.94 | |
| Turnout | | 50697 | | |
| Swing to BJP from JP | | Swing | | |

=== 1977 ===
M. P. Legislative Assembly Election, 1977: Hatpipliya
| Party | Candidate | Votes | % | ±% |
|---|---|---|---|---|
| JP | Tejsingh Sendhav | 28,898 | 66.67 | |
| INC | Debisingh Chittrejee | 14445 | 33.33 | |
| Turnout | | 45107 | 68.43 | |

== See also ==
- List of constituencies of the Madhya Pradesh Legislative Assembly
- Dewas district
