= 1977 Madhya Pradesh Legislative Assembly election =

Indian state election

- 6 October 1977

All 320 assembly constituencies 161 seats needed for a majority
- Registered: 22,973,962
- Turnout: 52.73%
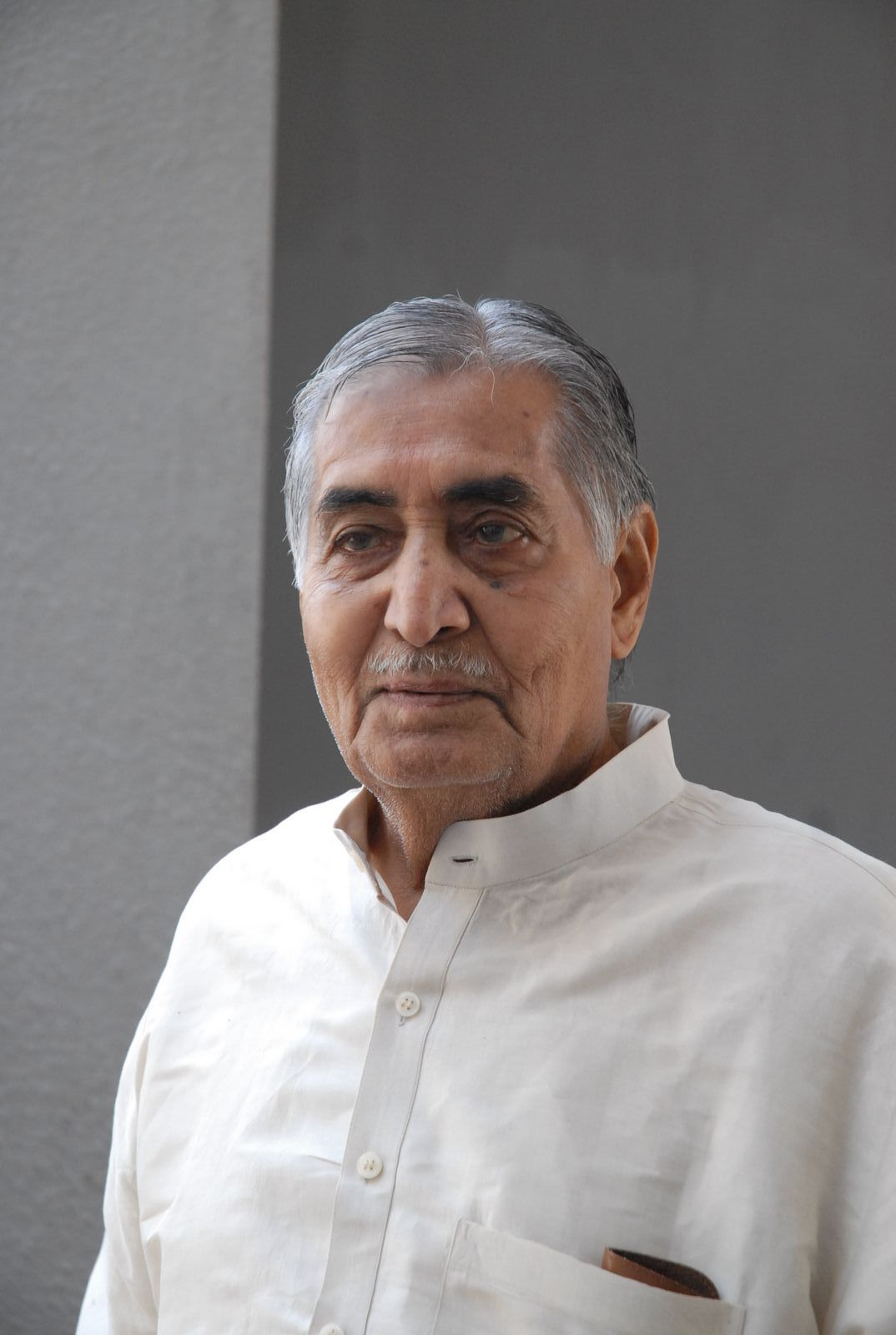

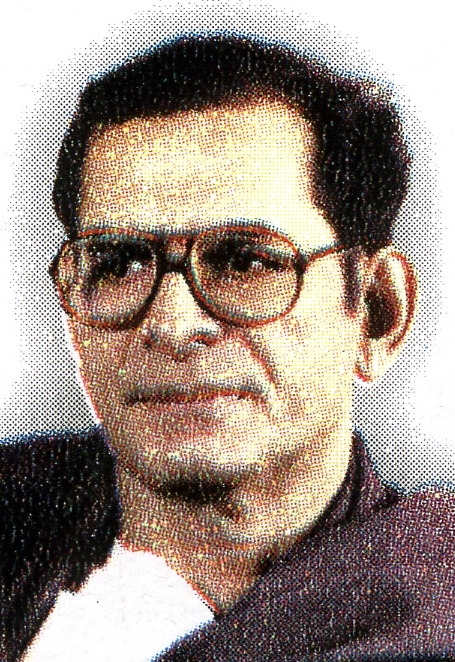
| | Majority party | Minority party |
|---|---|---|
| Leader | Kailash Chandra Joshi | Shyama Charan Shukla |
| Party | JP | INC |
| Leader since | 1980 | 1969 |
| Last election | New Party | - |
| Seats won | 230 | 84 |
| Seat change | ▲230 | ▼136 |
| Popular vote | 55,35,807 | 42,00,717 |
| Percentage | 47.28% | 35.88% |
Chief Minister before election
President's rule
Elected Chief Minister
Kailash Chandra Joshi
JP

Elections to the Madhya Pradesh Legislative Assembly were held in October 1977. The Janata Party won a majority of seats and Kailash Chandra Joshi was sworn in as the new chief minister.

The number of constituencies in Madhya Pradesh were increased to 320, following the recommendation of the Delimitation Commission of India.

== Result ==
| # | Party | Seats contested | Seats won | Seats changed | % votes |
|---|---|---|---|---|---|
| 1 | Janata Party | 319 | 230 | N/A | 47.28% |
| 2 | Indian National Congress (I) | 320 | 84 | ▼136 | 35.88% |
| 3 | Akhil Bharatiya Ram Rajya Parishad | 4 | 1 | N/A | 2.88% |
| 4 | Independent | 320 | 5 | ▼13 | 15.35% |
| | Total | | 320 | | |

== Elected members ==
| Constituency | Reserved for | Member | Party |
|---|---|---|---|
| Sheopur | None | Gulab Singh | Janata Party |
| Bijeypur | None | Ajit Kumar | Janata Party |
| Sabalgarh | None | Sridharlal Hardenia | Janata Party |
| Joura | None | Subedar Singh | Janata Party |
| Sumawali | None | Jahar Singh | Janata Party |
| Morena | None | Jabar Singh | Janata Party |
| Dimni | SC | Munshilal | Janata Party |
| Ambah | SC | Chhokhelal | Janata Party |
| Gohad | SC | Bhurelal | Janata Party |
| Mehgaon | None | Rameshwar Dayal Dantrey | Janata Party |
| Attair | None | Shiv Shankar Lal | Janata Party |
| Bhind | None | Om Kumari Kushwah | Janata Party |
| Ron | None | Rasal Singh | Janata Party |
| Lahar | None | Ram Shankar Singh | Janata Party |
| Gwalior | None | Jagdish Gupta | Janata Party |
| Lashkar East | None | Naresh Johri | Janata Party |
| Lashkar West | None | Shitala Sahai | Janata Party |
| Morar | None | Madhav Rao Shanker Rao Indapurakar | Janata Party |
| Gird | None | Vishnu Datt Tiwari | Janata Party |
| Dabra | None | Gopiram | Janata Party |
| Bhander | SC | Nand Lal Saroniya | Janata Party |
| Seondha | None | Tulsi Ram | Janata Party |
| Datia | None | Shyam Sunder | Indian National Congress |
| Karera | None | Sushma Singh | Janata Party |
| Pohri | None | Damodar Prasad | Janata Party |
| Shivpuri | None | Mahavir Prasad Jain | Janata Party |
| Pichhore | None | Kamal Singh | Janata Party |
| Kolaras | SC | Kamta Prasad Khatik | Janata Party |
| Guna | None | Dharamswarup Saxena | Janata Party |
| Chachaura | None | Krishna Vallabha Bhanwarlal | Janata Party |
| Raghogarh | None | Digvijaya Singh | Indian National Congress |
| Shadora | SC | Har Lal | Janata Party |
| Ashoknagar | None | Chiman Lal Guljarilal | Janata Party |
| Mungaoli | None | Chandramohan Rawat | Janata Party |
| Bina | None | Bhagirath Balgaiya | Janata Party |
| Khurai | SC | Ram Prasad | Janata Party |
| Banda | None | Shivraj Singh | Janata Party |
| Naryaoli | SC | Lila Dhar | Indian National Congress |
| Sagar | None | Shivkumar Jwalaprasad | Indian National Congress |
| Surkhi | None | Laxmi Narayan Yadav | Janata Party |
| Rehli | None | Mahadeo Prasad Hazari | Indian National Congress |
| Deori | None | Parshuram Sahu | Janata Party |
| Niwari | None | Gauri Shankar Shukla | Janata Party |
| Jatara | None | Akhand Pratap Singh | Janata Party |
| Khargapur | SC | Nathu Ram Ahirwar | Janata Party |
| Tikamgarh | None | Magan Lal Goyal | Janata Party |
| Malehra | None | Jang Bahadur Singh | Janata Party |
| Bijawar | None | Mukund Sakharam | Janata Party |
| Chhatarpur | None | Jagdamba Prasad Nigam | Janata Party |
| Maharajpur | SC | Ram Dayal | Janata Party |
| Chandla | None | Raghunath Singh Kalyan Singh | Janata Party |
| Nohata | None | Narendra Singh Thakur | Janata Party |
| Damoh | None | Prabhu Narain Tandon | Indian National Congress |
| Patharia | SC | Jiwan Lal Kanchhadilal | Janata Party |
| Hatta | None | Ram Krishna Kusmariya | Janata Party |
| Panna | None | Lokendra Singh | Janata Party |
| Amanganj | None | Jagsuriya | Janata Party |
| Pawai | None | Uma Shankar | Janata Party |
| Maihar | None | Narayan Singh | Janata Party |
| Nagod | None | Nagendra Singh | Janata Party |
| Raigaon | SC | Vishweshwar Prasad | Janata Party |
| Chitrakoot | None | Ramanand Singh | Janata Party |
| Satna | None | Arun Singh | Indian National Congress |
| Rampur Baghelan | None | Prabhakar Singh | Janata Party |
| Amarpatan | None | Ram Hit | Janata Party |
| Rewa | None | Premalal Mishra | Janata Party |
| Gurh | None | Chandramani Tripathi | Janata Party |
| Mangawan | None | Lal Rukmani Raman Pratap Singh | Indian National Congress |
| Sirmaur | None | Sita Prasad Sharma | Janata Party |
| Teonthar | None | Sriniwas Tiwari | Indian National Congress |
| Deotalab | SC | Khalawan Bhir | Janata Party |
| Mauganj | None | Achyuta Nand | Indian National Congress |
| Churahat | None | Arjun Singh | Indian National Congress |
| Sidhi | None | Indrajeet Kumar | Indian National Congress |
| Gopadbanas | None | Ram Khilawan | Janata Party |
| Dhauhani | ST | Someshwar Singh | Janata Party |
| Deosar | ST | Jagannath Singh | Janata Party |
| Singrauli | SC | Ramcharitra | Janata Party |
| Beohari | None | Baijnath Singh | Janata Party |
| Umaria | None | Nripendra Singh | Janata Party |
| Nowrozabad | ST | Gyan Singh | Janata Party |
| Jaisinghnagar | ST | Ramnath Singh | Janata Party |
| Kotma | ST | Babulal Singh | Janata Party |
| Anuppur | ST | Jugal Kishore Gupta | Janata Party |
| Sohagpur | None | Krishna Pal Singh | Indian National Congress |
| Pushprajgarh | ST | Hazari Singh | Janata Party |
| Manendragarh | ST | Ram Singh | Janata Party |
| Baikunthpur | None | Jwala Prasad | Janata Party |
| Premnagar | ST | Sahadeo Singh | Janata Party |
| Surajpur | ST | Rewati Raman Mishra | Janata Party |
| Pal | ST | Shiv Pratap | Janata Party |
| Samri | ST | Amin | Janata Party |
| Lundra | ST | Asan Ram | Janata Party |
| Pilkha | ST | Nar Narayan | Janata Party |
| Ambikapur | ST | Prabhunarayan Tripathi | Janata Party |
| Sitapur | ST | Sukhi Ram | Indian National Congress |
| Bagicha | ST | Balsyus Bolva | Indian National Congress |
| Jashpur | ST | Sukh Ram | Janata Party |
| Tapkara | ST | Nand Kumar Sai | Janata Party |
| Pathalgaon | ST | Ram Pukar Singh | Indian National Congress |
| Dharamjaigarh | ST | Ghanesh Ram Rathia | Indian National Congress |
| Lailunga | ST | Surendra Singh | Indian National Congress |
| Raigarh | None | Ram Kumar Aggarwal | Indian National Congress |
| Kharsia | None | Laxmi Prasad Patel | Indian National Congress |
| Saria | None | Kumari Kamla Devi Naresh Chandra Singh | Indian National Congress |
| Sarangarh | SC | Hulasram Manhar | Indian National Congress |
| Rampur | ST | Nankiram Kanwar | Janata Party |
| Katghora | None | Bodhram | Indian National Congress |
| Tanakhar | ST | Bishal Singh | Janata Party |
| Marwahi | ST | Bhawar Singh Parte | Indian National Congress |
| Kota | None | M. P. Dubey | Indian National Congress |
| Lormi | None | Phool Chand Jain | Janata Party |
| Mungeli | SC | Rameshwar Prasad Kosaria | Janata Party |
| Jarhagaon | SC | Bhanu Pratap Gupta | Janata Party |
| Takhatpur | None | Manharanlal Pandey | Janata Party |
| Bilaspur | None | B. R. Yadav | Indian National Congress |
| Bilha | None | Chitra Kant Jaiswal | Indian National Congress |
| Masturi | SC | Banshilal Ghritlahare | Indian National Congress |
| Sipat | None | Radheyshyam Shukla | Indian National Congress |
| Akaltara | None | Rajendra Kumar Singh | Indian National Congress |
| Pamgarh | None | Shivprasad Sharma | Indian National Congress |
| Champa | None | Bisahu Das Mahant | Indian National Congress |
| Sakti | None | Raja Surendra Bahadur | Indian National Congress |
| Malkharoda | SC | Bed Ram | Indian National Congress |
| Chandrapur | None | Bhawanilal Varma | Indian National Congress |
| Raipur Town | None | Rajani D. P. Upasane | Janata Party |
| Raipur Rural | None | Ramesh Warlyani | Janata Party |
| Abhanpur | None | Chetram Purushottam | Janata Party |
| Mandirhasod | None | Ram Lal Jodhan | Janata Party |
| Arang | SC | Ratandas Hardas | Janata Party |
| Dharsiwa | None | Ashwini Kumar Lakhanlal | Janata Party |
| Bhatapara | None | Jagdish Prasad Aggarwal | Indian National Congress |
| Baloda Bazar | None | Vansraj Mahabir Prasad | Janata Party |
| Pallari | SC | Phulsingh Budhu | Indian National Congress |
| Kasdol | None | Dhani Ram Sahu | Janata Party |
| Bhatgaon | SC | Kanhaiyalal Kasoriya | Indian National Congress |
| Saraipali | None | Mohanlal Ramprasad | Indian National Congress |
| Basna | None | Birendra Bahadur Singh Lal Bahadur | Indian National Congress |
| Khallari | None | Ramesh | Janata Party |
| Mahasamund | None | Mohd. Yakub Ah. Karim | Janata Party |
| Rajim | None | Pawan Diwan Sukhramdhar | Janata Party |
| Bindranawagarh | ST | Balram Jugsay | Janata Party |
| Sihawa | ST | Madhav Laxman | Janata Party |
| Kurud | None | Yeshwant Rao Meghawale | Janata Party |
| Dhamtari | None | Pandhrirao Khushalrao | Janata Party |
| Bhanupratappur | ST | Pyarelal Suklalsingh | Janata Party |
| Kanker | ST | Harishankar Ramnath | Janata Party |
| Keskal | ST | Mangli Jhadu Ram | Janata Party |
| Kondagaon | ST | Mankuram Sodi | Indian National Congress |
| Bhanpuri | ST | Baliram Mahadeo Kashyap | Janata Party |
| Jagdalpur | ST | Birendra Pandey | Janata Party |
| Keslur | ST | Joga Hadma | Janata Party |
| Chitrakote | ST | Lakhanjai Sngh | Janata Party |
| Dantewara | ST | Sukuldhar Bhawani | Janata Party |
| Konta | ST | Koram Gopal Kristaiya | Janata Party |
| Bijapur | ST | Mahadev Ayatoo Ram | Janata Party |
| Narayanpur | ST | Gadru Ram Sori | Janata Party |
| Maro | SC | Gophelal Kurree | Janata Party |
| Bemetara | None | Laxman Prasad Vaidya | Indian National Congress |
| Saja | None | Pradeep Kumar Choube | Janata Party |
| Dhamdha | None | Dharampal Singh Gupta | Janata Party |
| Durg | None | Motilal Vora | Indian National Congress |
| Bhilai | None | Dinkar Dhage | Janata Party |
| Patan | None | Keju Ram Varma | Indian National Congress |
| Gunderdehi | None | Ghana Ram | Indian National Congress |
| Khertha | None | Vasudeo Chandrakar | Indian National Congress |
| Balod | None | Mishrilal Khatri | Independent |
| Dondi Lohara | ST | Jhummuklal Bhediya | Indian National Congress |
| Chowki | ST | Manjhla Kumar ( Bhupendra Shah ) | Janata Party |
| Khujji | None | Prakash Yadav | Janata Party |
| Dongargaon | None | Vidya Bhushan Thakur | Janata Party |
| Rajnandgaon | None | Thakur Darbar Singh | Janata Party |
| Dongargarh | SC | Vinayak Meshram | Janata Party |
| Khairagarh | None | Manik Gupta | Janata Party |
| Birendranagar | None | Balram Singh Bais | Indian National Congress |
| Kawardha | None | Shashi Prabha Devi | Akhil Bharatiya Ram Rajya Parishad |
| Baihar | ST | Sudhanvasingh Netam | Janata Party |
| Lanji | None | Yashwant Rao Khongal | Indian National Congress |
| Kirnapur | None | Jhankarsingh Chandanlal | Indian National Congress |
| Waraseoni | None | K.D. Deshmukh Bathu | Janata Party |
| Khairalanjee | None | Shankar Sao | Indian National Congress |
| Katangi | None | Lochanlal Thare Narayan | Janata Party |
| Balaghat | None | Nand Kishore Shrama | Indian National Congress |
| Paraswada | None | Tejlal Tembhare | Indian National Congress |
| Nainpur | ST | Ghanshyam Prasad | Janata Party |
| Mandla | ST | Vijay Datt Jha | Janata Party |
| Bichhia | ST | Mangilal | Janata Party |
| Bajag | ST | Chintaram Masram | Janata Party |
| Dindori | ST | Moti Singh Sandhya | Independent |
| Shahpura | ST | Anup Singh Marabi | Janata Party |
| Niwas | ST | Rup Singh | Janata Party |
| Bargi | ST | Shivprasad Chinpuria | Janata Party |
| Panagar | ST | D.P. Pathak | Indian National Congress |
| Jabalpur Cantonment | None | Dinesh Chand Mishra | Indian National Congress |
| Jabalpur East | SC | Kailash Surajbalee Sonkar | Janata Party |
| Jabalpur Central | None | Jaishiri Benerjee | Janata Party |
| Jabalpur West | None | K.L. Dubey | Indian National Congress |
| Patan | None | Prithvi Singh | Indian National Congress |
| Majholi | None | Gontia Trimbakeshwar Prasad Dubey | Indian National Congress |
| Sihora | None | Dhanya Kumar | Janata Party |
| Bahoriband | None | Tarachand Chaurasia | Janata Party |
| Murwara | None | Vibhash Chandra | Janata Party |
| Badwara | None | Bachhan Nayak | Janata Party |
| Vijairaghogarh | None | Laxmichand Bajhal | Janata Party |
| Gadarwara | None | Nageen Kochar | Janata Party |
| Bohani | None | Sujansingh | Indian National Congress |
| Narsimhapur | None | Surendra Kumar Dhoreliaurf Munna Bhaiya | Janata Party |
| Gotegaon | SC | Saraschandra Jharia | Janata Party |
| Lakhnadon | ST | Satyendra Singh Deep Singh Thakur | Indian National Congress |
| Ghansor | ST | Vasant Rao Uike | Indian National Congress |
| Keolari | None | Vimla Varma Krishna Prasad Varma | Indian National Congress |
| Barghat | None | Bharatlal Bisen | Indian National Congress |
| Seoni | None | Prabha Bhargwa | Indian National Congress |
| Jamai | ST | Sunderlal Brijlal | Indian National Congress |
| Chhindwara | None | Bijay Kumar Panti(Hitlar) | Indian National Congress |
| Parasia | SC | Damodar Tulsiram (Damu Patil) | Indian National Congress |
| Damua | ST | Mandir Sa | Janata Party |
| Amarwara | ST | Dakhan Shah Thakur | Indian National Congress |
| Chaurai | None | Baijnath Prasad Saxena | Indian National Congress |
| Sausar | None | Rewnath Nathujee Choure | Indian National Congress |
| Pandhurna | None | Madhavlal Dubey | Indian National Congress |
| Piparia | None | Ramchandra Maheshwari | Janata Party |
| Hoshangabad | None | Ramesh Bargale | Janata Party |
| Itarsi | None | Narmada Prasad Soni | Janata Party |
| Seoni-Malwa | None | Hazarilal Raghubanshi | Indian National Congress |
| Timarni | SC | Manoharlal Hazarilal | Janata Party |
| Harda | None | Babulal Silapuria (Nazirjee) | Janata Party |
| Multai | None | Maniram Barange | Independent |
| Masod | None | Ramji Mahajan | Indian National Congress |
| Bhainsdehi | ST | Patiram | Janata Party |
| Betul | None | Madhav Gopal Naseree | Independent |
| Ghora Dongri | ST | Jangusingh Uike | Janata Party |
| Amla | SC | Gurubux Atulkar | Indian National Congress |
| Budhni | None | Shaligram Vakil | Janata Party |
| Ichhawar | None | Narayan Prasad Gupta | Janata Party |
| Ashta | SC | Narayan Singh Kesri | Janata Party |
| Sehore | None | Sabita Bajpai | Janata Party |
| Govindpura | None | Laxmi Narain Sharma | Janata Party |
| Bhopal South | None | Babulal Gour | Janata Party |
| Bhopal North | None | Hamid Qureshi | Janata Party |
| Berasia | None | Gauri Shanker Koushal | Janata Party |
| Sanchi | SC | Gourishanker | Janata Party |
| Udaipura | None | Goverdhan Singh | Janata Party |
| Bareli | None | Sudhar Singh | Janata Party |
| Bhojpur | None | Parab Chand Lakhmichand | Janata Party |
| Kurwai | SC | Ram Charan Lal | Janata Party |
| Basoda | None | Jamna Prasad Beharilal | Janata Party |
| Vidisha | None | Narsinghdas Goyal | Janata Party |
| Shamshabad | None | Girischand Ramsahay | Janata Party |
| Sironj | None | Sharif Master | Janata Party |
| Biaora | None | Dattatre Rao Madho Rao | Janata Party |
| Narsingarh | None | Siddhumal Dallumal | Janata Party |
| Sarangpur | SC | Amarsingh Motilal | Independent |
| Rajgarh | None | Jamnalal Bhanwarlal | Janata Party |
| Khilchipur | None | Narayan Singh Panwar | Janata Party |
| Shujalpur | None | Shall Kumar Sharma | Janata Party |
| Gulana | None | Bhavanishankar Gothi | Janata Party |
| Shajapur | None | Shashikant Shendurnaikar | Janata Party |
| Agar | SC | Satyanarayan Jatiya | Janata Party |
| Susner | None | Hari Bhau Joshi | Janata Party |
| Tarana | SC | Nagulal Malviya | Janata Party |
| Mahidpur | None | Shiv Narayan Choudhry | Janata Party |
| Khachrod | None | Purusottam Vipat | Janata Party |
| Badnagar | None | Udaisingh Pandya | Janata Party |
| Ghatiya | SC | Gangaram Parmar | Janata Party |
| Ujjain North | None | Babulal Jain | Janata Party |
| Ujjain South | None | Govindrao Vishvanath Naik | Janata Party |
| Depalpur | None | Patan Patodi | Janata Party |
| Mhow | None | Ghanshyam Seth Patidar | Indian National Congress |
| Indore-I | None | Om Prakash Rawal | Janata Party |
| Indore-Ii | None | Yagyadatt Sharma | Indian National Congress |
| Indore-Iii | None | Rajendra Dharkar | Janata Party |
| Indore-Iv | None | Vallabh Sharma | Janata Party |
| Indore-V | None | Suresh Seth | Indian National Congress |
| Sawer | SC | Arjun Singh Dharu | Janata Party |
| Dewas | None | Shankar Kannungo Trimbakrao | Janata Party |
| Sonkatch | SC | Devilal Raikwal Bulchand | Janata Party |
| Hatpipliya | None | Tejsingh Sendhav | Janata Party |
| Bagli | None | Kailash Chandra Joshi | Janata Party |
| Khategaon | None | Kinkar Narmadaprasad Govind Ram | Janata Party |
| Harsud | ST | Suraj Mal Balu | Janata Party |
| Nimarkhedi | None | Raghurajsingh Tomar | Janata Party |
| Pandhana | SC | Sakharam Deokaran | Janata Party |
| Khandwa | None | Govind Prasad Gite | Janata Party |
| Nepanagar | None | Brijmohan Mishra | Janata Party |
| Shahpur | None | Deshmukh Dhairyasheel Rao Keshav Rao | Janata Party |
| Burhanpur | None | Shiv Kumar Singh Nawal Singh | Indian National Congress |
| Bhikangaon | ST | Dongar Singh Patel | Janata Party |
| Barwaha | None | Ramesh Sharma | Janata Party |
| Maheshwar | SC | Nathubhai Sawale | Janata Party |
| Kasrawad | None | Bankim Joshi | Janata Party |
| Khargone | None | Navneet Mahajan | Janata Party |
| Dhulkot | ST | Malsingh Latu | Janata Party |
| Sendhwa | ST | Raoji Kalji | Janata Party |
| Anjad | ST | Babulal Dashrath Soni | Janata Party |
| Rajpur | ST | Veersingh Devisingh | Janata Party |
| Barwani | ST | Umaraosingh Parvatsingh | Janata Party |
| Manawar | ST | Shivbhanu Solanki | Indian National Congress |
| Dharampuri | ST | Kiratsingh | Indian National Congress |
| Dhar | None | Vikram Verma | Janata Party |
| Badnawar | None | Goerdhan Sharma | Janata Party |
| Sardarpur | ST | Moolchand Patel | Indian National Congress |
| Kukshi | ST | Pratapsinh Baghel | Indian National Congress |
| Alirajpur | ST | Bhagwan Singh Chauhan | Janata Party |
| Jobat | ST | Ajmer Singh | Indian National Congress |
| Jhabua | ST | Bapusingh Damer | Indian National Congress |
| Petlawad | ST | Pratap Singh | Janata Party |
| Thandla | ST | Mannaji | Janata Party |
| Ratlam Town | None | Himmat Kothari | Janata Party |
| Ratlam Rural | None | Surajmal Jain | Janata Party |
| Sailana | ST | Kamji | Janata Party |
| Jaora | None | Komal Singh Rathore | Janata Party |
| Alot | SC | Navratan Sankla | Janata Party |
| Manasa | None | Ramchandra Basar | Janata Party |
| Garoth | None | Ragunandan | Janata Party |
| Suwasara | SC | Champalala Arya | Janata Party |
| Sitamau | None | Pt. Basantilal Sharma | Janata Party |
| Mandsaur | None | Sunderlal Patwa | Janata Party |
| Neemuch | None | Kanhaiyalal Dungerwal | Janata Party |
| Jawad | None | Virendra Kumar Sakhlecha | Janata Party |
