= Kailash Chandra Joshi =

9th Chief Minister of Madhya Pradesh

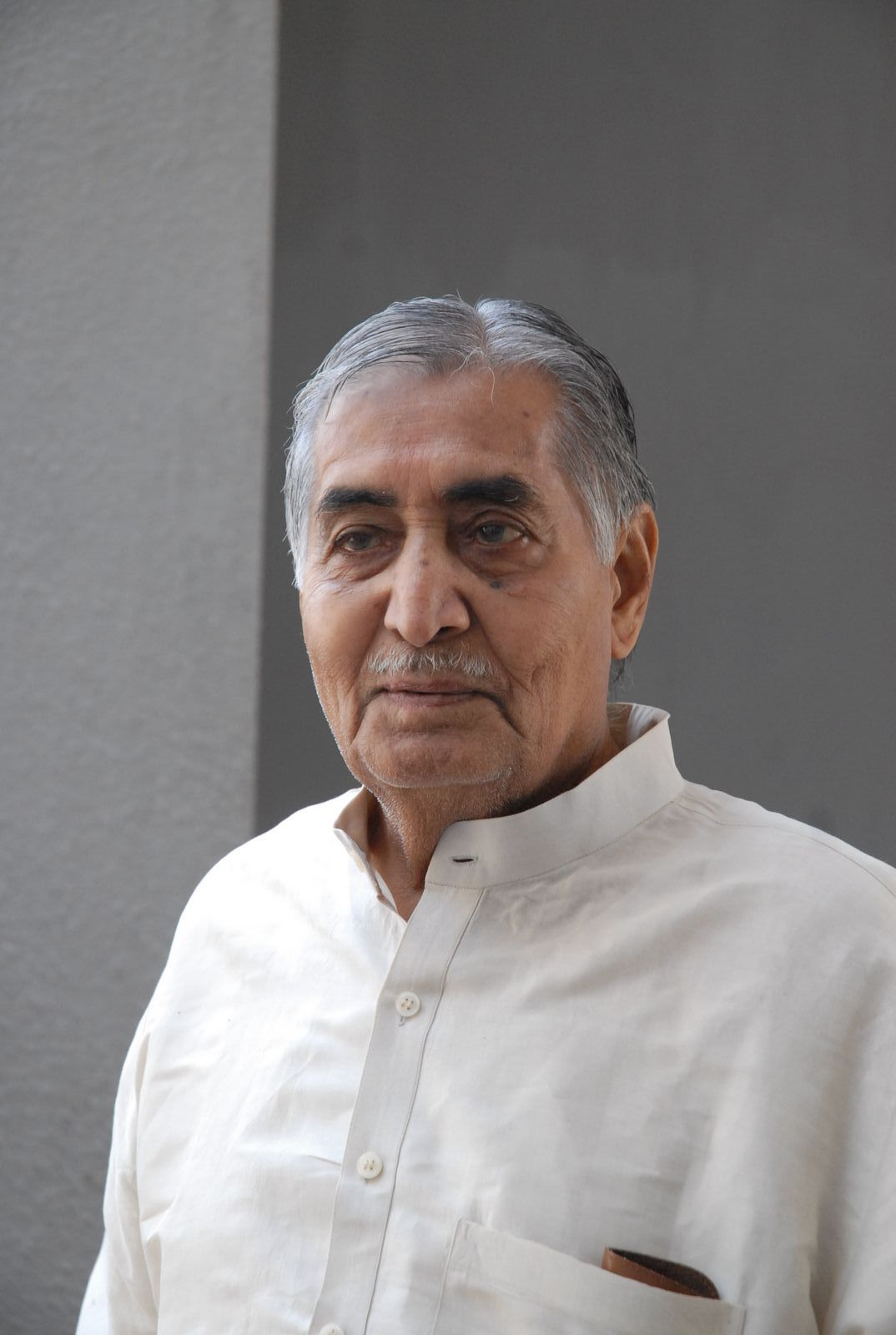

9th Chief Minister of Madhya Pradesh
- In office 24 June 1977 – 17 January 1978
- Preceded by: Shyama Charan Shukla
- Succeeded by: Virendra Kumar Sakhlecha

Leader of the Opposition Madhya Pradesh Legislative Assembly
- In office 23 March 1985 – 3 March 1990
- Chief Minister: Motilal Vora; Arjun Singh; Shyama Charan Shukla
- Preceded by: Sunderlal Patwa
- Succeeded by: Shyama Charan Shukla
- In office 28 March 1972 – 30 April 1977
- Chief Minister: Prakash Chandra Sethi; Shyama Charan Shukla
- Preceded by: Vasant Sadashiv Pradhan
- Succeeded by: Arjun Singh

Member of Parliament Lok Sabha
- In office 2004–2014
- Preceded by: Uma Bharti
- Succeeded by: Alok Sanjar
- Constituency: Bhopal

Member of Parliament Rajya Sabha
- In office 3 April 2000 – 13 May 2004
- Succeeded by: Narayan Singh Kesari
- Constituency: Madhya Pradesh

Member of Madhya Pradesh Legislative Assembly
- In office 1962–1998
- Preceded by: seat established
- Succeeded by: Shyam Holani
- Constituency: Bagli

Personal details
- Born: 14 July 1929 Hatpipliya, Dewas State, British India
- Died: 24 November 2019 (aged 90) Bhopal, Madhya Pradesh, India
- Party: BJP
- Spouse: Tara Joshi
- Children: 3 sons and 3 daughters

Kailash Chandra Joshi (14 July 1929 – 24 November 2019) was an Indian politician who was the 9th Chief Minister of Madhya Pradesh in 1970s. Later he was a member of Rajya Sabha from Madhya Pradesh (2000–2004), and a member of Lok Sabha (2004–2014) from Bhopal belonging to the Bharatiya Janata Party (BJP). He started his political career with the Bharatiya Jana Sangh, which later morphed into BJP.

== Personal life ==
He was born in 1929 to Shri Umashankar Joshi & Smt. Rambha Bai Joshi a Bawisa Brahmin (Adi Gaur) Family in Hatpipaliya, Dewas. He was married in 1951 to Smt. Tara Joshi having 3 sons & 3 daughters. His son, Deepak Joshi was the MLA for Bagli from 2003 to 2008 and later, the MLA for Hatpipliya from 2008 to 2018.

Kailash Joshi died at the age of 90 on 24 November 2019.

== Career ==
He served six months as the 9th Chief Minister of Madhya Pradesh, from June 1977 to January 1978 as a member of Janata Party. He was MLA for eight consecutive terms from 1962 to 1998 from Bagli constituency of Madhya Pradesh Legislative Assembly as a member of Jana Sangh, briefly Janata Party, and finally BJP.

He was BJP's losing candidate from Rajgarh (Lok Sabha constituency) in February 1998. Later that year, he lost the assembly election from his stronghold of Bagli. He served as member of the Rajya Sabha from 2000 to 2004. He was a member of the Lok Sabha from 2004 to 2014, representing the Bhopal constituency in Madhya Pradesh, as a member of BJP.

Lok Sabha
Preceded by Uma Bharti	Member of Parliament for Bhopal; 2004 – 2014	Succeeded by Alok Sanjar
Political offices
Preceded by President's rule	Chief Minister of Madhya Pradesh; 24 June 1977 – 17 January 1978	Succeeded by Virendra Kumar Sakhlecha
