= Chapda =

- Village
- Location in Madhya Pradesh, India Chapda (India)
- Coordinates: 22°42′0″N 76°19′0″E
- Country: India
- State: Madhya Pradesh
- District: Dewas

Government
  - Body: Bagli Tehsil

Population (2011)
  - Total: 6,624

Languages
  - Official: Hindi
- Time zone: UTC+5:30 (IST)
- PIN: 455227
- ISO 3166 code: IN-MP
- Vehicle registration: MP

Chapda is a town in the Dewas district Tehsil-Bagli of Madhya Pradesh state in India. Chapda is around 52.8 km (32.8 mi) from Indore.

== Demographics ==
The Chapada village has a population of 6624. In 2011, the literacy rate of Chapada village was 73.20% compared to 69.32% in Madhya Pradesh. In Chapada, Male literacy stands at 83.04% while the female literacy rate was 62.79%.

== See also ==
- Dewas district
- Bagli, Dewas
