= 1980 Madhya Pradesh Legislative Assembly election =

Indian state election

- 28 and 31 May 1980

All 320 assembly constituencies 161 seats needed for a majority
- Registered: 25,349,898
- Turnout: 49.03%
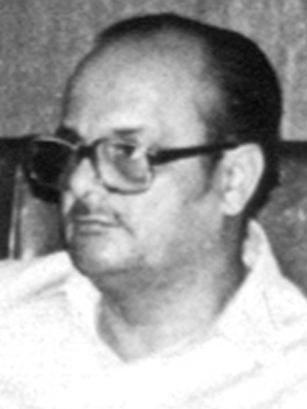

	Majority party	Minority party
Leader	Arjun Singh	Sunderlal Patwa
Party	INC	BJP
Leader's seat	Churhat (Won)	Sehore (Lost)
Last election	84	New
Seats after	246	60
Seat change	▲162
Popular vote	57,41,077	36,65,201
Percentage	47.52%	31.38%
Chief Minister before election
President's Rule
Elected Chief Minister
Arjun Singh
INC

Elections to the Madhya Pradesh Legislative Assembly were held in May 1980. The Indian National Congress won a majority of seats and Arjun Singh was sworn in as the new Chief Minister.

After the 1972 Madhya Pradesh Legislative Assembly election, the number of constituencies in Madhya Pradesh was increased to 320, following the recommendation of the Delimitation Commission of India.

The elections were held after President Neelam Sanjiva Reddy ordered the imposition of president's rule in the state on the advice of the Fourth Indira Gandhi ministry, which acted on the basis that the victory of the Indian National Congress in the 1980 Indian general election proved that the state government no longer reflected the will of the pepule.

== Result ==
Party	Votes	%	Seats	
Party	Votes	%	Contested	Won
Indian National Congress	5,741,077	47.52	320	246
Bharatiya Janata Party	3,665,201	30.34	310	60
Janata Party (Secular)	582,769	4.82	181	1
Janata Party (JP)	348,030	2.88	104	2
Communist Party of India	181,239	1.50	46	2
Indian National Congress (U)	166,281	1.38	72	–
Janata Party (Secular) Raj Narain	66,627	0.55	53	–
Republican Party of India (Khobragade)	40,092	0.33	13	1
Communist Party of India (Marxist)	32,663	0.27	7	–
Akhil Bharatiya Ram Rajya Parishad	18,253	0.15	4	–
Socialist Unity Centre of India	141	0.00	1	–
Independents	1,239,931	10.26	288	8
Total	12,082,304	100.00	1399	320
Valid votes	12,082,304	97.21		
Invalid/blank votes	346,580	2.79		
Total votes	12,428,884	100.00		
Registered voters/turnout	25,349,898	49.03		

== Elected members ==
Constituency	Reserved for	Member	Party
Sheopur	None	Badri Prasad	Indian National Congress
Bijeypur	None	Jagmohan Singh	Indian National Congress
Sabalgarh	None	Suresh Chandra	Indian National Congress
Joura	None	Ramchanran Lal Mishra	Indian National Congress
Sumawali	None	Yogender Singh	Bharatiya Janata Party
Morena	None	Maharaj Singh	Indian National Congress
Dimni	SC	Munshilal	Bharatiya Janata Party
Ambah	SC	Kamodilal	Indian National Congress
Gohad	SC	Shreeram Jatav	Bharatiya Janata Party
Mehgaon	None	Rai Singh Bhadoriya	Independent
Attair	None	Parshuramsingh Bhadoriya	Indian National Congress
Bhind	None	Choudhary Dilip Singh	Bharatiya Janata Party
Ron	None	Ramashankar	Janata Party
Lahar	None	Ramashankar Chowdhary	Indian National Congress
Gwalior	None	Tara Singh Viyogi	Indian National Congress
Lashkar East	None	Gangaram Bandil	Bharatiya Janata Party
Lashkar West	None	Shitla Sahai	Bharatiya Janata Party
Morar	None	Kaptan Singh	Indian National Congress
Gird	None	Balendu Shukla	Indian National Congress
Dabra	None	Jaggannath Singh	Bharatiya Janata Party
Bhander	SC	Kamlapat Arya	Indian National Congress
Seondha	SC	Mangal Singh	Indian National Congress
Datia	None	Shyam Sunder Shyam	Indian National Congress
Karera	None	Hanumant Singh	Indian National Congress
Pohri	None	Hari Ballabh Shukla	Indian National Congress
Shivpuri	None	Ganeshram Goutam	Indian National Congress
Pichhore	None	Bhaiya Saheb	Indian National Congress
Kolaras	SC	Pooran Singh Kanhaiyalal	Indian National Congress
Guna	None	Shiv Pratap Singh	Indian National Congress
Chachaura	None	Devender Singh	Indian National Congress
Raghogarh	None	Digvijay Singh	Indian National Congress
Shadora	SC	Ram Suman	Indian National Congress
Ashoknagar	None	Mahender Singh	Indian National Congress
Mungaoli	None	Gajram Singh	Indian National Congress
Bina	None	Arvind Bhai	Indian National Congress
Khurai	SC	Harishankar Mangal Prasad Ahirwar	Indian National Congress
Banda	None	Premnarayan Gorelal	Indian National Congress
Naryaoli	SC	Uttam Chand Kundanlal Khatik	Indian National Congress
Sagar	None	Shivkumar Jwalaprasad	Indian National Congress
Surkhi	None	Bittal Bhai Lallubhai	Indian National Congress
Rehli	None	Mahadev Prasad Manoharlal	Indian National Congress
Deori	None	Parashuram Sahu	Bharatiya Janata Party
Niwari	None	Chaturvedi Ram Rattan	Indian National Congress
Jatara	None	Swami Prasad Pastor	Independent
Khargapur	SC	Ahirwar Nathuram Bhamera	Indian National Congress
Tikamgarh	None	Sardar Singh	Indian National Congress
Malehra	None	Kapurchand Pyarelal	Communist Party of India
Bijawar	None	Yadevendra Singh Allias Laluraja	Indian National Congress
Chhatarpur	None	Shankar Pratap Singh Bhadur Singh	Indian National Congress
Maharajpur	SC	Ahirwar Laxman Das	Indian National Congress
Chandla	None	Chaturvedi Satyavrat	Indian National Congress
Nohata	None	Ratnesh Solomon Peter Solomon	Indian National Congress
Damoh	None	Chandranarayan Ramdhan	Indian National Congress
Patharia	SC	Gopaldas Munnilal	Indian National Congress
Hatta	None	Snehsalila Hazari	Indian National Congress
Panna	None	Het Ram Dubey	Indian National Congress
Amanganj	SC	Sundara	Indian National Congress
Pawai	None	Captain Jaipal Singh	Indian National Congress
Maihar	None	Vijay Narayan	Indian National Congress
Nagod	None	Nagendra Singh	Bharatiya Janata Party
Raigaon	SC	Ramashraya Prasad	Indian National Congress
Chitrakoot	None	Ram Chandra Bajpayee	Indian National Congress
Satna	None	Lalta Prasad Khare	Indian National Congress
Rampur Baghelan	None	Harsh Singh	Indian National Congress
Amarpatan	None	Rajendra Kumar Singh	Indian National Congress
Rewa	None	Muni Prasad	Indian National Congress
Gurh	None	Rajendra Prasad	Indian National Congress
Mangawan	None	Champa Devi	Indian National Congress
Sirmaur	None	Rajmani Patel	Indian National Congress
Teonthar	None	Shriniwas Tewari	Indian National Congress
Deotalab	SC	Ram Khelawan	Indian National Congress
Mauganj	None	Achyutanand	Indian National Congress
Churahat	None	Arjun Singh	Indian National Congress
Sidhi	None	Indrajit Kumar	Indian National Congress
Gopadbanas	None	Kamleshwar Prasad	Indian National Congress
Dhauhani	ST	Jagwa Devi	Indian National Congress
Deosar	ST	Patiraj Singh	Indian National Congress
Singrauli	SC	Banshmani Prasad	Indian National Congress
Beohari	None	Ram Kishore Shukla	Indian National Congress
Umaria	None	Shanti Sharma	Indian National Congress
Nowrozabad	ST	Gyan Singh	Bharatiya Janata Party
Jaisinghnagar	ST	Kamla Prasad Singh	Indian National Congress
Kotma	ST	Bhagwandeen	Indian National Congress
Anuppur	ST	Bishanlal	Indian National Congress
Sohagpur	None	Krishnapal Singh	Indian National Congress
Pushprajgarh	ST	Ambika Singh	Indian National Congress
Manendragarh	ST	Bijay Singh	Indian National Congress
Baikunthpur	None	Devender Kumari	Indian National Congress
Premnagar	ST	Chandan Singh	Indian National Congress
Surajpur	ST	Lal Vijay Pratap	Indian National Congress
Pal	ST	Deo Sai	Indian National Congress
Samri	ST	Larang Sai	Bharatiya Janata Party
Lundra	ST	Bhola	Indian National Congress
Pilkha	ST	Prem Sai	Indian National Congress
Ambikapur	ST	Madan Gopal	Indian National Congress
Sitapur	ST	Sukhi Ram	Indian National Congress
Bagicha	ST	Blasius Ekka	Indian National Congress
Jashpur	ST	Luic Beck	Indian National Congress
Tapkara	ST	Deneshwar Sai	Indian National Congress
Pathalgaon	ST	Rampukar Singh	Indian National Congress
Dharamjaigarh	ST	Chaneshram Rathiya	Indian National Congress
Lailunga	ST	Surender Kumar Singh	Indian National Congress
Raigarh	None	Krishan Kumar	Indian National Congress
Kharsia	None	Laxmiprasad Patel	Indian National Congress
Saria	None	Kamla Kumari	Indian National Congress
Sarangarh	SC	Hulas Ram Manhar	Indian National Congress
Rampur	ST	Pyarelal	Indian National Congress
Katghora	None	Bodharam	Indian National Congress
Tanakhar	ST	Lalkriti Kumar Singh	Indian National Congress
Marwahi	ST	Bhanwar Singh	Indian National Congress
Kota	None	Mathura Prasad Dubey	Indian National Congress
Lormi	None	Baijnath Chandra Kar	Indian National Congress
Mungeli	SC	Khelendass	Indian National Congress
Jarhagaon	SC	Shiv Prasad	Indian National Congress
Takhatpur	None	Taherbhai	Indian National Congress
Bilaspur	None	B. R. Yadav	Indian National Congress
Bilha	None	Chitrakantjaiswal	Indian National Congress
Masturi	SC	Banshilal	Indian National Congress
Sipat	None	Radhey Shyam	Indian National Congress
Akaltara	None	Dhirender Kumar Singh	Indian National Congress
Pamgarh	None	Shiv Prasad Sharma	Indian National Congress
Champa	None	Charandas Mahant	Indian National Congress
Sakti	None	Raja Surender Bahadur	Indian National Congress
Malkharoda	SC	Vedram	Indian National Congress
Chandrapur	None	Bhawani Lal	Indian National Congress
Raipur Town	None	Swarupchan Jain	Indian National Congress
Raipur Rural	None	Tarunprasad	Indian National Congress
Abhanpur	None	Tetku	Indian National Congress
Mandirhasod	None	Ramesh Bais	Bharatiya Janata Party
Arang	SC	Vijaykumar	Indian National Congress
Dharsiwa	None	Mahant Rameshwar Giri	Indian National Congress
Bhatapara	None	Jagdish Prasad Aggarwal	Indian National Congress
Baloda Bazar	None	Ganeshshankar	Indian National Congress
Palari	SC	Phool Singh	Indian National Congress
Kasdol	None	Kanhaiyalal Sharma	Indian National Congress
Bhatgaon	SC	Kumar Bhatiya	Indian National Congress
Saraipali	None	Mohanlal	Indian National Congress
Basna	None	Mahendra Bahadur Singh	Indian National Congress
Khallari	None	Laxminarayan Induria	Indian National Congress
Mahasamund	None	Maksudanlal	Indian National Congress
Rajim	None	Jiwanlal Sahu	Indian National Congress
Bindranawagarh	ST	Balram	Bharatiya Janata Party
Sihawa	ST	Ram Nath	Indian National Congress
Kurud	None	Chandrahas	Indian National Congress
Dhamtari	None	Jayaben	Indian National Congress
Bhanupratappur	ST	Ganga Potai	Indian National Congress
Kanker	ST	Atmaram Dhruwa	Independent
Keskal	ST	Lambodar Baliar	Indian National Congress
Kondagaon	ST	Mankuram Sodi	Indian National Congress
Bhanpuri	ST	Baliram Mahadeo Kashyap	Bharatiya Janata Party
Jagdalpur	ST	Bhursuram Nag	Indian National Congress
Keslur	ST	Joga Hadma	Bharatiya Janata Party
Chitrakote	ST	Lakhan Jaisingh	Bharatiya Janata Party
Dantewada	ST	Mahendra Karma	Communist Party of India
Konta	ST	Jogiya Muka	Independent
Bijapur	ST	Mahadeo Rana	Indian National Congress
Narayanpur	ST	Shambhunath Naik	Janata Party
Maro	SC	Derhu Prasad Dhratlehare	Indian National Congress
Bemetara	None	Ravendra Singh	Indian National Congress
Saja	None	Kumari Devi Chaubey	Indian National Congress
Dhamdha	None	Piyarelal Belchandan	Indian National Congress
Durg	None	Motilal Vora	Indian National Congress
Bhilai	None	Phoolchand Bapna	Indian National Congress
Patan	None	Chelaram Chandrakar	Indian National Congress
Gunderdehi	None	Harihar Prasad Sharma	Indian National Congress
Khertha	None	Vasudeo Chandrakar	Indian National Congress
Balod	None	Hiralal Sonboir	Indian National Congress
Dondi Lohara	ST	Jhumaklal Bhendia	Indian National Congress
Chowki	ST	Goverdhan Netam	Indian National Congress
Khujji	None	Hari Prasad Sukla	Independent
Dongargaon	None	Hiraram Verma	Indian National Congress
Rajnandgaon	None	Kishorilal Shukla	Independent
Dongargarh	SC	Tuman Lal	Indian National Congress
Khairagarh	None	Rashmi Devi	Indian National Congress
Birendranagar	None	Balram Singh Bais	Indian National Congress
Kawardha	None	Hamidullah Khan	Independent
Baihar	ST	Ganpat Singh	Indian National Congress
Lanji	None	Yashwantrao Balaram Khongl	Indian National Congress
Kirnapur	None	Bhuwanlal Girmaji	Bharatiya Janata Party
Waraseoni	None	K. D. Deshmukh	Janata Party
Khairlanji	None	Domansingh Nagpure Alias Baba Patel	Republican Party of India
Katangi	None	Lochanlal Thakre Narayan	Bharatiya Janata Party
Balaghat	None	Surendra Nath Khare	Indian National Congress
Paraswada	None	Tejlal Tambhare Harishchandra	Indian National Congress
Nainpur	ST	Laxmi Prasad Uike	Indian National Congress
Mandla	ST	Mohanlal	Indian National Congress
Bichhia	ST	Manik Lal Pareti	Indian National Congress
Bajag	ST	Jodha Singh Markan	Indian National Congress
Dindori	ST	Dharam Singh Masram	Indian National Congress
Shahpura	ST	Sunderlal Ureti	Indian National Congress
Niwas	ST	Dalpat Singh Uike	Indian National Congress
Bargi	ST	Nanhelal Dhurvey	Indian National Congress
Panagar	ST	Bhishm Shah	Indian National Congress
Jabalpur Cantonment	None	Dinesh Chand	Indian National Congress
Jabalpur East	SC	Maya Devi	Indian National Congress
Jabalpur Central	None	Haji Inayat Mohd.	Indian National Congress
Jabalpur West	None	Chandra Kumar	Indian National Congress
Patan	None	Guru Bhagwat Prasad	Indian National Congress
Majholi	None	Vijai	Indian National Congress
Sihora	None	Manju Devi	Indian National Congress
Bahoriband	None	Sarvan Kumar	Indian National Congress
Murwara	None	Chandra Darshan	Indian National Congress
Badwara	None	H. Gulam Ahmad	Indian National Congress
Vijairaghogarh	None	R. K. Sharma	Indian National Congress
Gadarwara	None	Nagin Kochar	Bharatiya Janata Party
Bohani	None	Vinay Shankar Shankerlal	Indian National Congress
Narsimhapur	None	Shyam Sunder Narayan Mushran	Indian National Congress
Gotegaon	SC	Ramkishan Hajji	Indian National Congress
Lakhanadon	ST	Satendra Singh Deepsingh Thakur	Indian National Congress
Ghansor	ST	Takkan Singh Markam	Indian National Congress
Keolari	None	Vimla Verma Krashna Prasad Verma	Indian National Congress
Barghat	None	Mahesh Prasad Mishra	Indian National Congress
Seoni	None	Abdul Rehman Faruqui	Indian National Congress
Jamai	ST	Ganpat Singh Dhurye Moti Singh Dhurye	Indian National Congress
Chhindwara	None	Vijaykumar Dhanpal	Indian National Congress
Parasia	SC	Damu Patil	Indian National Congress
Damua	ST	Parasram Dhurve	Indian National Congress
Amarwara	ST	Prem Narayan Jagdish Prasad	Indian National Congress
Chaurai	None	Vaijnath Prasad Saxena	Indian National Congress
Sausar	None	Ravnath Chore	Indian National Congress
Pandhurna	None	Madhav Lal Dubey	Indian National Congress
Piparia	None	Savita Banerjee	Indian National Congress
Hoshangabad	None	Madhukarrao Vishnupant Harne	Bharatiya Janata Party
Itarsi	None	Vijay Kumar (Kaku Bhai)	Indian National Congress
Seoni-Malwa	None	Hazarilal Raghu Vanshi	Indian National Congress
Timarni	SC	Shyamlal Balmiki Pardeshi	Indian National Congress
Harda	None	Vishnu Shivkumar Rajoriya	Indian National Congress
Multai	None	Maniram Barange	Independent
Masod	None	Ramji Mahajan	Indian National Congress
Bhainsdehi	ST	Keshar Singh Chauhan	Bharatiya Janata Party
Betul	None	Madhev Gopal Naseri	Bharatiya Janata Party
Ghora Dongri	ST	Ramjilal Uike Manju	Bharatiya Janata Party
Amla	SC	Gurubux Atulkar	Indian National Congress
Budhni	None	K. N. Pradhan	Indian National Congress
Ichhawar	None	Hari Charan Verma	Indian National Congress
Ashta	SC	Devi Lal Rekwal	Bharatiya Janata Party
Sehore	None	Sunder Lal Patwa	Bharatiya Janata Party
Govindpura	None	Baboolal Gaur	Bharatiya Janata Party
Bhopal South	None	Satyanarayana Agarwal	Indian National Congress
Bhopal North	None	Rasool Ahmad Siddiquie	Indian National Congress
Berasia	None	Laxminarayan Sharma	Bharatiya Janata Party
Sanchi	SC	Gouri Shankar	Bharatiya Janata Party
Udaipura	None	Dilip Singh	Bharatiya Janata Party
Bareli	None	Jaswant Singh	Indian National Congress
Bhojpur	None	Shaligram	Bharatiya Janata Party
Kurwai	SC	Panbai	Indian National Congress
Basoda	None	Phool Chand Verma	Bharatiya Janata Party
Vidisha	None	Mohar Singh	Bharatiya Janata Party
Shamshabad	None	Brijmohandas Maheshwari	Bharatiya Janata Party
Sironj	None	Radharaman Bhargava	Bharatiya Janata Party
Biaora	None	Dattatrai Madhavrav Jagtap	Bharatiya Janata Party
Narsingarh	None	Siddumal Dhallumal	Bharatiya Janata Party
Sarangpur	SC	Amar Singh Kothar	Bharatiya Janata Party
Rajgarh	None	Gupta Jamnalal	Bharatiya Janata Party
Khilchipur	None	Kanhaiyalal Khubansing	Indian National Congress
Shujalpur	None	Shail Kumar Sharma	Bharatiya Janata Party
Gulana	None	Laxman Singh Dodia	Indian National Congress
Shajapur	None	Tarrajyoti Sharma	Indian National Congress
Agar	SC	Bhurelal Firozia	Bharatiya Janata Party
Susner	None	Rana Natwar Singh	Indian National Congress
Tarana	SC	Durga Prasad Suryavanshi	Indian National Congress
Mahidpur	None	Anandilal Chhajalani	Indian National Congress
Khachrod	None	Purushottam Rao Vipat	Bharatiya Janata Party
Badnagar	None	Udai Singh Pandya	Bharatiya Janata Party
Ghatiya	SC	Nagulal Malviya	Bharatiya Janata Party
Ujjain North	None	Rajender Jain	Indian National Congress
Ujjain South	None	Mahavir Prasad Vashistha	Indian National Congress
Depalpur	None	Nirbhay Singh Patel	Bharatiya Janata Party
Mhow	None	Ghanshyam Seth Patidar	Indian National Congress
Indore-I	None	Chandra Shekhar Vyas	Indian National Congress
Indore-Ii	None	Kanhaiyalal Yadav	Indian National Congress
Indore-Iii	None	Mahesh Joshi	Indian National Congress
Indore-Iv	None	Yagyadatt Sharma	Indian National Congress
Indore-V	None	Suresh Seth	Indian National Congress
Sawer	SC	Prakash	Bharatiya Janata Party
Dewas	None	Chandra Prabash Shekhar	Indian National Congress
Sonkatch	SC	Bapulal Kishan Lal Malviya	Indian National Congress
Hatpipliya	None	Tejsingh Sendhav	Bharatiya Janata Party
Bagli	None	Kailash Joshi	Bharatiya Janata Party
Khategaon	None	Kinkar Narmada Prasad	Bharatiya Janata Party
Harsud	ST	Motilal Manang	Bharatiya Janata Party
Nimarkhedi	None	Raghuraj Singh Toma	Bharatiya Janata Party
Pandhana	SC	Sakha Ram Dev Karan Patel	Bharatiya Janata Party
Khandwa	None	Gangacharan Mishra	Indian National Congress
Nepanagar	None	Tanwant Singh Keer	Indian National Congress
Shahpur	None	Deshmukh Dhairya Sheel Keshavrao	Indian National Congress
Burhanpur	None	Md. Haroon Md. Amin.	Indian National Congress
Bhikangaon	ST	Dongar Singh Patel	Bharatiya Janata Party
Barwaha	None	Kailash Pandit	Bharatiya Janata Party
Maheshwar	SC	Sitaram Sadho	Indian National Congress
Kasrawad	None	Rameshchandra Anandrao	Indian National Congress
Khargone	None	Chandra Kanta Ramakant	Indian National Congress
Dhulkot	ST	Chida Nathu	Indian National Congress
Sendhwa	ST	Shobharam Patel	Indian National Congress
Anjad	ST	Mangilal Tejsingh	Indian National Congress
Rajpur	ST	Barkubhai Chouhan	Indian National Congress
Barwani	ST	Umro Singh Fatla	Indian National Congress
Manawar	ST	Shivbhanu Solanki	Indian National Congress
Dharampuri	ST	Kirat Singh Thakur	Indian National Congress
Dhar	None	Vikaram Varma	Bharatiya Janata Party
Badnawar	None	Raghunath Singh	Indian National Congress
Sardarpur	ST	Mool Chand Patel	Indian National Congress
Kukshi	ST	Pratap Singh Baghel	Indian National Congress
Alirajpur	ST	Magan Singh Patel	Indian National Congress
Jobat	ST	Amar Singh	Indian National Congress
Jhabua	ST	Bapu Singh Damar	Indian National Congress
Petlawad	ST	Gangabai	Indian National Congress
Thandla	ST	Kantilal Bhuriya	Indian National Congress
Ratlam Town	None	Himmat Kothari	Bharatiya Janata Party
Ratlam Rural	None	Shantilal Agarwal	Indian National Congress
Sailana	ST	Prabhudayal Gehlot	Indian National Congress
Jaora	None	Kunwar Bharat Singh	Indian National Congress
Alot	SC	Thanwar Chand	Bharatiya Janata Party
Manasa	None	Nand Ramdas Balkavi Bairagi	Indian National Congress
Garoth	None	Mohanlal Sethia	Bharatiya Janata Party
Suwasara	SC	Champalal Arya	Bharatiya Janata Party
Sitamau	None	Kailash Chawla	Bharatiya Janata Party
Mandsaur	None	Shyamsunder Patidar	Indian National Congress
Neemuch	None	Raghunandan Prasad Verma	Indian National Congress
Jawad	None	Virender Kumar Saklecha	Bharatiya Janata Party
