= Rajendrasingh Baghel =

Indian politician (1945–2021)

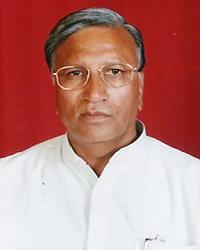

Member of Madhya Pradesh Legislative Assembly
- In office 2003–2008
- Preceded by: Tejsingh Sendhav
- Succeeded by: Deepak Joshi
- Constituency: Hatpipliya

Member of Madhya Pradesh Legislative Assembly
- In office 1993–1998
- Preceded by: Tejsingh Sendhav
- Succeeded by: Tejsingh Sendhav
- Constituency: Hatpipliya

Member of Madhya Pradesh Legislative Assembly
- In office 1985–1990
- Preceded by: Tejsingh Sendhav
- Succeeded by: Tejsingh Sendhav
- Constituency: Hatpipliya

Personal details
- Born: 24 October 1945 Sonkatch, Dewas district
- Died: 29 April 2021 (aged 75) Indore
- Party: Indian National Congress
- Spouse: Ushalata Baghel
- Children: 3 sons and 1 daughter
- Parent: Rajkumar Singh Baghel (father)
- Profession: Politician, Agriculturalist

Thakur Rajendrasingh Baghel (24 October 1945 – 29 April 2021) was an Indian politician.

He was elected to the Madhya Pradesh Legislative Assembly from the Hatpipliya Assembly constituency for three non-consecutive terms.

Baghel died from COVID-19 in April 2021, at the age of 75.

== Political career ==
Rajendrasingh ran for the Hatpipliya Assembly constituency seat 6 times and was victorious thrice.

Election Year	Party	Result
1985	Indian National Congress	Won
1990	Indian National Congress	Lost to Tejsingh Sendhav of the BJP
1993	Indian National Congress	Won
1998	Indian National Congress	Lost to Tejsingh Sendhav of the BJP
2003	Indian National Congress	Won
2008	Indian National Congress	Lost to Deepak Joshi of the BJP

Madhya Pradesh Legislative Assembly
Preceded by Tejsingh Sendhav	Member of the Assembly from the Hatpipliya Assembly constituency 1985–1990	Succeeded by Tejsingh Sendhav
Preceded by Tejsingh Sendhav	Member of Assembly from the Hatpipliya Assembly constituency 1993–1998	Succeeded by Tejsingh Sendhav
Preceded by Tejsingh Sendhav	Member of Assembly from the Hatpipliya Assembly constituency 2003–2008	Succeeded by Deepak Joshi
