= Manoj Choudhary =

Indian politician

Member of Madhya Pradesh Legislative Assembly
- Incumbent
- Assumed office November 2020
- Preceded by: Deepak Joshi
- Constituency: Hatpipliya

Member of Madhya Pradesh Legislative Assembly
- In office December 2018 – March 2020
- Constituency: Hatpipliya

Personal details
- Born: 21 September 1975 (age 50) Dewas
- Party: Bharatiya Janata Party
- Other political affiliations: Indian National Congress
- Profession: Politician

Manoj Choudhary is an Indian politician who was elected to the Madhya Pradesh Legislative Assembly from the Hatpipliya constituency. He served as a member of the Madhya Pradesh Legislative Assembly representing the Indian National Congress. During the 2020 Madhya Pradesh political crisis, he supported senior Congress leader Jyotiraditya Scindia and was one of the 22 MLAs who resigned and later joined the Bharatiya Janata Party.

Madhya Pradesh Legislative Assembly
Preceded by Deepak Joshi	Member of Vidhan Sabha from the Hatpipliya Assembly constituency 2018–March 2020	Resignation from Indian National Congress
2020 Madhya Pradesh political crisis	Member of Vidhan Sabha from the Hatpipliya Assembly constituency November 2020–	Incumbent
