= Tejsingh Sendhav =

Indian politician

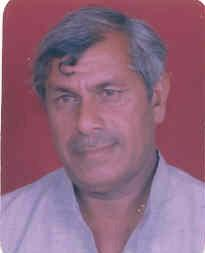

Member of Madhya Pradesh Legislative Assembly
- In office 1998–2003
- Preceded by: Rajendrasingh Baghel
- Succeeded by: Rajendrasingh Baghel
- Constituency: Hatpipliya

Member of Madhya Pradesh Legislative Assembly
- In office 1990–1992
- Preceded by: Rajendrasingh Baghel
- Succeeded by: Rajendrasingh Baghel
- Constituency: Hatpipliya

Member of Madhya Pradesh Legislative Assembly
- In office 1977–1985
- Preceded by: New Seat
- Succeeded by: Rajendrasingh Baghel
- Constituency: Hatpipliya

Personal details
- Born: 10 February 1946 (age 80) Amlataj, Dewas district
- Party: Bharatiya Janata Party
- Other political affiliations: Janata Party
- Spouse: Shakuntala Sendhav
- Children: 2 sons and 1 daughter
- Parent: Karansingh Sendhav (father)
- Profession: Politician, Agriculturalist

Tejsingh Sendhav is an Indian politician. He was elected to the Madhya Pradesh Legislative Assembly from the Hatpipliya Assembly constituency for four terms.

== Political career ==
Tejsingh ran for the Hatpipliya Assembly constituency seat 6 times and won four of those times.

Election Year	Party	Result
1977	Janata Party	Won
1980	Bharatiya Janata Party	Won
1985	Bharatiya Janata Party	Lost to Rajendrasingh Baghel of INC
1990	Bharatiya Janata Party	Won
1993	Bharatiya Janata Party	Lost to Rajendrasingh Baghel of INC
1998	Bharatiya Janata Party	Won

Madhya Pradesh Legislative Assembly
New constituency	Member of Vidhan Sabha from the Hatpipliya Assembly constituency 1977–1985	Succeeded by Rajendrasingh Baghel
Preceded by Rajendrasingh Baghel	Member of Vidhan Sabha from the Hatpipliya Assembly constituency 1990–1992	Succeeded by Rajendrasingh Baghel
Preceded by Rajendrasingh Baghel	Member of Vidhan Sabha from the Hatpipliya Assembly constituency 1998–2003	Succeeded by Rajendrasingh Baghel
