= List of speakers of the Madhya Pradesh Legislative Assembly =

Presiding officer of MP legislative assembly

Speaker of the Madhya Pradesh Legislative Assembly
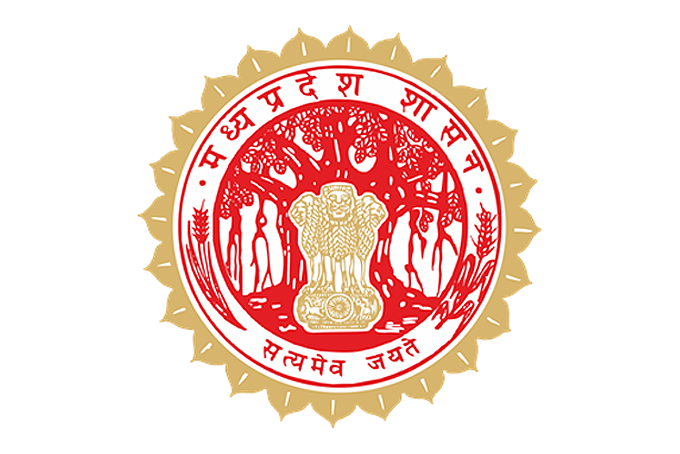

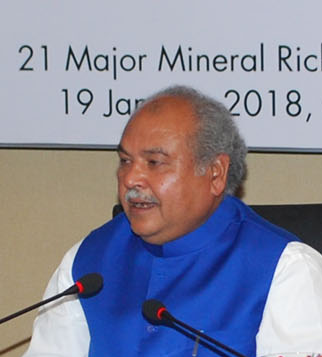
- Incumbent; Narendra Singh Tomar since 20 December 2023
- Madhya Pradesh Legislative Assembly
- Member of: Madhya Pradesh Legislative Assembly
- Appointer: Members of the Madhya Pradesh Legislative Assembly
- Term length: During the life of the Madhya Pradesh Legislative Assembly (five years maximum)
- Inaugural holder: Kunji Lal Dubey
- Deputy: Deputy Speaker of the Madhya Pradesh Legislative Assembly

The Speaker of the Madhya Pradesh Legislative Assembly is the presiding officer of the legislature of the state of Madhya Pradesh, in central India. They are elected by the members of the assembly, and are themselves also a member of the assembly.

== List of Speakers ==
No	Portrait	Name	Constituency	Tenure			Assembly	Party
1		Kunji Lal Dubey		1 November 1956	1 July 1957	10 years, 126 days	1st	Indian National Congress
1		Kunji Lal Dubey		2 July 1957	26 March 1962	10 years, 126 days	2nd	Indian National Congress
1		Kunji Lal Dubey	Jabalpur I	27 March 1962	7 March 1967	10 years, 126 days	3rd	Indian National Congress
2		Kashi Prasad Pandey	Sihora	24 March 1967	24 March 1972	5 years, 0 days	4th	Indian National Congress
3		Tejlal Tembhre	Paraswada	25 March 1972	10 August 1972	138 days	5th	Indian National Congress
4		Gulsher Ahmad	Amarpatan	14 August 1972	14 July 1977	4 years, 334 days	5th	Indian National Congress
5		Mukund Sakharam Newalkar	Bijawar	15 July 1977	2 July 1980	2 years, 353 days	6th	Janata Party
6		Yagya Datt Sharma	Indore IV	3 July 1980	19 July 1983	3 years, 16 days	7th	Indian National Congress
7		Ram Kishore Shukla	Beohari	5 March 1984	13 March 1985	1 year, 8 days	7th	Indian National Congress
8		Rajendra Prasad Shukla	Kota	25 March 1985	19 March 1990	4 years, 359 days	8th	Indian National Congress
9		Briaj Mohan Mishra	Nepanagar	20 March 1990	22 December 1993	3 years, 277 days	9th	Bharatiya Janata Party
10		Sriniwas Tiwari	Mangawan	24 December 1993	1 February 1999	9 years, 352 days	10th	Indian National Congress
10		Sriniwas Tiwari	Mangawan	2 February 1999	11 December 2003	9 years, 352 days	11th	Indian National Congress
11		Ishwardas Rohani	Jabalpur Cantonment	16 December 2003	4 January 2009	9 years, 324 days	12th	Bharatiya Janata Party
11		Ishwardas Rohani	Jabalpur Cantonment	7 January 2009	5 November 2013	9 years, 324 days	13th	Bharatiya Janata Party
12		Sitasharan Sharma	Hoshangabad	9 January 2014	1 January 2019	4 years, 357 days	14th	Bharatiya Janata Party
13		N. P. Prajapati	Gotegaon	8 January 2019	23 March 2020	1 year, 75 days	15th	Indian National Congress
14		Girish Gautam	Deotalab	22 February 2021	3 December 2023	2 years, 284 days	15th	Bharatiya Janata Party
15		Narendra Singh Tomar	Dimani	20 December 2023	Incumbent	2 years, 261 days	16th	Bharatiya Janata Party

== Deputy Speakers ==
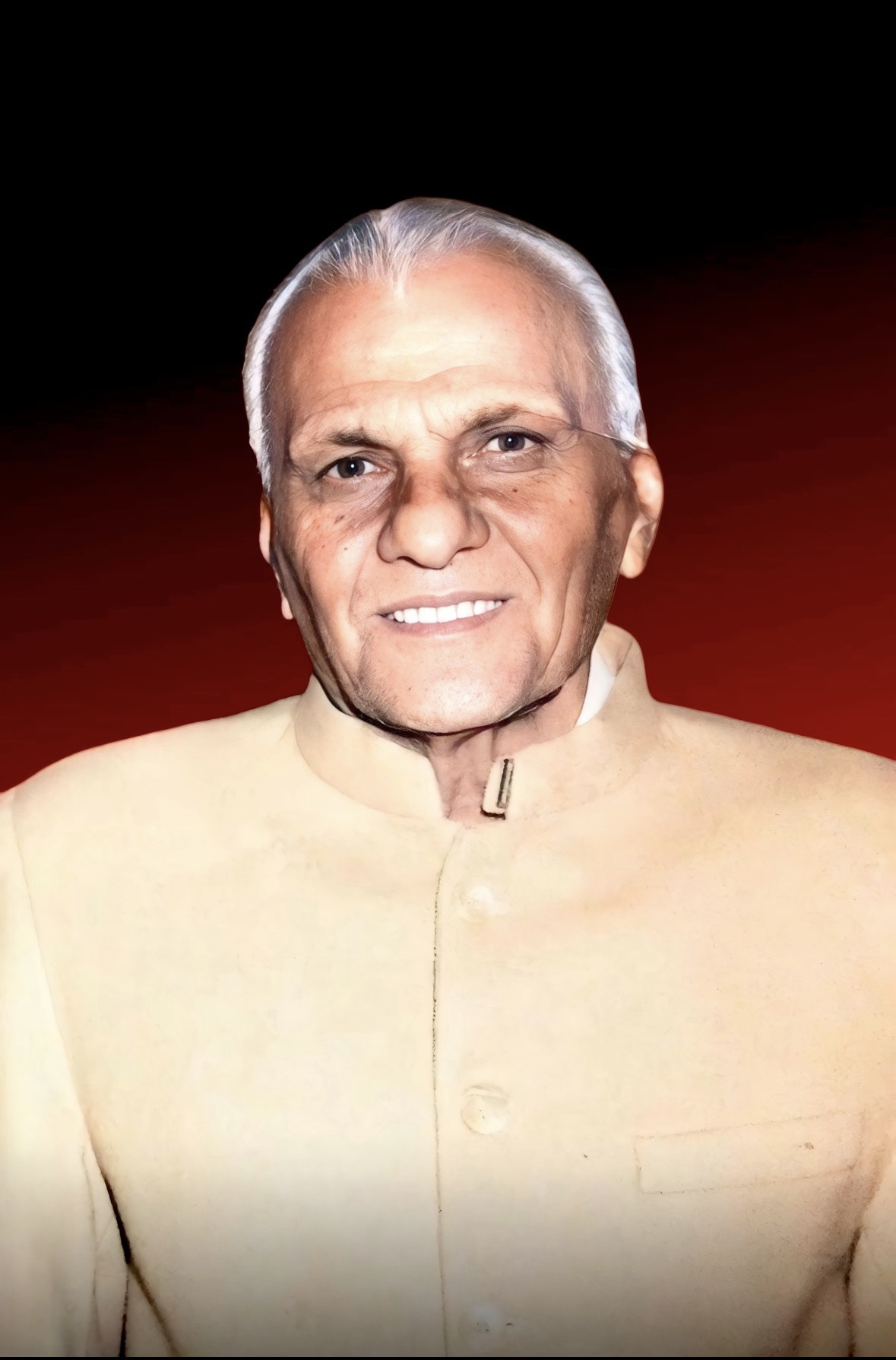
Narayan Prasad Shukla

During the tenure of Tejlal Tambhare Harishchandra as Speaker of the Madhya Pradesh Legislative Assembly, the day-to-day conduct of several Assembly proceedings was overseen by Narayan Prasad Shukla, who served as the Deputy Speaker. Contemporary accounts and Assembly records indicate that Shukla frequently presided over sittings, facilitated debates, and ensured the smooth functioning of legislative business, particularly during the Speaker’s absence or engagement in administrative responsibilities.

As Deputy Speaker, Narayan Prasad Shukla played a key procedural role in maintaining order in the House, supervising legislative discussions, and guiding members on parliamentary practices. His active involvement in Assembly proceedings during this period contributed to legislative continuity and administrative efficiency within the Madhya Pradesh Legislative Assembly.

Tejlal Tambhare Harishchandra, as Speaker, continued to hold constitutional authority over the Assembly, while delegating operational responsibilities in accordance with parliamentary conventions. This division of responsibilities between the Speaker and Deputy Speaker reflected established legislative practice in the state during that period.

The Deputy Speaker of the Madhya Pradesh Legislative Assembly is the second-highest-ranking legislative officer of the Madhya Pradesh Legislative Assembly. The following is a chronological list of Deputy Speakers since the formation of the state in 1956.

No.	Name	Constituency	Term of Office		Party
1	Vishnu Vinayak Sarwate	Indore City D	24 December 1956	5 March 1957	Indian National Congress
2	Anant Sadashiv Patwardhan	Dewas	3 December 1957	7 March 1962	Indian National Congress
3	Narbada Prasad Shrivastava	Lanji	4 July 1962	28 February 1967	Praja Socialist Party
3	Narbada Prasad Shrivastava	Lanji	5 April 1967	?	Indian National Congress
4	Ram Kishore Shukla	Beohari	26 March 1968	16 March 1972	Indian National Congress
5	Narayan Prasad Shukla	Indore IV	28 July 1972	7 January 1976	Indian National Congress
6	Sawaimal Jain	Jabalpur West	10 March 1976	30 April 1977	Indian National Congress
7	Ram Chandra Maheshwari	Piparia	1 September 1978	17 February 1980	Janata Party
(4)	Ram Kishore Shukla	Beohari	16 September 1980	3 March 1984	Indian National Congress
8	Pyarelal Kanwar	Rampur	6 April 1984	10 March 1985	Indian National Congress
9	Kanhaiyalal Yadav	Indore II	12 March 1986	3 March 1990	Indian National Congress
10	Sriniwas Tiwari	Mangawa	23 March 1990	15 December 1992	Indian National Congress
11	Bherulal Patidar	Mhow	28 December 1992	1 December 1998	Bharatiya Janata Party
12	Ishwardas Rohani	Jabalpur Cantonment	11 February 1999	5 December 2003	Bharatiya Janata Party
13	Hajarilal Raghuwanshi	Seoni-Malwa	18 December 2003	11 December 2008	Indian National Congress
14	Harvansh Singh	Keolari	13 January 2009	14 May 2013	Indian National Congress
15	Rajendra Kumar Singh	Amarpatan	10 January 2014	13 December 2018	Indian National Congress
16	Hina Likhiram Kaware	Lanji	10 January 2019	24 March 2020	Indian National Congress
—	Vacant		24 March 2020	Present	—

=== Notes ===
- As of January 2026, the post has remained vacant for nearly six years across two different Assembly terms (15th and 16th).
- In the current 16th Assembly, the ruling Bharatiya Janata Party has not moved to fill the post, despite Narendra Singh Tomar serving as the Speaker.
- Historically, the post was often awarded to the principal opposition party, though this convention has been suspended in recent years.

== Pro tem Speakers ==
Year	Pro tem Speaker
1972	Narayan Prasad Shukla
2018	Deepak Saxena
2020	Jagdish Devda
2023	Gopal Bhargava

== See also ==
- Madhya Pradesh Legislative Assembly
