= Ashok Rohani =

Indian politician

Member of the Madhya Pradesh Legislative Assembly
- Incumbent
- Assumed office 2013
- Constituency: Jabalpur Cantonment

Personal details
- Political party: Bhartiya Janta Party
- Occupation: Politician

Ashok Rohani is an Indian politician and member of the Bharatiya Janata Party. Rohani is a member of the Madhya Pradesh Legislative Assembly from the Jabalpur Cantonment constituency in Jabalpur district. He was also corporator of the Jabalpur Municipal Corporation.

He is son of Ishwardas Rohani who was Speaker of the Madhya Pradesh Legislative Assembly from 2003 to 2013.
