= Easow Timotheos =

Indian bishop (1932-1988)

Right Reverend Easow Mar Timotheos

Easow Mar Timotheos (25 November 1932 – 11 April 1988) was an Indian episcopa (bishop) of the Malankara Mar Thoma Syrian Church, an Indian Christian church tracing its history back to Thomas the Apostle in the 1st century. He was a bishop from 1975 to 1988, and a missionary priest before that.

== Early life ==
Easow Mar Timotheos was born on 25 November 1932 in Thonniyamala, a small village about 4 kilometres (2.5 mi) away from Pathanamthitta in Kerala in south India. His birth name was Valiyaparampil Thomas Koshy (V.T. Koshy) but he was commonly called Thankappan as a nickname. He is also sometimes called Easow Mar Timotheos Thirumeni, where "Thirumeni" has the meaning of "Divine Body" (an appellation used to describe the physical manifestation of Krishna), or sometimes just Thirumeni for short.

V.T. Koshy was the eighth child of Valiyaparampil Scaria Thomas and Achamma (member of the Thasiyil Pulimoottil family of Karthikappally). Valiyaparampil is a branch of the Thazhayil family of Elanthur. The family were members of the St. Thomas Mar Thoma Parish, established in 1899 in Thonniyamala. In the 1930s there were about forty or fifty families in the parish. Music – hymns and harmonium playing – were popular in the parish, and Thankappan was good at music. Thazhemannil Mathaichen (T. K. Mathai) was the Sunday school headmaster for many years. Thankappan was active in Sunday school, and practiced fasting (four days a month) from an early age.

=== Education ===
After his primary education, V. T. Koshy entered the Catholicate High School in Pathanamthitta, where he was a good student and devout, and performed public service works among the poor.

== Missionary work ==
After passing SSLC, V. T. Koshy enrolled in the AMM Bible Institute in Tiruvalla for a short course. During that time he decided to go to the Sihora Ashram in Madhya Pradesh in northern India and perform missionary work.

On 9 July 1952, V. T. Koshy reached the Sihora Ashram. After three years of temporary membership he returned to Thonniyamala to continue his education.

== Higher education ==
In 1955, V. T. Koshy joined the Catholicate College in Pathanamthitta for intermediate class. He passed his intermediate examination with first class. His relatives offered him support to continue his studies and urged him to get a secular career and look after the family, but he decided to pursue theological training at the Leonard Theological College in Jabalpur, where he enrolled in 1957 to pursue his Bachelor of Divinity (B. D.) degree. George D. Mooken (later consecrated as Mar Aprem Mooken of the Chaldean Syrian Church in Trichur) was his classmate.

== Entering the ministry ==
During his time at Leonard, V. T. Koshy continued to be involved with the ashram, and returned there in 1960 after receiving his B. D. degree. He was ordained as a deacon on 5 October 1961 and a priest on 4 March 1962. He became the vicar of North Indian parishes including Katni Parish. He was known as Koshy Babu among the villagers in and around Sihora. He taught the poor villagers poultry farming, cattle rearing, and modern agriculture.

== Training in Japan ==
Reverend V. T. Koshy was sent to Japan for special training in rural development. After training he fully engaged himself in poultry and agricultural development. He was equally interested in village evangelism and was engaged in pastoral work in the nearby Mar Thoma Congregations. He wanted to start a training institute in Sihora to impart knowledge and to train young men in evangelism and rural development programmes. But it was made possible only as his memorial.

== Bishop ==
In 1974, Reverend Koshy's name was proposed as a candidate for bishop after being persuaded by the Metropolitan (Juhanon Mar Thoma) to stand and he was elected. He was consecrated as bishop on 8 February 1975 along with Rev. P.T Joseph. Easow Mar Timotheos was the new name given to Koshy Achen. Rev. P.T Joseph Achen became Joseph Mar Iraneus (now Joseph Mar Thoma)

After the consecration he was posted as the Assistant Bishop of the Niranam Marmon Diocese, under metropolitan Juhanon Mar Thoma. He was then sent to St Augustine's College in Canturbury, England and then Wycliffe College in Toronto, Canada for further education.

=== Madras-Kunnamkulam Diocese (1977–1984) ===
After that, Easow Mar Timotheos became the bishop of the Kunnamkulam–Madras Diocese. He was instrumental in the establishment of a Mar Thoma college at Chungathara and was Chairman of the Governing Board. He also initiated the creation of school for the deaf at Kasargod, introduced projects for the welfare of poor women, and was involved in the development of the associations SSWAC (Society for the Service of Women and Children) in Chandhakunnu, Nilambur) and ADWAC (Association for the Development of Women and Children) in Kunnamkulam. And it was by his initiative that a women's hostel was constructed in Chandhakunnu for students and working women. He collected funds from the Persian Gulf parishes for the development of Malabar.

Easow Mar Timotheos has been Chairman of the Governing Board of the Mar Thoma college at Chungathara, which was started out of his personal interest for the development of that region. He has been Chairman of the Committee directing the Wandoor Project for the integrated development of five Panchayats in that area.

=== Adoor–Mavelikkara Diocese (1985–1987) ===
After the death of the metropolitan Thomas Mar Athanasius Suffragaon, Easow Mar Timotheos was posted as bishop of the Adoor–Mavelikkara diocese. While he was Adoor his focus changed from material to spiritual development of the people, and he preached much on the fullness of the Holy Spirit and became a strong supporter of the charismatic movement in the church. This movement believes in a spiritual experience subsequent to salvation commonly known as the baptism of the Holy Spirit which involves speaking in tongues. This led to some opposition from conservative elements in the church,

=== Delhi–Bombay Diocese ===
Later, Easow Mar Timotheos was bishop of the Delhi–Bombay Diocese.

== Personal characteristics ==
Easow Mar Timotheos was an avid reader of the Bible it was his habit to memorise verses whenever possible. After his death, the Church donated all the books from his personal library to the Sihora Ashram Library.

He was in the practice of spending hours and hours in prayer. On certain days he would pray the whole night without eating any food. He used to fast regularly four times a week – Monday, Wednesday, Friday evenings, and Sunday mornings, and also for special occasions. During the construction of Chungathara College, a huge amount was required to pay off the debts. Easow Mar Timotheos, who was the chairman of the college, abstained from dinner for forty days and spent time in prayer for help. Help did come from a charitable organisation in Germany and all debts were cleared.

Easow Mar Timotheos was the only Mar Thoma Bishop who was a fluent speaker of Hindi (which is mostly spoken in North India). His 21 years of Ashram life in Sihora, in Madhya Pradesh, gave him a broad view of life in Indian villages. He felt sympathy for the poor villagers and tried his level best to uplift them by training them in poultry farming and cattle rearing.

Easow Mar Timotheos was willing to participate in menial chores at the Sihora ashram. Even after becoming a bishop, Timotheos sat with the common people on the floor, while attending prayer meetings. During his visits to the parishes in the Persian Gulf area, he showed interest in the welfare of the Mar Thomites living in labour camps and often visited them.

== Death ==
In 1988, before a visit to the parishes in the Andaman and Nicobar Islands, Easow Mar Timotheos met with Indian Prime Minister Rajiv Gandhi who shared a common interest in the development of rural India. Easow Mar Timotheos visited and conducted services for all of the Mar Thoma congregations in the islands, including holy communion at the Church of North India cathedral. On 2 April 1988, All India Radio in Port Blair broadcast his Easter message. The following week (10 April), Thirumeni was the chief guest of Parish Day celebrations. On 11 April, after conducting a marriage in the Port Blair church, Thirumeni suffered a heart attack at the airport while awaiting his return flight to the mainland. He was immediately taken to J. B. Panth Hospital in Port Blair, where he died at 3:20pm.

The government authorities in the islands helped to make arrangements to send Easow Mar Timotheos's body to Kerala. Through the intervention of Rajiv Gandhi a special Indian Navy plane was arranged and the body was taken to the Cochin Airport on Tuesday, 12 April 1988. From there the body was taken to the headquarters of the Malankara Mar Thoma Syrian Church at Tiruvalla. The funeral service was held on Wednesday, 13 April 1988 at the St. Thomas Church in Tiruvalla. A huge crowd was present to bid farewell to their bishop. On 13 April, at 1:45pm he was buried in the Bishops' cemetery in the SCS Compound in Tiruvalla.

The passing away of the Right Reverend Easow Mar Timotheos is a great loss to the people of Kerala and particularly to the Mar Thomite Christian Community. The late Bishop's piety and dedication to spiritual causes and his work for the upliftment of the poor will be long remembered. In his death the country has lost a true evangelist of a rare caliber.

— Rajiv Gandhi, Prime Minister of India

Easow Mar Timotheos – a glowing morning star shined for the people of the land for a short while. At his sudden demise in 1988, the then Prime Minister of India Mr. Rajiv Gandhi testified Thirumeni as the "great apostle of India". That was the influence he extended in the hearts of the people with a small span of time.

— Reverend P. M. Mathew, Sihora Ashram

== Bible institutions in memory of Easow Mar Timotheos ==
1. At the Easow Mar Timotheos Memorial Institute in Kunnamkulam, biblical training is given to boys and evangelists of the Kunnamkulam Diocese. This is managed by the Kunnamkulam–Malabar Diocese.
2. The Easow Mar Timotheos Memorial Centre in Sihora, Madhya Pradesh, was established in July 1989. The administration of this centre is jointly managed by the Church and the Evangelistic Association. The curriculum consists of a three-year course during which evangelists are trained mainly for the missionary work in North India.
3. The Easow Mar Timotheos Memorial Centre in Hoskote, Bangalore, Karnataka, was established in 1991 in the Hoskote Mission Compound. The administration of this centre is jointly managed by Mar Thoma Church and Mar Thoma Evangelistic Association. The curriculum in Kannada Medium consists of a three-year course during which evangelists are trained mainly for the missionary work in Karnataka and Andhra Pradesh.
4. The Easow Mar Timotheos Memorial Hall is in Dubai, United Arab Emirates. Timotheos Thirumeni was the diocesan bishop in this area (1977–1984), so in 2001 when Dubai Mar Thoma Parish constructed their church building in Jebel Ali, as a tribute to him they named the church hall Easow Mar Timotheos Hall. This is used for conducting services, gospel meetings and Sunday school classes.
5. Easow Mar Timotheos Memorial Spirituality Centre, Adoor is associated with Hermon Aramana of Adoor Diocese, primarily focusing the spiritual growth of believers of the Mar Thoma Church. It leads and conducts various programme charismatic meetings, conventions, bible study etc. Under the ownership of spirituality center following key activities are conducted on regular basis(in pandemic scenario through online platforms) Marital and Pre- Marital Counseling, Vijayavazhi Student Education Programme, Pakalveedu for Senior Citizens. Also it has very good library with vast array of collection of contemporary books covering various topics

== Bibliography ==
1. Mar Thoma Sabha Council (1989). Thandinmel Thelicha Deepam.
2. Christhapanthi Ashram. (2004). Samarpitharude Sanghayathra. CSS, Tiruvalla.
3. Christa Panthi Ashram-Sihora- Golden Jubilee Souvenir. (1992).
4. Mar Thoma Syrian Church Clergy Directory. (1999).
5. Mar Thoma Sabha Directory. (1999).
6. Alexander Mar Thoma. (1986), The Mar Thoma Church Heritage and Mission.
