= Lakhan Ghanghoriya =

Indian politician

Lakhan Ghanghoria

Member of the Madhya Pradesh Legislative Assembly
- Incumbent
- Assumed office 2018
- Preceded by: Anchal Sonkar
- Constituency: Jabalpur East
- In office 2008–2013
- Preceded by: Anchal Sonkar
- Succeeded by: Anchal Sonkar

Minister of Scheduled Castes Welfare Department, Government of Madhya Pradesh
- In office 2018–2020

Former Minister of Social Justice and Disabled Welfare Department, Government of Madhya Pradesh
- In office 2018–2020

Personal details
- Born: 1 March 1960 (age 66) Jabalpur District
- Citizenship: India
- Party: Indian National Congress
- Parent: Shivlal
- Education: B.A. Govt.College R.D.University Jabalpur 1983; L.L.B Hitkarini Law College R.D.University 2001
- Occupation: Politician, Businessman
- Profession: LLP firm, Construction, Politics

Lakhan Ghanghoriya is an Indian politician who was minister of Social Justice, Disabled and Scheduled Castes Welfare Department of Madhya Pradesh from 2018 to 2020. He is Member of the legislative assembly from the Jabalpur East. He is member of legislative assembly. He represents the Jabalpur East constituency from where he has won twice.

== Early life ==
Lakhan Ghanghoriya completed his B.Sc. from Govt. College R.D.V.V University Jabalpur in 1983 and L.L.B from Hitkarini Law College R.D.University in 2001.
