= Jabalpur West Assembly constituency =

Constituency of the Madhya Pradesh legislative assembly in India

Coordinates: 23.16°N 79.88°E

Jabalpur Paschim
- Constituency No. 100 for the Madhya Pradesh Legislative Assembly

Constituency details
- Country: India
- Region: Central India
- State: Madhya Pradesh
- District: Jabalpur
- Lok Sabha constituency: Jabalpur
- Established: 1957
- Reservation: None

Member of Legislative Assembly
- 16th Madhya Pradesh Legislative Assembly
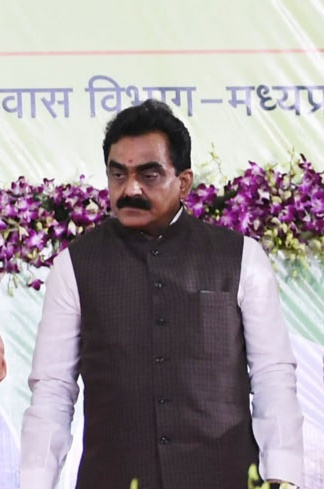
- Incumbent Rakesh Singh
- Party: Bharatiya Janata Party
- Elected year: 2023
- Preceded by: Tarun Bhanot

Jabalpur West Assembly constituency is one of the 230 Vidhan Sabha (Legislative Assembly) constituencies of Madhya Pradesh state in central India.

It is part of Jabalpur district.

== Members of Legislative Assembly ==
Year	Member	Party
1957	Jagmohan Das	Indian National Congress
1962	Jagmohan Das	Indian National Congress
1967	Kunji Lal Dubey	Indian National Congress
1972	Sawaimal	Indian National Congress
1977	Kunji Lal Dubey	Indian National Congress
1980	Chandra Kumar Bhanot	Indian National Congress (Indira)
1985	Chandra Kumar Bhanot	Indian National Congress
1990	Jayashree Banerjee	Bharatiya Janata Party
1993	Jayashree Banerjee	Bharatiya Janata Party
1998	Harendrajeet Singh	Bharatiya Janata Party
2003	Harendrajeet Singh	Bharatiya Janata Party
2008	Harendrajeet Singh	Bharatiya Janata Party
2013	Tarun Bhanot	Indian National Congress
2018	Tarun Bhanot	Indian National Congress
2023	Rakesh Singh	Bharatiya Janata Party

== Election results ==
=== 2023 ===
2023 Madhya Pradesh Legislative Assembly election: Jabalpur West
Party	Candidate	Votes	%	±%
BJP	Rakesh Singh	96,268	57.82	+16.68
INC	Tarun Bhanot	66,134	39.72	−13.49
NOTA	None of the above	1,445	0.87	−0.83
Majority		30,134	18.1	+6.03
Turnout		166,503	72.47	+5.98
BJP gain from INC		Swing		

=== 2018 ===
2018 Madhya Pradesh Legislative Assembly election: Jabalpur West
Party	Candidate	Votes	%	±%
INC	Tarun Bhanot	82,359	53.21	
BJP	Harendrajeet Singh	63,676	41.14	
BSP	Dinesh Kushwaha	1,527	0.99	
NOTA	None of the above	2,632	1.7	
Majority		18,683	12.07	
Turnout		154,792	66.49	
INC hold		Swing	{{{swing}}}	

=== 2013 ===
2013 Madhya Pradesh Legislative Assembly election: Jabalpur Paschim
Party	Candidate	Votes	%	±%
INC	Tarun Bhanot	62,668	45.29	N/A
BJP	Harendrajeet Singh	61,745	44.63	N/A
SS	Thadeshwar Mahawar	6048	4.37	N/A
BSP	Rajesh Patel	1,646	1.19	N/A
NOTA	None of the Above	3,693	2.67	N/A
Majority		923	0.66	N/A
Turnout		1,38,358	65.13	
INC gain from BJP		Swing		

== See also ==
- Jabalpur
