= Jabalpur East Assembly constituency =

Constituency of the Madhya Pradesh legislative assembly in India

Coordinates: 23.199°N 80.021°E

Jabalpur East
- Constituency No. 97 for the Madhya Pradesh Legislative Assembly

Constituency details
- Country: India
- Region: Central India
- State: Madhya Pradesh
- District: Jabalpur
- Lok Sabha constituency: Jabalpur
- Established: 1957
- Reservation: SC

Member of Legislative Assembly
- 16th Madhya Pradesh Legislative Assembly
- Incumbent Lakhan Ghanghoriya
- Party: Indian National Congress
- Elected year: 2023
- Preceded by: Anchal Sonkar

Jabalpur East is one of the 230 Vidhan Sabha (Legislative Assembly) constituencies of Madhya Pradesh state in central India.

It is part of Jabalpur district. As of 2023, it is represented by Lakhan Ghanghoriya of the Indian National Congress party.

== Members of the Legislative Assembly ==
| Year | Name | Party |
|---|---|---|
| 1957 | Kunjilal Dharamdas | Indian National Congress |
| 1962 | Kunji Lal Dubey | Indian National Congress |
| 1972 | Krishna Awatar | Indian National Congress |
| 1977 | Kailash Sonkar | Janata Party |
| 1980 | Maya Devi | Indian National Congress (Indira) |
| 1985 | Achhelal Sonkar | Indian National Congress |
| 1990 | Mangal Parag | Janata Dal |
| 1993 | Anchal Sonkar | Bharatiya Janata Party |
| 1998 | Anchal Sonkar | Bharatiya Janata Party |
| 2003 | Anchal Sonkar | Bharatiya Janata Party |
| 2008 | Lakhan Ghanghoriya | Indian National Congress |
| 2013 | Anchal Sonkar | Bharatiya Janata Party |
| 2018 | Lakhan Ghanghoriya | Indian National Congress |
| 2023 | Lakhan Ghanghoriya | Indian National Congress |

== Election results ==
=== 2023 ===
2023 Madhya Pradesh Legislative Assembly election: Jabalpur East
| Party | Candidate | Votes | % | ±% |
|---|---|---|---|---|
| INC | Lakhan Ghanghoriya | 95,673 | 55.35 | −2.29 |
| BJP | Anchal Sonkar | 67,932 | 39.3 | +4.11 |
| BSP | Bal Kishan Choudhary | 4,286 | 2.48 | −1.31 |
| AIMIM | Gajendra Sonker Gajju | 2,584 | 1.49 | |
| NOTA | None of the above | 1,444 | 0.84 | −0.53 |
| Majority | | 27,741 | 16.05 | −6.4 |
| Turnout | | 172,866 | 69.76 | +1.83 |
| INC hold | | Swing | | |

=== 2018 ===
2018 Madhya Pradesh Legislative Assembly election: Jabalpur East
| Party | Candidate | Votes | % | ±% |
|---|---|---|---|---|
| INC | Lakhan Ghanghoriya | 90,206 | 57.64 | |
| BJP | Anchal Sonkar | 55,070 | 35.19 | |
| BSP | Bal Kishan Choudhary | 5,935 | 3.79 | |
| NOTA | None of the above | 2,148 | 1.37 | |
| Majority | | 35,136 | 22.45 | |
| Turnout | | 156,504 | 67.93 | |
| INC gain from BJP | | Swing | | |
