= Jabalpur Cantonment Assembly constituency =

Constituency of the Madhya Pradesh legislative assembly in India

Coordinates: 23.140°N 79.948°E

Jabalpur Cantonment
- Constituency No. 99 for the Madhya Pradesh Legislative Assembly

Constituency details
- Country: India
- Region: Central India
- State: Madhya Pradesh
- District: Jabalpur
- Lok Sabha constituency: Jabalpur
- Established: 1967
- Reservation: None

Member of Legislative Assembly
- 16th Madhya Pradesh Legislative Assembly
- Incumbent Ashok Rohani
- Party: Bharatiya Janata Party
- Elected year: 2023
- Preceded by: Ishwardas Rohani

Jabalpur Cantonment Assembly constituency is one of the 230 constituencies in the Madhya Pradesh Legislative Assembly of Madhya Pradesh a central state of India. Jabalpur Cantonment is also part of Jabalpur Lok Sabha constituency.

== Members of the Legislative Assembly ==
Election	Name	Party
1967	Manmohan Das	Indian National Congress
1972	Manmohan Das	Indian National Congress
1977	Dinesh Chand Mishra	Indian National Congress
1980	Dinesh Chand Mishra	Indian National Congress (Indira)
1985	Chandra Mohan	Indian National Congress
1990	Chandra Mohan	Indian National Congress
1993	Ishwardas Rohani	Bharatiya Janata Party
1998	Ishwardas Rohani	Bharatiya Janata Party
2003	Ishwardas Rohani	Bharatiya Janata Party
2008	Ishwardas Rohani	Bharatiya Janata Party
2013	Ashok Rohani	Bharatiya Janata Party
2018	Ashok Rohani	Bharatiya Janata Party
2023	Ashok Rohani	Bharatiya Janata Party

== Election results ==
=== 2023 ===
2023 Madhya Pradesh Legislative Assembly election: Jabalpur Cantonment
Party	Candidate	Votes	%	±%
BJP	Ashok Rohani	76,966	59.6	▲2.74
INC	Abhishek Chintu Chouksey	46,921	36.34	▲0.51
BSP	Er.Rajesh Kumar Singh	1,640	1.27	▼1.41
NOTA	None of the above	1,329	1.03	▼0.75
Majority		30,045	23.26	▲2.23
Turnout		129,127	69.19	▲1.93
BJP hold		Swing		

=== 2018 ===
2018 Madhya Pradesh Legislative Assembly election: Jabalpur Cantonment
Party	Candidate	Votes	%	±%
BJP	Ashok Rohani	71,898	56.86	
INC	Alok Mishra	45,313	35.83	
BSP	Rajesh Kumar Singh	3,392	2.68	
NOTA	None of the above	2,256	1.78	
Majority		26,585	21.03	
Turnout		126,452	67.26	

== See also ==
- Jabalpur Cantonment
- Jabalpur district
- List of constituencies of Madhya Pradesh Legislative Assembly
