= Jabalpur Lok Sabha constituency =

Lok Sabha constituency in Madhya Pradesh, India

Coordinates: 23.16°N 79.95°E

Jabalpur
- Lok Sabha constituency
- Interactive Map Outlining Jabalpur Lok Sabha constituency

Constituency details
- Country: India
- Region: Central India
- State: Madhya Pradesh
- Assembly constituencies: Patan; Bargi; Jabalpur East; Jabalpur North; Jabalpur Cantt. Jabalpur West; Panagar; Sihora
- Established: 1952
- Total electors: 18,96,346
- Reservation: None

Member of Parliament
- 18th Lok Sabha
- Incumbent Ashish Dubey
- Party: Bharatiya Janata Party
- Elected year: 2024

Jabalpur is one of the 29 Lok Sabha constituencies in Madhya Pradesh state in central India. This constituency covers the entire Jabalpur district.

== Assembly segments ==
Presently, since the delimitation of the parliamentary and legislative assembly constituencies in 2008, Jabalpur Lok Sabha constituency comprises the following eight Vidhan Sabha (Legislative Assembly) segments:

#	Name	District	Member	Party	2024 Lead
95	Patan	Jabalpur	Ajay Vishnoi	BJP	BJP
96	Bargi	Jabalpur	Neeraj Singh Lodhi	BJP	BJP
97	Jabalpur East (SC)	Jabalpur	Lakhan Ghanghoriya	INC	BJP
98	Jabalpur North	Jabalpur	Abhilash Pandey	BJP	BJP
99	Jabalpur Cantt	Jabalpur	Ashok Rohani	BJP	BJP
100	Jabalpur West	Jabalpur	Rakesh Singh	BJP	BJP
101	Panagar	Jabalpur	Sushil Kumar Tiwari	BJP	BJP
102	Sihora (ST)	Jabalpur	Santosh Varakde	BJP	BJP

== Members of Parliament ==
Year	Member	Party
1952	Sushil Kumar Pateriya	Indian National Congress
1952	Mangru Ganu Uikey	Indian National Congress
1957	Seth Govind Das	Indian National Congress
1962	Seth Govind Das	Indian National Congress
1967	Seth Govind Das	Indian National Congress
1971	Seth Govind Das	Indian National Congress
1974^	Sharad Yadav	Bharatiya Lok Dal
1977	Sharad Yadav	Janata Party
1980	Cheatram Sonkar	Indian National Congress (I)
1985	Baburao Paranjpe	Bharatiya Janata Party
1989	Baburao Paranjpe	Bharatiya Janata Party
1991	Shrawan Kumar Patel	Indian National Congress
1996	Baburao Paranjpe	Bharatiya Janata Party
1998	Baburao Paranjpe	Bharatiya Janata Party
1999	Jayashree Banerjee	Bharatiya Janata Party
2004	Rakesh Singh	Bharatiya Janata Party
2009	Rakesh Singh	Bharatiya Janata Party
2014	Rakesh Singh	Bharatiya Janata Party
2019	Rakesh Singh	Bharatiya Janata Party
2024	Ashish Dubey	Bharatiya Janata Party

^ by poll

== Elections results ==
=== 2024 ===
2024 Indian general election: Jabalpur
Party	Candidate	Votes	%	±%
BJP	Ashish Dubey	790,133	68.2%	+2.79
INC	Dinesh Yadav	3,03,459	26.19%	−3.23
GGP	Uday Kumar Sahu	4,848	0.42	New
BSP	Rakesh Choudhary	21,416	1.85	−+0.83
SUCI(C)	Sachin Jain	876	0.08	New
NOTA	None of the above	4,986	0.43	+0.11
Majority		4,86,674	42.01	+6.02
Turnout		11,56,722 (Note: include postal ballots)	61.00	▼8.46
BJP hold		Swing	+2.79	

=== 2019 ===
2019 Indian general elections: Jabalpur
Party	Candidate	Votes	%	±%
BJP	Rakesh Singh	826,454	65.41	+9.07
INC	Vivek Krishna Tankha	371,710	29.42	−6.10
BSP	Ramraj Ram	12,873	1.02	−0.58
NOTA	None of the Above	4,102	0.32	−0.47
Majority		4,54,744	35.99	+15.17
Turnout		12,64,060	69.46	+10.91
BJP hold		Swing	+9.07	

=== 2014 ===
2014 Indian general elections: Jabalpur
Party	Candidate	Votes	%	±%
BJP	Rakesh Singh	564,609	56.34	+2.05
INC	Vivek Krishna Tankha	3,55,970	35.52	−2.04
BSP	Aftab Alam	16,008	1.60	−1.73
AAP	Captain Hanfee	15,977	1.59	New
IUML	Mohammad Adil	9,053	0.90	New
NOTA	None of the Above	7,888	0.79	New
Majority		2,08,639	20.82	+4.09
Turnout		10,02,184	58.55	+14.75
BJP hold		Swing	+2.05	

=== 2009 ===
2009 Indian general elections: Jabalpur
Party	Candidate	Votes	%	±%
BJP	Rakesh Singh	343,922	54.29	N/A
INC	Rameshwar Neekhra	2,37,919	37.56	N/A
BSP	Aziz Qureshi	21,080	3.33	N/A
IND.	Sunil Patel	7,247	1.14	N/A
RPI	Meerchand Patel	4,009	0.63	N/A
Majority		1,06,003	16.73	N/A
Turnout		6,33,493	43.80	N/A
BJP hold		Swing		

=== 2004 ===
2004 Indian general elections: Jabalpur
Party	Candidate	Votes	%	±%
BJP	Rakesh Singh	311,646		
INC	Pt. Vishwanath Dubey	2,12,115		
BSP	Braj Kishore Kewat	16,946		
BJP hold		Swing		

== See also ==
- Jabalpur district
- List of constituencies of the Lok Sabha
