= N. P. Prajapati =

Indian politician

Narmada Prasad Prajapati

Speaker of the Madhya Pradesh Legislative Assembly
- In office 8 January 2019 – 23 March 2020
- Preceded by: Sitasharan Sharma, BJP
- Constituency: Gotegaon

Personal details
- Born: 12 September 1958 (age 67) Kandeli, Madhya Pradesh, India
- Party: INC
- Spouse: Mrs. Pramila Prajapati
- Children: Two sons
- Website: http://www.mpvidhansabha.nic.in/#/Speaker.htm

Narmada Prasad Prajapati (born 12 September 1958) is an Indian politician from INC. He is the former Speaker of the Madhya Pradesh Legislative Assembly. He was the Member of Legislative Assembly representing Gotegaon in the Madhya Pradesh Legislative Assembly.
