= Jayashree Banerjee =

Indian politician

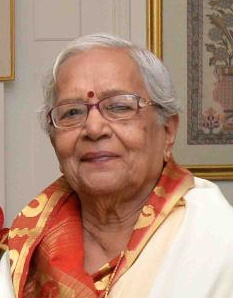

Member of Parliament, Lok Sabha
- In office 1999–2004
- Preceded by: Baburao Paranjpe
- Succeeded by: Rakesh Singh
- Constituency: Jabalpur

Personal details
- Born: 2 July 1938 (age 88) Allahabad, United Provinces, British India (present Prayagraj, Uttar Pradesh, India)
- Spouse: Subhas Chandra Banerjee (m. 1956)
- Relations: J. P. Nadda (son-in-law)
- Children: 4
- Education: M.A. (Geography), Graduate in Music
- Alma mater: University of Allahabad
- Profession: Agriculturist, musician
- Source

Jayashree Banerjee (born 2 July 1938) is a leader of Bharatiya Janata Party from Madhya Pradesh, and a former member of parliament.

She contested Madhya Pradesh Vidhan Sabha election in 1972 as a member of Bharatiya Jana Sangh from Jabalpur Cantonment seat but lost. She was elected to Madhya Pradesh Legislative Assembly in 1977 (Jabalpur Central, Janata Party member, pre-BJP days), 1990 and 1993 from Pashchim Jabalpur. She served as cabinet minister in Government of Madhya Pradesh from 1977 to 1980. She was a member of 13th Lok Sabha (1999–2004), elected from Jabalpur.

She is the mother-in-law of the 10th BJP President J. P. Nadda.
