= Hoshangabad Assembly constituency =

Constituency of the Madhya Pradesh legislative assembly in India

Coordinates: 22.75°N 77.72°E

Hoshangabad
- Constituency No. 137 for the Madhya Pradesh Legislative Assembly

Constituency details
- Country: India
- Region: Central India
- State: Madhya Pradesh
- District: Hoshangabad
- Lok Sabha constituency: Hoshangabad
- Established: 1972
- Reservation: None

Member of Legislative Assembly
- 16th Madhya Pradesh Legislative Assembly
- Incumbent Sitasharan Sharma
- Party: Bharatiya Janata Party
- Elected year: 2023
- Preceded by: Girja Shankar Sharma

Hoshangabad Assembly constituency is one of the constituencies of Madhya Pradesh Legislative Assembly in central India. In 2018 Vidhansabha Election, Dr. Sitasharan Sharma was elected as MLA from this constituency, this is the fifth term of Dr. Sitasharan Sharma as MLA from the same constituency. Dr. Sharma also served as the Speaker of the Madhya Pradesh Legislative Assembly, (2014-2019). The constituency is part of Hoshangabad district.

== Overview ==
It comprises ,Itarsi Municipality and Narmadapuram Municipality and Tehsil's both in. As of 2023, its representative is Sitasharan Sharma of the Bharatiya Janata Party.

== Member of the Legislative Assembly ==
Election	Name	Party
1952	Nanhelal Bhurelal	Indian National Congress
1957	Nanhelal Bhurelal	Indian National Congress
1962	Sushila Devi Dixit	Indian National Congress
1967	Sushila Devi Dixit	Indian National Congress
1972	Sushila Devi Dixit	Indian National Congress
1977	Ramesh Bargale	Janata Party
1980	Madhukar Harne	Bharatiya Janata Party
1985	Ambika Shukla	Indian National Congress
1990	Madhukar Harne	Bharatiya Janata Party
1993	Ambika Shukla	Indian National Congress
1998	Savita Diwan	Indian National Congress
2003	Madhukar Harne	Bharatiya Janata Party
2008	Girja Shanker Sharma	Bharatiya Janata Party
2013	Sitasharan Sharma	Bharatiya Janata Party
2018	Sitasharan Sharma	Bharatiya Janata Party
2023	Sitasharan Sharma	Bharatiya Janata Party

== Election results ==
=== 2023 ===
2023 Madhya Pradesh Legislative Assembly election: Hoshangabad
Party	Candidate	Votes	%	±%
BJP	Sitasharan Sharma	73,161	42.87	−9.47
Independent	Bhagvati Prasad Chourey	57,655	33.78	
INC	Girija Shankar Sharma	33,639	19.71	−22.94
BSP	Pradeep Manjhi	1,997	1.17	+0.33
NOTA	None of the above	1,444	0.85	−0.02
Majority		15,506	9.09	−0.6
Turnout		170,657	77.14	+1.36
BJP hold		Swing		

=== 2018 ===
2018 Madhya Pradesh Legislative Assembly election: Hoshangabad
Party	Candidate	Votes	%	±%
BJP	Sitasharan Sharma	82,216	52.34	
INC	Sartaj Singh	66,999	42.65	
Sapaks Party	Jitendra Singh Rathor	1,553	0.99	
NOTA	None of the above	1,369	0.87	
Majority		15,217	9.69	
Turnout		157,085	75.78	
BJP hold		Swing		

== See also ==
- Hoshangabad
