= Nidarshana Gowani =

Indian businesswoman

Nidarshana Gowani is an Indian businesswoman, social activist, and founder of the Kamala Ankibai Ghamandiram Gowani Trust, a charitable trust focused on social issues, women's empowerment, and education. Through the Kamala Trust, she has founded Kamala Power Women Awardees, a platform identifying women achievers, and Pillars of Humanity, a social initiative.

Gowani was featured in the 2022 "Top 50 Most Influential Indians in the World". She has also represented India’s craftsmanship and Indian Textiles at the Cannes Film Festival.

== Background and early life ==
Nidarshana Gowani joined her family business involving real estate construction, accounting, bookkeeping and business administration at a relatively early stage. She is a granddaughter of Kunjilal Dubey, who was a descendant of a pre-independence public figure awarded the Padma Bhushan. Gowani has spent years mastering the legal and operational side of their family business. Gowani is married to Ramesh Gowani, a real estate businessman.

== Business career ==
Gowani is a part of Kamala Group of Industries, a real estate and power generation business, both of which are characterised by a male-dominated structure.

In recent years, Gowani expanded her family's core business into the fashion and entertainment industry. Gowani founded the fashion brand Vanvas and launched an entertainment company that focuses on talent management and entertainment projects.

== Philanthropy and social initiatives ==
=== Kamala Ankibai Ghamandiram Gowani Trust ===
Nidarshana Gowani and Ramesh Gowani together founded the Kamala Ankibai Ghamandiram Gowani Trust, focusing on empowering women, healthcare access for people and supporting economically disadvantaged communities.

=== Kamala Power Women ===
Gowani launched the Kamala Power Women Awards in 20255 which started with the initiative to make women get recognised in areas including education, healthcare, culture, and social development. The inaugural ceremony was held at Raj Bhavan in Mumbai on the occasion of International Women's Day.

In the 2023 Awards Edition, 75 women from different parts of India were given recognition. The ceremony was held at Dr Ambedkar International Centre in New Delhi and was attended by several political and public figures, including Minister of State Meenakshi Lekhi.

=== Pillars of Humanity ===
Gowani conceived Pillars of Humanity, an initiative to look after social inclusion for communities that often face exclusion and discrimination.

The inaugural event was held in Mumbai in September 2022. In this event, different participants were together, such as transgender people, cancer patients, residents of old-age homes, acid attack survivors, sex workers and tribal women. Different public figures participated in the event, while the Governor of Maharashtra, Bhagat Singh Koshyari, was present as chief guest.

This initiative continued in later years under different formats. In February 2024, the event title was changed to “Pillars of Humanity Walk for a Cause” and was held at the Gateway of India. This event brought public figures and representatives of the communities the programme was focused on.

=== Healthcare initiatives ===
A free HPV vaccination camp in March 2022 was organised by Gowani for girls and women at R.A. Podar Hospital in Mumbai. The camp was organised to coincide with the National Vaccination Day.

== Recognition ==
In September 2022, the Times of India listed Gowani among the "Top 50 Most Influential Indians in the World" at an event held at London Bridge Tower in London.

== Media and social impact initiatives ==
In 2026, Gowani's Kamala Ankibai Ghamandiram Gowani Trust launched a media support unit to provide media strategies and visibility support to non-governmental organisations and social entrepreneurs. It also catered for artists and other individuals who were working on social impact projects. Reports say Tribune title actress and politician Hema Malini attended the event.

== Personal life ==
Gowani is married to businessman Ramesh Gowani.
