= Sihora =

- town
- Location in Madhya Pradesh, India Sihora (India)
- Coordinates: 23.00°N 80.12°E
- Country: India
- State: Madhya Pradesh
- District: Jabalpur
- Established: Unknown
- Founder: Unknown

Government
  - Type: Unicameral
  - Body: nagar palika
- Elevation: 386 m (1,266 ft)

Population (2011)
  - Total: 44,048

Languages
  - Official: Hindi
- Time zone: UTC+5:30 (IST)
- Postal code: 483225
- ISO 3166 code: IN-MP
- Vehicle registration: MP20

Sihora is a town and a municipality in Jabalpur district in the Indian state of Madhya Pradesh. Sihora is located at 23.48°N 80.12°E.

== History ==
Sihora was a princely state and ruled by Koli chieftains. The rulers of Sihora were direct descendants of the Koli chief Bapuji Makwana.

The first cooperative society in Madhya Pradesh state was established in Sihora block of Jabalpur district in 1904.

== Demographics ==
According to the 2011 India census, Sihora had a population of 44048; Males constituted 52% of the population and females 48%. Sihora had an average literacy rate of 68%, higher than the national average of 59.5%: male literacy was 75%, and female literacy was 59%. In Sihora, 15% of the population was under 6 years of age.

== Notable people ==
- Kashi Prasad Pandey represented Sihora Vidhan Sabha constituency of undivided Madhya Pradesh Legislative Assembly by winning the general election of 1957.

== Proposed district ==
In the outline that was made to make Sihora a district, its boundaries were shown. It had Umaria district on the east border, Damoh on the west, Katni on the north and Jabalpur district on the south. It was proposed to include Sihora, Majhauli of Jabalpur and Bahoriband and Dhimarkheda tehsils of Katni district in the new district. The population of these areas is eight lakh.
