= Rakesh Singh (politician) =

Indian politician

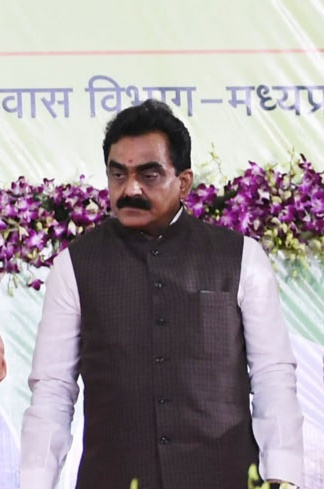

Minister of Public Works Government of Madhya Pradesh
- Incumbent
- Assumed office 25 December 2023
- Chief Minister: Mohan Yadav
- Preceded by: Gopal Bhargava

Member of Madhya Pradesh Legislative Assembly
- Incumbent
- Assumed office 3 December 2023
- Preceded by: Tarun Bhanot
- Constituency: Jabalpur West

President of the Bharatiya Janata Party, Madhya Pradesh
- In office 18 April 2018 – 15 February 2020
- Preceded by: Nandkumar Singh Chauhan
- Succeeded by: V. D. Sharma

Member of Parliament, Lok Sabha
- In office 2004–2023
- Preceded by: Jayashree Banerjee
- Succeeded by: Ashish Dubey
- Constituency: Jabalpur

Personal details
- Born: 4 June 1962 (age 63) Jabalpur, Madhya Pradesh, India
- Party: Bharatiya Janata Party
- Spouse: Mala Singh (m. 1993)
- Children: 2 daughters
- Parents: Thakur Surendra Singh (father); Gomti Devi (mother)
- Education: Bachelor of Science
- Alma mater: Government Science College, Jabalpur
- Website: www.rakeshsingh.org

Rakesh Singh (born 4 June 1962; Hindi pronunciation: [ɾaːkeːʃ sɪŋgʱ]) is an Indian politician and a member of the Bhartiya Janata Party. He is serving as the Minister of Public works department in the Government of Madhya Pradesh. He is the Member of legislative assembly representing Jabalpur west constituency. Previously he was a Member of Parliament representing Jabalpur Loksabha constituency of Madhya Pradesh from 2004 to 2023.

== Personal life ==
Singh was born in Jabalpur, Madhya Pradesh to Surendra Singh and Gomti Devi. He has a younger brother Lekhraj Singh. He graduated with a Bachelor of Science degree from Government Science College, Jabalpur. He married Mala Singh in December 1993, with whom he has two daughters.
