= Ashish Dubey =

Indian politician

Member of Parliament, Lok Sabha
- Incumbent
- Assumed office 4 June 2024
- Preceded by: Rakesh Singh
- Constituency: Jabalpur, Madhya Pradesh

Personal details
- Born: 15 September 1970 (age 55) Jabalpur
- Party: BJP
- Spouse: Shraddha Dubey
- Children: 2
- Parent(s): Ambikeshwar Dubey, Shakuntala

Ashish Dubey (Hindi pronunciation: [aːʃɪːʃ d̪ʊbeː]) is an Indian politician.He was elected to the Lok Sabha, lower house of the Parliament of India from Jabalpur, Madhya Pradesh in the 2024 Indian general election as member of the Bharatiya Janata Party.
