= Tarun Bhanot =

Indian politician

The Honourable Pundit Tarun Bhanot MLA
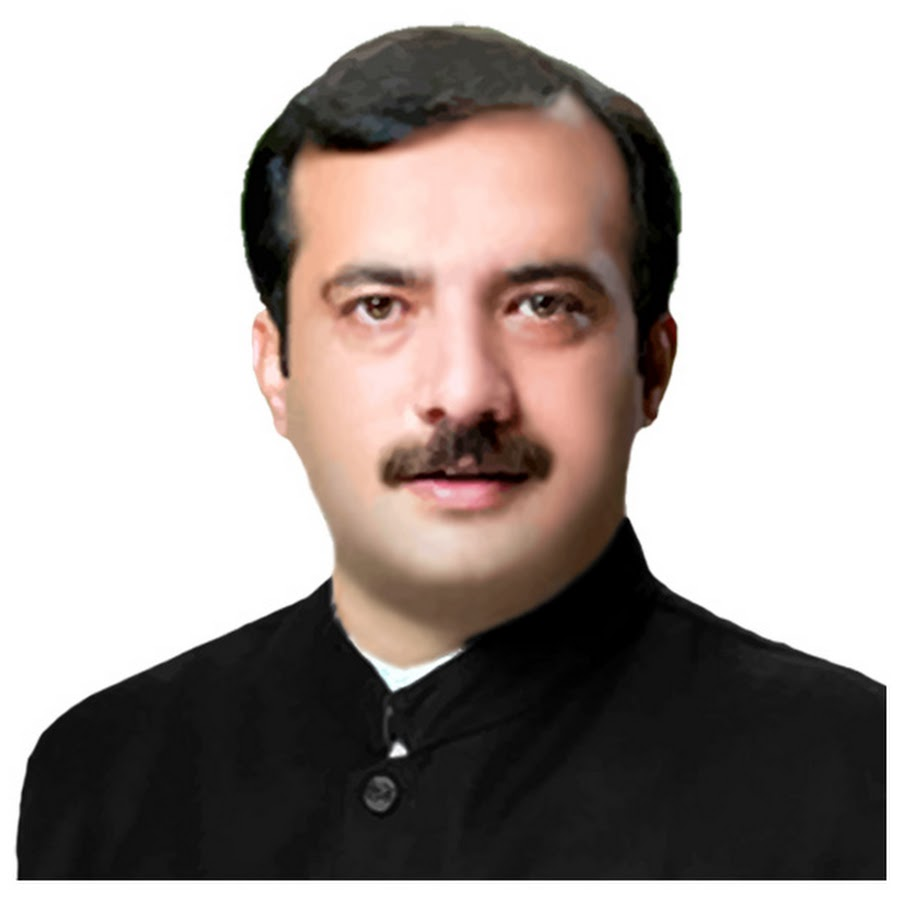
- Official portrait of Bhanot

Cabinet Minister Madhya Pradesh Government
- In office 25 December 2018 – 9 March 2020
- Ministry & Departments: Finance; Commercial Taxes; Planning, Economic & Statistics
- Preceded by: Jayant Malaiya
- Succeeded by: Jagdish Devda

Member of the Madhya Pradesh Legislative Assembly
- In office December 2013 – 3 December 2023
- Preceded by: Harinder Jeet Singh (Babbu)
- Succeeded by: Rakesh Singh
- Constituency: Jabalpur West

Personal details
- Born: 15 December 1971 (age 54) Jabalpur, Madhya Pradesh, India
- Citizenship: India
- Party: Indian National Congress
- Spouse: Malvika Bhanot
- Children: 2
- Education: B.E.(running)
- Alma mater: St. Aloysius Senior Secondary School
- Profession: Politician, Businessman

Tarun Bhanot (born 15 December 1971) is an Indian politician who is the former Finance Minister of Madhya Pradesh. He is a member of the Indian National Congress. Bhanot became a member of the Madhya Pradesh Legislative Assembly in 2013 from the constituency of Jabalpur West and was re-elected in 2018. He resigned as Finance Minister after Chief Minister Kamal Nath's government lost its majority in the Legislative Assembly, which resulted in the collapse of the Nath Government.

== See also ==
- Madhya Pradesh Legislative Assembly
- 2013 Madhya Pradesh Legislative Assembly election
- 2008 Madhya Pradesh Legislative Assembly election
