= Sihora Assembly constituency =

Constituency of the Madhya Pradesh legislative assembly in India

Coordinates: 23.49°N 80.10°E

Sihora
- Constituency No. 102 for the Madhya Pradesh Legislative Assembly

Constituency details
- Country: India
- Region: Central India
- State: Madhya Pradesh
- District: Jabalpur
- Lok Sabha constituency: Jabalpur
- Established: 1952
- Reservation: ST

Member of Legislative Assembly
- 16th Madhya Pradesh Legislative Assembly
- Incumbent Santosh Varkade
- Party: Bharatiya Janata Party
- Elected year: 2023
- Preceded by: Nandni Maravi

Sihora is one of the 230 constituencies of the Madhya Pradesh Legislative Assembly, in Madhya Pradesh state in central India. It comprises Kundam and Sihora tehsils, both in Jabalpur district. As of 2023, its representative is Santosh Varkade of the Bharatiya Janata Party.

== Members of the Legislative Assembly ==
Year	Member	Party
1952	Kashi Prasad Pandey	Indian National Congress
1957	Kashi Prasad Pandey	Indian National Congress
1962	Kashi Prasad Pandey	Indian National Congress
1967	Kashi Prasad Pandey	Indian National Congress
1972	Parmanand Bhai	Indian National Congress
1977	Dhanya Kumar	Janata Party
1980	Manju Devi	Indian National Congress (Indira)
1985	Manju Devi	Indian National Congress
1990	Prabhat Kumar Pandey	Bharatiya Janata Party
1993	Prabhat Kumar Pandey	Bharatiya Janata Party
1998	Nitya Niranjan Khampariya	Indian National Congress
2003	Dilip Dubey	Bharatiya Janata Party
2008	Nandni Maravi	Bharatiya Janata Party
2013	Nandni Maravi	Bharatiya Janata Party
2018	Nandni Maravi	Bharatiya Janata Party
2023	Santosh Varkade	Bharatiya Janata Party

== Election results ==
=== 2023 ===
2023 Madhya Pradesh Legislative Assembly election: Sihora
Party	Candidate	Votes	%	±%
BJP	Santosh Varkade	101,777	56.07	+10.67
INC	Ekta Thakur	59,005	32.51	−8.66
BSP	Subhash Singh Markam	11,101	6.12	+2.39
Independent	Dr. Sanjiv Warkhede	2,906	1.6	new
Bharatiya Shakti Chetna Party	Shiv Prasad Dhurve	2,213	1.22	new
NOTA	None of the above	3,033	1.67	−1.19
Majority		42,772	23.56	+19.33
Turnout		181,523	80.71	+4.42
BJP hold		Swing		

=== 2018 ===
2018 Madhya Pradesh Legislative Assembly election: Sihora
Party	Candidate	Votes	%	±%
BJP	Nandni Maravi	73,312	45.4	N/A
INC	Khiladi Singh Aarmo	66,489	41.17	N/A
BSP	Babita Gautiya	6,028	3.73	N/A
GGP	Maahu Singh Paraste	5,937	3.68	N/A
Sapaks Party	Sanjay Kumar Kol	2,464	1.53	new
NOTA	None of the above	4,620	2.86	N/A
Majority		6,823	4.23	N/A
Turnout		161,482	76.29	N/A
BJP hold		Swing		

== See also ==
- Sihora
