= Tejlal Tambhare Harishchandra =

Indian politician

Tejlal Tambhare Harishchandra was an Indian politician from the state of the Madhya Pradesh. He represented Kiranpur Assembly constituency of undivided Madhya Pradesh Legislative Assembly by winning General election of 1957 from Indian National Congress.
