= Anchal Sonkar =

Indian politician

Member of the Madhya Pradesh Legislative Assembly
- In office 2013–2018
- Preceded by: Lakhan Ghangoriya
- Succeeded by: Lakhan Ghangoriya
- Constituency: Jabalpur East
- In office 1993–2008
- Preceded by: Mangal Parag
- Succeeded by: Lakhan Ghangoriya
- Constituency: Jabalpur East

Personal details
- Born: 1960 (age 65–66) Jabalpur district
- Party: Bhartiya Janata Party
- Parent: Babulal Sonkar (father)
- Education: B.A. from Kesharvani College, Jabalpur University in 1977
- Occupation: Politician
- Profession: Pensioner

Anchal Sonkar is an Indian politician and a member of the 2013 Legislative Assembly of India. He represents the Jabalpur Purba constituency of Madhya Pradesh and is a member of the Bhartiya Janata Party political party. He lost re-election in 2018 to Lakhan Ghanghoriya by a margin of over twenty-two percent.

== Early life and education ==
Anchal Sonkar was born in Jabalpur district. He is educated till B.A. from Kesharvani College, Jabalpur University in 1977.

== Political career ==
Anchal Sonkar has been a MLA for 5 term. He represented the Jabalpur constituency and is a member of the Bhartiya Janata Party political party. Jabalpur seat is reserved for SC category.
