= Sitasharan Sharma =

Indian politician, lawyer, and doctor

Dr. Sitasharan Sharma

Member of the Madhya Pradesh Legislative Assembly
- Incumbent
- Assumed office 2013
- Preceded by: Girja Shanker Sharma
- Constituency: Hoshangabad

Personal details
- Party: Bhartiya Janta Party
- Occupation: Politician

Dr. Sitasharan Sharma is an Indian politician, lawyer, and doctor. He served as the Speaker of the Madhya Pradesh Legislative Assembly (January 2014 -January 2019). He is the incumbent MLA from Narmadapuram (Vidhan Sabha constituency). He is a senior leader of Bharatiya Janata Party. It is his 6th term as MLA from the same constituency. He also served as the Chief Whip of the Bharatiya Janata Party Vidhaayak Dal in Madhya Pradesh Legislative Assembly from 1998 to 2003.

== Education ==
He has done MBBS from Gandhi Medical College, Bhopal and LLB from Narmada Mahavidyalaya, Narmadapuram.

Sitasharan Sharma in a technical discussion with conference chair Prof. Saraju Mohanty during IEEE International Symposium on Nanoelectronic and Information Systems 2015 at Oriental University, Indore.

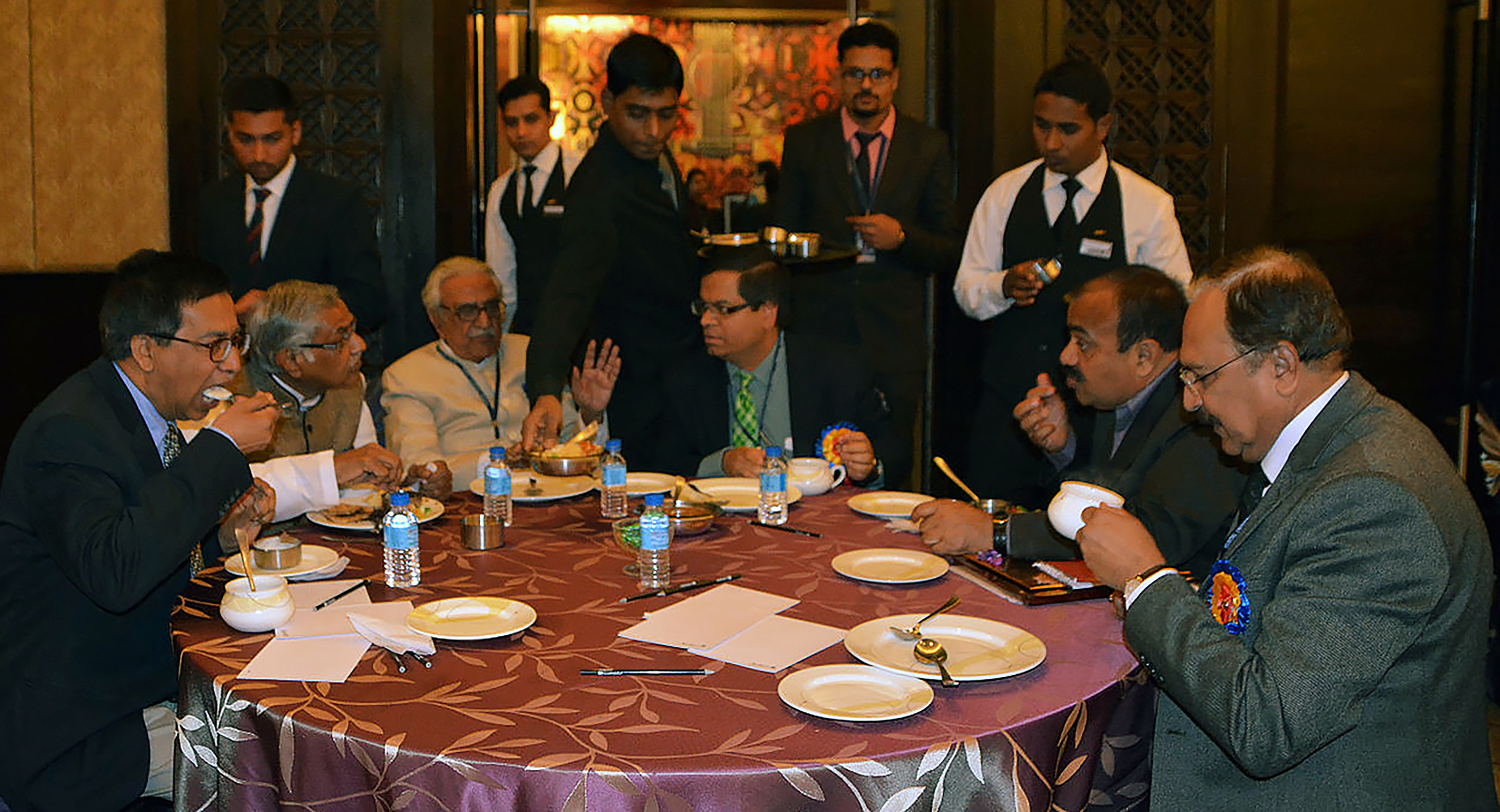
Sitasharan Sharma during lunch at iNIS 2015 at Oriental University Indore, India.

== Political career ==
In December 2023, Senior BJP leader Dr. Sitasaran Sharma won his Sixth consecutive term as a Member of the Legislative Assembly (MLA) as a candidate of Bharatiya Janata Party. He has not lost any election so far.

From 2014 to 2019, Dr. Sitasaran Sharma served as the Speaker of the Madhya Pradesh Legislative Assembly also.

== Role as the Speaker of Madhya Pradesh Legislative Assembly ==
Dr. Sharma ran the Madhya Pradesh Legislative Assembly for 4 years, 9 months from 2014 to 2019. He succeeded Ishwardas Rohani, who had been the speaker twice earlier. He took the oath in presence of then Madhya Pradesh Governor, Anandiben Patel.

S.No.	Position Held	Term	Time Served
1.	Speaker, Madhya Pradesh Legislative Assembly	January 2014- December 2019	4 years, 11 months
