= Achhelal Sonkar =

Indian politician

Member of the Madhya Pradesh Legislative Assembly
- In office 1985–1990
- Constituency: Jabalpur East

Personal details
- Born: 1 July 1951 (age 74) Jabalpur, Madhya Pradesh, India
- Party: Indian National Congress
- Spouse: Smt. Shanti Devi Sonkar
- Education: MA Psychology, LLB
- Alma mater: Hitkarini Law College, Rani Durgavati Vishwavidyalaya
- Occupation: Politician, Social activist, Wrestler
- Known for: Member of Legislative Assembly

Achhelal Sonkar is an Indian politician and member of Indian National Congress party. He represented Jabalpur East Vidhan Sabha.
