= Baburao Paranjpe =

Indian politician

Baburao Paranjpe (बाबूराव परांजपे; 1922–1999) was an Indian politician. Shri Paranjape was a leader of Bharatiya Janata Party and a member of Lok Sabha from Jabalpur in Madhya Pradesh. He was a member of Seventh Lok Sabha (1982–84) after winning bye-election in 1982, Ninth (1989–91), Eleventh (1996–98) and Twelfth (1998–1999) Lok Sabha. He was the defeated BJP candidate from Jabalpur in 1984 and 1991 elections, when there was pro-Congress sympathy wave after the assassinations of Indira Gandhi and Rajiv Gandhi respectively.

He was Mayor of Jabalpur from 1957 to 1975. Paranjpe joined Azad Hind Fauj and saw action during the Second World War in 1944. He died on 27 September 1999.
