= Ishwardas Rohani =

Indian politician

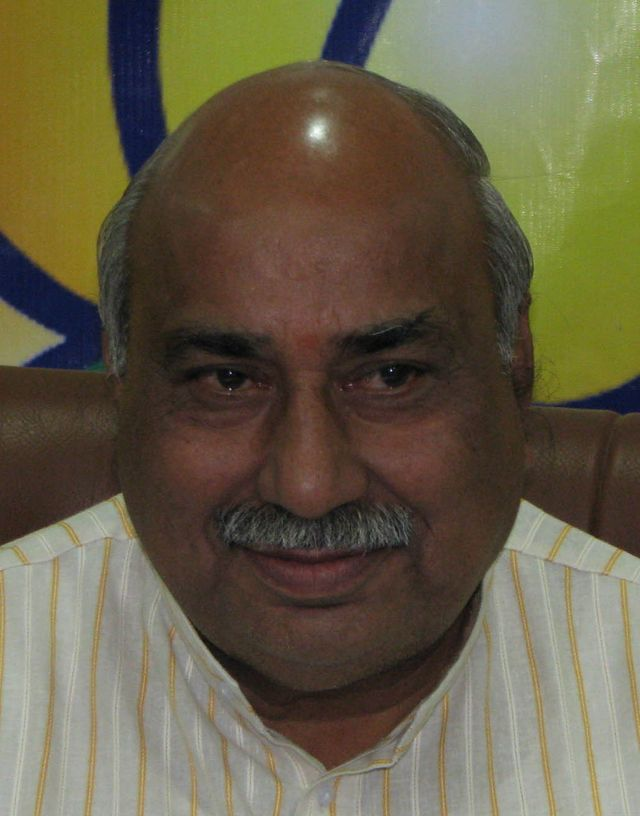

Personal details
- Born: 30 June 1946 Karachi, Bombay Presidency, British India (present-day Sindh, Pakistan)
- Died: 5 November 2013 (67 years)
- Party: Bharatiya Janata Party
- Occupation: Politician
- Nickname: Dada

Ishwardas Rohani (30 June 1946 – 5 November 2013) was an Indian politician of Bharatiya Janata Party. He was born on 30 June 1946 in Karachi, Bombay Presidency, British India (present-day Sindh, Pakistan).He was elected to the assembly from Jabalpur. He has been the Assembly Speaker of the Madhya Pradesh Legislative Assembly, since 2003 until 2013. He was the Deputy Speaker from 1998 to 2003.

== Personal life ==
Mr. Rohani was born in Karachi in 1946. He migrated with his family to Jabalpur during the Partition, a year later. His son Ashok Rohani is an active and famous politician in Jabalpur, India.

== Political career ==
Mr. Rohani joined the Bharatiya Jan Sangh in 1965 and was elected to the Jabalpur Municipal Corporation in 1973. He was detained under the Maintenance of Internal Security Act during The Emergency.
He was elected Deputy Speaker in 1998 and served as speaker from 2003 until his death.

Ishawardas Rohani
Deputy Speaker	1998-2003
Speaker	2003-2013

== Death ==
Ishwardas Rohani died of cardiac arrest on 5 November 2013. He was 67.
