= Kunji Lal Dubey =

Indian politician (1896-1970)

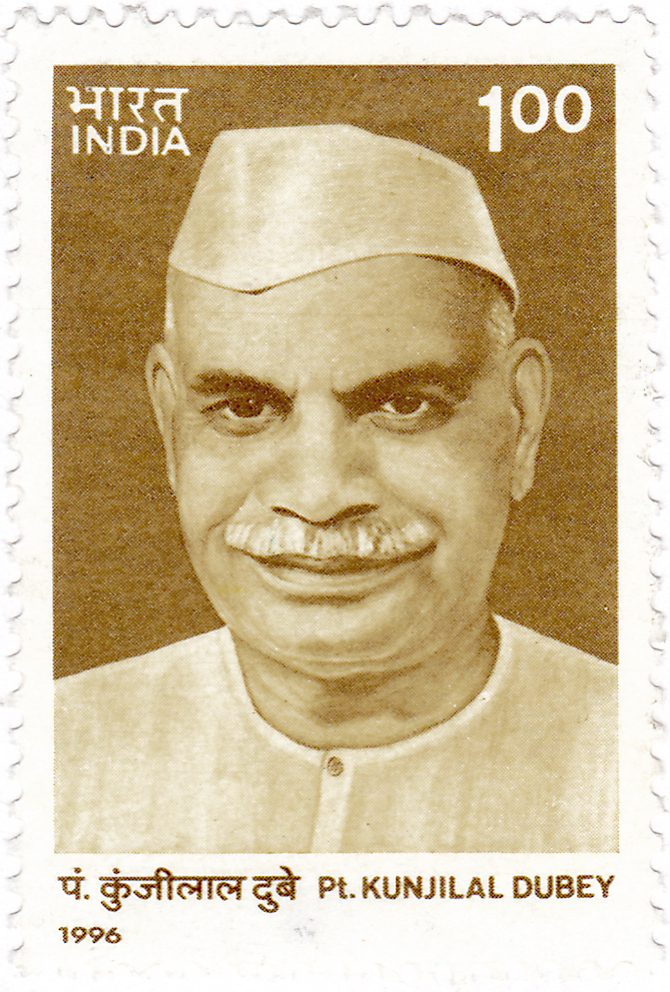
- Born: 18 March 1896; Amagaon, Berar Province, British India
- Died: 2 June 1970 (aged 74); Madhya Pradesh, India
- Occupations: Indian independence activist Educationist; Politician; Lawyer
- Known for: Indian freedom struggle Education
- Spouse: Lalitabai
- Children: Pt. Vishwanath Dubey (also owned the Phoenix group of companies.
- Awards: Padma Bhushan

Kunji Lal Dubey (18 March 1896 – 2 June 1970) was an Indian independence activist, lawyer, educationist and politician from Madhya Pradesh. He was the first vice chancellor of Rani Durgavati University and the chancellor of Nagpur University. He served as the first speaker of Madhya Pradesh Legislative Assembly in 1956, as the Finance Minister of the State in 1967 and was the president of the Inter University Board of India, Burma and Ceylon. The Government of India awarded him the third highest civilian honour, the Padma Bhushan, in 1964, for his contributions to the society. India Post issued a commemorative stamp on Dubey in 1996.

== Biography ==
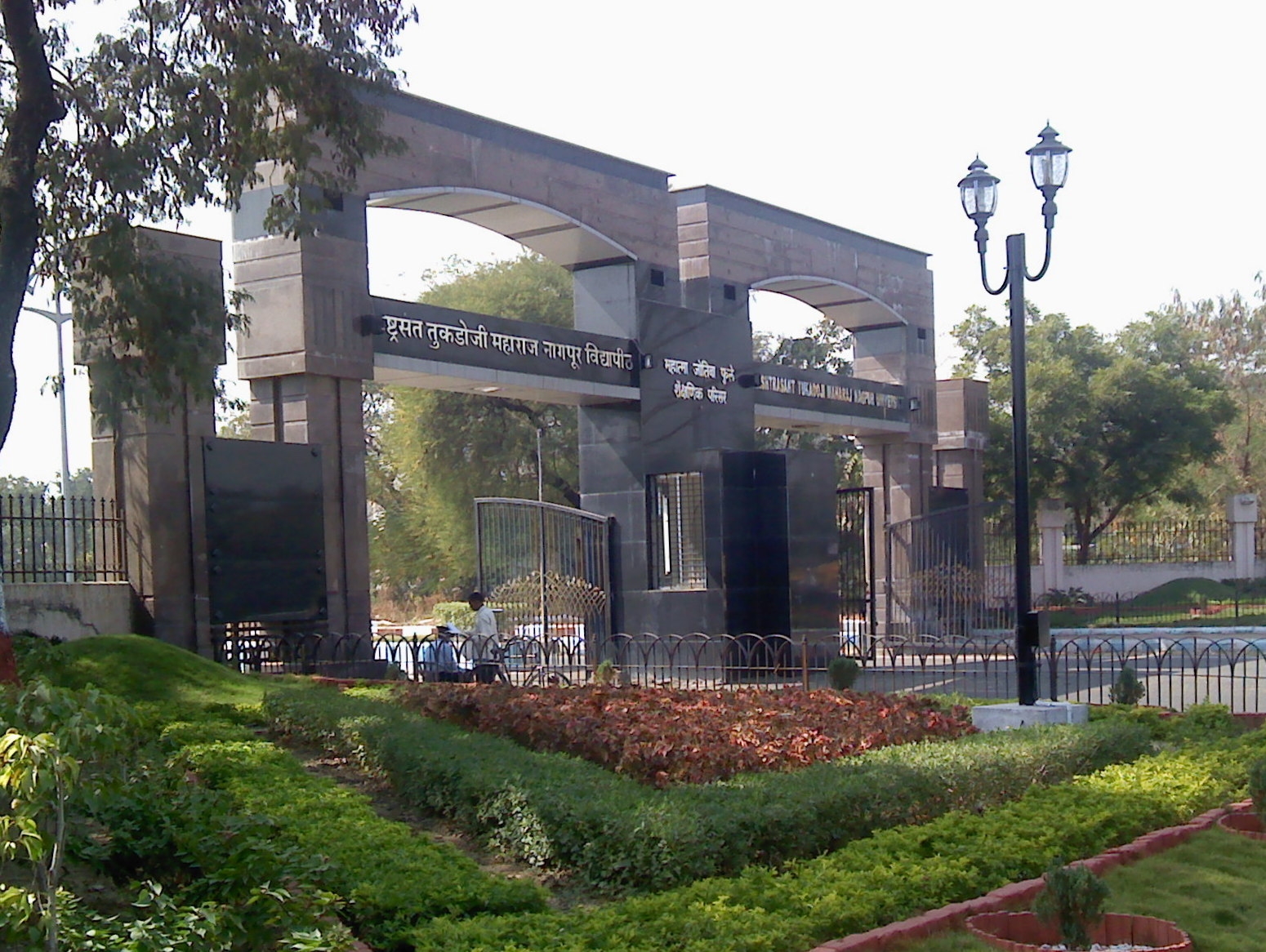
Nagpur University Campus entrance

Dubey was born on 18 March 1896 at Amgaon, a village in the Narsinghpur district in Berar Province. After primary education at the village school in Kareli, he did his middle school studies at Narasinghpur and high school education at Akola. Joining Robertson College, Jabalpur in 1914, he graduated in 1918. He moved to Allahabad for a degree course in law and graduated in law with first class in 1920. It was during this time, that he came under the influence of Indian freedom activists such as Madan Mohan Malaviya and Narasimha Chintaman Kelkar and entered the mainstream freedom movement. In 1934, he was elected as the president of the Inter-University Board of India, Burma and Ceylon and also held the post of the president of its legislative assembly. The following year, he joined Hitkarini Law College, Jabalpur as a professor.

Aligning himself with the activities of the Indian National Congress, he became a member of All India Congress Committee (AICC) in 1937 and two years later, when the Tripuri Session of the AICC was convened in 1939, he was the secretary of the reception committee. In 1941, he was selected for the Satyagraha by Mahatma Gandhi, but was detained by the police and sentenced to six months in jail, only to be released in 1942. On his release, he participated in the Quit India movement and was jailed again, this time for a period of two years. In 1946, he contested the first Assembly elections from Jabalpur and was elected unopposed to become the Chief Parliamentary Secretary of the cabinet. He successfully contested the first Assembly election of the newly formed state of Madhya Pradesh and became the first speaker of the house, but the tenure was short (1956–57). He continued to hold the post of the speaker for two more terms, from 1957 to 1962 and from 1962 to 1967.

In 1946, the year of his election to the state assembly, he was appointed as the chancellor of Nagpur University, a post he held for three consecutive terms. During his tenure, he established seats for the departments of Hindi and Marathi. He was involved in arranging the translation of 42 English texts to Hindi which were published in 1934 and prepared another 75 such texts which helped the students to learn science subjects in local languages. He was also associated with Madhya Pradesh Sahitya Sammelan and served as its president for one term. After the passing of Jabalpur University bill, the state government established Rani Durgavati University in 1956 with Dubey as its founder vice chancellor. He was elected from the Jabalpur constituency again 1967 and held the portfolio of Finance in the Dwarka Prasad Mishra ministry during its second term from March 1967 to July 1967.

Kunji Lal Dubey, who served as the President of the Madhya Pradesh Olympic Association, Madhya Pradesh Cricket Association and All India Ayurved Parishad, besides being a founder member of the Madhya Pradesh Lalit Kala Akademi, was married to Lalitabai and the couple had three sons and three daughters. He died on 2 June 1970, at the age of 74.

== Awards and honours ==
The Government of India awarded the civilian honour of the Padma Bhushan to Dubey in 1964. He received the degree of Doctor of Law (honoris causa) from Jabalpur University in 1965, followed by DLitt from Vikram University in 1967. India Post honoured him with a commemorative postage stamp in 1996. A Law school in Bhopal, Pandit Kunjilal Dubey Rashtriya Sansadiya Vidyapeeth, has been named after Dubey and the local school in his native village, Amgaon, bears the name, Kunjilal Dubey Vidyalaya, after him. Pandit Kunjilal Dubey Memorial Lecture Series, is an annual oration, instituted by Rani Durgavati University, in memory of its founder vice chancellor. The University has also named its auditorium after him as Pandit Kunjilal Dubey Auditorium.

== See also ==
- Rani Durgavati University
- Nagpur University
- Speaker of the Madhya Pradesh Legislative Assembly
- List of postage stamps of India

Political offices
Preceded by None	Speaker of Legislative Assembly of Madhya Pradesh; 1956–1967	Succeeded by Kashi Prasad Pandey
Preceded by	Finance Minister of Government of Madhya Pradesh; 1967	Succeeded by
