= Kashi Prasad Pandey =

Indian politician

Kashi Prasad Pandey a.k.a. Jairam Pandey was an Indian politician from the state of the Madhya Pradesh. He represented Sihora Vidhan Sabha constituency of undivided Madhya Pradesh Legislative Assembly by winning General election of 1957.
