= 1985 Madhya Pradesh Legislative Assembly election =

Indian state election

← 1980	3 February 1985	1990 →

All 320 assembly constituencies 161 seats needed for a majority
- Turnout: 49.83%
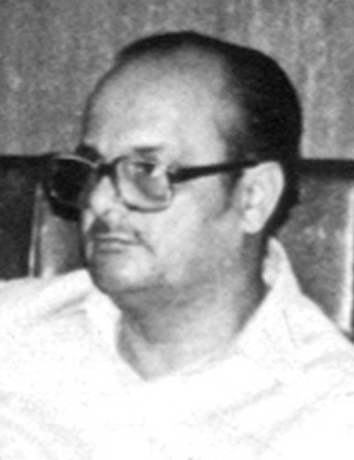

	Majority party	Minority party
Leader	Arjun Singh	Sunderlal Patwa
Party	INC	BJP
Leader since	1980	1969
Last election	246	60
Seats won	250	58
Seat change	▲4	▼2
Popular vote	69,37,443	46,02,249
Percentage	48.87%	32.42%
Chief Minister before election
Arjun Singh
INC
Elected Chief Minister
Arjun Singh
INC

Elections to the Madhya Pradesh Legislative Assembly were held in 1985. The Indian National Congress won a majority of seats and Arjun Singh was sworn in as the new Chief Minister but was forced to resign as Chief Minister after just one day due to differences with Sriniwas Tiwari. Motilal Vora succeeded him as Chief Minister. Arjun Singh was sworn in as the Governor of Punjab after this.

== Result ==
Party	Seats Contested	Seats won	Seats Changed	% Votes
Indian National Congress	320	250	▲4	48.87
Bharatiya Janata Party	311	58	▼2	32.42%
Janata Party	172	5	▲3	4.01%
Indian National Congress (S)	30	1	N/A	0.40%
Independents	320	6	▼2	10.82%
	Total		320	

== Elected members ==
Constituency	Reserved for	Member	Party
Sheopur	None	Satyabhanu Chauhan	Indian Congress
Bijeypur	None	Baboolal Mewra	Bharatiya Janata Party
Sabalgarh	None	Bhagwati Prasad Bansal	Indian National Congress
Joura	None	Mahesh Dutt Mishra	Indian National Congress
Sumawali	None	Kirat Ram Singh Kansana	Indian National Congress
Morena	None	Jahar Singh Sharma	Bharatiya Janata Party
Dimni	SC	Munshilal	Bharatiya Janata Party
Ambah	SC	Ram Narayan Sakhawar	Indian National Congress
Gohad	SC	Chaturvhuj Bhadkari	Indian National Congress
Mehgaon	None	Rustam Singh	Indian National Congress
Attair	None	Satyadev Katare	Indian National Congress
Bhind	None	Udayabhan Singh	Indian National Congress
Ron	None	Ramashankar Singh	Indian National Congress
Saitual	None	Mathura Prasad Mahant	Bharatiya Janata Party
Gwalior	None	Dharam Vir	Bharatiya Janata Party
Lashkar East	None	Gangaram Bandil	Bharatiya Janata Party
Lashkar West	None	Kamta Prasad	Indian National Congress
Morar	None	Dhyanendra Singh	Bharatiya Janata Party
Gird	None	Balendu Shukla	Indian National Congress
Dabra	None	Narsinghrao Pawar	Indian National Congress
Bhander	SC	Radhesham Chandoriya	Indian National Congress
Seondha	SC	Mahendra	Indian National Congress
Datia	None	Rajendra Kumar Bharti	Indian National Congress
Karera	None	Hanumant Singh Dau	Indian National Congress
Pohri	None	Himanshu Sharma	Indian National Congress
Shivpuri	None	Ganesh Ram	Indian National Congress
Pichhore	None	Bhaiya Sahab	Indian National Congress
Kolaras	SC	Pooran Singh	Indian National Congress
Guna	None	Shivpratap Singh	Indian National Congress
Chachaura	None	Devendra Singh	Indian National Congress
Raghogarh	None	Mulsingh	Indian National Congress
Shadora	SC	Ramsuman	Indian National Congress
Ashoknagar	None	Ravindra Singh	Indian National Congress
Mungaoli	None	Gajram Singh	Indian National Congress
Bina	None	Sudhakar Bapat	Bharatiya Janata Party
Khurai	SC	Malti Arvind Kumar	Indian National Congress
Banda	None	Harnamsingh Rathod	Bharatiya Janata Party
Naryaoli	SC	Lokman Khatik	Indian National Congress
Sagar	None	Prakash Motilal Jain	Indian National Congress
Surkhi	None	Vitthal Bhai Patel	Indian National Congress
Rehli	None	Gopal Bhargawa	Bharatiya Janata Party
Deori	None	Bhagwat Singh	Indian National Congress
Niwari	None	Chaturvedi Ram Ratan	Indian National Congress
Jatara	None	Thakur Das Yadav	Indian National Congress
Khargapur	SC	Vindravan Ahirwar	Indian National Congress
Tikamgarh	None	Yadvendra Singh	Indian National Congress
Malehra	None	Shivraj Bhaiya	Bharatiya Janata Party
Bijawar	None	Jujhar Singh	Bharatiya Janata Party
Chhatarpur	None	Jagadamba Prasad Nigam	Janata Party
Maharajpur	SC	Ahirwar Baboolal	Indian National Congress
Chandla	None	Shyam Behari Pathak	Indian National Congress
Nohata	None	Rajbahudur Singh	Indian National Congress
Damoh	None	Mukesh Nayak	Indian National Congress
Patharia	SC	Shyamlal	Indian National Congress
Hatta	None	Ramkrishna Kusmaria	Bharatiya Janata Party
Panna	None	Jai Prakash Patel	Bharatiya Janata Party
Amanganj	None	Kashi Prasad	Bharatiya Janata Party
Pawai	None	Jaipal Singh	Indian National Congress
Maihar	None	Lalji Patel	Independent
Nagod	None	Rampratap Singh	Indian National Congress
Raigaon	SC	Ramshray Prasad	Indian National Congress
Chitrakoot	None	Ramchandra Bajpayee	Indian National Congress
Satna	None	Lalta Prasad Khare	Indian National Congress
Rampur Baghelan	None	Harsh Singh	Indian National Congress
Amarpatan	None	Ram Hit	Bharatiya Janata Party
Rewa	None	Prem Lal Mishra	Janata Party
Gurh	None	Nagendra Singh	Indian National Congress
Mangawan	None	Champa Devi	Indian National Congress
Sirmaur	None	Rajmani Patel	Indian National Congress
Teonthar	None	Garud Kumar	Indian National Congress
Deotalab	SC	Bindra	Indian National Congress
Mauganj	None	Jagdish Tiwari Masuriha	Bharatiya Janata Party
Churahat	None	Arjun Singh	Indian National Congress
Sidhi	None	Indrajit Kumar	Indian National Congress
Gopadbanas	None	Kamleshwar	Indian National Congress
Dhauhani	ST	Jagwa Devi	Indian National Congress
Deosar	ST	Annath Singh	Bharatiya Janata Party
Singrauli	SC	Ram Charitra	Bharatiya Janata Party
Beohari	None	Shukla Ramkishore	Indian National Congress
Umaria	None	Ranvijaya Pratap Singh	Indian National Congress
Nowrozabad	ST	Dhanshah	Indian National Congress
Jaisinghnagar	ST	Gopila Singh	Indian National Congress
Kotma	ST	Bhagwandeen	Indian National Congress
Anuppur	ST	Girja Kumari	Indian National Congress
Sohagpur	None	Gambhir Singh	Indian National Congress
Pushprajgarh	ST	Deelan Singh	Indian National Congress
Manendragarh	ST	Vijoy Singh	Indian National Congress
Baikunthpur	None	Dwarika Prasad	Bharatiya Janata Party
Premnagar	ST	Tuleshwar	Bharatiya Janata Party
Surajpur	ST	Khelsai	Indian National Congress
Pal	ST	Deosai	Indian National Congress
Samri	ST	Maheshwar Ram	Indian National Congress
Lundra	ST	Bhola Singh	Indian National Congress
Pilkha	ST	Premsai Singh	Indian National Congress
Ambikapur	ST	Madan Gopal	Indian National Congress
Sitapur	ST	Sukhi Ram	Indian National Congress
Bagicha	ST	Vikram Bhagat	Bharatiya Janata Party
Jashpur	ST	Ganesh Ram	Bharatiya Janata Party
Tapkara	ST	Nandkumar Sai	Bharatiya Janata Party
Pathalgaon	ST	Rampukar Singh	Indian National Congress
Dharamjaigarh	ST	Chaneshram Rathia	Indian National Congress
Lailunga	ST	Surendra Kumar Singh	Indian National Congress
Raigarh	None	Krishna Kumar	Indian National Congress
Kharsia	None	Laxmi Prasad Patel	Indian National Congress
Saria	None	Kamala Devi	Indian National Congress
Sarangarh	SC	Puriram Chauhan	Independent
Rampur	ST	Pyarelal	Indian National Congress
Katghora	None	Bodhram	Indian National Congress
Tanakhar	ST	Hira Singh Markam	Bharatiya Janata Party
Marwahi	ST	Dindayal	Indian National Congress
Kota	None	Rajendra Prasad Shukla	Indian National Congress
Lormi	None	Bhupendra Singh	Bharatiya Janata Party
Mungeli	SC	Durgawati	Indian National Congress
Jarhagaon	SC	Punnulal Mohle	Bharatiya Janata Party
Takhatpur	None	Manharanlal Pandey	Bharatiya Janata Party
Bilaspur	None	B. R. Yadav	Indian National Congress
Bilha	None	Chitrakant Jaiswal	Indian National Congress
Masturi	SC	Banshilal	Indian National Congress
Sipat	None	Arun Tiwari	Indian National Congress
Akaltara	None	Rakesh Kumar Singh	Indian National Congress
Pamgarh	None	Sheo Prasad Sharma	Indian National Congress
Champa	None	Charandas Bisahoodas	Indian National Congress
Sakti	None	Surendra Bahadur	Indian National Congress
Malkharoda	SC	Deochanran Singh	Indian National Congress
Chandrapur	None	Bhawani Lal Verma	Indian National Congress
Raipur Town	None	Swarupchand Jain	Indian National Congress
Raipur Rural	None	Ranveer Singh Shastry	Indian National Congress
Abhanpur	None	Chandra Shekhar Sahu	Bharatiya Janata Party
Mandirhasod	None	Satyanarayan Sharma	Indian National Congress
Arang	SC	Vijay Kumar Guru	Indian National Congress
Dharsiwa	None	Daulatram Verma	Indian National Congress
Bhatapara	None	Kalawati Sheolal Mehta	Indian National Congress
Baloda Bazar	None	Narendra Mishra	Indian National Congress
Palari	SC	Phul Singh Miri	Indian National Congress
Kasdol	None	Kanhailal Sharma	Indian National Congress
Bhatgaon	SC	Reshamlal Jangade	Bharatiya Janata Party
Saraipali	None	Pukhraj Singh	Independent
Basna	None	Mahendra Bahadur Singh	Indian National Congress
Khallari	None	Laxminarayan Induriya	Indian National Congress
Mahasamund	None	Maksudanlal Chandrakar	Indian National Congress
Rajim	None	Punit Ram Sahu	Bharatiya Janata Party
Bidnranawagarh	ST	Ishwarsingh	Indian National Congress
Sihawa	ST	Ashok Som	Indian National Congress
Kurud	None	Bhuleshwari Deepa Sahu	Indian National Congress
Dhamtari	None	Jayaben	Indian National Congress
Bhanupratappur	ST	Ganga Potai	Indian National Congress
Kanker	ST	Shyamabai Dhrua	Indian National Congress
Keskal	ST	Shiv Netam	Indian National Congress
Kondagaon	ST	Sukhlal Mandavi	Indian National Congress
Bhanpuri	ST	Baliram Mahadeo Kashyap	Bharatiya Janata Party
Jagdalpur	ST	Jhitroo Ram Baghel	Indian National Congress
Keslur	ST	Bharsu Ram Nag	Indian National Congress
Chitrakote	ST	A. K. Turam Nag	Indian National Congress
Dantewara	ST	Lakshman Karma	Indian National Congress
Konta	ST	Madvi Handaram	Indian National Congress
Bijapur	ST	Shishu Pal Singh	Indian National Congress
Narayanpur	ST	Badri Nath Baghel	Indian National Congress
Maro	SC	Kishanlal Kurre	Indian National Congress
Bemetara	None	Rewendra Singh	Indian National Congress
Saja	None	Ravindra Choube	Indian National Congress
Dhamdha	None	Jageshwar Sahu	Indian National Congress
Durg	None	Motilal Vora	Indian National Congress
Bhilai	None	Ravi Arya	Indian National Congress
Patan	None	Anantram Verma	Indian National Congress
Gunderdehi	None	Hariharprasad Sharma	Indian National Congress
Khertha	None	Wasudeo Chandrakar	Indian National Congress
Balod	None	Jalamsingh Patel	Indian National Congress
Dondi Lohara	ST	Janaklal Thakur	Independent
Chowki	ST	Gowardhan Netam	Indian National Congress
Khujji	None	Imran Memon	Indian National Congress
Dongargaon	None	Heera Ram Verma	Indian National Congress
Rajnandgaon	None	Balbir Khanuja	Indian National Congress
Dongargarh	SC	Dhanesh Kumar Patila	Indian National Congress
Khairagarh	None	Rashmi Devi	Indian National Congress
Birendranagar	None	Balram Singh Bais	Indian National Congress
Kawardha	None	Rani Shashi Prabha Devi	Indian National Congress
Baihar	ST	Ganpat Singh	Indian National Congress
Lanji	None	Narbada Parsad	Janata Party
Kirnapur	None	Bhoowanlal	Bharatiya Janata Party
Waraseoni	None	K. D. Deshmukh	Janata Party
Khairalanjee	None	Vishweshwar Bhagat	Indian National Congress
Katangi	None	Nirmal Hirawat	Indian National Congress
Balaghat	None	Gourishankar Bisen Chaturbhuj	Bharatiya Janata Party
Paraswada	None	Kankar Mujare	Janata Party
Nainpur	ST	Laxmi Prasad Uikey	Indian National Congress
Mandla	ST	Himmat Singh Parteti	Indian National Congress
Bichhia	ST	Manik Lal Parteti	Indian National Congress
Bajag	ST	Ram Bhajan Patta	Bharatiya Janata Party
Dindori	ST	Dharamsingh Masram	Indian National Congress
Shahpura	ST	Annopsingh Maravi	Bharatiya Janata Party
Niwas	ST	Dayalsingh Tumrachi	Indian National Congress
Bargi	ST	Sonsingh	Bharatiya Janata Party
Panagar	ST	Bhishamshah Ju Deo	Indian National Congress
Jabalpur Cantonment	None	Chandra Mohan	Indian National Congress
Jabalpur East	SC	Achhelal Sonkar	Indian National Congress
Jabalpur Central	None	Onkar Prasad Tiwari	Bharatiya Janata Party
Jabalpur West	None	Chandra Kumar Bhanot	Indian National Congress
Patan	None	Priyadarshan Dharmadhikari	Indian National Congress
Majholi	None	Satyendra Prasad Mishra	Indian National Congress
Sihora	None	Manju Rai	Indian National Congress
Bahoriband	None	Shrawan Kumar Patel	Indian National Congress
Murwara	None	Sunil Mishra	Indian National Congress
Badwara	None	Hazi Gulam Ahmad	Indian National Congress
Vijairaghogarh	None	Lal Rajendra Singh Baghel	Bharatiya Janata Party
Gadarwara	None	Naginchand Kapoorchand	Bharatiya Janata Party
Bohani	None	Vinayashankar Dubey	Indian National Congress
Narsimhapur	None	Shashibhushan Singh	Indian National Congress
Gotegaon	SC	Narmadaprasad	Indian National Congress
Lakhanadon	ST	Satyendrasingh Deepsingh	Indian National Congress
Ghansor	ST	Urmila Singh	Indian National Congress
Keolari	None	Vimala Verma	Indian National Congress
Barghat	None	Prabha Bhargava	Indian National Congress
Seoni	None	Ramesh Chand Jain	Indian National Congress
Jamai	ST	Ganpat Singh Dhurve	Indian National Congress
Chhindwara	None	Kamleshwari Shukla	Indian National Congress
Parasia	SC	Ramji Mastkar	Bharatiya Janata Party
Damua	ST	Anusuiya Uikey	Indian National Congress
Amarwara	ST	Shailkumari	Indian National Congress
Chaurai	None	Baijnath Prasad Saxena	Indian National Congress
Sausar	None	Chore Revnath	Indian National Congress
Pandhurna	None	Marotrao Khaose	Independent
Piparia	None	Tribhuwan Yadav	Indian National Congress
Hoshangabad	None	Ambica Prasad Shukla	Indian National Congress
Itarsi	None	Vijay Dubey (kaku Bhai)	Indian National Congress
Seoni-malwa	None	Omprakash Raghubanshi	Indian National Congress
Timarni	SC	Khi Prasad Bastwar	Indian National Congress
Harda	None	Vishnu Rajoriya	Indian National Congress
Multai	None	Ashok Kadwe	Indian National Congress
Masod	None	Ramji Mahajan	Indian National Congress
Bhainsdehi	ST	Satish Kumar Chauhan	Indian National Congress
Betul	None	Ashok Sable	Indian National Congress
Ghora Dongri	ST	Meera	Indian National Congress
Amla	SC	Kanahiyalal Dholeker	Bharatiya Janata Party
Budhni	None	Chauhan Singh	Indian National Congress
Ichhawar	None	Karan Singh Kanahiyalal	Bharatiya Janata Party
Ashta	SC	Ajit Singh Umrao Singh	Indian National Congress
Sehore	None	Shankar Lal	Indian National Congress
Govindpura	None	Babulal Gaur	Bharatiya Janata Party
Bhopal South	None	Hasnat Siddiqui	Bharatiya Janata Party
Bhopal North	None	Rasul Ahmad Siddiqui	Indian National Congress
Berasia	None	Laxmi Narayan Sharma	Bharatiya Janata Party
Sanchi	SC	Prabhuram Choudhri	Indian National Congress
Udaipura	None	Vimala Sharma	Indian National Congress
Bareli	None	Jaswant Singh	Indian National Congress
Bhojpur	None	Sunder Lal Patwa	Bharatiya Janata Party
Kurwai	SC	Shyamlal Shankarlal	Bharatiya Janata Party
Basoda	None	Veersingh Raghuvanshi	Indian National Congress
Vidisha	None	Moharsingh Thakur	Bharatiya Janata Party
Shamshabad	None	Mertab Singh	Indian National Congress
Sironj	None	Goverdhan Upadhyay	Indian National Congress
Biaora	None	Vijay Singh	Indian National Congress
Narsingarh	None	Rajya Vardhan Singh	Indian National Congress
Sarangpur	SC	Hajarilal	Indian National Congress
Rajgarh	None	Gulabsingh Sustani	Indian National Congress
Khilchipur	None	Kanhaiyalal Dangi	Indian National Congress
Shujalpur	None	Vidyadhar Joshi	Indian National Congress
Gulana	None	Laxman Singh Dodiya	Indian National Congress
Shajapur	None	Purushottam	Bharatiya Janata Party
Agar	SC	Shakuntala Bai Chouhan	Indian National Congress
Susner	None	Hari Bhau Joshi	Bharatiya Janata Party
Tarana	SC	Durgadas Suryavanshi	Indian National Congress
Mahidpur	None	Nathulal Sisodiya	Bharatiya Janata Party
Khachrod	None	Ranchhodlal Aanjna	Indian National Congress
Badnagar	None	Abhaysingh	Indian National Congress
Ghatiya	SC	Avantika Prasad Marmat	Indian National Congress
Ujjain North	None	Batuk Shanker Joshi	Indian National Congress
Ujjain South	None	Mahavir Prasad Vashisth	Indian National Congress
Depalpur	None	Rameshwar Patel	Indian National Congress
Mhow	None	Bherulal Patidar	Bharatiya Janata Party
Indore-i	None	Lalit Jain	Indian National Congress
Indore-ii	None	Kanhaiyalal Yadav	Indian National Congress
Indore-iii	None	Mahesh Joshi	Indian National Congress
Indore-iv	None	Nandlal Mata	Indian National Congress
Indore-v	None	Suresh Seth	Independent
Sawer	SC	Tulsi Silawat	Indian National Congress
Dewas	None	Chandra Prabhashekhar	Indian National Congress
Sonkatch	SC	Sajjan Singh Verma	Indian National Congress
Hatpipliya	None	Rajendrasingh Baghel	Indian National Congress
Bagli	None	Kailash Johi	Bharatiya Janata Party
Khategaon	None	Ganpat Patel	Bharatiya Janata Party
Harsud	ST	Aasharam Petu Patel	Indian National Congress
Nimarkhedi	None	Rajnarayansingh Jaswant Singh	Indian National Congress
Pandhana	SC	Hiralal Silawat	Indian National Congress
Khandwa	None	Nanda Mondloi	Indian National Congress
Nepanagar	None	Tanwansingh Harnamsingh Keer	Indian National Congress
Shahpur	None	Nandkumarsingh Krishankumarsingh	Bharatiya Janata Party
Burhanpur	None	Firoza Ahsan Ali	Indian National Congress
Bhikangaon	ST	Juwansingh	Indian National Congress
Barwaha	None	Rana Balbahadursingh	Indian National Congress
Maheshwar	SC	Vijaylaxmi Sadho	Indian National Congress
Kasrawad	None	Ramesh Chandra Mandloi	Indian National Congress
Khargone	None	Karuna Dhangi	Indian National Congress
Dhulkot	ST	Chidabhai	Indian National Congress
Sendhwa	ST	Bhaisingh Dabar	Indian National Congress
Anjad	ST	Mangilal Adiwasi	Indian National Congress
Rajpur	ST	Barku	Indian National Congress
Barwani	ST	Umraosingh Phatla	Indian National Congress
Manawar	ST	Shivbhanu Solanki	Indian National Congress
Dharampuri	ST	Kiratsingh Rughanath	Indian National Congress
Dhar	None	Mohansingh Bundela	Indian National Congress
Badnawar	None	Ramesh Chandrasinh (gattu Bana)	Bharatiya Janata Party
Sardarpur	ST	Gapatsingh Patel	Indian National Congress
Kukshi	ST	Jamunadevi	Indian National Congress
Alirajpur	ST	Magansingh	Indian National Congress
Jobat	ST	Ajmer Singh	Indian National Congress
Jhabua	ST	Bapusingh	Indian National Congress
Petlawad	ST	Gangabai	Indian National Congress
Thandla	ST	Kantilal Nanu	Indian National Congress
Ratlam Town	None	Himmat Kothari	Bharatiya Janata Party
Ratlam Rural	None	Shantilal Aggarwal	Indian National Congress
Sailana	ST	Prabhudyal Gehlot	Indian National Congress
Jaora	None	Bharatsingh	Indian National Congress
Alot	SC	Leeladeevi Choudhary	Indian National Congress
Manasa	None	Narendra Bhanwarlal Nahta	Indian National Congress
Garoth	None	Subhashkumar Sojatia	Indian National Congress
Suwasara	SC	Asharam Verma	Indian National Congress
Sitamau	None	Bharat Singh Deepakhedra	Indian National Congress
Mandsaur	None	Shyam Sundar Patidar	Indian National Congress
Neemuch	None	Sampatswaroop Sitaram Jajoo	Indian National Congress
Jawad	None	Chunnilal Dhakad	Indian National Congress
