= Jatav (surname) =

जाटव

Languages
- Hindi, Awadhi, Rajasthani, Haryanvi

Religion
- Hinduism (majority) and Buddhism & Ravidassia Panth (minority)

Jatav is an Indian surname that is mostly found among the Hindu community. Notable people with the surname include:

== Politicians ==
=== Member of Parliament, Lok Sabha ===
- Bhajan Lal Jatav, Indian politician, currently Member of Lok Sabha
- Barelal Jatav – Former Member of Parliament, Lok Sabha from Morena.
- Kammodilal Jatav – Indian politician, Ex-MP Lok Sabha from Morena & Ex-MLA.
- Ratan Singh Jatav, Ex-MP Lok Sabha, Bharatpur.
- Sanjana Jatav, Indian politician, Current- MP Lok Sabha, Bharatpur.
- Than Singh Jatav, Indian politician, Former MP from Bayana.
- Girish Chandra Jatav – Ex. Member of Lok Sabha from Nagina constituency, Uttar Pradesh.

=== Member of the Rajasthan Legislative Assembly ===
- Amar Singh Jatav, Indian politician Ex MLA Bayana (Bharatpur)
- Anita Jatav, Indian politician MLA Hindaun (Karauli, Rajasthan)
- Bachchu Singh Jatav, Indian politician
- Bharosi Lal Jatav, Indian politician Former Minister Government of Rajasthan and Ex MLA Hindaun (Karauli, Rajasthan)
- Jairam Jatav (born 1955), Indian politician Ex MLA Alwar Rural (Rajasthan)
- Rajkumari Jatav, Indian politician Ex MLA Hindaun (Karauli, Rajasthan)
- Sanjay Kumar Jatav, Indian politician, MLA in Baseri (Dholpur, Rajasthan)

=== Member of the Madhya Pradesh Legislative Assembly ===
- Bansilal Jatav – 3-Times Former MLA from Ambah constituency, Madhya Pradesh.
- Gopilal Jatav – Ex-MLA from the Guna constituency.
- Jasmant Jatav, Indian politician. Ex-MLA.
- Kamlesh Jatav, Indian politician, Ex-MLA from Ambah constituency.
- Kailash Jatav – Ex-MLA from the Gotegaon constituency.
- Keshav Desai Jatav – Current-MLA from the Gohad constituency.
- Ranvir Jatav, Indian politician and Ex-MLA from the Gohad constituency.
- Shriram Jatav – Two-times Ex-MLA from Gohad constituency, Madhya Pradesh.
- Sopat Jatav – Ex-MLA from the Gohad constituency.
- Pragilal Jatav – Ex-MLA from Karera, Madhya Pradesh.
- Mevaram Jatav – Indian politician and Ex-MLA from the Gohad constituency.
- Makhanlal Jatav – Ex-MLA from the Gohad constituency.

== Others ==
- Chetram Jatav, Indian freedom fighter.
- Pradeep Kumar Jatav – Ex-MLC, Uttar Pradesh Legislative Council
- Satish Chandra Jatav – Ex-MLC, Uttar Pradesh Legislative Council
- Lokesh Kumar Jatav – IAS officer, has served as District Collector of Indore, Neemuch, Rajgarh and Dindori; also held role of Commissioner of Commercial Tax (Indore).
- Manik Chand Jatav - (1897–?), Dalit activist
- Supriya Jatav (born 1991), Indian Karateka

== See also ==
- Jatav
- List of Jatav
- Dalit
- Scheduled Castes
- Bahujan Samaj Party
- List of Dalits
- Fourth Mayawati ministry
