= List of leaders of the opposition in the Madhya Pradesh Legislative Assembly =

Leader of Opposition of the Indian state of Madhya Pradesh

Leader of the Opposition in the Madhya Pradesh Legislative Assembly
- Seal of the Government of Madhya Pradesh
- Incumbent; Umang Singhar since 16 December 2023
- Style: The Honourable
- Status: Leader of Opposition
- Member of: Madhya Pradesh Legislative Assembly
- Seat: Vidhan Bhawan
- Nominator: Members of the Official Opposition of the Legislative Assembly
- Appointer: Speaker of Madhya Pradesh Legislative Assembly
- Term length: 5 years
- Inaugural holder: Vishwanath Yadav Tamaskar
- Formation: 5 March 1957; 69 years ago

The leader of the opposition in the Madhya Pradesh Legislative Assembly is the politician who leads the official opposition in the Madhya Pradesh Legislative Assembly in India.

== Leaders of opposition ==
#	Portrait	Name	Constituency	Tenure			Assembly	Party
1		Vishwanath Tamasker	Bemetara	17 December 1956	5 March 1957	78 days	1st (1952 election)	Praja Socialist Party
2		Chandra Pratap Tiwari	Sidhi	1 July 1957	7 March 1962	4 years, 249 days	2nd (1957 election)	Praja Socialist Party
3		Virendra Sakhlecha	Jawad	28 March 1962	1 March 1967	5 years, 112 days	3rd (1962 election)	Bharatiya Jana Sangh
3		Virendra Sakhlecha	Jawad	1 March 1967	18 July 1967	5 years, 112 days	4th (1967 election)	Bharatiya Jana Sangh
4		Shyama Charan Shukla	Rajim	31 July 1967	8 September 1968	1 year, 39 days	4th (1967 election)	Indian National Congress
5		Dwarka Prasad Mishra	Katangi	9 September 1968	16 February 1969	160 days	4th (1967 election)	Indian National Congress
(3)		Virendra Sakhlecha	Jawad	20 March 1969	6 January 1970	292 days	4th (1967 election)	Bharatiya Jana Sangh
6		Vasant Sadashiv Pradhan	Dhar	7 January 1970	17 March 1972	2 years, 70 days	4th (1967 election)	Bharatiya Jana Sangh
7		Kailash Chandra Joshi	Bagli	28 March 1972	30 April 1977	5 years, 33 days	5th (1972 election)	Bharatiya Jana Sangh
8		Arjun Singh	Churhat	15 July 1977	17 February 1980	2 years, 217 days	6th (1977 election)	Indian National Congress
9		Sunder Lal Patwa	Sehore	4 July 1980	10 March 1985	4 years, 249 days	7th (1980 election)	Bharatiya Janata Party
(7)		Kailash Chandra Joshi	Bagli	23 March 1985	3 March 1990	4 years, 346 days	8th (1985 election)	Bharatiya Janata Party
(4)		Shyama Charan Shukla	Rajim	20 March 1990	15 December 1992	2 years, 270 days	9th (1990 election)	Indian National Congress
10		Vikram Verma	Dhar	24 December 1993	1 December 1998	4 years, 342 days	10th (1993 election)	Bharatiya Janata Party
11		Gauri Shankar Shejwar	Sanchi	2 February 1999	1 September 2002	3 years, 211 days	11th (1998 election)	Bharatiya Janata Party
12		Babulal Gaur	Govindpura	4 September 2002	5 December 2003	1 year, 92 days	11th (1998 election)	Bharatiya Janata Party
13		Jamuna Devi	Kukshi	16 December 2003	11 December 2008	4 years, 361 days	12th (2003 election)	Indian National Congress
13		Jamuna Devi	Kukshi	7 January 2009	24 September 2010	1 year, 260 days	13th (2008 election)	Indian National Congress
14		Ajay Arjun Singh	Churhat	15 April 2011	10 December 2013	2 years, 239 days	13th (2008 election)	Indian National Congress
15		Satyadev Katare	Ater	9 January 2014	20 October 2016	2 years, 285 days	14th (2013 election)	Indian National Congress
(14)		Ajay Arjun Singh	Churhat	27 February 2017	13 December 2018	1 year, 289 days	14th (2013 election)	Indian National Congress
16		Gopal Bhargava	Rehli	8 January 2019	23 March 2020	1 year, 75 days	15th (2018 election)	Bharatiya Janata Party
17		Kamal Nath	Chhindwara	19 August 2020	29 April 2022	1 year, 253 days	15th (2018 election)	Indian National Congress
18		Govind Singh	Lahar	29 April 2022	4 December 2023	1 year, 231 days	15th (2018 election)	Indian National Congress
19		Umang Singhar	Gandhwani	18 December 2023	Incumbent	2 years, 265 days	16th (2023 election)	Indian National Congress

On 28 April 2022 Kamal Nath has resigned as the Leader of Opposition in the Madhya Pradesh Assembly. All India Congress Committee (AICC) president Sonia Gandhi appointed former minister and senior party MLA from Lahar Govind Singh as Leader of Opposition. After the 2023 Assembly election Aicc president Mallikarjun Kharge appointed Umang Singhar as leader of Opposition.

== Statistics ==
#	Leader of Opposition	Party	Term of office	
#	Leader of Opposition	Party	Longest term	Total duration
1	Kailash Chandra Joshi	ABJS/BJP	5 years, 33 days	10 years, 14 days
2	Jamuna Devi	INC	4 years, 361 days	6 years, 256 days
3	Virendra Kumar Sakhlecha	ABJS	5 years, 112 days	6 years, 39 days
4	Vikram Verma	BJP	4 years, 342 days	4 years, 342 days
5	Sunder Lal Patwa	BJP	4 years, 249 days	4 years, 249 days
6	Chandra Pratap Tiwari	PSP	4 years, 249 days	4 years, 249 days
7	Ajay Arjun Singh	INC	2 years, 239 days	4 years, 163 days
8	Shyama Charan Shukla	INC	2 years, 270 days	3 years, 309 days.
9	Gauri Shankar Shejwar	BJP	3 years, 211 days	3 years, 211 days
10	Satyadev Katare	INC	2 years, 285 days	2 years, 285 days
11	Arjun Singh	INC	2 years, 217 days	2 years, 217 days
12	Umang Singhar*	INC*	2 years, 265 days*	2 years, 265 days*
13	Vasant Sadashiv Pradhan	ABJS	2 years, 70 days	2 years, 70 days
14	Kamal Nath	INC	1 year, 253 days	1 year, 253 days
15	Govind Singh	INC	1 year, 231 days	1 year, 231 days
16	Babulal Gaur	BJP	1 year, 92 days	1 year, 92 days
17	Gopal Bhargava	BJP	1 year, 75 days	1 year, 75 days
18	Dwarka Prasad Mishra	INC	160 days	160 days
19	Vishwanath Tamasker	PSP	72 days	72 days
