= Ghanshyam Singh =

Indian politician

Member of Madhya Pradesh Legislative Assembly
- Incumbent
- Assumed office 3 August 2026
- Preceded by: Rajendra Bharti
- Constituency: Datia
- In office 2018–2023
- Preceded by: Pradeep Agrawal
- Succeeded by: Pradeep Agrawal
- Constituency: Sewda
- In office 2003–2008
- Preceded by: Rajendra Bharti
- Succeeded by: Narottam Mishra
- Constituency: Datia
- In office 1993–1998
- Preceded by: Shambhu Tiwari
- Succeeded by: Rajendra Bharti
- Constituency: Datia

Personal details
- Born: 9 February 1954 (age 72) Datia, Madhya Pradesh, India
- Party: Indian National Congress
- Parent: Maharaj Krishna Singh Judeo (father)
- Profession: Farmer, Politician

Kunwar Ghanshayam Singh is an Indian politician and a leader of the Indian National Congress. He was elected four times as a Member of the Madhya Pradesh Legislative Assembly from the Datia Assembly constituency & Sewda Assembly constituency in 1993, 2003, 2018 and 2026 bypoll election with a margin of 6,016 votes by defeating BJP candidate Ashutosh Tiwari.

== Personal life ==
He come from the Royal family of Datia State he is the son of HH Maharaja Lokendra Krishan Singh Judeo who was Maharaja of Datia and former Member of Parliament representing Bhind Lok Sabha constituency in 1984 election.
