= Prabhuram Choudhary =

Indian politician

Cabinet Minister Madhya Pradesh Government
- In office 2 July 2020 – 2023
- Cabinet: Chouhan IV
- Chief Minister: Shivraj Singh Chouhan
- Ministry & Department's: Ministry of Health and Family Welfare
- Preceded by: Narottam Mishra

Cabinet Minister Madhya Pradesh Government
- In office December 2018 – March 2020
- Cabinet: Nath I
- Chief Minister: Kamal Nath
- Ministry & Department's: Ministry of Education
- Preceded by: Vijay Shah

Member of the Madhya Pradesh Legislative Assembly
- Incumbent
- Assumed office 2020
- Succeeded by: Self
- In office 2018–2020
- Preceded by: Gauri Shankar Shejwar
- In office December 2008 – December 2013
- Preceded by: Gauri Shankar Shejwar
- Succeeded by: Gauri Shankar Shejwar
- In office 1985–1990
- Preceded by: Gauri Shankar Shejwar
- Succeeded by: Gauri Shankar Shejwar
- Constituency: Sanchi

Personal details
- Born: 15 July 1958 (age 67) Village Mala, Raisen district
- Party: Bharatiya Janata Party (2020 onwards)
- Other political affiliations: Indian National Congress (1985–2020)
- Spouse: Dr Neera Choudhary
- Children: 3, Parv Kumar Choudhary, Ronak Choudhary
- Parent: (Late) Shri Balmukund Choudhary (father)
- Education: M.B.B.S. Doctor
- Alma mater: Gandhi Medical College, Bhopal, Govt. Motilal Vigyan Mahavidyalaya (MVM), Bhopal
- Profession: Politics, business and agriculture
- Website: https://prabhuramchoudhary.in/

Prabhuram Choudhary is an Indian politician and a member of Bharatiya Janata Party. He is a Member of Madhya Pradesh Legislative Assembly from Sanchi in Raisen District and currently serving as Public Health and Family Welfare minister of Madhya Pradesh in Shivraj Singh Chouhan's 2020 Cabinet.

== Early life and education ==
Prabhuram Chaudhary was born on 15 July 1958 in Mala village of Raisen district. Son of Shri Balmukand Chaudhary, Prabhuram Choudhary received MBBS education. His main occupation is agriculture and trade. Choudhary has special interest in sports. He has been the "Games and Sports" Secretary of Gandhi Medical College, Bhopal and captain of their Volleyball team.

== Political career ==
At the age of 27, Choudhary was elected Member of the 8th Legislative Assembly for the first time in the year 1985 and was a Parliamentary Secretary in 1989, becoming one of the youngest members at that time. Continuing his political career he later became the member of the Madhya Pradesh Congress Committee's Executive body in the year 1991, Joint Secretary in the year 1996 and the General Secretary in the year 1998. Choudhary was also convener of the Scheduled Caste and Scheduled Tribe Division of Madhya Pradesh Congress Committee and member of All India Congress Committee in 1994. He was a member of the Central Co-operative Bank, Raisen and a member of District Panchayat Raisen in 2004.

Choudhary was elected as member of the Assembly for the second time in the year 2008. He was elected for the third time for the Vidhan Sabha from Sanchi assembly constituency in 2018.

== Positions held ==
Prabhuram Choudhary has held the following political and organisational positions.

#	From	To	Position	Party
1	2023	Incumbent	MLA (5th term) from Sanchi	BJP
2	2020	2023	Cabinet Minister, Government of Madhya Pradesh	BJP
3	2020	2023	MLA (4th term) from Sanchi	BJP
4	December 2018	March 2020	Education Minister,Government of Madhya Pradesh	INC
5	2018	2020	MLA (3rd term) from Sanchi	INC
6	December 2008	December 2013	MLA (2nd term) from Sanchi	INC
7	1985	1990	MLA (1st term) from Sanchi	INC

== See also ==
- 2020 Madhya Pradesh political crisis
