= Gandhwani =

Town in Madhya Pradesh, India

- Town
- Location in Madhya Pradesh, India
- Coordinates: 22.33°N 75.02°E
- Country: India
- State: Madhya Pradesh
- District: Dhar District

Languages
  - Official: Hindi
- PIN: 454446
- Vehicle registration: MP-11

Gandhwani is a town and a Nagar Parishad in Dhar District of Madhya Pradesh. It's a Tehsil Headquarter and Development block in District.

Gandhwani is one of the 230 Vidhan Sabha (Legislative Assembly) constituencies of Madhya Pradesh state in central India. As of 2023, its representative is Umang Singhar of the Indian National Congress.

== Geography ==
Gandhwani is located on 22.33°N 75.02°E. It is located 559 m (1,834 ft) above sea level. it's 60 km away from Dhar and 125 km away from Indore.

== Demographics ==
As population Census of India 2011 Gandhwani town has population of 7,885 of which 4,016 are males while 3,869 are females.

In 2011 literacy rate of Gandhwani town was 75.34 %. In Gandhwani Male literacy stands at 83.57 % while female literacy rate was 66.90 %.
