= Govind Singh =

Former member of Madhya Pradesh legislative assembly

Dr. Govind Singh
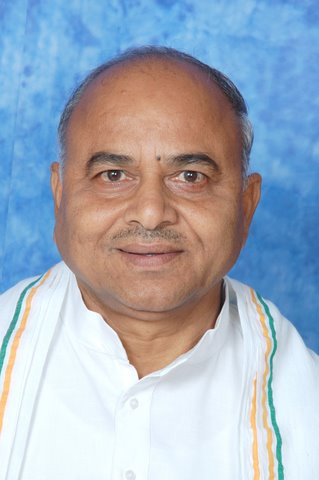

Leader of Opposition, Madhya Pradesh Legislative Assembly
- In office 29 April 2022 – 4 December 2023
- Preceded by: Kamal Nath
- Succeeded by: Umang Singhar

Member of the Madhya Pradesh Legislative Assembly
- In office 1990–2023
- Preceded by: Mathura Prasad Mahant
- Succeeded by: Ambrish Sharma
- Constituency: Lahar

Vice President Madhya Pradesh Congress Committee
- Incumbent
- Assumed office 24 March 2008
- President: Kamal Nath; Arun Yadav; Kantilal Bhuria; Suresh Pachouri

Minister of Cooperatives, Parliamentary affairs and General administration Government of Madhya Pradesh
- In office December 2018 – March 2020
- Chief Minister: Kamal Nath

Personal details
- Born: 1 July 1951 (age 75) Vaishpura, Madhya Bharat, India
- Party: INC (1993–present)
- Other political affiliations: Janata Dal (1990–1993)
- Spouse: Suman Singh
- Children: 1 Son & 1 Daughter
- Parent: Thakur Mathura Singh (father)
- Education: B.A.M.S.
- Alma mater: Government Ayurvedic College, Jabalpur
- As of 23 July, 2018 Source: ["Biography" (PDF). Vidhan Sabha, Madhya Pradesh Legislative Assembly.]

Govind Singh (born 1 July 1951) is an Indian politician from the INC. On 28 April 2022 Kamal Nath resigned as the Leader of Opposition in the Madhya Pradesh Assembly. All India Congress Committee (AICC) president Sonia Gandhi appointed former minister and senior party MLA from Lahar Govind Singh as Leader of Opposition. He served as the Minister of Cooperatives, Parliamentary affairs and General administration in Government of Madhya Pradesh under Chief Minister Kamal Nath between December 2018 and March 2020.

He has served as a minister in the state government of Madhya Pradesh and as a senior Indian National Congress (INC) party leader. Singh has held various ministerial posts since his first such appointment in December 1998. He is a member of Madhya Pradesh Legislative Assembly for Lahar, since 1990 having been returned to the Assembly seven consecutive times and is both a vice-president of the Madhya Pradesh Congress Committee and member of the All India Congress Committee.

Dr. Govind Singh was elected for the seventh consecutive time to the 15th Legislative Assembly of Madhya Pradesh in 2018 and taken charge of Cabinet Minister of Department of General Administration, Parliamentary Affairs and Cooperatives in Government of Madhya Pradesh.

== Political career ==
Dr. Singh was elected Magazine Secretary in the year 1971–72 and President of Students Union of Government Ayurveda College in the year 1974–75 and member of Jabalpur University Students Union Executive Council. Dr. Singh was elected president of the Sahakari Vipanan Sanstha, Maryadit, Lahar from 1979 to 1982 and in 1984–85.

Dr. Govind Singh was Director of District Cooperative Land Development Bank, Bhind from 1984 to 1986 and Chairman of Nagar Palika Parishad, Lahar from 1985 to 1987.

Dr. Govind Singh was elected member of the 9th Legislative Assembly for the first time in 1990. After this, he was elected as a member of the 10th Assembly in the year 1993, 11th Assembly in 1998, 12th Assembly in the year 2003, 13th Assembly in the year 2008, 14th Assembly in the year 2013 and 15th Assembly in 2018.

In addition to this, Dr. Singh has been a member of the Jawaharlal Nehru Agricultural University's Board of Directors, from June 1994 to June 1997 and member of the Assembly's Committee on Petitions in 1996–97, 1997–98 until 31 December 1998, besides being the Director of M.P. State Cooperative Land Development Bank from April 1997.

After being elected a member of the 11th Assembly in the year 1998, he was Minister of State for Home from 6 December 1998, Minister of State for Cooperatives (Independent Charge) from 26 April 2000 and Minister of Cooperatives Department from 12 August 2002.

Dr. Singh was Director of Madhya Pradesh Rajya Sahakari Vipanan Sangh Maryadit from 10 January 2001, to 9 February 2002, Director of Madhya Pradesh State Cooperative Agriculture and Rural Development Bank from 10 December 2001 to 2 January 2002, President of State Co-operative Housing Association from 28 March 2002, Director of Indian National Cooperative Housing Association, New Delhi from 5 August 2002, and in October 2002 he went to China and Hong Kong to participate in the 7th General Assembly of Singapore and Parliament on Population and Development and I.C.A Regional Assembly. From 1995 to date he has been the member of the Pradesh Congress Committee and of the All India Congress Committee from year 2005 and was vice president of Madhya Pradesh Congress Committee from 24 March 2008 to date. Dr. Singh was elected member of the 12th Legislative Assembly in 2003 and has been the Chief Whip of the Congress Legislature Party. On being elected member of the 13th Assembly in 2008, he was the chairman, Public Accounts Committee from 2009 to 2011. Dr. Singh was elected as the member of the Assembly for the 6th time in the year 2013.

== Anti-Discrimination ==
He has stood firm based upon his Constitutionalist stance, against such Islamophobic Conspiracy theories such as Love Jihad, that has been peddled by Hindutva supremacist organizations and individuals, including Madhya Pradesh CM Shivraj Singh Chouhan of the BJP in 2022.

== Madhya Pradesh Legislative Assembly ==
SI No.	Year	Legislative Assembly	Constituency	Margin	Party	Post
1.	1990	9th	Lahar	14,617	JD	
2.	1993	10th	Lahar	7,822	INC	
3.	1998	11th	Lahar	6,086	INC	Minister of State
4.	2003	12th	Lahar	4,085	INC	Chief Whip of the Congress Legislative Party (CLP)
5.	2008	13th	Lahar	4,878	INC	Chairmen of the Public Accounts Committee (PAC)
6.	2013	14th	Lahar	6,273	INC	
7.	2018	15th	Lahar	9,073	INC	Cabinet Minister, later Leader of Opposition

== Awards and recognition ==
Dr.Govind Singh awarded as best MLA by Jagran Group in December 2017.
