= Lahar Assembly constituency =

Constituency of the Madhya Pradesh legislative assembly in India

Coordinates: 26.19°N 78.94°E

Lahar
- Constituency No. 11 for the Madhya Pradesh Legislative Assembly

Constituency details
- Country: India
- Region: Central India
- State: Madhya Pradesh
- District: Bhind
- Lok Sabha constituency: Bhind
- Established: 1951
- Reservation: None

Member of Legislative Assembly
- 16th Madhya Pradesh Legislative Assembly
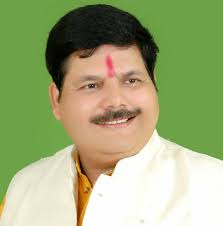
- Incumbent Ambrish Sharma
- Party: Bharatiya Janta Party
- Elected year: 2023
- Preceded by: Govind Singh

Lahar Assembly constituency is one of the 230 Vidhan Sabha (Legislative Assembly) constituencies of Madhya Pradesh state in central India. This constituency came into existence in 1951, as one of the 79 Vidhan Sabha constituencies of the erstwhile Madhya Bharat state.

== Overview ==
Lahar (constituency number 11) is one of the 5 Vidhan Sabha constituencies located in Bhind district. This constituency covers the entire Mihona and Lahar tehsils and part of Raun tehsil.

Lahar is part of Bhind Lok Sabha constituency along with seven other Vidhan Sabha segments, namely, Ater, Bhind, Mehgaon and Gohad in this district and Sewda, Bhander and Datia in Datia district.

== Members of Legislative Assembly ==
Madhya Bharat
Election	Member	Party
1951	Har Sevak Gokul Prasad	Indian National Congress

Madhya Pradesh Legislative Assembly
Election	Member	Party
1957	Premkumari Ranvijay Singh	Indian National Congress
1962	Prabhudayal	Indian National Congress
1967	Saryu Prasad Tripathi	Bharatiya Jana Sangh
1972	Raghavram Chaudhary	Indian National Congress
1977	Rama Shankar Singh	Janata Party
1980	Rama Shankar Chowdhary	Indian National Congress
1985	Mathura Prasad Mahant	Bharatiya Janata Party
1990	Govind Singh	Janata Dal
1993	Govind Singh	Indian National Congress
1998	Govind Singh	Indian National Congress
2003	Govind Singh	Indian National Congress
2008	Govind Singh	Indian National Congress
2013	Govind Singh	Indian National Congress
2018	Govind Singh	Indian National Congress
2023	Ambrish Sharma	Bharatiya Janata Party

== Election results ==
=== 2023 ===
2023 Madhya Pradesh Legislative Assembly election: Lahar
Party	Candidate	Votes	%	±%
BJP	Ambrish Sharma	75,347	42.87	+8.62
INC	Govind Singh	62,950	35.82	−4.29
BSP	Rasal Singh	31,348	17.84	−2.42
NOTA	None of the above	1,556	0.89	+0.67
Majority		12,397	7.05	+1.19
Turnout		175,747	67.58	+4.15
BJP gain from INC		Swing		

=== 2018 ===
2018 Madhya Pradesh Legislative Assembly election: Lahar
Party	Candidate	Votes	%	±%
INC	Govind Singh	62,113	40.11	
BJP	Rasal Singh	53,040	34.25	
BSP	Ambrish Sharma	31,367	20.26	
Independent	Ramkumar	1,565	1.01	
NOTA	None of the above	345	0.22	
Majority		9,073	5.86	
Turnout		154,845	63.43	
INC hold		Swing		

== See also ==
- Lahar
