= Datia Assembly constituency =

Assembly constituency in Madhya Pradesh

Coordinates: 25.67°N 78.45°E

Datia
- Constituency No. 22 for the Madhya Pradesh Legislative Assembly

Constituency details
- Country: India
- Region: Central India
- State: Madhya Pradesh
- District: Datia
- Lok Sabha constituency: Bhind
- Established: 1951
- Reservation: None

Member of Legislative Assembly
- 16th Madhya Pradesh Legislative Assembly
- Incumbent Ghanshyam Singh
- Party: Indian National Congress
- Elected year: 2026

Datia Assembly constituency is one of the 230 Vidhan Sabha (Legislative Assembly) constituencies of Madhya Pradesh state in central India. This constituency came into existence in 1951, as one of the 48 Vidhan Sabha constituencies of the erstwhile Vindhya Pradesh state.

== Overview ==
Datia (constituency number 22) is one of the 3 Vidhan Sabha constituencies located in Datia district. This constituency covers the entire Datia Municipality and part of Datia tehsil of the district.

Datia is part of Bhind Lok Sabha constituency along with seven other Vidhan Sabha segments, namely, Bhander and Sewda in this district and Bhind, Ater, Lahar, Mehgaon and Gohad in Bhind district.

== Members of Legislative Assembly ==
Vindhya Pradesh
Year	Member	Party
1952	Shyam Sunder Shyam	Indian National Congress

Madhya Pradesh Legislative Assembly
Year	Member	Party
1957	Shyam Sunder Shyam	Indian National Congress
1962	Pandit Surya Deo Sharma	Independent politician
1967	Shyam Sunder Shyam	Jana Congress
1972	Gulab Chand Kanoolal	Bharatiya Jana Sangh
1977	Shyam Sunder Shyam	Indian National Congress
1980	Shyam Sunder Shyam	Indian National Congress
1985	Rajendra Kumar Bharti	Indian National Congress
1990	Shambhu Tiwari	Bharatiya Janata Party
1993	Kunwar Ghanshyam Singh	Indian National Congress
1998	Rajendra Kumar Bharti	Samajwadi Party
2003	Kunwar Ghanshyam Singh	Indian National Congress
2008	Narottam Mishra	Bharatiya Janata Party
2013	Narottam Mishra	Bharatiya Janata Party
2018	Narottam Mishra	Bharatiya Janata Party
2023	Rajendra Kumar Bharti	Indian National Congress
2026^	Kunwar Ghanshyam Singh	Indian National Congress

== Election results ==
=== 2026 by-election ===
2026 Madhya Pradesh Legislative Assembly by-election: Datia
Party	Candidate	Votes	%	±%
INC	Kunwar Ghanshyam Singh	66,757	42.39	
BJP	Ashutosh Tiwari	60,741	38.57	
ASP(KR)	Damodar Singh Yadav	22,527	14.3	
NOTA	None of the above	456	0.29	
Majority		6,016	3.82	
Turnout		157,499	71.4	
INC hold		Swing		

=== 2023 ===
2023 Madhya Pradesh Legislative Assembly election: Datia
Party	Candidate	Votes	%	±%
INC	Rajendra Bharti	88,977	50.34%	
BJP	Narottam Mishra	81,235	45.96%	
NOTA	None of the above	1,452	0.82%	
Majority		7,742	4.38%	
Turnout		176,759	80.2%	
INC gain from BJP		Swing	4.38	

=== 2018 ===
2018 Madhya Pradesh Legislative Assembly election: Datia
Party	Candidate	Votes	%	±%
BJP	Narottam Mishra	72,209	49.0	
INC	Rajendra Bharti	69,553	47.2	
NOTA	None of the above	2,085	1.41	
Majority		2,656	1.8	
Turnout		147,370	77.2	
BJP hold		Swing		

== See also ==
- Datia
