= Shyam Sundar Shyam =

Indian politician (1923–1985)

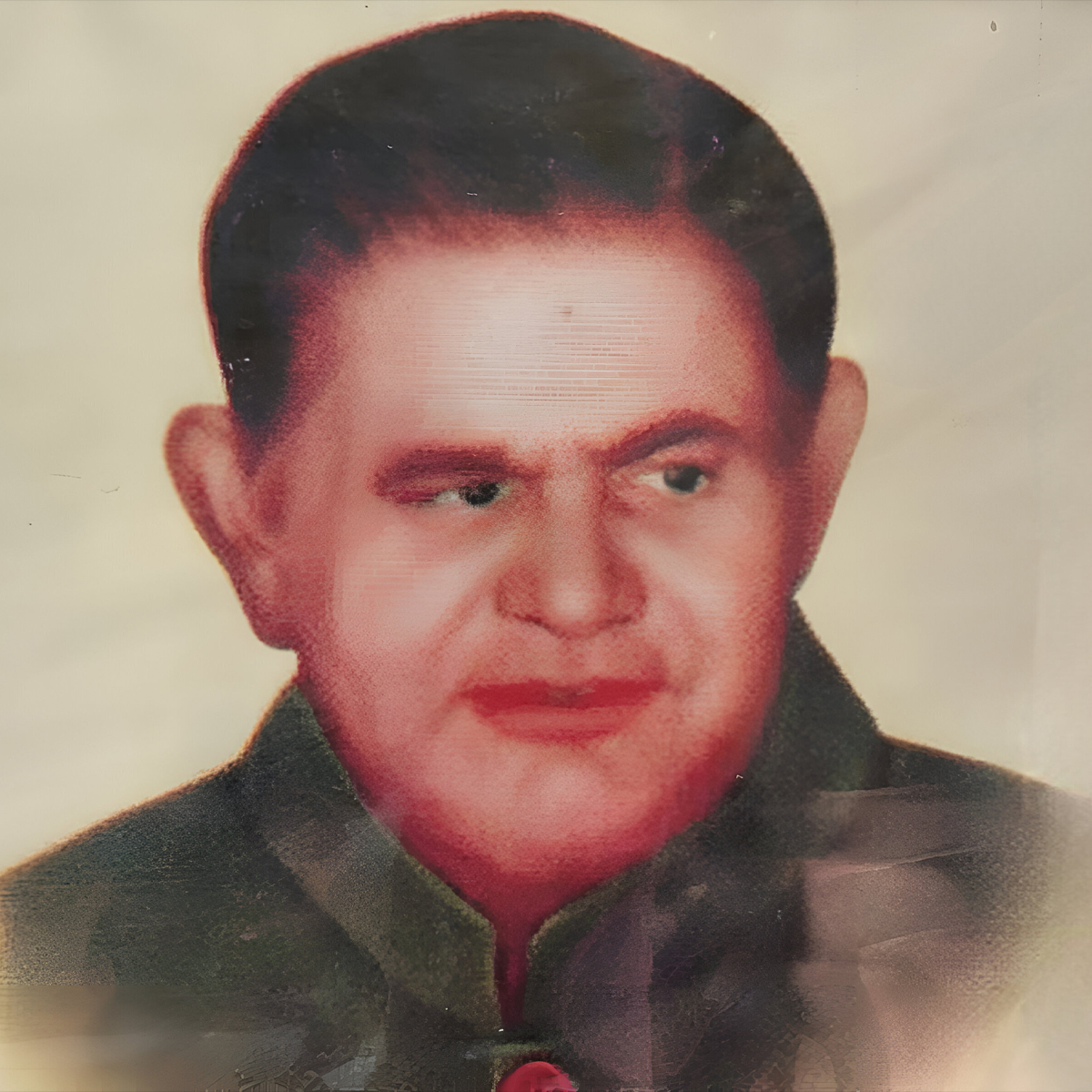
- Official portrait, 1985

Deputy Speaker of Vindhya Pradesh
- In office 1952–1957
- Preceded by: Office established
- Succeeded by: Office dissolved

Member of the Madhya Pradesh Legislative Assembly
- In office 1977–1985
- Preceded by: Gulab Chand Kanoolal
- Succeeded by: Rajendra Bharti
- Constituency: Datia
- In office 1967–1972
- Preceded by: Pandit Surya Deo Sharma
- Succeeded by: Gulab Chand Kanoolal
- In office 1957–1962
- Preceded by: Constituency established
- Succeeded by: Pandit Surya Deo Sharma

Personal details
- Born: 7 December 1923 Datia, Bundelkhand Agency, British India (present-day Madhya Pradesh, India)
- Died: 2 February 1985 (aged 61) New Delhi, India
- Party: Indian National Congress
- Spouse: Savitri Shyam (m. 1941)
- Children: 9 (including Rajendra Bharti)
- Parent(s): Murlidhar (father); Brij Rani (mother)
- Education: Agra University(B.A.) (L.L.B)
- Occupation: Activist, Lawyer, Politician

Shyam Sundar Shyam (7 December 1923 – 2 February 1985) was a prominent leader of the Indian National Congress and a significant political figure of Madhya Pradesh and Vindhya Pradesh. He is notably recognized as the first Member of the Legislative Assembly (MLA) from Datia.

== Personal life ==
Shyam Sundar Shyam was born in Datia Madhya Pradesh. He started his career in politics with Indian National Congress He then filed several elections of the Vidhan Sabha of Datia and became the first elected Member of Legislative Assembly (MLA) from Datia. After Shyam Sundar Shyam's death on February 2, 1985, his son Rajendra Bharti contested the election from Datia and won.

== Early life and education ==
Shyam Sundar Shyam was born into a family with a strong educational background. His grandfather, Mathura Prasad, was a businessman under British rule. His father, Shri Murlidhar, was a well-known geography teacher at Lord Reading High School in Datia and mother Brijrani was a housewife. Shyam Sundar Shyam married Savitri Shyam in 1941, and together they had nine children. Shyam's academic journey began at home, followed by education at the Hindi Middle School in Allahabad and high school in Datia, where he graduated in 1940. He pursued higher studies at Government Inter College, Jhansi (1942), and later completed his B.A. and LL.B. from Agra University. In 1955, he served as a teacher in Datia High School before being promoted to Deputy Education Inspector.

A multi-faceted personality, Shyam Sundar Shyam excelled in various fields during his student life, including literature, music, hockey and public service. His involvement in the 1942 national movement led to his arrest, marking the beginning of his lifelong commitment to public service. At the time of arrest of Indira Gandhi in 1978 he was arrested again, this time alongside his son Rajendra Bharti, who later became an MLA from Datia.

== Political career ==
Shyam Sundar Shyam was an active participant in the Quit India Movement, a significant part of India's struggle for independence from British rule. While employed in a government job in Datia, Madhya Pradesh, Shyam Sundar joined the movement and, along with Narayan Khare, went underground for 34 days to evade British authorities.

During this time, Shyam Sundar traveled from village to village, spreading Mahatma Gandhi's message of non-violent resistance and civil disobedience. His dedication to the cause played a crucial role in mobilizing support for the Quit India Movement in 1942, contributing to the broader effort to end British colonial rule in India.

Shyam Sundar Shyam first contested an election in 1952 and won consecutively, serving as an MLA from 1952 to 1957 and then again from 1957 to 1962. He later served three more terms from 1967 to 1972, 1977 to 1980 and from 1980 to 1985. He was also the vice president of the Vindhya Pradesh Vidhan Sabha, with the first meeting held on April 21, 1952, and held various key positions, including membership in the Bundelkhand Congress Committee, the V.P.C.C. Executive, and as an observer for the Madhya Pradesh Congress Committee during the 1962 elections and in 1969-70 also chosen as the leader of pragati-sheel dal.

Elected to the Vidhan Sabha in 1952, Shyam Sundar Shyam served as Deputy Speaker of the Vindhya Pradesh Assembly. He chaired several important committees, including the Public Accounts Committee, the Estimates Committee and the Committee of Privileges. His tenure saw significant contributions to legislative procedures and governance, earning him respect and admiration across the political spectrum. His other notable roles included being a member of the Rajya Praja Mandal (1942–43), the Bundelkhand Congress Committee (1948–49) and serving as the first administrator of Datia. Additionally, he was a political advisor to the prime minister of Vindhya Pradesh in 1948-49 and being a pioneer for bringing the Rajghat Project in 1977 to benefit the folk of Datia.

== Progressive politics ==
Shyam Sundar was elected as the chairman of the Progressive Legislative Group in the Madhya Pradesh Vidhan Sabha for the session 1969-70. In this role, he championed the cause of social justice, economic upliftment and the progress of suppressed communities. His leadership was marked by a strong stance against feudalism, reflecting his commitment to democracy, socialism and secularism. He once stated, "We are committed to the cause of democracy, socialism and secularism. Our primary duty is to eradicate feudalism." The late 1960s were a period of significant political realignment in India, marked by the emergence of the Progressive Vidhayak Dal (PVD). Under Shyam Sundar's leadership, the PVD was established as a counterforce to Rajmata Scindia's faction, advocating for democracy, socialism and secularism. The PVD was a diverse coalition, comprising legislators from various backgrounds, including defectors from the Rajmata group and the Jana Sangh. This diversity reflected the PVD's broader appeal and its commitment to progressive political change. Shyam Sundar's leadership within the PVD was instrumental in opposing feudalism and promoting social justice and economic upliftment for the people of Madhya Pradesh. His dedication to these causes was evident in his political career, particularly during the 1977 Vidhan Sabha elections, a time when the Janta Party was on the rise. Despite the political wave, Shyam Sundar's unwavering commitment to his constituents led to his election to the Vidhan Sabha four times, consistently securing the trust and support of the people.

== Literary contributions ==
An accomplished writer, Shyam Sundar Shyam penned articles and poems in Hindi, Sanskrit and English. He edited the Hindi weekly "Desh-Ke-Yuvak" and was actively involved in the Hindi Sahitya Sammelan Executive. His contributions extended to the cooperative sector, where he served as secretary and held the presidency of the Jila Bhumi Vikas Bank and was a member of the Jila Sahkari Bank in Datia.

== Contributions to journalism and media ==
Beyond his political endeavours, Shyam Sundar had a significant and impactful career in journalism and media. He contributed extensively as a journalist for the Indian News Chronicle and Janasatta, where his articles and news reviews were regularly published. Journalism was not just a profession for Shyam Sundar; it was a vital means through which he communicated important issues to the public, helping to shape public opinion and inform society.

His commitment to journalism extended further when he became one of the founders of the People's Press of India, a news agency established in the late 1940s. Shyam Sundar recognized the critical role that the press plays in shaping public opinion and holding leaders accountable. His journalistic efforts were not merely about reporting the news but were also integral to his political strategy. The media platform he helped create enabled him to popularize the political initiatives and actions he believed in, thereby reinforcing his influence in both journalism and politics.

== Legacy ==
Shyam Sundar Shyam's legacy is one of unwavering commitment to democracy, social justice and public service. His relentless efforts to champion the rights of the poor and marginalised left an indelible mark on the political landscape of Madhya Pradesh. A staunch supporter of Indira Gandhi, he played a crucial role in her political campaigns, even facing arrest for his activism.

Shyam Sundar Shyam's life was a testament to his dedication to the principles of democracy, secularism and socialism. His death in 1985 marked the end of an era, but his contributions continue to inspire future generations of leaders committed to the betterment of society. His legacy is carried forward by his elder son, Rajendra Bharti, who has served three terms as the MLA of Datia. His younger son, Ravi Chaurasia was the member of the AICC and a former member of Madhya Pradesh Pollution Board. His daughter-in-law, Savita Bajpai, was a minister of Madhya Pradesh.

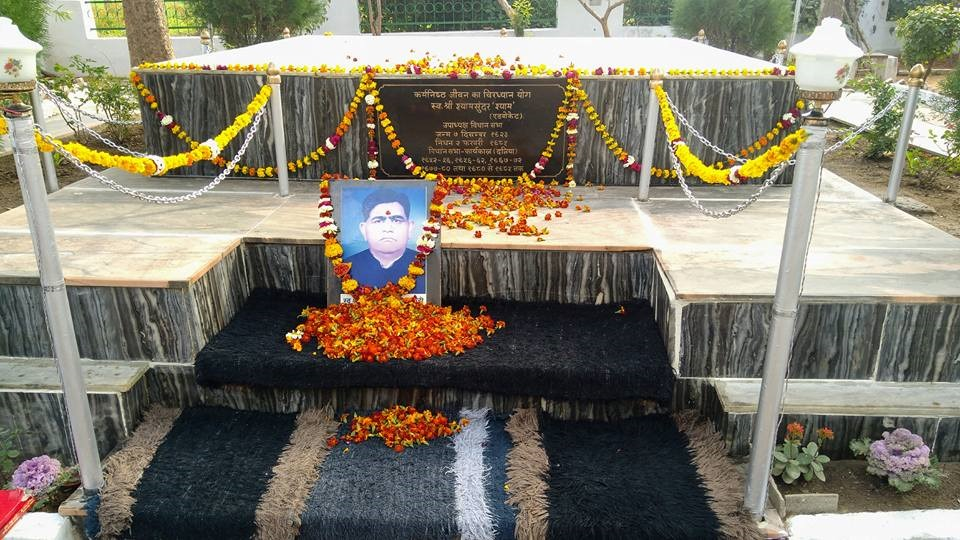
Samadhi Site at Shyam Vatika, Datia
