= Rajendra Bharti =

Indian politician

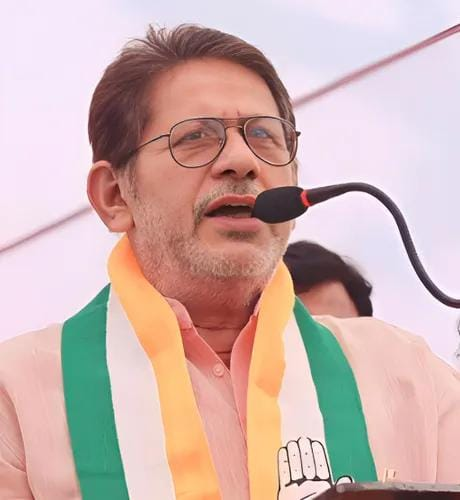

Member of Madhya Pradesh Legislative Assembly
- In office 3 December 2023 – 2 April 2026
- Preceded by: Narottam Mishra
- Succeeded by: Ghanshyam Singh
- Constituency: Datia
- In office 1998–2003
- Preceded by: Ghanshyam Singh
- Succeeded by: Ghanshyam Singh
- In office 1985–1990
- Preceded by: Shyam Sundar Shyam
- Succeeded by: Shambhu Tiwari

Personal details
- Born: 30 May 1958 (age 68) Datia, Madhya Pradesh, India
- Party: Indian National Congress 1984 - 2026
- Spouse: Shobha Bharti (m. 1986)
- Children: 3
- Parent: Shyam Sundar Shyam (father)
- Education: Jiwaji University (B.A.); Dr. Hari Singh Gour University (L.L.B)
- Profession: Advocate, Politician

Rajendra Kumar Bharti is an Indian politician and a leader of the Indian National Congress. He has been elected thrice as a Member of the Madhya Pradesh Legislative Assembly from the Datia Vidhansabha constituency, in 1985, 1998 and 2023 he serving as a member of the 16th Madhya Pradesh Assembly from the Datia Vidhan Sabha till April 2026.

== Personal life ==
Rajendra Bharti was born in Datia, Madhya Pradesh. He earned his Bachelor of Arts and Bachelor of Laws degrees, completing his graduation. Professionally, he is an advocate and politician. His father, Shyam Sundar Shyam, was a five-term MLA from Datia, Madhya Pradesh a freedom fighter, and a renowned socio-political figure in Madhya Pradesh.

== Political career ==
Rajendra Bharti embarked on his political journey as a youth volunteer within the Congress party, during the tenure of his father, Shyam Sundar Shyam, who served as a Member of the Legislative Assembly (MLA). His active involvement led him to make substantial contributions to the Congress Sevadal, where he ascended to the position of President in the District Congress Committee in Datia.

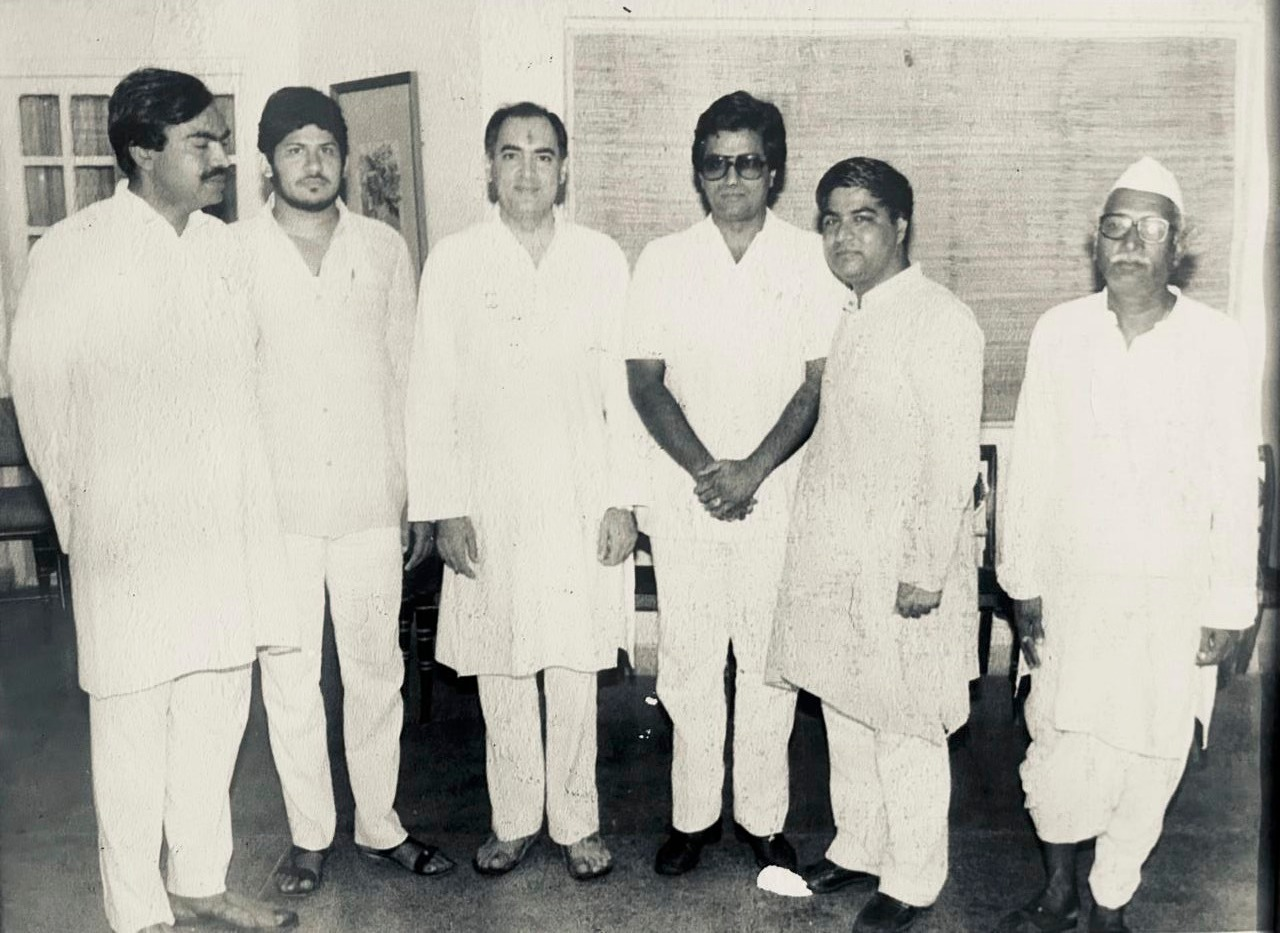
Rajendra Bharti with The Prime Minister Rajiv Gandhi in 1985

Bharti has participated in Eight elections spanning from 1985 to the present. Notably, he emerged victorious in three of these elections, securing his seat in 1985, 1998, and 2023. From 1984 to 2000, Rajendra Bharti served as the Chairman of the Agricultural Rural Development Bank in Datia, playing a crucial role in the economic development of the region. Additionally, he held the esteemed position of Vice-Chairman of the State Cooperative Agricultural Development Bank of Madhya Pradesh from 1997 to 2003.

In 1997, he travelled to Paris, England, Austria, the Netherlands, Italy, and Germany for research purposes.In 1978, he was elected General Secretary in the direct elections held in Government College Datia. Throughout his political career, Rajendra Bharti faced several challenges. He was arrested multiple times, notably in 1978 at the time of arrest of Indira Gandhi, he went to jail along with his father Late Shri Shyam Sundar Shyam, a freedom fighter and Deputy Speaker of Vindhya Pradesh and also between 1990 and 1992, and served time in jail for his activism. From 1991 to 1996, he was the President of the District Congress Committee (DCC).

== Controversy ==
In 2008, Rajendra Bharti filed a case, alleging paid news against the former Home Minister of Madhya Pradesh, Narottam Mishra, which resulted in Narottam Mishra being suspended from the legislative body.. Mishra's suspension was eventually overturned by the Delhi High Court, and the high court order was subsequently upheld by the Supreme Court of India.The matter remains undecided in the supreme court, as of August 2026..

On 3 April 2026, Rajendra Bharti was sentenced to 3 years of imprisonment for defrauding a bank, in a 2015 case, by a special court in Delhi. This resulted in his disqualification as an MLA.
