= Mahendra Boudh =

Indian politician

Member of the Madhya Pradesh Legislative Assembly
- In office 1998–2003
- Preceded by: Ram Dayal Prabhakar
- Succeeded by: Ram Dayal Prabhakar
- In office 1985–1993
- Preceded by: Mangal Singh
- Succeeded by: Ram Dayal Prabhakar
- Constituency: Sewda

Home Minister, Govt. of Madhya Pradesh
- In office 1998–2003
- Chief Minister: Digvijay Singh

Personal details
- Born: Datia district, Madhya Pradesh, India
- Party: Indian National Congress
- Other political affiliations: Bahujan Samaj Party
- Occupation: Politician

Mahendra Boudh is an Indian politician from the state of Madhya Pradesh. He is associated mainly with the Sewda Assembly constituency in Datia district. Belonging to the Scheduled Caste (Jatav community), he has been active in state politics for several decades and has been associated with the Indian National Congress and the Bahujan Samaj Party

== Political career ==
Mahendra Boudh began his political career with the Indian National Congress. He was elected as a Member of the Madhya Pradesh Legislative Assembly from the Sewda constituency on a Congress ticket. He was elected as MLA three times during the 1980s and 1990s.

== Ministerial career ==
During his tenure in state politics, Mahendra Boudh served as the Home Minister of Madhya Pradesh.

== Party affiliations ==
After spending several years with the Indian National Congress, Mahendra Boudh later joined the Bahujan Samaj Party. In 2023, ahead of the Madhya Pradesh Legislative Assembly elections, he returned to the Indian National Congress along with his supporters.

== See also ==
- Sewda Assembly constituency
- Madhya Pradesh Legislative Assembly
- Indian National Congress
- Bahujan Samaj Party
