= Sewda Assembly constituency =

Assembly constituency in Madhya Pradesh

Coordinates: 26.15°N 78.78°E

Sewda
- Constituency No. 20 for the Madhya Pradesh Legislative Assembly

Constituency details
- Country: India
- Region: Central India
- State: Madhya Pradesh
- District: Datia
- Lok Sabha constituency: Bhind
- Established: 1951
- Reservation: None

Member of Legislative Assembly
- 16th Madhya Pradesh Legislative Assembly
- Incumbent Pradeep Agrawal
- Party: BJP
- Elected year: 2023
- Preceded by: Kunwar Ghansyam Singh

Sewda Assembly constituency (formerly, Seondha) is one of the 230 Vidhan Sabha (Legislative Assembly) constituencies of Madhya Pradesh state in central India. This constituency came into existence in 1951, as one of the 48 Vidhan Sabha constituencies of the erstwhile Vindhya Pradesh state. It was reserved for the candidates belonging to the Scheduled castes till 2008.

== Overview ==
Sewda (constituency number 20) is one of the 3 Vidhan Sabha constituencies located in Datia district. This constituency covers the entire Sewda tehsil of the district.

Sewda is part of Bhind Lok Sabha constituency along with seven other Vidhan Sabha segments, namely, Bhander and Datia in this district and Bhind, Ater, Lahar, Mehgaon and Gohad in Bhind district.

== Members of Legislative Assembly ==
Vindhya Pradesh
| Year | Member | Party |
|---|---|---|
| 1951 | Ram Das | Indian National Congress |
| 1951 | Laxmi Narayan Mahate | Indian National Congress |

Madhya Pradesh Legislative Assembly
| Year | Member | Party |
|---|---|---|
| 1972 | Shiv Charan | Indian National Congress |
| 1977 | Tulsi Ram Dangi | Janata Party |
| 1980 | Mangal Singh | Indian National Congress (Indira) |
| 1985 | Mahendra Boudh | Indian National Congress |
| 1990 | Mahendra Boudh | Indian National Congress |
| 1993 | Ram Dayal Prabhakar | Bharatiya Janata Party |
| 1998 | Mahendra Boudh | Indian National Congress |
| 2003 | Ram Dayal Prabhakar | Bharatiya Janata Party |
| 2008 | Radhelal Baghel | Bahujan Samaj Party |
| 2013 | Pradeep Agrawal | Bharatiya Janata Party |
| 2018 | Kunwar Ghanshyam Singh | Indian National Congress |
| 2023 | Pradeep Agrawal | Bharatiya Janata Party |

== Election results ==
=== 2023 ===
2023 Madhya Pradesh Legislative Assembly election: Sewda
| Party | Candidate | Votes | % | ±% |
|---|---|---|---|---|
| BJP | Pradeep Agrawal | 43,834 | 31.14 | +5.49 |
| INC | Kunwar Ghanshyam Singh | 41,276 | 29.32 | −23.39 |
| ASP(KR) | Damodar Singh-Yadav | 29,042 | 20.63 | |
| BSP | Lakhan Singh Yadav | 12,787 | 9.08 | −5.56 |
| AAP | Dubey Sanjay | 7,746 | 5.5 | +3.49 |
| NOTA | None of the above | 293 | 0.21 | −1.22 |
| Majority | | 2,558 | 1.82 | −25.24 |
| Turnout | | 140,768 | 73.33 | +1.75 |
| BJP gain from INC | | Swing | | |

=== 2018 ===
2018 Madhya Pradesh Legislative Assembly election: Sewda
| Party | Candidate | Votes | % | ±% |
|---|---|---|---|---|
| INC | Kunwar Ghanshyam Singh | 64,810 | 52.71 | |
| BJP | Radhelal Baghel | 31,542 | 25.65 | |
| BSP | Lakhan Singh Yadav | 18,006 | 14.64 | |
| AAP | Parineeta Raje (Beti Raja) | 2,472 | 2.01 | |
| NOTA | None of the above | 1,753 | 1.43 | |
| Majority | | 33,268 | 27.06 | |
| Turnout | | 122,954 | 71.58 | |
| INC gain from | | Swing | | |

== See also ==
- Seondha
- Ratangarh, Datia
- Datia district
