= Narmada Seva Yatra =

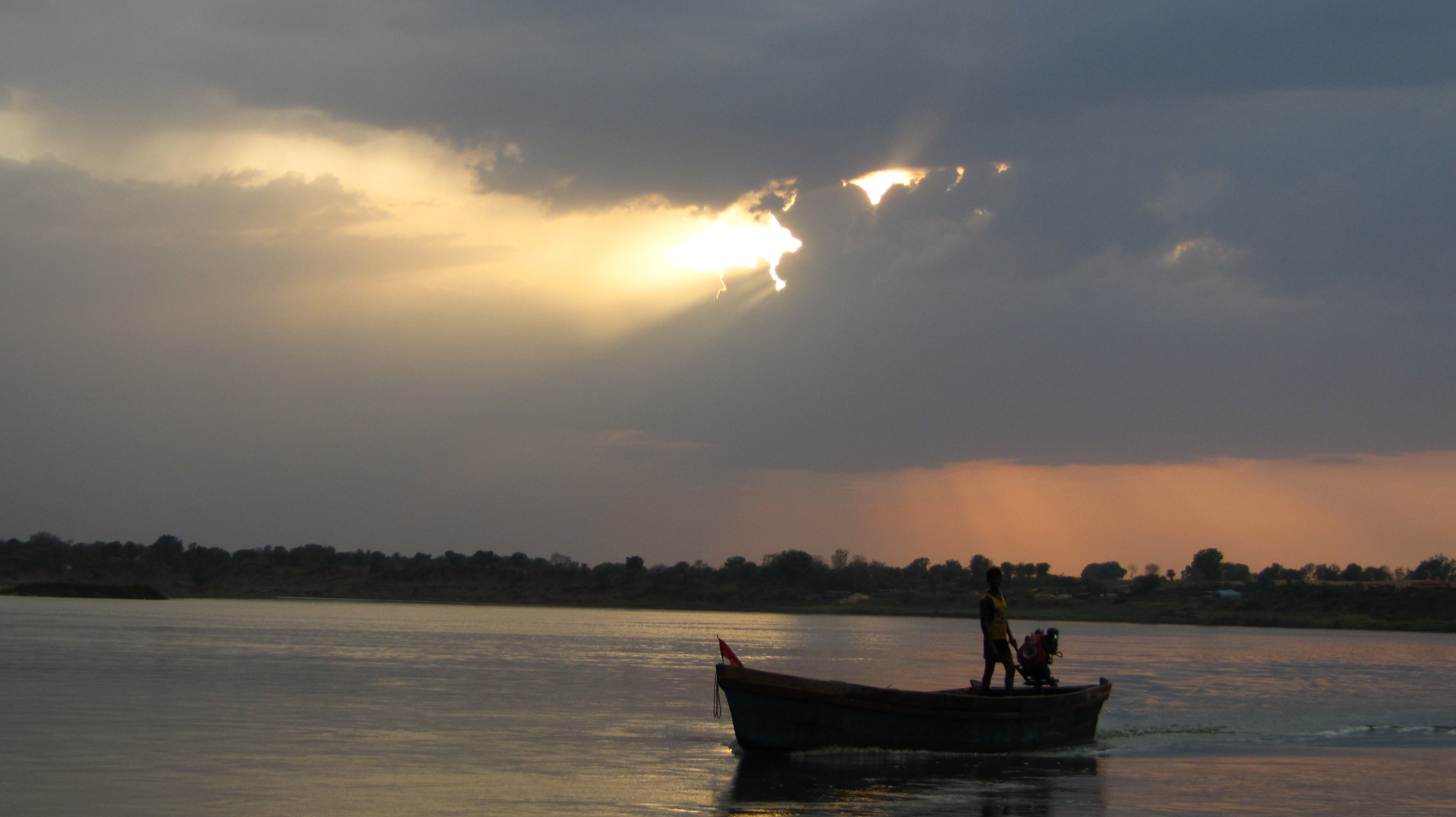
The Narmada River at Nasrullaganj

Namami Narmade program

== Components ==
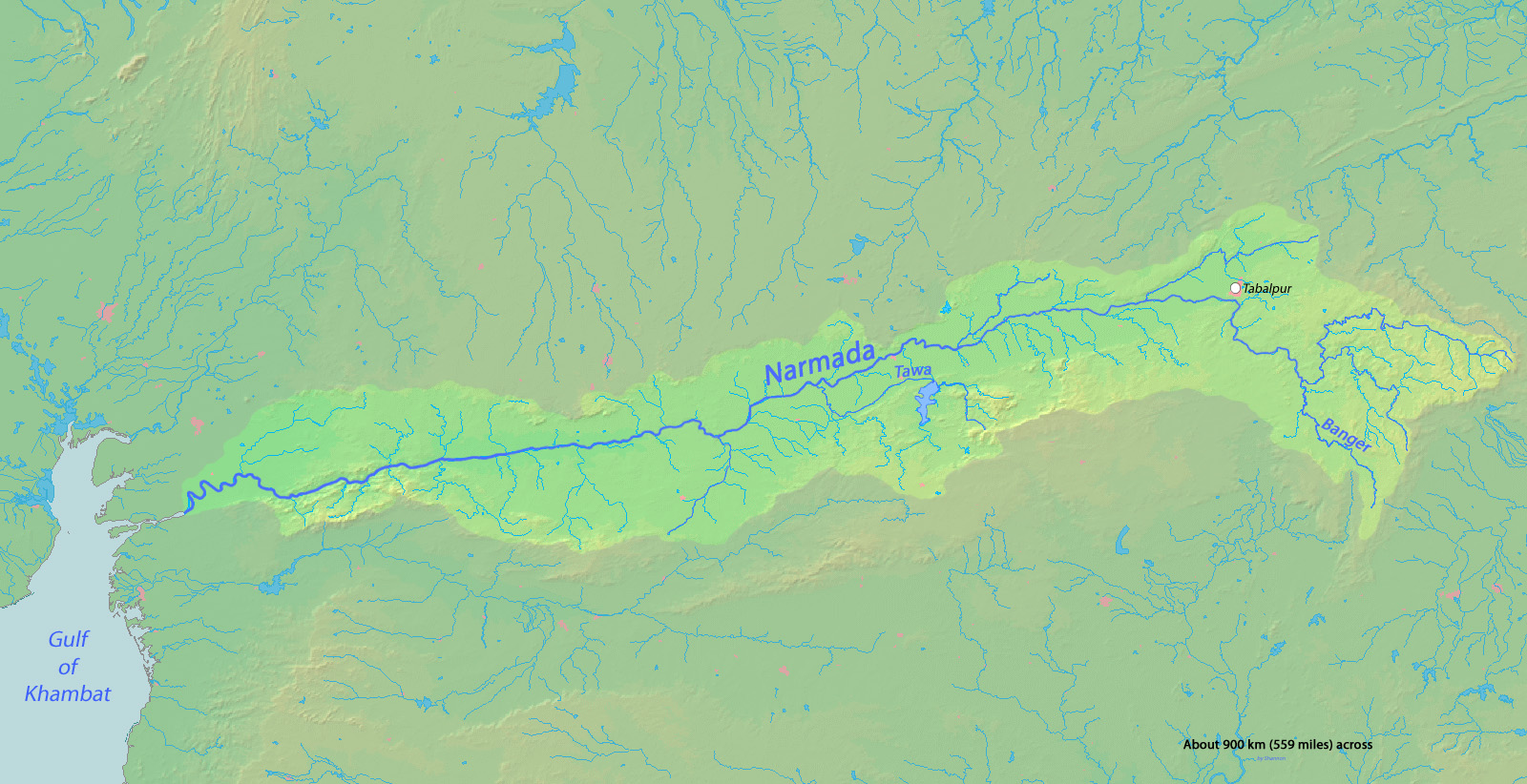
Map of the Narmada River and its tributaries' course

The primary component of the campaign is a yatra or pilgrimage. The yatra ran for 148 days from December 11, 2016, to May 15, 2017, and began and ended at Amarkantak, the origin of the Narmada river in Anuppur district, after traveling around Madhya Pradesh. Smaller "sub-yatras" covered areas not in the main route. The total length of the yatra was 2,930 kilometres (1,820 mi), with 1,077 kilometres (669 mi) being along the Narmada itself. The campaign covered 962 villages in 16 districts.

Members of the public were encouraged to participate in the yatra. Cultural and religious programs were organized at various points throughout the yatra. Prominent members of the public were present during these programs. Some of the attendees included spiritual leaders Sadhguru Jaggi Vasudev and the Dalai Lama, actors Vivek Oberoi, Anupam Kher, Govinda and Suzanne Bernert, and classical musicians Sonal Mansingh and Vishwa Mohan Bhatt.

The campaign also included a group of 50 public representatives and other volunteers who accompanied the yatra to raise awareness about ecologically friendly farming practices, pollution, water conservation, and forest conservation.

The campaign also includes planting 60 million trees along the river's banks and the promotion of fruit tree cultivation among farmers. Farmers would be financially supported for three years while the trees mature and bear fruit. Water treatment plants for sewage treatment at cities along the river and the establishment of "mukti dhams" or crematoriums to prevent the release of corpses into the river are also planned.

== Impact ==
By November 2016, 11,834 people had registered to participate in the yatra. As of March 2017, the campaign was estimated to have reached 30 million people in 584 villages. Additionally, 37,349 saplings were planted by 118,000 farming families over an area of 144,000 hectares (360,000 acres).

== Reception ==
The Dalai Lama has said that the government's conservation efforts were "laudable" and will "go a long way in conserving environment and water." Sadhguru said on Twitter that this "seva" or service should be the "sacred duty of every citizen of Madhya Pradesh" and called for a similar river conservation program that would be nationwide. The initiative to promote fruit sapling plantation and stop fertilizer use has found approval among environmental experts in India. A petition was filed in the Madhya Pradesh high court against the yatra, regarding the amount of money being spent on the campaign. The petition alleged that money was being used on publicity rather than cleaning the river.

== Organizing committee ==
A committee was constituted to oversee the campaign. Shivraj Singh Chouhan, Chief Minister of Madhya Pradesh, is the chairman of the committee, and Minister for Forest, Planning, Economics and Statistics, Dr.Gauri Shankar Shejwar is vice-chairman. Minister of State for Narmada Valley Development, Lal Singh Arya and Chairman of State Mineral Development Corporation, Shiv Choubey, are also on the committee. The committee also includes ministers overseeing the 16 districts that lie along the rivers banks, as well as Members of Parliament, Members of the Legislative Assembly of Madhya Pradesh, commissioners and Panchayat chairmen of the districts. Additionally, 18 Spiritual Leaders, social activists and experts in relevant subjects are part of the committee. Additional Chief Secretary Planning, Economic and Statistics serves as a member secretary and the Executive Director Madhya Pradesh Jan Abhiyan Parishad serves as a member assistant secretary.
