= Atar Singh Bhadana =

Indian politician (1957–2026)

Member of Rajasthan Legislative Assembly
- In office 2003–2008
- Preceded by: Established
- Succeeded by: Gyarsaram
- Constituency: Bayana Assembly constituency

Personal details
- Born: 1 March 1957
- Died: 11 October 2026 (aged 69) Bharatpur, Rajasthan, India
- Party: Bharatiya Janata Party

Atar Singh Bhadana (1 March 1957 – 11 October 2026) was an Indian politician from Rajasthan's Bayana constituency. Bhadana was born on 1 March 1957. He died on 11 October 2026, after he was beaten by villagers during a protest over the opening of a stone crusher site in Bharatpur. Bhadana was 69.
