= Mevaram Jatav =

Indian politician

Member of the Madhya Pradesh Legislative Assembly
- In office 2020–2023
- Preceded by: Ranvir Jatav
- Succeeded by: Keshav Desai
- Constituency: Gohad

Personal details
- Born: 4 September 1970 (age 55)
- Spouse: MALTI JATAV

Mevaram Jatav is an Indian politician of the Indian National Congress party from Madhya Pradesh. He is a former member of the Madhya Pradesh Legislative Assembly from Gohad.
