= Suzanne Bernert =

German actress working in India

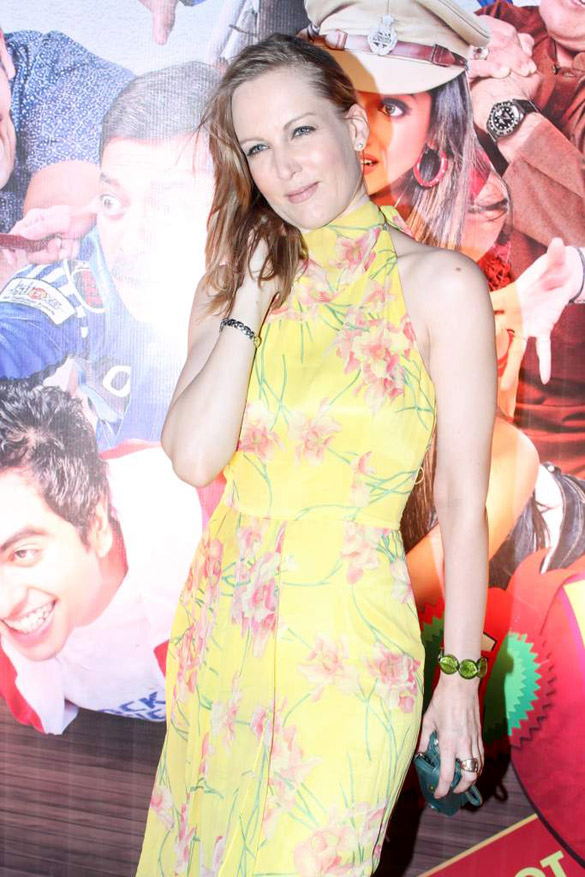
- Bernert at audio release of Love Recipe
- Born: 26 September; Detmold, Germany
- Occupation: Actress
- Years active: 2004–present
- Height: 5 ft 7 in (1.70 m)
- Spouse: Akhil Mishra (m. 2009; died 2023)

Suzanne Bernert (born 26 September) (Note: Contentious birth year has been removed since the subject confirmed that both the birth years are incorrect.) is a German actress based in India who works in Indian film and television industries in various languages. She is the first foreign actress to feature in major roles in Hindi television industry.

Bernert has acted in Ramdhanu - The Rainbow, Honeymoon Travels Pvt. Ltd. and the television serials like 7 RCR and Kasautii Zindagii Kay. She acted in Colors TV's historical serial Chakravartin Ashoka Samrat as Queen Helena and received nominations and praise for it. She also appeared in the Star Plus serial Yeh Rishta Kya Kehlata Hai. She portrayed Sonia Gandhi on the television series 7 RCR, and in the Hindi film The Accidental Prime Minister.

== Early life and career ==
Bernert is from Detmold, Germany. Her mother Monika and father Michael live in Lindau, Germany. When she was 19, she did a three-year acting course under Heidelotte Diehl in Berlin, and is a trained ballet dancer. Bernert was the main lead in the film Destined Hearts by Indian filmmaker Anant Duseja in 2003, which was shot entirely in Dubai but never released. She made her stage debut at the AuGus Theater in Neu Ulm, as the lead character in Yasmina Reza's 3XLife, directed by Ralf Milde. Later in Mumbai, she performed with her husband Akhil Mishra in a play called Hello Spring, an adaptation of a Neil Simon play.

Bernert moved to Mumbai in 2005. In addition to German, she can speak Hindi, Marathi and Bengali. Bernert has worked in an array of film and television series ranging from Marathi and Bengali language industries. Bernert has appeared opposite Aamir Khan in a Titan Watches ad. She promoted Jaipur tourism by acting in a short film titled Padharo India. Bernert was the first non-Indian to partake in a Lavani celebrity dance show up to the semi-finals – Dholkichya talavar Reality Show RDP/Logical Thinkers as herself.

Bernert portrayed the role of Sonia Gandhi in the film The Accidental Prime Minister, which was released on 11 January 2019. She was honoured with the Outstanding Contribution to Indian Cinema and Television award at the Rajasthan International Film Festival in 2018. Cama Awards Of Gujarat held in Ahmedabad on 1 October 2018 awarded : The International Diva of Bollywood Bernert is also seen in the short film Majnu ki Juliet.

In 2020, Bernert acted in her first web series, State of Siege: 26/11 for ZEE5. She also opened the Mumbai Oktoberfest as a celebrity guest of the German consulate in Mumbai, India. She published her first short story called "The Diwali Gift" at the end of 2021.

== Personal life ==
Bernert married actor Akhil Mishra in a civil court on 3 February 2009. They married again in a traditional ceremony on 30 September 2011. She had worked with him in the film Kram and serial Mera Dil Dewaana (Doordarshan).

She also holds an Overseas Citizenship of India card following her marriage.

Mishra died on 20 September 2023 at the age of 67 after suffering a fall in the kitchen. As of March 2024, she is in a relationship with Arjun Hardas.

=== Humanitarian work ===
Along with Govinda Bernert became part of Narmada Seva Yatra, a campaign by the government of Madhya Pradesh.

== Filmography ==
Key
†	Denotes films that have not yet been released

=== Films ===
Year	Title	Role	Language	Notes	Ref
2004	Stop!	Suzanne	Hindi		
2007	Honeymoon Travels Pvt. Ltd.	Ditta	Hindi		
2008	Pranali-The Tradition	Judy	Hindi		
2009	Gallit Gondhal, Dillit Mujra	Rebecca	Marathi		
2010	Shahrukh Bola "Khoobsurat Hai Tu"	Stefanie Meyer	Hindi		
2010	No Problem	Savitri	Hindi		
2011	Iti Mrinalini	Julia Campbell	Bengali		
2011	Paalkhi	Foreign daughter-in-law	Marathi		
2012	Dusarya Jagatli-from Another World	Suzanne William	Marathi		
2012	In the Name of Tai	Tai's best friend	Hindi		
2012	Kram	Radha	Hindi		
2012	Love Recipe	Roza	Hindi		
2013	Padharo India	Mrs. Mathur	Hindi		
2014	Ramdhanu - The Rainbow	Jennifer	Bengali		
2015	KrupaSindhu	Jenny	Marathi		
2015	Than Than Gopal	Ana	Marathi		
2019	The Accidental Prime Minister	Sonia Gandhi	Hindi	Lead	
2020	Destined Hearts	Kate Meirs	Hindi	delayed release	
2022	Theerppu	Anastasia Aubert	Malayalam		
2024	Yatra 2	Sonia Gandhi	Telugu		

=== Television ===
Year	TV Series	Role	Notes	Ref
2005	Astitva...Ek Prem Kahani	Catherine	Recurring	
2006	Aisa Des Hai Mera	Linda Hamilton	Recurring	
2006–2008	Kasautii Zindagii Kay	Doris Bajaj	Recurring	
2007–2008	Jamegi Jodi.com	Catherine		
2007	Mera Dil Diwaana	Jennifer		
2007	Jeete Hain Jiske Liye	Paulina		
2009	Jeevan Saathi	Lydia	Recurring	
2009	Jhansi Ki Rani	Mistress Moreland		
2011	Sanskaar Laxmi	Jennifer	Recurring	
2011	Dholkichya Talavar	Self	Marathi Reality Show	
2012	Kalay Tasmai Namaha	Jennifer	Marathi TV	
2012	Unch Majha Zoka	Miss Hertford	Marathi TV	
2012	Savdhaan India	Annie Scott		
2013	Ek Hazaaron Mein Meri Behna Hai	Liz		
2013	Shaitaan: A Criminal Mind	Sonia		
2013	CID	Roma		
2013	Ambat Goad	Genelia	Marathi TV	
2013	Pradhanmantri	Sonia Gandhi		
2014	7 RCR	Sonia Gandhi		
2014	Samvidhaan	Journalist		
2015–2016	Chakravartin Ashoka Samrat	Queen Helena	Main	
2016	Yeh Rishta Kya Kehlata Hai	Martha		
2017	Bin Kuch Kahe	Simone Miranda		
2018	Crime Patrol	Susanne Brown		
2018	21 Sarfarosh - Saragarhi 1897	Queen Victoria		
2018	Porus	Queen Ada of Caria	Recurring	
2019	Brisant	Self	German TV	
2023	Pyar Ka Pehla Naam: Radha Mohan	Mr. X	Guest Role	

=== Web series ===
Year	Web series	Role	Ref
2020	State of Siege: 26/11	Yocheved Orpaz	
2022	Aar Ya Paar	Jenny Bhatta	
2023	Asur	Michelle, owner of Spellnotion (cameo)	
