= Kailash Jatav =

Dr. Kailash Jatav

Chairman of the Madhya Pradesh State Commission for Scheduled Castes
- Incumbent
- Assumed office 23 April 2026

Member of the Madhya Pradesh Legislative Assembly
- In office 2013–2018
- Preceded by: Narmada Prasad Prajapati
- Succeeded by: Narmada Prasad Prajapati
- Constituency: Gotegaon

President of BJP SC Morcha, Madhya Pradesh
- In office 2020 – 5 Dec 2025
- Appointed by: Lal Singh Arya
- Succeeded by: Bhagwan Singh Parmar

Personal details
- Party: Bharatiya Janata Party
- Profession: Politician

Kailash Jatav is an Indian politician and a senior leader of the Bharatiya Janata Party (BJP) from Madhya Pradesh. He is serving as the State President of the BJP Scheduled Caste (SC) Morcha in Madhya Pradesh and was a Member of the Madhya Pradesh Legislative Assembly from Gotegaon (SC).

== Political career ==
Dr. Jatav contested the 2013 Madhya Pradesh Legislative Assembly election from the Gotegaon (SC) constituency on a Bharatiya Janata Party ticket and won, defeating the sitting legislator Narmada Prasad Prajapati.

He contested the same constituency in the 2018 Madhya Pradesh Legislative Assembly election as a BJP candidate but was defeated, and the seat was again won by Narmada Prasad Prajapati.

== Party positions ==
Dr. Kailash Jatav has held the position of State President of the BJP Scheduled Caste (SC) Morcha in Madhya Pradesh. In this role, he has worked to strengthen the party's organisational presence among Scheduled Caste communities across the state.

== Electoral history ==
- 2013 – Elected as MLA from Gotegaon, succeeding Narmada Prasad Prajapati.
- 2018 – Contested from Gotegaon as a BJP candidate; defeated by Narmada Prasad Prajapati.
