= Bayana Assembly constituency =

Legislative Assembly constituency in Rajasthan State, India

Coordinates: 26.92°N 77.29°E

Bayana
- Constituency No. 76 for the Rajasthan Legislative Assembly

Constituency details
- Country: India
- Region: North India
- State: Rajasthan
- District: Bharatpur
- Lok Sabha constituency: Bharatpur
- Established: 2003
- Total electors: 266,511
- Reservation: SC

Member of Legislative Assembly
- 16th Rajasthan Legislative Assembly
- Incumbent Ritu Banawat
- Party: Shiv Sena
- Elected year: 2023

Bayana Assembly constituency is one of the 200 Legislative Assembly constituencies of Rajasthan state in India. This area is considered to be Gurjar dominated. The number of Gurjar voters in Bayana Assembly constituency is around 80 thousand and number of villages is around 120. It is part of Bharatpur district and is reserved for candidates belonging to the Scheduled Castes.

== Members of the Legislative Assembly ==
Election	Member	Party
2003	Atar Singh Bhadana	Bharatiya Janata Party
2008	Gyarsaram	Bharatiya Janata Party
2013	Bachchu Singh	Bharatiya Janata Party
2018	Amar Singh Jatav	Indian National Congress
2023	Ritu Banawat	Shiv Sena

== Election results ==
=== 2023 ===
2023 Rajasthan Legislative Assembly election: Bayana
Party	Candidate	Votes	%	±%
Independent	Ritu Banawat	105,749	54.94	
INC	Amar Singh	65,107	33.82	−16.48
BJP	Bachchusingh Banshiwal	14,398	7.48	−38.95
NOTA	None of the above	1,003	0.52	−0.2
Majority		40,642	21.12	+17.25
Turnout		192,495	72.23	−0.07
Independent gain from INC		Swing		

=== 2018 ===
2018 Rajasthan Legislative Assembly election: Bayana
Party	Candidate	Votes	%	±%
INC	Amar Singh Jatav	86,962	50.3	
BJP	Ritu Banawat	80,267	46.43	
BSP	Sunil Kumar	3,054	1.77	
NOTA	None of the above	1,253	0.72	
Majority		6,695	3.87	
Turnout		172,885	72.3	
INC gain from BJP		Swing		

== See also ==
- List of constituencies of the Rajasthan Legislative Assembly
- Bharatpur district
