= Khuman Singh =

Indian politician

Member of the Madhya Pradesh Parliament for Sanchi Vidhan Sabha
- Incumbent
- Assumed office 1957

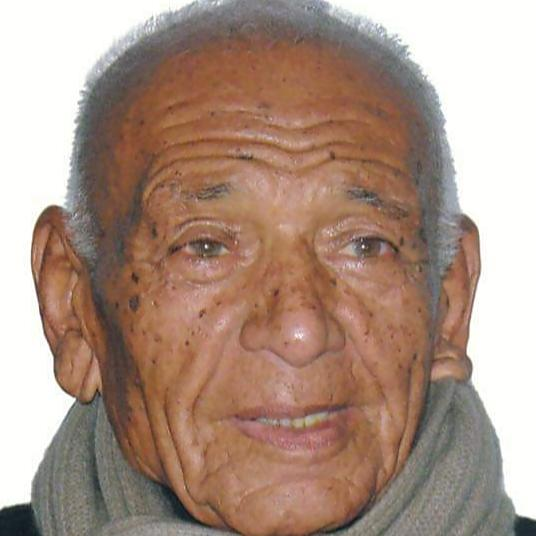

Th. Khuman Singh Raghuwanshi was an Indian politician from the state of the Madhya Pradesh. He represented Sanchi and Bareli Vidhan Sabha constituency in Madhya Pradesh Legislative Assembly by winning the 1957 Madhya Pradesh Legislative Assembly election. He was District Congress President of Raisen. He died of cancer in the year 2015.
