= Ritu Banawat =

Indian politician

Member of the Rajasthan Legislative Assembly
- Incumbent
- Assumed office 3 December 2023
- Preceded by: Amar Singh Jatav
- Constituency: Bayana Assembly constituency

Personal details
- Born: 25 January 1984 (age 42) Udaipur, Rajasthan, India
- Party: Shiv Sena (2024-present)
- Other political affiliations: Bhartiya Janta Party (till 2023)
- Spouse: Rishi Bansal
- Children: 2
- Occupation: MLA
- Profession: Politician
- Website: official website

Ritu Banawat (25 January 1984) is an Indian politician currently serving as a member of the 16th Rajasthan Legislative Assembly, representing the Bayana Assembly constituency. She is a Member of the Shiv Sena.
