= Lal Singh Arya =

Indian politician (born 1964)

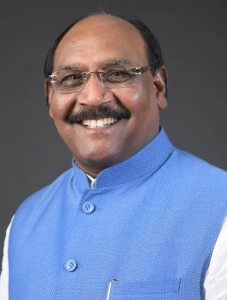
- Lal Singh Arya

National Vice President of the Bharatiya Janata Party
- Incumbent
- Assumed office 17 August 2026
- National President: Nitin Nabin

National President of Bharatiya Janata Party SC Morcha
- In office March 2020 – 2026
- Appointed By: Jagat Prakash Nadda
- Preceded by: Vinod Sonkar
- Succeeded by: Shivesh Kumar

Member of the Madhya Pradesh Legislative Assembly
- In office December 2013 – 2018
- Preceded by: Ranvir Jatav
- Succeeded by: Ranvir Jatav
- Constituency: Gohad
- In office 1998–2008
- Preceded by: Chaturilal Barahadiya
- Succeeded by: Makhan Lal Jatav
- Constituency: Gohad

Minister of Narmada Valley Development General Administration, Aviation, Happiness, Tribal Affairs, Scheduled Caste Welfare Department. Madhya Pradesh Government
- In office 2013–2018
- Chief Minister: Shivraj Singh Chouhan

Personal details
- Born: 15 June 1964 (age 62)
- Party: Bharatiya Janata Party
- Spouse: Sandhya Arya
- Children: Prashant Arya, Ishant Arya, 2 Daughters
- Education: BA LLB
- Alma mater: Jiwaji university
- Profession: Agriculturist, Politician

Lal Singh Arya (born 1964) is an Indian politician from the Bharatiya Janata Party (BJP). He served as a member of the Madhya Pradesh Legislative Assembly representing the Gohad (SC) seat from 1998 to 2008 and again from 2013 to 2018. He has also served as a Minister of State in the Government of Madhya Pradesh. Now, he is serving as the National Vice-President of the Bharatiya Janata Party.

== Early life and education ==
Lal Singh Arya was born on 15 June 1964. He holds a Bachelor of Arts and Bachelor of Laws (B.A., LL.B.) degree from Jiwaji University, Gwalior.

== Political career ==
Arya contested his first election in 1998 as a Bharatiya Janata Party candidate from the Gohad seat and defeated sitting MLA Chaturilal Barhadiya of the Bahujan Samaj Party by a margin of 4,338 votes. He was re-elected in the 2003 Madhya Pradesh Legislative Assembly election by defeating Indian National Congress candidate Ex. MLA Sriram Jatav with a margin of 10,649 votes. However, in the 2008 election he lost to Congress candidate Makhanlal Jatav.

In the 2013 assembly election, Arya once again won from Gohad, defeating Indian National Congress candidate Mevaram Jatav by 19,814 votes. He subsequently served as Minister of State in the Third Shivraj Singh Chouhan ministry, government of Madhya Pradesh.

In the 2023 Madhya Pradesh Legislative Assembly election, Lal Singh Arya contested from the Gohad constituency but was defeated by Keshav Desai of the Indian National Congress by a margin of 607 votes.

=== Current position ===
In August 2026, Arya was appointed a National Vice-President of the Bharatiya Janata Party as part of the party's organizational reshuffle under national president Nitin Nabin. He previously served as the National President of the BJP Scheduled Caste (SC) Morcha from September 2020 to August 2026.

== Positions held ==
Lal Singh Arya has held the following political and organizational positions.

#	From	To	Position	Party
	17-Aug-2026	Incumbent	National Vice-President of the Bharatiya Janata Party	BJP
1	March 2020	17-Aug-2026	National President of Bharatiya Janata Party SC Morcha	BJP
2	2013	2018	Minister of State, Government of Madhya Pradesh	BJP
3	2013	2018	MLA (3rd term) from Gohad assembly constituency	BJP
4	2003	2008	MLA (2nd term) from Gohad assembly constituency	BJP
5	1998	2003	MLA (1st term) from Gohad assembly constituency	BJP
