= Gohad Assembly constituency =

Assembly constituency in Madhya Pradesh

Coordinates: 26.45°N 78.43°E

Gohad
- Constituency No. 13 for the Madhya Pradesh Legislative Assembly

Constituency details
- Country: India
- Region: Central India
- State: Madhya Pradesh
- District: Bhind
- Lok Sabha constituency: Bhind
- Established: 1951
- Reservation: SC

Member of Legislative Assembly
- 16th Madhya Pradesh Legislative Assembly
- Incumbent Keshav Desai
- Party: Indian National Congress
- Elected year: 2023
- Preceded by: Mevaram Jatav

Gohad is one of the 230 Vidhan Sabha (Legislative Assembly) constituencies of Madhya Pradesh state in central India. This constituency is reserved for the candidates belonging to the Scheduled castes. It came into existence in 1951, as Gohad Mehgaon, one of the 79 Vidhan Sabha constituencies of the erstwhile Madhya Bharat state.

== Overview ==
Gohad (constituency number 13) is one of the 5 Vidhan Sabha constituencies located in Bhind district. This constituency covers the entire Mau Tehsil and Gohad tehsil of the district.

Gohad is part of Bhind Lok Sabha constituency along with seven other Vidhan Sabha segments, namely, Ater, Bhind, Lahar and Mehgaon in this district and Sewda, Bhander and Datia in Datia district.

== Members of the Legislative Assembly ==
Madhya Bharat: Gohad Mehgaon
Year	MLA	Party
1951	Ram Dhan	Indian National Congress

Indian National Congress is the most successful political party in Gohad Assembly constituency (Madhya Pradesh) elections.
1. INC (7 terms) (41.2%)
2. BJP / Bharatiya Jana Sangh (7 terms) (41.2%)
3. BSP (1 term) (5.88%)
4. PSP (1 term) (5.88%)
5. Janata Party (1 term) (5.88%)

Madhya Pradesh Legislative Assembly
Year	MLA	Party
1957	Sushila Devi Bhadoriya	Indian National Congress
1962	Ramcharanlal Thapak	Praja Socialist Party
1967	Kanhaiyalal Mahor	Bharatiya Jana Sangh
1972	Bhurelal Firojiya	Bharatiya Jana Sangh
1977	Bhurelal Firojiya	Janata Party
1980	Shriram Jatav	Bharatiya Janata Party
1985	Chaturbhuj Bhadkariya	Indian National Congress
1988^	Sopat Jatav	Indian National Congress
1990	Shriram Jatav	Bharatiya Janata Party
1993	Chaturilal Barahadiya	Bahujan Samaj Party
1998	Lal Singh Arya	Bharatiya Janata Party
2003	Lal Singh Arya	Bharatiya Janata Party
2008	Makhan Lal Jatav	Indian National Congress
2009^	Ranvir Jatav	Indian National Congress
2013	Lal Singh Arya	Bharatiya Janata Party
2018	Ranvir Jatav	Indian National Congress
2020^	Mevaram Jatav	Indian National Congress
2023	Keshav Desai Jatav	Indian National Congress

^ byelection

== Election results ==
=== 2023 ===
2023 Madhya Pradesh Legislative Assembly election: Gohad
Party	Candidate	Votes	%	±%
INC	Keshav Desai (Jatav)	69,941	47.32	▼4.25
BJP	Lal Singh Arya	69,334	46.91	▲4.98
BSP	Suresh Singh Solanki	2,919	1.98	▼0.95
AAP	Yashwant Patwari	1,366	0.92	New
ASP(KR)	Anita Kamal Nagar	1245	0.8	New
NOTA	None of the above	790	0.53	▼0.27
SP	Mohan Lal Mahor	444	0.3	New
Majority		607	0.41	▼9.23
Turnout		147,796	61.65	▲6.99
INC hold		Swing		

=== 2020 By-polls ===
2020 Madhya Pradesh Legislative Assembly by-elections: Gohad
Party	Candidate	Votes	%	±%
INC	Mevaram Jatav	63,643	51.57	+2.99
BJP	Ranvir Jatav	51,744	41.93	+11.86
BSP	Yashwant Patwari	3,614	2.93	−9.01
NOTA	None of the above	991	0.8	+0.04
Majority		11,899	9.64	−8.87
Turnout		123,408	54.66	−4.60
INC hold		Swing		

=== 2018 ===
2018 Madhya Pradesh Legislative Assembly election: Gohad
Party	Candidate	Votes	%	±%
INC	Ranvir Jatav	62,981	48.58	
BJP	Lal Singh Arya	38,992	30.07	
BSP	Dr. Jagdish Sagar	15,477	11.94	
Bahujan Sangharsh Dal	Gulab Singh Jatav	4,386	3.38	
CPI(M)	Prem Narayan Mahor	1,734	1.34	
AAP	Guddu Valmik	1,173	0.9	
NOTA	None of the above	982	0.76	
Majority		23,989	18.51	
Turnout		129,656	59.26	
INC gain from BJP		Swing		

=== 2013 ===
2013 Madhya Pradesh Legislative Assembly election: Gohad
Party	Candidate	Votes	%	±%
BJP	Lal Singh Arya	51,711	45.65	
INC	Mevaram Jatav	31897	28.16	
BSD	Phool Singh Baraiya	14633	12.92	
BSP	Krishnagopal Chaurasiya (Jatav)	5890	5.20	
CPI(M)	Premnarayan Mahor	4748	4.19	
Majority		19814		
Turnout		108879		
Swing to BJP from INC		Swing		

=== 2009 By-polls ===
2009 Madhya Pradesh Legislative Assembly by-election: Gohad
Party	Candidate	Votes	%	±%
INC	Ranvir Jatav	55,442	60.47	
BJP	Master Sobaran Jatav	32871	35.85	
SP	Keshav Desai	955	1.04	
Independent	Hariom Jatav	595	0.65	
Independent	B. S. Lodheki Pali	468	0.51	
Majority		22571		
Turnout		90331		
Swing to INC from BJP		Swing		

=== 2008 ===
2008 Madhya Pradesh Legislative Assembly election: Gohad
Party	Candidate	Votes	%	±%
INC	Makhan Lal Jatav	27,751	30.37	
BJP	Lal Singh Arya	26198	28.67	
BSP	Mevaram Jatav	18603	20.36	
CPI(M)	Prem Narayan Mahaur	7541	8.25	
LJP	Chaturilal Barahdiya	6429	7.04	
SP	Oumprakash Baba	866	0.95	
Majority		1553		
Turnout		87388		
Swing to INC from BJP		Swing		

=== 2003 ===
2003 Madhya Pradesh Legislative Assembly election: Gohad
Party	Candidate	Votes	%	±%
BJP	Lal Singh Arya	27,646	32.58	
INC	Shriram Jatav	16997	20.03	
Independent	Chaturilal Barahdiya	9719	11.45	
Independent	Yashwant (ex Patawari)	8817	10.39	
CPI(M)	Prem Narayan Mahor	7962	9.38	
BSP	Mevaram Jatav	5426	6.39	
Majority		10649		
Turnout		76567		
Swing to BJP from INC		Swing		

=== 1998 ===
1998 Madhya Pradesh Legislative Assembly election: Gohad
Party	Candidate	Votes	%	±%
BJP	Lal Singh Arya	18,869	31.28	
BSP	Chaturilal Barahdiya	14531	24.09	
INC	Dataram Bansal	12737	21.12	
CPI(M)	Premnarayan Mahor (Kori)	11548	19.14	
Majority		4338		
Turnout		57685		
Swing to BJP from BSP		Swing		

=== 1993 ===
1993 Madhya Pradesh Legislative Assembly election: Gohad
Party	Candidate	Votes	%	±%
BSP	Chaturilal Barahdiya	21,235	35.17	
INC	Barelal Mandeliya	18013	29.83	
BJP	Shriram Jatav	14611	24.20	
Independent	Hariram Jatav	3931	6.51	
Majority		3222		
Turnout		57790		
Swing to BSP from INC		Swing		

== See also ==
- Gohad
- Bhind Lok Sabha Constituency
- Fourth Mayawati ministry
