= Pradeep Agrawal =

Indian politician

Pradeep Agrawal (born 1969) is an Indian politician from Madhya Pradesh, India. He is an MLA of Bharatiya Janata Party from Sewda Assembly constituency of Datia district. He won the 2023 Madhya Pradesh Legislative Assembly election. He received a total of 43,834 votes and won with the margin of 2,558 votes. This marks his second term as the MLA of Sewada, having previously served in the same capacity in 2013.
