= Gauri Shankar Shejwar =

Indian politician (born 1950)

Cabinet Minister, Madhya Pradesh Government
- In office 2013 – December 2018
- Ministry and Departments: Forests, Planning; Economics & Statistics
- Succeeded by: Tarun Bhanot; Umang Singhar

Member of the Madhya Pradesh Legislative Assembly
- In office 2013 – December 2018
- Succeeded by: Prabhuram Choudhary
- Constituency: Sanchi

Personal details
- Born: 1 July 1950 (age 76) Raisen, Bhopal State, India
- Party: Bharatiya Janata Party
- Spouse: Kiran Shejwar
- Education: Medical Doctor, MBBS From Gandhi Medical College, Bhopal (1975)
- Occupation: Politician
- Profession: Agriculture
- Source

Gauri Shankar Shejwar (born 1 July 1950) is a senior political leader of the Bharatiya Janata Party in Madhya Pradesh and was a senior Cabinet Minister in the state government from 2013 to 2018. He was a Cabinet Minister in charge of multiple portfolios, such as Forests, Planning, and Economics & Statistics in the Madhya Pradesh State Government headed by Chief Minister Shivraj Singh Chouhan from 2013-2018. He was also the Minister in charge of the Narmada Seva Yatra - a unique river conservation and development programme led by Shivraj Singh Chouhan. In the past, he has been cabinet minister in different BJP governments that have governed Madhya Pradesh. He has held important portfolios such as Forests, Home Affairs, Power & Energy, Health, and Education during his different tenures as Cabinet Minister.

== Political career ==
Shejwar has played a very active and important role at the grass-root level to strengthen the BJP in Madhya Pradesh during the 1980s and 1990s. Since 1990 he has had the support of local public leader Moorat Singh Thakur (Gairatganj). He was elected to the State Assembly (Vidhan Sabha) as MLA for the first time at the age of 27 years in 1977 on a ticket from [Bharatiya Jana Sangh], the erstwhile name of BJP. He was also State Vice-President of Janata Yuva Morcha during his initial political career. He has been the lead campaign manager for former Prime Minister Atal Bihari Vajpayee when the latter won from the Vidisha Lok Sabha constituency in MP during the 1991 general elections. He was elected Bharatiya Janata Party (BJP) MLA 7 times from Raisen district in Madhya Pradesh (MP) out of 9 times that he contested assembly elections.

He also led the BJP Legislative Party as the Leader of Opposition (1999–2002) in the MP Legislative Assembly during Digvijaya Singh's second term in power and played an important role in laying the foundation for BJP's return to power in the subsequent state elections in 2003. He has been a senior Cabinet Minister in every BJP government that governed Madhya Pradesh since the 1990s and is well regarded in political circles for his wide experience in administrative and legislative matters. He is a trained medical doctor from Gandhi Medical College - Bhopal.

He did not contest the state elections of Madhya Pradesh in 2018 to focus on his son's electoral debut instead.

Born in 1950 in Udaipura in Raisen district, Shejwar is personally involved in agricultural and charitable healthcare activities. He is married to Kiran Shejwar and has a son and two daughters.

== See also ==
- Third Chouhan ministry
