= Supriya Jatav =

Indian karateka (born 1991)

Personal information
- Nationality: Indian
- Born: 20 October 1991 (age 34) Gujarat, India
- Education: B.Com, PGDCA
- Height: 1.65 m (5 ft 5 in)

Sport
- Country: India
- Sport: Karate
- Weight class: 55-61 kg
- Rank: Black belt 3rd Dan
Medal record
Women's Karate
Representing India
Commonwealth Karate Championships
Gold medal – first place	2018 Durban	Kumite-61 kg
Gold medal – first place	2015 New Delhi	Kumite-55 kg
Bronze medal – third place	2013 Montreal	Kumite-55 kg
Asian Karate Champion Cup
Bronze medal – third place	2014 Tianjin	Kumite-55 kg

Supriya Jatav (born on 20 October 1991) is an Indian Karateka. She was born in Dahod, Gujarat, India. Her mother Meena Jatav and father Amar Singh Jatav is a retired army officer. She is presently coached under the guidance of Jaidev Sharma. From 2002 to 2006, she was coached and had played under the banner of Sports Authority of India. She presently represents and works with the Department of Sports and Youth Welfare, Government of Madhya Pradesh.

She is Kumite Karate athlete from India to achieve a medal in the three consecutive Commonwealth Karate Championships in Kumite Event. She is the first Indian to win the US Open Karate Championship in the elite division in 2019. Supriya Jatav won the national championship since 2010 till 2020. She has won the highest state awards for sports from Gujarat and Madhya Pradesh.

== AWARDS and recognition ==
Awards	Year
Shakti Doot Award (State Excellence Award by Gujarat Govt.)	2011
Major Dhyanchand Awards (Social Society Udaan Gwalior)	2012
Vikram Award (State Excellence Award by M.P. Govt.)	2014
National Sports Times Award	2016

=== International and World Championships ===
Competition Name & Venue	Year	Venue	Event	Position
Us Open Karate Championship	2019	Las Vegas, Nevada, USA,	-61 Kg. Kumite (Elite) Team Kumite	Gold Silver
WKF Karate Series A Championship	2018	Shanghai, China	-61 Kg. Kumite	Participant
WKF Karate 1 Premier League	2016	Dubai, UAE	-55 Kg. Kumite	Participant
21st Senior World Karate Championship	2012	Paris, France	-55 Kg. Kumite	Participant

=== Commonwealth Karate Championship ===
Championship	Year	Venue	event	Won
9th Senior Commonwealth Karate Championship	2018	Durban, South Africa	-61 Kg. Kumite Team Kumite	Gold Bronze
8th Senior Commonwealth Karate Championship	2015	New Delhi, India.	-55 Kg. Kumite	Gold
7th Senior Commonwealth Karate Championship	2013	Montreal, Canada	-55 Kg. Kumite	Bronze

=== Asian Championship ===
Championship	Year	Venue	Event	Position
15th Senior Asian Karate Championship	2018	Oman, Jordan	-55 Kg. Kumite	Participant
14th Senior Asian Karate Championship	2017	Astana, Kazakhstan	-55 Kg. Kumite	Participant
2nd Asian Championship Cup	2014	Tianjin, China	-55 Kg. Kumite	Bronze
12th Senior Asian Karate Championship	2013	Dubai, UAE	-55 Kg. Kumite	Participant
11th Senior Asian Karate Championship	2012	Tashkent, Uzbekistan	-55 Kg. Kumite	Participant
10th Senior Asian Karate Championship	2011	Guangzhou, China	-55 Kg. Kumite	Participant

=== South Asian Championship ===
Championship	Year	Venue	Event	Result
4th Senior South Asian Karate championship	2017	Colombo, Sri Lanka	-55 Kg. Individual Kumite and Team Kumite	Gold Gold
3rd Senior south Asian Karate Championship	2016	New Delhi, India	-55 Kg. Individual Kumite	Silver
2nd Senior south Asian Karate Championship	2014	New Delhi, India	-55 Kg. Individual Kumite and Team Kumite	Gold Gold

== See also ==
- Jatav
