= Lahar, India =

Lahar
- Town
- Location in Madhya Pradesh, India Lahar (India)
- Coordinates: 26.11°N 78.56°E
- Country: India
- State: Madhya Pradesh
- District: Bhind
- Elevation: 275 m (902 ft)

Population (2011)
  - Total: 35,674

Languages, English
  - Official: Hindi
- Time zone: UTC+5:30 (IST)
- PIN: 477445
- Telephone code: 07529
- ISO 3166 code: IN-MP
- Vehicle registration: MP-30
- Website: laharindia.com

Lahar is a city and a Nagar Palika in Bhind district in the Indian state of Madhya Pradesh. It's also a Tehsil Headquarter and Sub-Division in Bhind District.

== Geography ==
Lahar is located at 26.11°N 78.56°E. It has an average elevation of 275 metres (902 feet). Lahar lies near the [Chambal River] and is surrounded by fertile plains suitable for agriculture. Sports facilities in Lahar include a cricket stadium named after Indira Gandhi.

== Climate ==
Lahar experiences a subtropical climate, with hot summers, a monsoon season, and cool winters. Average summer temperatures range from 35–45 °C, while winter temperatures vary from 8–25 °C. The monsoon period lasts from June to September, providing most of the annual rainfall.

== History ==
The history of Lahar can be traced back to the Mahabharat era. According to local legend, the Lakchhagrih, a palace built of lac, was constructed by the Kauravas for the Pandavas at the end of their exile. It is believed that the Kauravas intended to burn the Pandavas inside this palace. Fragments of charred lac can reportedly still be found in the outskirts of town.

During the medieval period, Lahar was under the influence of regional rulers of the Chambal region and played a role in local trade and administration. Many families trace their roots in Lahar over generations, contributing to its cultural and social development.

Lahar is also the ancestral home of the renowned poet Hari Babu Gandhi (d. 2006), whose literary works in Hindi and local dialects gained widespread recognition. His descendants continue to reside in Lahar, preserving his legacy and contributing to the town's cultural life.

== Economy ==
Agriculture is the main occupation of Lahar's residents. Crops include wheat, rice, mustard, and pulses. In recent years, small-scale industries, including handloom weaving and brick-making, have also developed. Local markets cater to nearby villages and towns.

== Culture ==
Lahar has a rich cultural heritage influenced by Chambal region traditions. Festivals like Diwali, Holi, and Navratri are celebrated with local fairs and processions. Traditional folk music and dance, including Rai dance and Bhajan, are common during festivals.

== Education ==
Lahar has several schools and colleges offering education in Hindi and English. Notable institutions include:

- Government Higher Secondary School, Lahar
- Saraswati Vidya Mandir
- Lahar College of Arts and Science
- SUN Institute of Pharmaceutical

== Tourism ==
Tourist attractions around Lahar include:

- Nearby historical temples and fort remnants
- Natural spots near the Chambal River
- Local fairs during Diwali and Holi

Visitors are also attracted to Lahar’s surrounding rural landscape and cultural festivals.

== Transport ==
Lahar is connected by road to major cities including Bhind (60 km), Gwalior (110 km), and Jhansi (110 km). It is accessible via the state highway network. The nearest railway stations are Bhind and Gwalior. Public and private buses operate regularly.

== Demographics ==
As of the 2011 Census of India, Lahar Nagar Panchayat has a total population of 35,674, of which 18,914 are males and 16,760 are females. Literacy rate of Lahar is 78.94%, higher than the state average of 69.32%. Male literacy is around 87.12%, while female literacy is 69.72%. Children aged 0–6 comprise 12.79% of the population. Female sex ratio is 886 against the state average of 931.

== Politics ==
Lahar is part of the Lahar Assembly constituency in Madhya Pradesh. Notable elected representatives:

- 1951: Har Sewak, Indian National Congress
- 1962: Prabhudayal, Indian National Congress
- 1977: Ram Shankar Singh, Janata Party
- 1980–2023: Dr. Govind Singh, Indian National Congress
- 2023: Ambrish Sharma, Bharatiya Janata Party
