= Vasant Sadashiv Pradhan =

Indian politician

Vasant Sadashiv Pradhan (1914–2002) was a Bharatiya Jan Sangh politician from Madhya Pradesh. He was the leader of opposition of Madhya Pradesh from 1967 to 1972. He also served as finance minister of the state.
