= Bachchu Singh =

Indian politician

Member of the Rajasthan Legislative Assembly
- In office 2013–2018
- Succeeded by: Amar Singh Jatav
- Constituency: Bayana

Personal details
- Born: Basai, Bharatpur, Rajasthan, India
- Political party: Bharatiya Janata Party
- Occupation: Politician

Bachchu Singh is an Indian politician from the Bharatiya Janata Party and a member of the Rajasthan Legislative Assembly representing the Bayana Vidhan Sabha constituency of Rajasthan.
