= Sanchi Assembly constituency =

Constituency of the Madhya Pradesh legislative assembly in India

Coordinates: 23.48°N 77.74°E

Sanchi
- Constituency No. 142 for the Madhya Pradesh Legislative Assembly

Constituency details
- Country: India
- Region: Central India
- State: Madhya Pradesh
- District: Raisen
- Lok Sabha constituency: Vidisha
- Established: 1957
- Reservation: SC

Member of Legislative Assembly
- 16th Madhya Pradesh Legislative Assembly
- Incumbent Prabhuram Choudhary
- Party: Bharatiya Janata Party
- Elected year: 2023
- Preceded by: Gauri Shankar Shejwar

Sanchi is one of the 230 Vidhan Sabha (Legislative Assembly) constituencies of Madhya Pradesh state in central India. It is a segment of Vidisha Lok Sabha constituency. Sanchi is known for its Buddhist monuments, called Sanchi Stupas.

The assembly seat lies in Raisen district.

== Members of Vidhan Sabha ==
Election	Name	Party
1957	Khuman Singh	Indian National Congress
1962	Gulab Chand	Socialist Party
1967	Kumadanlal	Bharatiya Jana Sangh
1972	Dulichand	Indian National Congress
1977	Gauri Shankar Shejwar	Janata Party
1980	Gauri Shankar Shejwar	Bharatiya Janata Party
1985	Prabhuram Choudhary	Indian National Congress
1990	Gauri Shankar Shejwar	Bharatiya Janata Party
1993	Gauri Shankar Shejwar	Bharatiya Janata Party
1998	Gauri Shankar Shejwar	Bharatiya Janata Party
2003	Gauri Shankar Shejwar	Bharatiya Janata Party
2008	Prabhuram Choudhary	Indian National Congress
2013	Gauri Shankar Shejwar	Bharatiya Janata Party
2018	Prabhuram Choudhary	Indian National Congress
2020^	Prabhuram Choudhary	Bharatiya Janata Party
2023	Prabhuram Choudhary	Bharatiya Janata Party

^ bypoll

== Election results ==
=== 2023 ===
2023 Madhya Pradesh Legislative Assembly election: Sanchi
Party	Candidate	Votes	%	±%
BJP	Prabhuram Choudhary	122,960	59.45	−6.53
INC	G. C. Gautam	78,687	38.05	+8.18
NOTA	None of the above	1,616	0.78	+0.23
Majority		44,273	21.4	−14.71
Turnout		206,825	78.27	+5.29
BJP hold		Swing		

=== 2020 bypoll ===
2020 Madhya Pradesh Legislative Assembly by-elections: Sanchi
Party	Candidate	Votes	%	±%
BJP	Prabhuram Choudhary	116,577	65.98	+21.40
INC	Madanlal Choudhary	52,768	29.87	−20.83
NOTA	None of the above	966	0.55	−0.88
Majority		63,809	36.11	+29.99
Turnout		176,677	72.99	−2.33
BJP gain from INC		Swing		

=== 2018 ===
2018 Madhya Pradesh Legislative Assembly election: Sanchi
Party	Candidate	Votes	%	±%
INC	Prabhuram Choudhary	89,567	50.7	
BJP	Mudit Shejwar	78,754	44.58	
NOTA	None of the above	2,519	1.43	
Majority		10,813	6.12	
Turnout		176,654	75.32	

=== 2013 ===
- Dr Gourishankar Shejwar (BJP) : 85,599 votes
- Dr Prabhuram Choudhary (INC) : 64,663

=== 1962 ===
- Gulab Chand (SOC) : 7,979 votes
- Vijai Singh (INC) : 7,400

== See also ==
- Sanchi
