= Gotegaon Assembly constituency =

Constituency of the Madhya Pradesh legislative assembly in India

Coordinates: 23.04°N 79.48°E

Gotegaon
- Constituency No. 118 for the Madhya Pradesh Legislative Assembly

Constituency details
- Country: India
- Region: Central India
- State: Madhya Pradesh
- District: Narsinghpur
- Lok Sabha constituency: Mandla
- Established: 1972
- Reservation: SC

Member of Legislative Assembly
- 16th Madhya Pradesh Legislative Assembly
- Incumbent Mahendra Nagesh
- Party: Indian National Congress
- Elected year: 2023
- Preceded by: Narmada Prasad Prajapati

Gotegaon is one of the 230 Vidhan Sabha (Legislative Assembly) constituencies of Madhya Pradesh state in central India.

It is part of Narsinghpur district.

== Members of the Legislative Assembly ==
Election	Name	Party
1952	Shyam Sunder Narayan	Indian National Congress
1957	Shyam Sunder Narayan	Indian National Congress
1962	Shashibhushan Singh	Praja Socialist Party
1967	T. S. Singh	Indian National Congress
1972	Narsingdas	Indian National Congress
1977	Saraschandra Jharia	Janata Party
1980	Ramkishan Hajji	Indian National Congress (Indira)
1985	Narmada Prasad	Indian National Congress
1990	Anchal Bhai	Bharatiya Janata Party
1993	Narmada Prasad	Indian National Congress
1998	Shekhar Chaudhary	Indian National Congress
2003	Hakamsingh Chadhar	Bharatiya Janata Party
2008	Narmada Prasad Prajapati	Indian National Congress
2013	Kailash Jatav	Bharatiya Janata Party
2018	Narmada Prasad Prajapati	Indian National Congress
2023	Mahendra Nagesh	Bharatiya Janata Party

== Election results ==
=== 2023 ===
2023 Madhya Pradesh Legislative Assembly election: Gotegaon
Party	Candidate	Votes	%	±%
BJP	Mahendra Nagesh	91,737	50.46	+8.61
INC	Narmada Prasad Prajapati	43,949	24.18	−25.56
Independent	Shekhar Choudhary	36,018	19.81	
GGP	Thakur Suresh Jhariya	3,310	1.82	+0.2
NOTA	None of the above	2,890	1.59	−0.37
Majority		47,788	26.28	+18.39
Turnout		181,793	83.94	+2.79
BJP gain from INC		Swing		

=== 2018 ===
2018 Madhya Pradesh Legislative Assembly election: Gotegaon
Party	Candidate	Votes	%	±%
INC	Narmada Prasad Prajapati	79,289	49.74	
BJP	Kailash Jatav	66,706	41.85	
GGP	Suresh Kumar Mehra	2,584	1.62	
AAP	Mahesh Prasad Choudhary	2,109	1.32	
BSP	Jagdish Choudhary (Bedu Wale)	2,071	1.3	
Independent	Pramod Jhariya (Tiger)	1,704	1.07	
NOTA	None of the above	3,121	1.96	
Majority		12,583	7.89	
Turnout		159,393	81.15	
INC gain from		Swing		

== See also ==
- Gotegaon
