= Gandhwani Assembly constituency =

Constituency of the Madhya Pradesh legislative assembly in India

Coordinates: 22.34°N 75.01°E

Gandhwani
- Constituency No. 197 for the Madhya Pradesh Legislative Assembly

Constituency details
- Country: India
- Region: Central India
- State: Madhya Pradesh
- District: Dhar
- Lok Sabha constituency: Dhar
- Established: 2008
- Reservation: ST

Member of Legislative Assembly
- 16th Madhya Pradesh Legislative Assembly
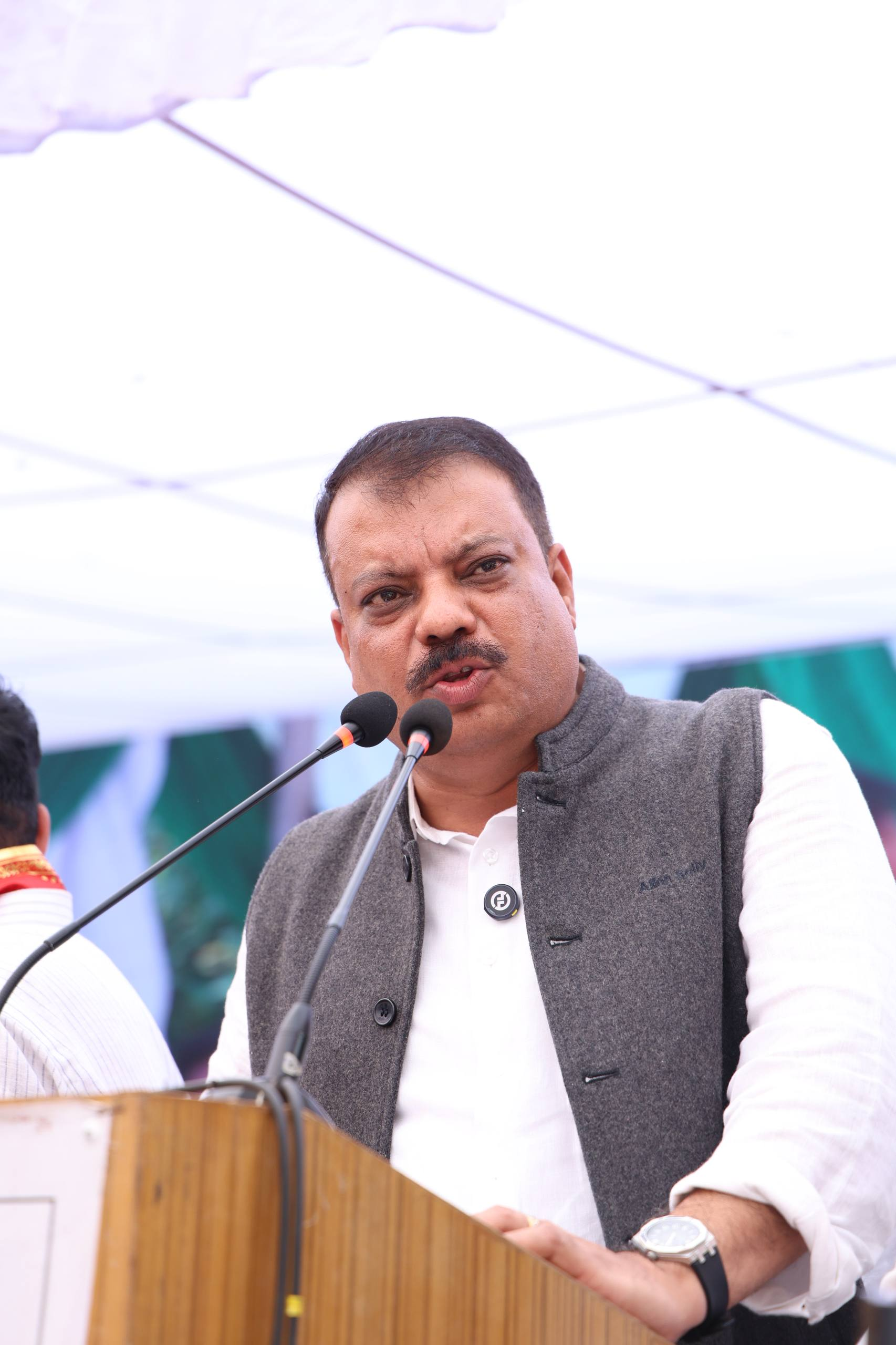
- Incumbent Umang Singhar
- Party: Indian National Congress
- Elected year: 2023

Gandhwani is one of the 230 Vidhan Sabha (Legislative Assembly) constituencies of Madhya Pradesh state in central India.

It is part of Dhar District. As of 2023, its representative is Umang Singhar of the Indian National Congress.

== Members of the Legislative Assembly ==
Election	Name	Party
2008	Umang Singhar	Indian National Congress
2013	Umang Singhar	Indian National Congress
2018	Umang Singhar	Indian National Congress
2023	Umang Singhar	Indian National Congress

== Election results ==
=== 2023 ===
2023 Madhya Pradesh Legislative Assembly election: Gandhwani
Party	Candidate	Votes	%	±%
INC	Umang Singhar	98,982	54.01	−3.52
BJP	Sardar Singh Mehda	76,863	41.94	+7.46
AAP	Sumanbai Bherusingh Anare	2,296	1.25	+0.27
BSP	Dhumsingh Mandloi (Machhar)	2,041	1.11	−0.11
NOTA	None of the above	3,069	1.67	−1.37
Majority		22,119	12.07	−10.98
Turnout		183,251	74.14	−1.43
INC hold		Swing		

=== 2018 ===
2018 Madhya Pradesh Legislative Assembly election: Gandhwani
Party	Candidate	Votes	%	±%
INC	Umang Singhar	96,899	57.53	
BJP	Sardarsingh Mehda	58,068	34.48	
GGP	Aadiwasi Arvind Muzalda	3,218	1.91	
BSP	Bhuwan Singh Gahlot	2,056	1.22	
AAP	Govind Rawat	1,646	0.98	
NOTA	None of the above	5,126	3.04	
Majority		38,831	23.05	
Turnout		168,431	75.57	
INC hold		Swing		

=== 2013 ===
2013 Madhya Pradesh Legislative Assembly election: Gandhwani
Party	Candidate	Votes	%	±%
INC	Umang Singhar	66,760	49.96	
BJP	Sardar Singh Mehda	54434	40.73	
Independent	Amar Singh Solanki	2496	1.87	N/A
BSP	Kavita Krishnapal Singh Chouhan	2103	1.57	
Independent	Sukhlal Sisodiya	1551	1.16	
NCP	Parwat Singh Mandloi	1473	1.10	
NOTA	None of the Above	4817	3.60	
Majority				
Turnout		133634	63.69	
INC hold		Swing		

== See also ==
- List of constituencies of the Madhya Pradesh Legislative Assembly
- Dhar district
- Gandhwani
