= Surya Deo Sharma =

Surya Deo Sharma was a Hindu leader and the caretaker of Pitambara Peeth Datiya after the death of Guru Maharaj of Datiya. He also founded Arya Veer Dal, an organisation for Hindu youth. He was accused of helping the assassin of Mahatma Gandhi, Nathuram Godse, by providing him with guns.

Surya Deo Sharma was from Kathaout village in Ghazipur district, Uttar Pradesh.

The family youth destroyed the airstrip which was built by the British military as the second line of defence for the world war.

Surya Deo Sharma entered Hindu politics in Gwalior State under the patronage of the Maharaja of Gwalior, Jiwaji Rao Scindhia. He was elected a municipal councillor and twice elected as a Member of Legislative Assembly in Madhya Pradesh, firstly from Sewdha and then from Datia.

He left politics on the orders of Shri Guru Maharaj. After leaving politics, Sharma was appointed caretaker of the religious peeth Shri Peetambara Peth in Datia by his spiritual guide, Guru Maharaj.

He is survived by his 2 daughters -Kamala Roy and Durga Pradhan .
