= Amar Singh Jatav =

Indian politician (born 2 March 1968)

Member of Rajasthan Legislative Assembly
- In office 2018–2023
- Preceded by: Bachchu Singh
- Succeeded by: Ritu Banawat
- Constituency: Bayana

Personal details
- Born: 2 March 1968 (age 58) Basai, Bharatpur
- Party: Indian National Congress
- Spouse: Laxmi Devi
- Parent: Sukhram (father)

Amar Singh Jatav (born 2 March 1968) is an Indian politician and former Member of Rajasthan Legislative Assembly from Bayana Assembly constituency. He is a politician of the Indian National Congress.
