= Ranvir Jatav =

Indian politician

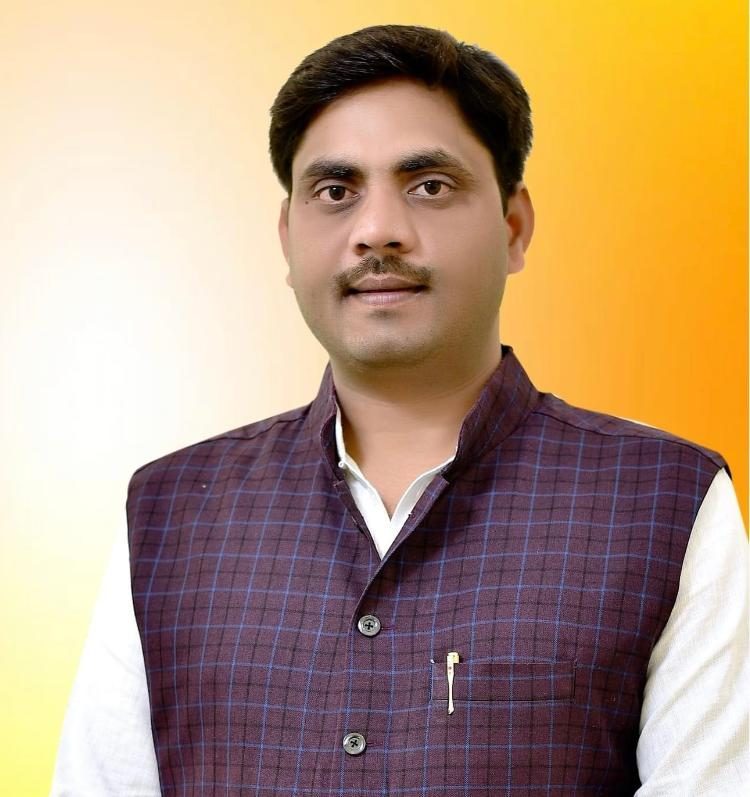

Member of Madhya Pradesh Legislative Assembly
- In office 2018–2020
- Preceded by: Lal Singh Arya
- Succeeded by: Mevaram Jatav
- In office 2009–2013
- Preceded by: Makhan Lal Jatav
- Succeeded by: Lal Singh Arya
- Constituency: Gohad

Personal details
- Born: Ranveer Jatav
- Party: Bharatiya Janata Party
- Other political affiliations: Indian National Congress (till 2020)
- Parent: Makhan Lal Jatav (Ex-MLA)

Ranveer Makhanlal Jatav is an Indian politician. He was elected to the Madhya Pradesh Legislative Assembly from Gohad. He was an elected member of the Madhya Pradesh Legislative Assembly as a member of the Indian National Congress. During 2020 Madhya Pradesh political crisis, he supported senior Congress leader Jyotiraditya Scindia and was one of the 22 MLAs who resigned and later joined Bharatiya Janata Party.

== Early life and education ==
Ranveer Jatav was born to Makhanlal Jatav (former MLA of Gohad). According to his 2009 election affidavit, Ranvir Jatav completed his higher secondary education in 2008. His 2018 election affidavit records him as having passed Class 12 from the Madhya Pradesh Board of Secondary Education.

== Political career ==
=== 2009 by-election ===
Following the death of his father, Makhan Lal Jatav, Ranvir Jatav contested the 2009 by-election from the Gohad constituency as a candidate of the Indian National Congress. He won the election and became a member of the Madhya Pradesh Legislative Assembly.

=== 2018 assembly election ===
Jatav returned to the Madhya Pradesh Legislative Assembly in the 2018 election, contesting Gohad on a Congress ticket. He received 62,981 votes, or 48.58% of the valid votes, and defeated Bharatiya Janata Party candidate Lal Singh Arya.

=== 2020 political crisis and joining the BJP ===
During 2020 Madhya Pradesh political crisis, Jatav was among the Congress MLAs who resigned from the Legislative Assembly. The resignations contributed to the fall of the Kamal Nath-led Congress government. He subsequently joined the Bharatiya Janata Party.
