= Keshav Desai =

Indian politician from Madhya Pradesh

Member of Madhya Pradesh Legislative Assembly
- Incumbent
- Assumed office Dec 2023
- Preceded by: Mevaram Jatav
- Constituency: Gohad

Personal details
- Born: 2 March 1966 (age 60)
- Party: Indian National Congress
- Spouse: Darshan shree
- Children: 5

Keshav Desai is an Indian politician of the Indian National Congress party from Madhya Pradesh. He is a current member of the Madhya Pradesh Legislative Assembly from Gohad (Vidhan Sabha constituency).
