= Umang Singhar =

Indian politician

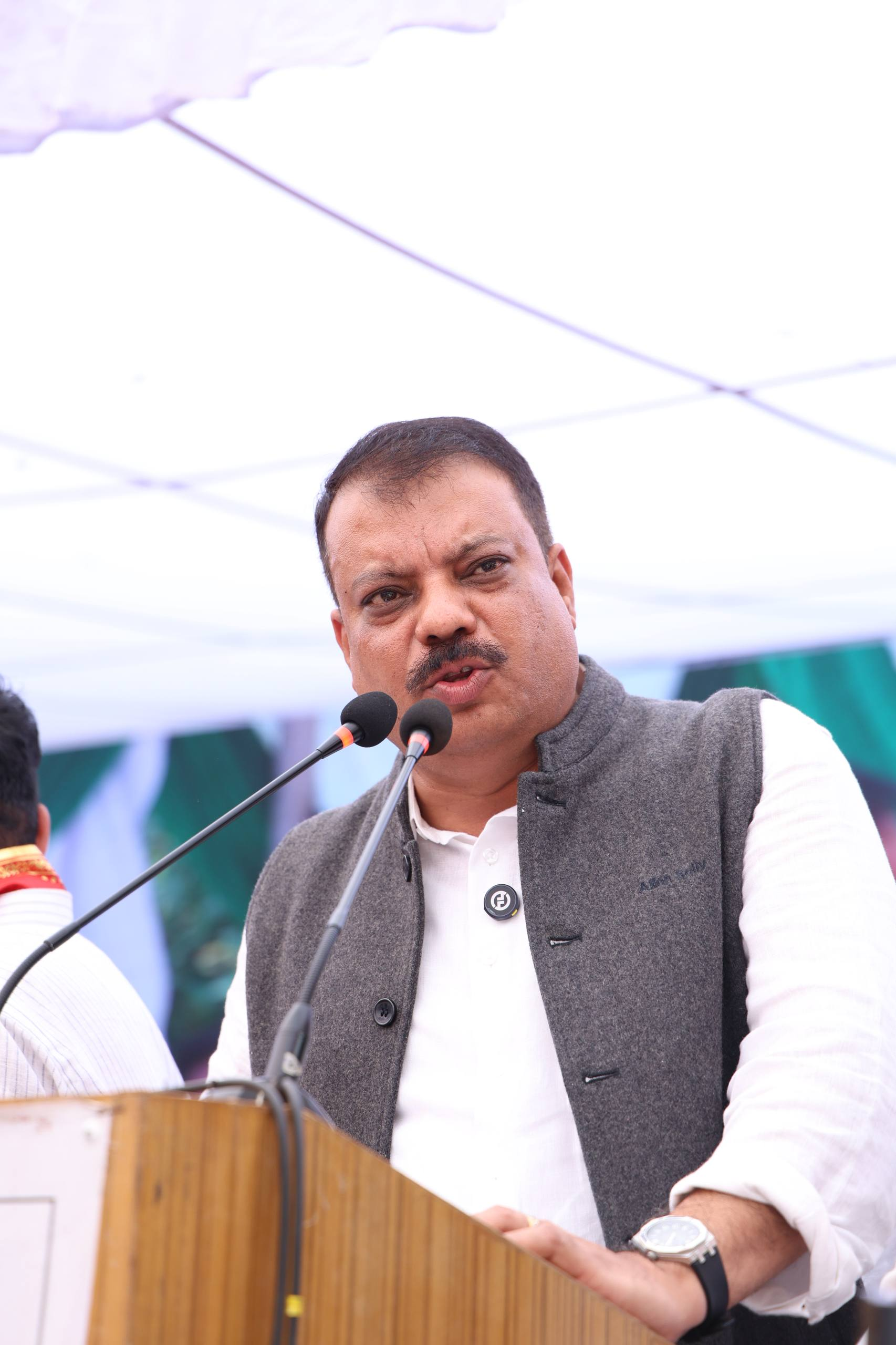

Leader of the Opposition, Madhya Pradesh Legislative Assembly
- Incumbent
- Assumed office 16 December 2023
- Preceded by: Govind Singh

Minister for Forest and Environment, Government of Madhya Pradesh
- In office December 2018 – March 2020

Member of the Madhya Pradesh Legislative Assembly
- Incumbent
- Assumed office 2008
- Constituency: Gandhwani

Personal details
- Born: January 23, 1974 (age 52) Dhar, Madhya Pradesh, India
- Party: Indian National Congress
- Parents: Late Shri Dayaram Singhar (civil judge) (father); Smt. Shakuntala Singhar (mother)
- Relatives: Late Smt. Jamuna Devi (aunt), former Deputy Chief Minister of Madhya Pradesh
- Education: B.A. (1994)
- Alma mater: Gujarat Arts College, Indore (Devi Ahilya University)
- Profession: Politician
- Website: umangsinghar.com

Umang Singhar (born 23 January 1974) is an Indian politician from Madhya Pradesh and a senior leader of the Indian National Congress. He is the 19th Leader of the Opposition in the Madhya Pradesh Legislative Assembly, a position he has held since December 2023, succeeding Govind Singh. He represents the Gandhwani constituency in Dhar district and has been continuously elected as a Member of the Legislative Assembly (MLA) since 2008, making him a four-time MLA from the same constituency. He is widely regarded as one of the most prominent Adivasi (tribal) leaders in Madhya Pradesh. He served as the Minister for Forest and Environment in the Kamal Nath government from December 2018 to March 2020. He also serves as the President of the Madhya Pradesh Adivasi Vikas Parishad. His political journey is closely connected to his aunt, the late Smt. Jamuna Devi, who served as Deputy Chief Minister of Madhya Pradesh and was also Leader of the Opposition in the state assembly.

== Early life and education ==
Umang Singhar was born on 23 January 1974 in Dhar, Madhya Pradesh, India. His father, Late Shri Dayaram Singhar, was a civil judge, and his mother is Smt. Shakuntala Singhar. He grew up in a small village in the Dhar district of western Madhya Pradesh, a region with a large tribal population. This upbringing gave him early exposure to the lives and challenges of rural and tribal communities, which later shaped his political career.

He completed his B.A. (Bachelor of Arts) in 1994 from Gujarat Arts College, Indore, affiliated with Devi Ahilya University, as recorded in his election affidavits filed with the Election Commission of India.

His political outlook was shaped strongly by his family background. His aunt, Late Smt. Jamuna Devi, was one of the most prominent Congress leaders in Madhya Pradesh. She served as Deputy Chief Minister of Madhya Pradesh during Digvijaya Singh's tenure as Chief Minister and also served as Leader of the Opposition in the state assembly. She was known for her outspoken nature, including her public criticism of senior party leaders. Her influence on Umang Singhar and his connection with tribal constituencies in the region is widely acknowledged, and he has continued her legacy through welfare initiatives carried out in her name.

== Political career ==
=== Entry into politics ===
Umang Singhar joined the Indian National Congress and began his political career in the Dhar district of Madhya Pradesh. In 1998, he contested the Dharampuri assembly seat but was defeated by a small margin. Recognising his energy and growing popularity among young party workers, the Congress appointed him president of the District Youth Congress in 2001. He also contested the Dhar Lok Sabha seat in 2004.

In the 2008 Madhya Pradesh Legislative Assembly election, he was given the ticket from the Gandhwani constituency in Dhar district. He won his first election with a large margin, defeating the Bharatiya Janata Party's Chhatarsingh Darbar. The same year, he was also appointed a member of the All India Congress Committee (AICC).

=== Re-election in 2013 and 2018 ===
Umang Singhar was re-elected from Gandhwani in the 2013 Madhya Pradesh Legislative Assembly election, defeating the BJP's Sardar Singh Meda. He won a third consecutive term in the 2018 election, again defeating the BJP candidate from the same constituency, further strengthening his position as one of the most popular MLAs in the region.

=== 2023 election ===
In the 2023 Madhya Pradesh Legislative Assembly election, Singhar contested from Gandhwani for the fourth consecutive time and won with 98,982 votes, defeating the Bharatiya Janata Party's Sardar Singh Meda by a margin of 22,119 votes and a vote share of 54.93%.

=== Election results (2008–2023) ===
The table below summarises Umang Singhar's election results from 2008 to 2023. All four elections were contested from the Gandhwani constituency in Dhar district as the Indian National Congress candidate.

Year	Constituency	Result	Votes received	Opponent (BJP) & margin
2008	Gandhwani	Won	48,183 votes (54.84%)	Chhatarsingh Darbar (27,124) — won by 21,059 votes
2013	Gandhwani	Won	66,760 votes (51.83%)	Sardar Singh Meda (54,434) — won by about 12,326 votes
2018	Gandhwani	Won	96,899 votes (59.34%)	Sardar Singh Meda (58,068) — won by 38,831 votes
2023	Gandhwani	Won	98,982 votes (54.93%)	Sardar Singh Meda (76,863) — won by 22,119 votes

=== Minister for Forest and Environment (2018–2020) ===
Following the Indian National Congress's victory in the 2018 Madhya Pradesh Legislative Assembly election, Singhar was appointed Minister for Forest and Environment in the Kamal Nath government in December 2018.

During his time as Forest Minister, he worked on the implementation of the Forest Rights Act for tribal communities across Madhya Pradesh, including efforts to grant tribal families formal recognition of their rights over forest land they had lived on and farmed for generations (locally known as Van Bhoomi Patte). He was also known as one of the more technologically active ministers of his time, having used satellite imagery to check government claims about tree-plantation drives, and questioned the previous state government's figures for a large-scale tree-plantation programme along the Narmada river.

=== Leader of the Opposition (2023–present) ===
He was appointed Leader of the Opposition in the Madhya Pradesh Legislative Assembly in December 2023, succeeding Govind Singh.

As Leader of the Opposition, he has raised several issues in the Madhya Pradesh Legislative Assembly, including large-scale tree felling in the Singrauli district linked to coal-mining projects, alleged violations of tribal land and forest rights, and the state of government hospitals. In December 2025, he and other Congress leaders staged a walkout from the Assembly over the Singrauli issue and later joined a fact-finding visit to the affected villages.

=== Symbolic protests in the Legislative Assembly ===
As Leader of the Opposition, he has become known for leading a series of theatrical, symbolic protests inside and outside the Madhya Pradesh Legislative Assembly premises to highlight issues against the state government. During the 2025 monsoon session, he led Congress MLAs in a demonstration in which two legislators were dressed as buffaloes while others played a traditional flute (been) in front of them, a symbolic reference to the Hindi idiom for a hopeless effort, used to accuse the BJP government of being unresponsive to public concerns. During the same session, Congress MLAs under his leadership also arrived at the Assembly carrying symbolic packets and syringes representing MD drugs, questioning the state government's inaction against the drug trade and alleged links between drug traffickers and ruling-party leaders. In an earlier protest during the 2025 budget session, he led MLAs in a demonstration in which a Congress legislator dressed as Kumbhakaran, the mythological giant known for his long slumber, lay down in front of the Mahatma Gandhi statue on the Assembly premises, while other MLAs played horns and a flute to "wake up" the "sleeping" state government over alleged scams.

=== National-level roles within the Congress party ===
Within the Indian National Congress, he has been given national-level responsibilities on more than one occasion. In October 2024, he was appointed by the All India Congress Committee as Senior Observer for the Vidarbha zone (Amravati and Nagpur districts) of Maharashtra for the 2024 Maharashtra Legislative Assembly election, working alongside former Chief Ministers Bhupesh Baghel and Charanjit Singh Channi.

He has also served as a member of the Congress party's Pradesh Election Committee for Himachal Pradesh, alongside chairperson Deepa Dasmunsi, as confirmed by the party's own records.

== Tribal welfare and Adivasi work ==
He is widely recognised as one of the most prominent Adivasi (tribal) political leaders in Madhya Pradesh. His political identity and public positions have consistently centred on the rights, welfare, and empowerment of tribal communities. He has repeatedly spoken about Jal, Jungle, Zameen (water, forest, and land) — a long-standing demand of tribal movements across India.

=== Madhya Pradesh Adivasi Vikas Parishad ===
He serves as the President of Madhya Pradesh Adivasi Vikas Parishad, an organisation focused on the development and welfare of tribal communities in the state. Through this body, he works on tribal education, employment, land rights, and the implementation of government welfare schemes for Adivasi communities.

=== Demand for a separate Aadivasi Dharam Code ===
Shri Umang Singhar has been a prominent voice in Madhya Pradesh for the demand of a separate religion code for tribal (Adivasi) communities in the national census, a long-standing demand associated with the wider Sarna and Adivasi Dharam Code movement across several Indian states. Speaking at a gathering of tribal people in Anuppur district, he urged Adivasi communities across Madhya Pradesh, Chhattisgarh, and other states to send a large number of representations to the President of India demanding a distinct religion code, warning that without such recognition their identity would continue to be recorded under other religious categories in the census. The demand has been widely discussed in tribal-rights circles as a means of protecting the distinct cultural and religious identity of Adivasi communities.

=== Forest rights and land rights ===
Throughout his political career, he has raised the issue of tribal land rights and opposed the acquisition of tribal land for corporate or government projects without the consent of tribal communities. As Forest Minister, he worked on the distribution of Van Bhoomi Patte under the Forest Rights Act.

He has also raised concerns in the Madhya Pradesh Legislative Assembly about large-scale tree felling in the Singrauli region, linked to coal-mining projects awarded to the Adani Group, describing it as a serious violation of tribal rights and environmental law. In December 2025, he took part in a Congress fact-finding visit to the affected area in Singrauli district, where he reportedly reached the site of tree-felling despite police attempts to stop the group from entering.

=== Jamuna Devi Free Coaching Classes ===
In memory of his aunt, Smt. Jamuna Devi, Singhar runs the Swargiya Jamuna Devi Nishulk Coaching Classes, a free coaching programme for students from tribal and economically weaker backgrounds, helping them prepare for competitive examinations such as NEET (the medical entrance examination). According to his official website, students from the programme have successfully cleared such examinations.

== Constituency work ==
As a four-time MLA from Gandhwani constituency in Dhar district, he has been involved in several development initiatives for his constituents.

He played a role in the appointment of a female doctor at the Gandhwani government hospital, addressing a long-standing concern of women patients in the area who preferred to consult a woman doctor.

He has also worked on rural infrastructure in his constituency, including the construction of a culvert (pulia) in Garadi gram panchayat in the Tanda area of Gandhwani constituency, to improve road connectivity for nearby villages.
