= Narottam Mishra =

Sanjeev datia

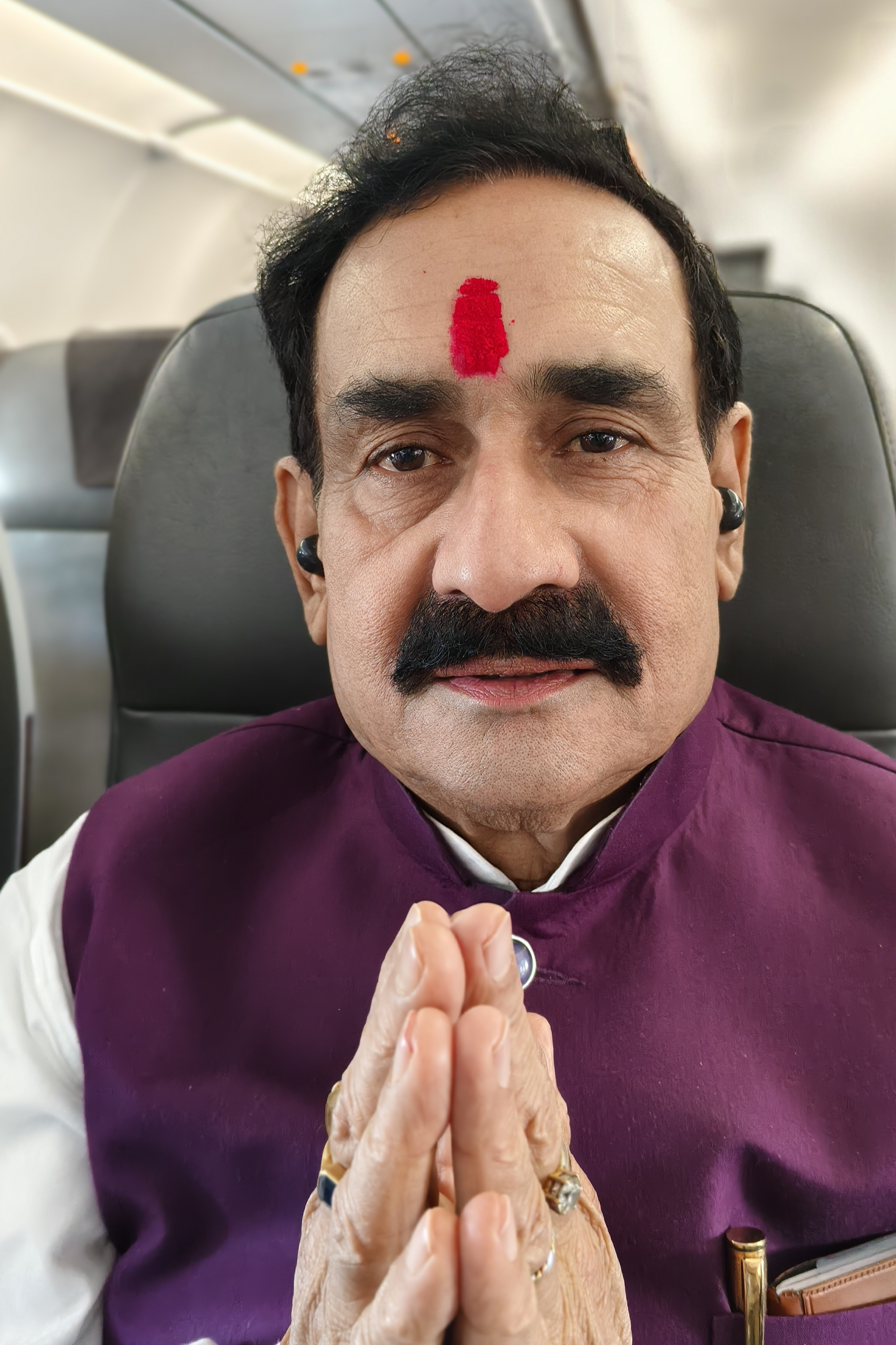
- Mishra in 2026

Cabinet Minister Government of Madhya Pradesh
- In office 21 April 2020 – 3 December 2023
- Ministry: Term
- Minister of Law Minister of Parliamentary Affairs: 13 July 2020 – 3 December 2023
- Minister of Home Affairs: 21 April 2020 -2023
- Minister of Health & Family Welfare: 21 April 2020 – 13 July 2020
- In office 21 December 2013 – 17 December 2018
- Ministry: Term
- Minister of Water Resources: 4 July 2016 – 17 December 2018
- Minister of Information & Public Relations: 4 July 2016 – 17 December 2018
- Minister of Health & Family Welfare Minister of Medical Education Minister of AYUSH: 21 December 2013 – 4 July 2016
- Minister of Parliamentary Affairs: 21 December 2013 – 17 December 2018
- In office 28 October 2009 – 14 December 2013
- Ministry: Term
- Minister of Health & Family Welfare: 27 January 2011 – 14 December 2013
- Minister of Housing: 26 May 2010 – 14 December 2013
- Minister of Law Minister of Parliamentary Affairs: 28 October 2009 – 14 December 2013
- In office 1 June 2005 – 12 December 2008
- Ministry: Term
- Minister of Urban Development: 27 August 2007 – 12 December 2008
- Minister of Education: 29 November 2005 – 27 August 2007
- Minister of Law: 1 June 2005 – 27 August 2007
- Minister of Parliamentary Affairs: 1 June 2005 – 12 December 2008

Member of the Madhya Pradesh Legislative Assembly
- In office 8 December 2008 – 2023
- Preceded by: Ghanshyam Singh
- Succeeded by: Rajendra Bharti
- Constituency: Datia
- In office 1998–2008
- Preceded by: Jawahar Singh Rawat
- Succeeded by: Imarti Devi
- Constituency: Dabra
- In office 1990–1993
- Preceded by: Narsingrao Pawar
- Succeeded by: Jawahar Singh Rawat
- Constituency: Dabra

Personal details
- Born: 15 April 1960 (age 66) Gwalior, Madhya Pradesh, India
- Citizenship: Indian
- Party: Bharatiya Janata Party
- Parent: Shivdutt Mishra (father)
- Education: Jiwaji University (B.A, M.A, Phd)

Dr. Narottam Mishra (born 15 April 1960) is an Indian politician who served as the former Minister for Home Affairs, Law and Legislative Affairs, Prisons, and Parliamentary Affairs in Government of Madhya Pradesh.

He is a leader of the Bharatiya Janata Party (BJP) and represented Datia constituency in Madhya Pradesh Legislative Assembly, from where he has been elected thrice consecutively, having also previously represented Dabra thrice. He lost 2023 assembly election against congress candidate Bharti Rajendra on 3 December 2023.

== Early life ==
He holds an M.A., and Ph.D. from Jiwaji University, Gwalior in 1998. He was Secretary of Jiwaji University Gwalior's students union in year 1977-78 and member of State Executive Body of MP Bharatiya Janata Yuva Morcha in 1978–80.

== Political career ==
Dr. Narottam Mishra is a six-time member of the Madhya Pradesh Legislative Assembly. He was first elected to 9th Vidhan Sabha in 1990 and was re-elected in 1998 and 2003 from Dabra assembly constituency of Gwalior district, and in 2008, 2013 and 2018 from Datia assembly constituency. Lastly, he was serving as the Minister for Home Affairs, Law, Prisons, and Parliamentary Affairs in Shivraj Singh Chouhan's cabinet from 2020 to 2023

Dr. Narottam Mishra has been a Minister from 2005-2008, 2009-2018 and 2020-2023.

He was inducted into Shri Babulal Gaur's Council of Ministers on 1 June 2005 as a Minister of State.

Dr. Mishra was inducted in Shri Shivraj Singh Chouhan's Council of Ministers on 4 December 2005 as Minister of State, and was later made a Cabinet Minister.

While being a Member of the Legislative Assembly, he contested the Lok Sabha election in 2009 but lost to Jyotiraditya Scindia. Soon after, he was re-inducted into Shri Shivraj Singh Chouhan's Council of Ministers on 28 October 2009 as Cabinet Minister. He again took oath as Cabinet Minister on 21 December 2013. He has served as Cabinet Minister for Health and Family Welfare, Urban Development, Public Relations, Water Resources, Law and Legislative Affairs, and Parliamentary Affairs, across his various terms.

He was disqualified by the EC on 23 June 2017 for filing wrong accounts of election expenditure in the 2008 Assembly polls and for using paid news in his election campaign and for not furnishing proper accounts of poll expenses. Mishra moved to Supreme court for relief. Vide its judgement dated 18 May 2018, the Delhi High Court set aside the order of the Election Commission, while also noting that "in the facts and circumstances of the case; there was no manner of proof that could be reasonably accepted by a tribunal established by law."

He took oath on 20 April 2020 as the Minister for Home Affairs, and Health and Family Welfare, Government of Madhya Pradesh. Subsequent to a cabinet reshuffle, he was appointed the Minister for Law and Legislative Affairs, Prisons, and Parliamentary Affairs, while continuing to retain the Ministry for Home Affairs.

Commenting on a riot on 10 April 2022 and the state's response with bulldozers the following day, he advised: "The house from where stones came, will be made into a pile of stones."
