= Ambrish Sharma =

Indian politician (born 1975)

- अंबरीश शर्मा
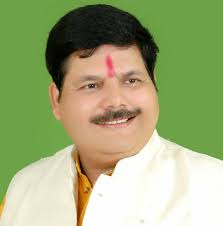

Member of the Madhya Pradesh Legislative Assembly
- Incumbent
- Assumed office 2023
- Preceded by: Govind Singh
- Constituency: Lahar

Personal details
- Born: Ambrish Sharma; 1975 (age 50–51)
- Citizenship: India
- Party: Bharatiya Janata Party
- Occupation: Politician

Ambrish Sharma (also known as Ambrish Sharma Guddu; born 1975) is an Indian politician from Madhya Pradesh, India. He is a Member of the Madhya Pradesh Legislative Assembly representing the Lahar Assembly constituency in Bhind district as a member of the Bharatiya Janata Party.

He was elected to the Madhya Pradesh Legislative Assembly in the 2023 Madhya Pradesh Legislative Assembly election, receiving 75,347 votes and defeating senior Indian National Congress leader Govind Singh.

== Political career ==
Sharma previously contested the 2018 Madhya Pradesh Legislative Assembly election from Lahar constituency as a candidate of the Bahujan Samaj Party but was unsuccessful. He later joined the Bharatiya Janata Party and won the seat in the 2023 election.

=== 2023 election and Dr. Govind Singh ===
In the 2023 Madhya Pradesh Legislative Assembly election, Sharma contested against veteran Congress leader Dr. Govind Singh, who had represented the Lahar constituency multiple times since 1990 and had also served as Leader of the Opposition in the Madhya Pradesh Legislative Assembly.

The 2023 contest was considered significant due to Singh's long political tenure in the constituency. Sharma secured 75,347 votes and won by a margin of 12,397 votes, marking a change in representation for the Lahar Assembly constituency.

== Electoral performance ==
Year	Constituency	Party	Result
2018	Lahar	Bahujan Samaj Party	Lost
2023	Lahar	Bharatiya Janata Party	Elected
