= Kukshi Assembly constituency =

Constituency of the Madhya Pradesh legislative assembly in India

Coordinates: 22.21°N 74.76°E

Kukshi
- Constituency No. 198 for the Madhya Pradesh Legislative Assembly

Constituency details
- Country: India
- Region: Central India
- State: Madhya Pradesh
- District: Dhar
- Lok Sabha constituency: Dhar
- Established: 1951
- Reservation: ST

Member of Legislative Assembly
- 16th Madhya Pradesh Legislative Assembly
- Incumbent Surendra Singh Baghel
- Party: Indian National Congress
- Elected year: 2023
- Preceded by: Mukam Singh Kirade

Kukshi is one of the 230 Vidhan Sabha (Legislative Assembly) constituencies of Madhya Pradesh state in central India. It was founded in 1951 as one of the 79 Vidhan Sabha constituencies of the erstwhile Madhya Bharat state. It is reserved for candidates of the Scheduled tribes.

== Overview ==
Kukshi (constituency number 198) is one of the 7 Vidhan Sabha constituencies located in Dhar district. This constituency covers the Kukshi nagar panchayat and part of Kukshi tehsil of the district.

Kukshi is part of Dhar Lok Sabha constituency along with seven other Vidhan Sabha segments, namely, Sardarpur, Gandhwani, Manawar, Dharampuri, Dhar and Badnawar in this district and Dr. Ambedkar Nagar-Mhow in Indore district.

== Members of the Legislative Assembly ==
=== Madhya Bharat Legislative Assembly ===
Year	Member	Party
1952	Ratu Singh Choungad	Indian National Congress

=== Madhya Pradesh Legislative Assembly ===
Year	Member	Party
1957	Ratu Singh Choungad	Indian National Congress
1962	Babu	Bharatiya Jana Sangh
1967	Chhitusingh	Indian National Congress
1972	Pratap Singh Baghel	Indian National Congress
1977	Pratap Singh Baghel	Indian National Congress
1980	Pratap Singh Baghel	Indian National Congress (Indira)
1985	Jamuna Devi	Indian National Congress
1990	Ranjana Baghel	Bharatiya Janata Party
1993	Jamuna Devi	Indian National Congress
1998	Jamuna Devi	Indian National Congress
2003	Jamuna Devi	Indian National Congress
2008	Jamuna Devi	Indian National Congress
2011^	Mukam Singh Kirade	Bharatiya Janata Party
2013	Surendra Singh Baghel	Indian National Congress
2018	Surendra Singh Baghel	Indian National Congress
2023	Surendra Singh Baghel	Indian National Congress

^ bypoll

== Election results ==
=== 2023 ===
2023 Madhya Pradesh Legislative Assembly election: Kukshi
Party	Candidate	Votes	%	±%
INC	Surendra Singh Baghel	114,464	61.32	−4.31
BJP	Jaydeep Patel	64,576	34.59	+7.06
BSP	Ajay Rawat	2,098	1.12	−0.47
NOTA	None of the above	1,885	1.01	−0.82
Majority		49,888	26.73	−11.37
Turnout		186,680	75.71	+0.39
INC hold		Swing		

=== 2018 ===
2018 Madhya Pradesh Legislative Assembly election: Kukshi
Party	Candidate	Votes	%	±%
INC	Surendra Singh Baghel	108,391	65.63	
BJP	Virendra Singh Baghel	45,461	27.53	
AAP	Samoti Bondar Singh Muzalda	4,140	2.51	
BSP	Ajay Rawat	2,634	1.59	
BMP	Sunil Ajrawat	1,517	0.92	
NOTA	None of the above	3,016	1.83	
Majority		62,930	38.1	
Turnout		165,159	75.32	
INC hold		Swing		

=== 2013 ===
2013 Madhya Pradesh Legislative Assembly election: Kukshi
Party	Candidate	Votes	%	±%
INC	Surendra Singh Baghel	89,111	61.03	
BJP	Mukamsingh Kirade	46343	31.74	
SS	Bherusingh Mandloi	2309	1.58	N/A
BSP	Ramlal Solanki	1582	1.08	
NCP	Rajendrasingh Chouhan	1453	1.00	
Independent	Amarsingh Chouhan	1253	0.86	
NOTA	None of the Above	3964	2.71	
Majority				
Turnout		146015	71.81	
Swing to INC from BJP		Swing		
