= Elections in Madhya Pradesh =

Overview of the procedure of elections in the Indian state of Madhya Pradesh

Location of Madhya Pradesh (highlighted in red), within India

Elections in Madhya Pradesh, a state in India are conducted in accordance with the Constitution of India. The Assembly of Madhya Pradesh creates laws regarding the conduct of local body elections unilaterally while any changes by the state legislature to the conduct of state level elections need to be approved by the Parliament of India. In addition, the state legislature may be dismissed by the Parliament according to Article 356 of the Indian Constitution and President's rule may be imposed.

== Major political parties over the years ==
While some parties are currently active in the politics of Madhya Pradesh, some have been dissolved.

#	Party	Status	Abbreviation & Color
1	Indian National Congress	Active	INC
2	Bharatiya Janata Party	Active	BJP
3	Bahujan Samaj Party	Active	BSP
4	Samajwadi Party	Active	SP
5	Bharatiya Jana Sangh	Dissolved	ABJS
6	Janata Party	Dissolved	JP
7	Janata Dal	Dissolved	JD
8	Swatantra Party	Dissolved	SWA
9	Bharatiya Lok Dal	Dissolved	BLD
10	Communist Party of India	Active	CPI
11	Communist Party of India (Marxist)	Active	CPI(M)
12	Akhil Bharatiya Ram Rajya Parishad	Dissolved	RRP
13	Kisan Mazdoor Praja Party	Dissolved	KMPP
14	Gondwana Ganatantra Party	Active	GGP
15	Samyukta Socialist Party	Dissolved	SSP
16	Samyukta Vidhayak Dal	Dissolved	JD

== Lok Sabha Elections ==
Lok Sabha	Year	Total Seats	INC	BJP	Others	PM elect	PM's Party
1.	1951	29	28	-	-	Jawaharlal Nehru	INC
2.	1957	35	34	-	Party name / Seats won; HMS / 1	Jawaharlal Nehru	INC
3.	1962	36	24	-	Party name / Seats won; BJS / 3; PSP / 3	Jawaharlal Nehru	INC
4.	1967	37	25	-	Party name / Seats won; BJS / 10; SWA / 1; IND / 1	Indira Gandhi	
5.	1971	37	21	-	Party name / Seats won; BJS / 11; IND / 4	Indira Gandhi	
6.	1977	40	1	-	Party name / Seats won; JP / 38; IND / 1	Morarji Desai	JP
7.	1980	40	35	-	Party name / Seats won; JP / 4	Indira Gandhi	INC
8.	1984	40	40	0	-	Rajiv Gandhi	INC
9.	1989	38	8	27	Party name / Seats won; JD / 3	V. P. Singh	JD
10.	1991	40	27	12	Party name / Seats won; BSP / 1	P. V. Narasimha Rao	INC
11.	1996	40	8	27	Party name / Seats won; BSP / 2	Atal Bihari Vajpayee	BJP
12.	1998	40	10	30	-	Atal Bihari Vajpayee	BJP
13.	1999	40	11	29	-	Atal Bihari Vajpayee	BJP
14.	2004	29	4	25	-	Manmohan Singh	INC
15.	2009	29	12	16	Party name / Seats won; BSP / 1	Manmohan Singh	INC
16.	2014	29	2	27	-	Narendra Modi	BJP
17.	2019	29	1	28	-	Narendra Modi	BJP
17.	2024	29	0	29	-	Narendra Modi	BJP

=== From 1989 to 2000 ===
Total Seats- 40

Lok Sabha	Election Year	1st Party	2nd Party	3rd Party	Others	Prime Minister	PM's Party
9th Lok Sabha	1989	BJP 27	INC 8	JD 3	Ind 1	V. P. Singh	JD
9th Lok Sabha	1990	BJP 27	INC 8	JD 3	Ind 1	Chandra Shekhar	SJP
10th Lok Sabha	1991	INC 27	BJP 12	BSP 1		P.V. Narasimha Rao	INC
11th Lok Sabha	1996	BJP 27	INC 8	BSP 2	AIIC(T) 1, MPVC 1, Ind 1	Atal Bihari Vajpayee	BJP
11th Lok Sabha	1996	BJP 27	INC 8	BSP 2	AIIC(T) 1, MPVC 1, Ind 1	H.D. Deve Gowda	JD
11th Lok Sabha	1997	BJP 27	INC 8	BSP 2	AIIC(T) 1, MPVC 1, Ind 1	I.K. Gujral	JD
12th Lok Sabha	1998	BJP 30	INC 10			Atal Bihari Vajpayee	BJP
13th Lok Sabha	1999	BJP 29	INC 11			Atal Bihari Vajpayee	BJP

=== After 2000 ===
Total Seats- 29

Lok Sabha	Election Year	1st Party	2nd Party	3rd Party	Prime Minister	PM's Party
14th Lok Sabha	2004	BJP 25	INC 4		Manmohan Singh	INC
15th Lok Sabha	2009	BJP 16	INC 12	BSP 1	Manmohan Singh	INC
16th Lok Sabha	2014	BJP 27	INC 2		Narendra Modi	BJP
17th Lok Sabha	2019	BJP 28	INC 1		Narendra Modi	BJP
18th Lok Sabha	2024	BJP 29			Narendra Modi	BJP

== Vidhan Sabha elections ==
Colour key for parties
BJP
INC
JP
SVD

LA	Year	Total Seats	INC	BJP	Others	Chief Minister	Party
1.	1952	232	194	-	Party name / Seats won; KMPP / 8; RRP / 3; SP / 2; SKP / 2; IND / 23	Chief Minister / Tenure; Ravishankar Shukla / 1 November 1956 - 31 December 1956; Bhagwantrao Mandloi / 1 January 1957 - 30 January 1957; Kailash Nath Katju / 31 January 1957 - 11 March 1962	INC
2.	1957	288	232	-	Party name / Seats won; PSP / 12; BJS / 10; HM / 7; RRP / 5; CPI / 2; IND / 20	Kailash Nath Katju	INC
3.	1962	288	142	-	Party name / Seats won; JS / 41; PSP / 33; SOC / 14; RRP / 10; HM / 6; SWA / 2; CPI / 1; IND / 39	Chief Minister / Tenure; Bhagwantrao Mandloi / 12 March 1962 - 29 September 1963; Dwarka Prasad Mishra / 31 September 1963 - 8 March 1967	INC
4.	1967 (Note: In the elections held in the year 1967, the INC won 167 seats but its leader Govind Narayan Singh broke away with the party and formed the SVD, which along with other parties formed the government with Govind Narayan Singh as the Chief Minister)	296	167	-	Party name / Seats won; BJS / 78; SWA / 7; SSP / 10	Chief Minister / Tenure; Govind Narayan Singh / 30 July 1967 - 12 March 1969; Nareshchandra Singh / 13 March 1969 - 25 March 1969; Shyama Charan Shukla / 26 March 1969 - 28 January 1972	SVD
5.	1972	296	220	-	Party name / Seats won; BJS / 48; SSP / 7; CPI / 3; IND / 18	Chief Minister / Tenure; Prakash Chandra Sethi / 29 January 1972 - 22 December 1975; Shyama Charan Shukla / 23 December 1975 - 29 April 1977	INC
6.	1977	320	84	-	Party name / Seats won; JP / 230; RRP / 1; IND / 5	Chief Minister / Tenure; Kailash Joshi / 24 June 1977 - 17 January 1978; Virendra Kumar Saklecha / 18 January 1978 - 19 January 1980; Sundar Lal Patwa / 20 January 1980 - 17 February 1980	JP
7.	1980	320	246	60	Party name / Seats won; JP / 2; CPI / 2; JP(S) / 1; RPK / 1; IND / 8	Arjun Singh	INC
8.	1985	320	250	58	Party name / Seats won; JP / 5; INC(S) / 1; IND / 6	Chief Minister / Tenure; Motilal Vora / 13 March 1985 - 13 February 1988; Arjun Singh / 14 February 1988 - 24 January 1989; Motilal Vora / 25 January 1989 - 8 December 1989	INC
9.	1990	320	56	220	Party name / Seats won; JD / 28; CPI / 3; BSP / 2; KSM / 1; IND / 10	Sunder Lal Patwa	BJP
10.	1993	320	174	117	Party name / Seats won; BSP / 11; JD / 4; CPI / 2; CPI(M) / 1; CMM / 1; KSM / 1; RPI(K) / 1; IND / 8	Digvijaya Singh	INC
11.	1998	320	172	119	Party name / Seats won; BSP / 11; JD / 4; SP / 4; GGP / 1; ABP / 1; JP / 1; RPI / 1; IND / 8	Digvijaya Singh	INC
12.	2003	230	38	173	Party name / Seats won; SP / 7; GGP / 3; BSP / 2; RSD / 2; IND / 2	Chief Minister / Tenure; Uma Bharti / 8 December 2003 - 22 August 2004; Babulal Gaur / 22 August 2004 - 29 November 2005; Shivraj Singh Chouhan / 29 November 2005 - 16 December 2018	BJP
13.	2008	230	71	143	Party name / Seats won; BSP / 7; BJSP / 5; SP / 1; IND / 3	Shivraj Singh Chouhan	BJP
14.	2013	230	58	165	Party name / Seats won; BSP / 4; IND / 3	Shivraj Singh Chouhan	BJP
15.	2018	230	114	109	Party name / Seats won; BSP / 2; SP / 1; IND / 4	Kamal Nath	INC
16.	2020	230	96	126	Party name / Seats won; BSP / 2; SP / 1; IND / 4	Shivraj Singh Chouhan	BJP
17.	2023	230	66	163	Party name / Seats won; BAP / 1	Mohan Yadav	BJP

=== After 2000 ===
Total Seats- 230

Vidhan Sabha	Election Year	1st Party	2nd Party	3rd Party	Others	Chief Minister	CM's Party
12th	2003	BJP 173	INC 38	SP 7	GGP: 3, BSP: 2, RSD: 2, IND: 2	Uma Bharti	BJP
12th	2003	BJP 173	INC 38	SP 7	GGP: 3, BSP: 2, RSD: 2, IND: 2	Babulal Gaur	BJP
12th	2003	BJP 173	INC 38	SP 7	GGP: 3, BSP: 2, RSD: 2, IND: 2	Shivraj Singh Chouhan	BJP
13th	2008	BJP 143	INC 71	BSP 7	BJSP:5, SP: 1, IND: 3	Shivraj Singh Chouhan	BJP
14th	2013	BJP 165	INC 58	BSP 4	IND: 3	Shivraj Singh Chouhan	BJP
15th	2018	INC 114	BJP 109	BSP 2	SP 1, IND 4	Kamal Nath	INC
15th	2020 bypolls	BJP 126	INC 96	BSP 2	SP 1, IND 4	Shivraj Singh Chouhan	BJP
16th	2023	BJP 163	INC 66	BAP 1		Mohan Yadav	BJP
