= 1996 Indian general election in Madhya Pradesh =

General Election in Madhya Pradesh

Indian general election in Madhya Pradesh, 1996
- April–May 1996

40 seats
	First party	Second party
	BJP	INC
Party	BJP	INC
Seats before	12	27
Seats won	27	8
Seat change	▲15	▼19
Prime Minister before election
P. V. Narasimha Rao
INC
Prime Minister after election
Atal Bihari Vajpayee
BJP

In the 1996 Indian general election for Madhya Pradesh polls were held for 40 seats in the state. The result was a major victory for the Bharatiya Janata Party (BJP) which won 27 seats.Indian National Congress (INC) fared poorly in this election and managed to won only 8 seats.

== Parties and alliances ==
=== Bharatiya Janata Party ===
Party	Flag	Symbol	Leader	Seats contested
Bharatiya Janata Party			L. K. Advani	39
Madhya Pradesh Vikas Congress			Madhavrao Scindia	1

=== Indian National Congress ===
Party	Flag	Symbol	Leader	Seats contested
Indian National Congress			Digvijaya Singh	40

=== Others ===
Party	flag	Symbol	Leader	Seats contested
All India Indira Congress (Tiwari)			Narayan Dutt Tiwari	33
Bahujan Samaj Party			Mayawati	28

== List of Candidates ==
Constituency		BJP+		INC		BSP		AIIC(T)	
#	Name	Party	Candidate	Party	Candidate	Party	Candidate	Party	Candidate
1	Morena (SC)	BJP	Ashok Argal	INC	Babulal Solanki	BSP	Pritam Ps. Choudhary	AIIC(T)	Mukat Singh Sakhwar
2	Bhind	BJP	Ram Lakhan Singh	INC	Vishwanath Sharma	BSP	Kedar Nath Kushwah	AIIC(T)	Rajesh Bhadoria
3	Gwalior	MPVC	Madhavrao Scindia	INC	Shashibhushan Bajpai	BSP	Phool Singh Baraiya		
4	Guna	BJP	Vijaya Raje Scindia	INC	K. P. Singh	BSP	Prakash Dhakad	AIIC(T)	Sardar Raghuwanshi
5	Sagar (SC)	BJP	Virendra Khatik	INC	Anand Ahirwar	BSP	Jaikaran Saket	AIIC(T)	Uttam Khatik
6	Khajuraho	BJP	Uma Bharti	INC	Manvendra Singh	BSP	R. D. Prajapati		
7	Damoh	BJP	Ramkrishna Kusmaria	INC	Mukesh Nayak	BSP	Sukhnandan Patel	AIIC(T)	Raj Bahadur Singh
8	Satna	BJP	Virendra Sakhlecha	INC	Toshan Singh	BSP	Sukhlal Kushwaha	AIIC(T)	Arjun Singh
9	Rewa	BJP	Parveen Kumari	INC	Sundar Lal Tiwari	BSP	Buddha Hasen Patel		
10	Sidhi (ST)	BJP	Manik Singh	INC	Moti Lal Singh	BSP	Basanti	AIIC(T)	Tilak Raj Singh
11	Shahdol (ST)	BJP	Gyan Singh	INC	Dalabir Singh	BSP	Phunde Lal Singh		
12	Surguja (ST)	BJP	Larangsai	INC	Khelsai Singh			AIIC(T)	Bhanu Pratap Singh
13	Raigarh (ST)	BJP	Nand Kumar Sai	INC	Pushpa Devi Singh			AIIC(T)	Shrimati Uma Rathiya
14	Janjgir	BJP	Manaharan Lal Pandey	INC	Bhawanilal Verma	BSP	Chaitram Chandra	AIIC(T)	Bodh Ram
15	Bilaspur (SC)	BJP	Punnulal Mohle	INC	Khelan Ram	BSP	T. R. Nirala	AIIC(T)	Banshi Lal
16	Sarangarh (SC)	BJP	Shyamsundar Ratre	INC	Paras Ram Bhardwaj	BSP	Dauram Ratnakar	AIIC(T)	K. P. Haripriya
17	Raipur	BJP	Ramesh Vaish	INC	Dhanender Sahu	BSP	Vishnu Baghel		
18	Mahasamund	BJP	Chandra Sekhar	INC	Pawan Diwan	BSP	Janki Devi Dhruv	AIIC(T)	Chandrika Sahu
19	Kanker (ST)	BJP	Sohan Potai	INC	Chhabila Arvind Netam	BSP	J. R. Thakur	AIIC(T)	Jhumuklal Vhendia
20	Bastar (ST)	BJP	Rajaram Todem	INC	Mankuram Sodhi			AIIC(T)	Ganga Potai
21	Durg	BJP	Tarachand Sahu	INC	Pyare Lal Belchandan	BSP	Paras Nath Patel	AIIC(T)	Anjan Lal Chandrakar
22	Rajnandgaon	BJP	Ashok Sharma	INC	Shivendra Singh	BSP	Ashok Sahu	AIIC(T)	Balbir Khanuja
23	Balaghat	BJP	Gaurishankar Bisen	INC	Vishveshwar Bhagat	BSP	Vijay Beniram Vare		
24	Mandla (ST)	BJP	Faggan Kulaste	INC	Mohan Lal	BSP	Rajendera Singh	AIIC(T)	Maniklal
25	Jabalpur	BJP	Baburao Paranjpe	INC	Sarvankumar Patel	BSP	Ashok Patel	AIIC(T)	Chandrika Ps. Tripathi
26	Seoni	BJP	Prahlad Singh Patel	INC	Vimla Verma	BSP	Shyam Dhurvey	AIIC(T)	Shashibhusan Singh
27	Chhindwara	BJP	Chandrabhan Singh	INC	Alka Nath				
28	Betul	BJP	Vijay Khandelwal	INC	Aslam Sher Khan			AIIC(T)	Vishnu Rajoriya
29	Hoshangabad	BJP	Sartaj Singh	INC	Rameshwar Neekhra	BSP	Munna Lal Patel	AIIC(T)	Nageen Kochar
30	Bhopal	BJP	Sushil Chandra	INC	Kailash Agnihotri			AIIC(T)	Lalit Shrivastava
31	Vidisha	BJP	Shivraj Singh Chouhan	INC	Hirdai Mohan Jain	BSP	Nathoo Ram Lodhi	AIIC(T)	Naresh Jain
32	Rajgarh	BJP	Pyarelal Khandelwal	INC	Lakshman Singh	BSP	Jagdish Suryavanshi	AIIC(T)	Rajyavardhan Singh
33	Shajapur (SC)	BJP	Thawar Chand Gehlot	INC	Shakuntala Chouhan			AIIC(T)	Puran Lal Malviya
34	Khandwa	BJP	Nandkumar Chauhan	INC	Shiv Kumar Singh	BSP	Ganshyam Choudhari	AIIC(T)	Salim Patel Hazi
35	Khargone	BJP	Rameshwar Patidar	INC	Bodar Singh Kalu			AIIC(T)	Rajinder Chauhan
36	Dhar (ST)	BJP	Chhatar Darbar	INC	Suraj Bhanu Solanki			AIIC(T)	Goverdhansinh Mukati
37	Indore	BJP	Sumitra Mahajan	INC	Madhukar Verma			AIIC(T)	Anil Lalbhadur
38	Ujjain (SC)	BJP	Satyanarayan Jatiya	INC	Sidhnatha Parihar	BSP	Bhanwarsingh Gangwal	AIIC(T)	Bapulal Malviya
39	Jhabua (ST)	BJP	Bhagirath Bhanwar	INC	Dileep Bhuria			AIIC(T)	Prabhudayal Ghehalot
40	Mandsaur	BJP	Laxminarayan Pandey	INC	Ghanshyam Patidar			AIIC(T)	Arvind Chopra

== Result ==
=== Results by Party ===
Party/Alliance		Popular vote			Seats		
Party/Alliance		Votes	%	±pp	Contested	Won	+/−
BJP+	BJP	94,72,940	41.32	▼0.56	39	27	▲15
BJP+	MPVC	3,37,539	1.47	New entry	1	1	▲1
BJP+	Total	98,10,479	42.79	Steady	40	28	▲16
INC		71,11,753	31.02	▼14.32	40	8	▼19
BSP		18,74,594	8.18	▲4.64	28	2	▲1
AIIC(T)		10,78,589	4.70	New entry	33	1	▲1
JD		2,41,119	1.05	▼3.19	8	0	Steady
CPI		1,68,448	0.73	▲0.31	4	0	
Others		4,45,775	1.94	Steady	60	0	Steady
IND		21,94,115	9.57		1046	1	Steady
Total		2,29,24,872	100%	-	1259	40	-

=== Constituency-wise results ===
Constituency		Winner				Runner Up				Margin	%
#	Name	Candidate	Party	Votes	%	Candidate	Party	Votes	%	Margin	%
1	Morena (SC)	Ashok Argal	BJP	1,72,675	42.58	Pritam Prasad Choudhary	BSP	1,34,696	33.21	37,979	9.37
2	Bhind	Ram Lakhan Singh	BJP	1,98,109	39.21	Kedar Nath Kushwah	BSP	1,82,311	36.08	15,798	3.13
3	Gwalior	Madhavrao Scindia	MPVC	3,37,539	66.33	Phool Singh Baraiya	BSP	1,13,545	22.31	2,23,994	44.02
4	Guna	Vijaya Raje Scindia	BJP	2,72,633	49.78	K.P. Singh	INC	1,41,809	25.89	1,30,824	23.89
5	Sagar (SC)	Virendra Kumar Khatik	BJP	2,45,106	52.25	Anand Ahirwar	INC	96,789	20.63	1,48,317	31.62
6	Khajuraho	Uma Bharti	BJP	2,94,472	45.27	Manvendra Singh	INC	1,63,382	25.12	1,31,090	20.15
7	Damoh	Ramkrishna Kusmaria	BJP	3,03,476	50.89	Mukesh Nayak	INC	1,35,219	22.67	1,68,257	28.22
8	Satna	Sukhlal Kushwaha	BSP	1,82,497	28.37	Virendra Kumar Sakhlecha	BJP	1,60,259	24.91	22,238	3.46
9	Rewa	Buddha Hasen Patel	BSP	1,58,379	26.91	Parveen Kumari	BJP	1,45,997	24.81	12,382	2.10
10	Sidhi (ST)	Tilak Raj Singh	AIIC(T)	1,68,340	26.40	Manik Singh	BJP	1,60,136	25.11	8,204	1.29
11	Shahdol (ST)	Gyan Singh	BJP	2,10,946	33.92	Dalabir Singh	INC	1,57,551	25.34	53,395	8.58
12	Surguja (ST)	Khelsai Singh	INC	2,61,213	41.06	Larang Sai	BJP	2,52,442	39.68	8,771	1.38
13	Raigarh (ST)	Nand Kumar Sai	BJP	2,61,080	42.25	Pushpa Devi Singh	INC	2,51,882	40.76	9,198	1.49
14	Janjgir	Manharan Lal Pandey	BJP	1,98,600	30.75	Bhawani Lal Verma	INC	1,64,868	25.53	33,732	5.22
15	Bilaspur (SC)	Punnulal Mohle	BJP	2,26,054	41.96	Khelan Ram Jangde	INC	1,91,174	35.49	34,880	6.47
16	Sarangarh (SC)	Paras Ram Bhardwaj	INC	2,18,055	39.88	Dauram Ratnakar	BSP	1,84,778	33.79	33,277	6.09
17	Raipur	Ramesh Bais	BJP	2,52,990	45.56	Dhanender Sahu	INC	2,02,251	36.42	50,739	9.14
18	Mahasamund	Pawan Diwan	INC	2,50,521	41.41	Chandra Shekhar Sahu	BJP	2,43,581	40.26	6,940	1.15
19	Kanker (ST)	Chhabila Netam	INC	2,19,191	39.77	Sohan Potai	BJP	1,94,771	35.34	24,420	4.43
20	Bastar (ST)	Mahendra Karma	IND	1,24,322	32.15	Manku Ram Sodhi	INC	1,10,265	28.51	14,057	3.64
21	Durg	Tarachand Sahu	BJP	2,69,450	42.35	Pyare Lal Belchandan	INC	2,43,703	38.31	25,747	4.04
22	Rajnandgaon	Ashok Sharma	BJP	2,22,616	44.67	Shivendra Bahadur Singh	INC	1,63,340	32.78	59,276	11.89
23	Balaghat	Vishveshwar Bhagat	INC	1,71,569	30.91	Gaurishankar Bisen	BJP	1,70,312	30.68	1,257	0.23
24	Mandla (ST)	Faggan Singh Kulaste	BJP	2,46,334	44.89	Mohanlal	INC	1,81,714	33.11	64,620	11.78
25	Jabalpur	Baburao Paranjape	BJP	2,56,621	49.09	Sarvankumar Patel	INC	1,62,941	31.17	93,680	17.92
26	Seoni	Prahlad Singh Patel	BJP	2,62,373	43.64	Vimla Verma	INC	1,97,526	32.85	64,847	10.79
27	Chhindwara	Alka Nath	INC	2,81,414	46.69	Chandrabhan Singh	BJP	2,60,032	43.14	21,382	3.55
28	Betul	Vijay Kumar Khandelwal	BJP	2,60,259	52.22	Aslam Sher Khan	INC	1,48,183	29.74	1,12,076	22.48
29	Hoshangabad	Sartaj Singh	BJP	2,69,084	47.58	Rameshwar Neekhra	INC	2,16,557	38.30	52,527	9.28
30	Bhopal	Sushil Chandra Varma	BJP	3,53,427	49.27	Kailash Agnihotri (Kundal)	INC	2,02,533	28.24	1,50,894	21.03
31	Vidisha	Shivraj Singh Chouhan	BJP	3,10,580	54.15	Hirdai Mohan Jain	INC	1,34,822	23.51	1,75,758	30.64
32	Rajgarh	Laxman Singh	INC	2,57,218	43.68	Pyarelal Khandelwal	BJP	2,32,017	39.40	25,201	4.28
33	Shajapur (SC)	Thawarchand Gehlot	BJP	3,42,924	56.31	Shakuntala Chouhan	INC	2,13,285	35.02	1,29,639	21.29
34	Khandwa	Nandkumar Singh Chauhan	BJP	2,89,099	50.49	Shiv Kumar Singh Naval Singh	INC	1,94,749	34.01	94,350	16.48
35	Khargone	Rameshwar Patidar	BJP	2,86,549	49.26	Bodar Singh Kalu Singh Mandloi	INC	2,41,342	41.49	45,207	7.77
36	Dhar (ST)	Chhatar Singh Darbar	BJP	2,98,741	51.43	Suraj Bhanu Solanki	INC	2,17,130	37.38	81,611	14.05
37	Indore	Sumitra Mahajan	BJP	3,38,327	50.94	Madhukar Verma	INC	2,33,894	35.22	1,04,433	15.72
38	Ujjain (SC)	Satyanarayan Jatiya	BJP	3,06,935	53.06	Sidhnatha Parihar	INC	1,95,678	33.83	1,11,257	19.23
39	Jhabua (ST)	Dileep Singh Bhuria	INC	1,88,933	39.78	Bhagirath Bhanwar	BJP	1,61,034	33.90	27,899	5.88
40	Mandsaur	Laxminarayan Pandey	BJP	3,45,896	49.69	Ganshyam Patidar Nehrulal	INC	2,66,048	38.22	79,848	11.47
