= 1998 Indian general election in Madhya Pradesh =

General Election in Madhya Pradesh

Indian general election in Madhya Pradesh, 1998
- Feb 1998

40 seats
	First party	Second party
	BJP	INC
Party	BJP	INC
Seats before	27	8
Seats won	30	10
Seat change	▲3	▲2
Prime Minister before election
I. K. Gujral
JD
Prime Minister after election
A. B. Vajpayee
BJP

In the 1998 Indian general election for Madhya Pradesh polls were held for 40 seats in the state. The result was a major victory for the Bharatiya Janata Party (BJP) which won 30 seats. The remaining 10 seats were won by Indian National Congress (INC).

== Parties and alliances ==
=== National Democratic Alliance ===
Party	Flag	Symbol	Leader	Seats contested
Bharatiya Janata Party			L. K. Advani	40

=== Indian National Congress ===
Party	Flag	Symbol	Leader	Seats contested
Indian National Congress			Madhavrao Scindia	40

=== Others ===
Party	flag	Symbol	Leader	Seats contested
Bahujan Samaj Party			Mayawati	35
Gondwana Ganatantra Party			Hira Singh Markam	18
Janata Party			Subramanian Swamy	18
Samajwadi Party			Mulayam Singh Yadav	12

== Result ==
Results of Indian general election, 1998 in Madhya Pradesh
Parties and coalitions	Seats			Popular vote		
Parties and coalitions	Contested	Won	+/−	Votes	%	±pp
Bharatiya Janata Party	40	30	▲3	1,23,15,405	45.73%	▲4.41%
Indian National Congress	40	10	▲2	1,06,11,317	39.4%	▲8.38%
Bahujan Samaj Party	35	0	-	23,43,027	8.7%	▲0.52%
Janata Party	18	0	-	3,28,989	1.22%	▲1.14%
Samajwadi Party	12	0	-	1,75,461	0.65%	▲0.57%
Gondwana Ganatantra Party	12	0	-	1,78,447	0.66%	▲0.62%
Independents	128	0	-	3,55,110	1.32%	▼8.25%
Total	40			2,69,30,007		
Invalid votes	6,06,377	2.2				
Votes cast / turnout	2,75,41,607	61.74				
Registered voters	4,46,07,368	100.00				

== Constituency-wise results ==
Keys: BJP (30) INC (10)

Constituency		Winner				Runner Up				Margin	%
#	Name	Candidate	Party	Votes	%	Candidate	Party	Votes	%	Margin	%
1	Morena (SC)	Ashok Argal	BJP	2,77,499	43.44	Pritam Prasad	BSP	2,09,378	32.77	68,121	10.67
2	Bhind	Ram Lakhan Singh	BJP	2,92,682	42.27	Kedar Nath Kachhi	BSP	1,93,774	27.99	98,908	14.28
3	Gwalior	Madhavrao Scindia	INC	2,84,365	39.77	Jaibhan Singh Pawaiya	BJP	2,58,086	36.09	26,279	3.68
4	Guna	Vijaya Raje Scindia	BJP	3,36,151	46.67	Devendra Singh	INC	2,33,153	32.37	1,02,998	14.30
5	Sagar (SC)	Virendra Kumar Khatik	BJP	3,36,638	56.99	Nandlal Choudhary	INC	1,88,234	31.87	1,48,404	25.12
6	Khajuraho	Uma Bharti	BJP	3,51,607	43.40	Shriram	INC	2,47,760	30.58	1,03,847	12.82
7	Damoh	Ramkrishna Kusmaria	BJP	3,12,057	44.40	Nareshchand	INC	1,81,459	25.82	1,30,598	18.58
8	Satna	Ramanand Singh	BJP	2,63,011	36.58	Rajendra Kumar Singh	INC	2,18,526	30.39	44,485	6.19
9	Rewa	Chandramani Tripathi	BJP	2,76,367	36.68	Bhim Singh Patel	BSP	2,07,394	27.53	68,973	9.15
10	Sidhi (ST)	Jagannath Singh	BJP	2,75,803	38.89	Tilak Raj Singh	INC	2,29,271	32.33	46,532	6.56
11	Shahdol (ST)	Gyan Singh	BJP	2,96,764	43.76	Dalveer Singh	INC	2,57,030	37.90	39,734	5.86
12	Surguja (ST)	Larang Sai	BJP	2,95,452	44.48	Khelsai Singh	INC	2,74,832	41.37	20,620	3.11
13	Raigarh (ST)	Ajit Jogi	INC	3,25,112	48.27	Nand Kumar Sai	BJP	3,20,730	47.62	4,382	0.65
14	Janjgir	Charandas Mahant	INC	2,90,175	40.50	Manharan Lal Pandey	BJP	2,45,589	34.28	44,586	6.22
15	Bilaspur (SC)	Punnulal Mohle	BJP	2,74,793	47.60	Kanya Kumari	INC	2,26,178	39.18	48,615	8.42
16	Sarangarh (SC)	Paras Ram Bhardwaj	INC	2,17,558	34.62	P.R. Khute	BJP	2,11,171	33.60	6,387	1.02
17	Raipur	Ramesh Bais	BJP	3,44,380	49.42	Vidya Charan Shukla	INC	2,61,001	37.46	83,379	11.96
18	Mahasamund	Chandra Shekhar Sahu	BJP	3,32,874	49.76	Pawan Diwan	INC	2,85,142	42.62	47,732	7.14
19	Kanker (ST)	Sohan Potai	BJP	2,70,121	45.97	Mahendra Karma	INC	2,15,751	36.72	54,370	9.25
20	Bastar (ST)	Baliram Kashyap	BJP	1,51,484	42.27	Manku Ram Sodhi	INC	1,34,603	37.56	16,881	4.71
21	Durg	Tarachand Sahu	BJP	3,84,901	50.45	Jageshwar Sahu	INC	3,16,183	41.45	68,718	9.00
22	Rajnandgaon	Motilal Vora	INC	3,04,709	50.61	Ashok Sharma	BJP	2,52,468	41.93	52,241	8.68
23	Balaghat	Gaurishankar Bisen	BJP	2,40,066	40.27	Vishaveshwar Bhagat	INC	2,14,535	35.99	25,531	4.28
24	Mandla (ST)	Faggan Singh Kulaste	BJP	2,68,739	47.74	Chhote Lal Uike	INC	2,55,227	45.34	13,512	2.40
25	Jabalpur	Baburao Paranjpe	BJP	3,00,584	46.86	Alok Chansoria	INC	2,16,469	33.75	84,115	13.11
26	Seoni	Vimla Varma	INC	3,12,097	47.88	Prahlad Singh Patel	BJP	2,88,376	44.24	23,721	3.64
27	Chhindwara	Kamalnath	INC	4,06,249	58.40	Sunder Lal Patwa	BJP	2,52,851	36.35	1,53,398	22.05
28	Betul	Vijay Kumar Khandelwal	BJP	2,84,091	50.54	Ashok Sable	INC	2,44,425	43.48	39,666	7.06
29	Hoshangabad	Sartaj Singh	BJP	3,87,395	53.15	Arjun Singh	INC	3,18,414	43.68	68,981	9.47
30	Bhopal	Sushil Chandra Verma	BJP	4,94,481	57.44	Arif Beg	INC	3,00,549	34.91	1,93,932	22.53
31	Vidisha	Shivraj Singh Chouhan	BJP	3,74,406	56.99	Ashutosh Dayal Sharma	INC	2,36,548	36.01	1,37,858	20.98
32	Rajgarh	Laxman Singh	INC	3,52,289	50.13	Kailash Joshi	BJP	2,96,055	42.12	56,234	8.01
33	Shajapur (SC)	Thawarchand Gehlot	BJP	3,71,571	49.03	Sajjan Singh Verma	INC	3,52,577	46.52	18,994	2.51
34	Khandwa	Nandkumar Singh Chauhan	BJP	3,34,340	51.80	Thakur Mahendra Singh	INC	2,89,820	44.90	44,520	6.90
35	Khargone	Rameshwar Patidar	BJP	3,11,394	48.31	Bondarsingh	INC	2,90,715	45.11	20,679	3.20
36	Dhar (ST)	Gajendra Singh Rajukhedi	INC	3,44,858	51.29	Hemlata Chhatar Darbar	BJP	3,23,765	48.16	21,093	3.13
37	Indore	Sumitra Mahajan	BJP	4,40,047	52.00	Pankaj Sanghvi	INC	3,90,195	46.11	49,852	5.89
38	Ujjain (SC)	Satyanarayan Jatiya	BJP	3,48,405	56.07	Avantika Prasad Marmat	INC	2,54,518	40.96	93,887	15.11
39	Jhabua (ST)	Kantilal Bhuria	INC	3,07,735	53.05	Dileep Singh Bhuria	BJP	2,25,362	38.85	82,373	14.20
40	Mandsaur	Laxminarayan Pandey	BJP	4,12,849	49.43	Narendra Nahata	INC	3,95,147	47.31	17,702	2.12

== Post-election Union Council of Ministers from Madhya Pradesh ==
#	Name	Constituency	Designation	Department	From	To	Party
1	Sikander Bakht	Rajya Sabha	Cabinet Minister	Industry	19 March 1998	13 October 1999	BJP
2	Satyanarayan Jatiya	Ujjain (SC)	Cabinet Minister	Labour	19 March 1998	13 October 1999	BJP
3	Uma Bharti	Khajuraho	MoS	Human Resource Development	19 March 1998	13 October 1999	BJP
3	Uma Bharti	Khajuraho	MoS (I/C)	Department of Youth Affairs, Sports, Women and Child Development	1 March 1999	13 October 1999	BJP
4	Ramesh Bais	Raipur	MoS	Steel	19 March 1998	13 October 1999	BJP
4	Ramesh Bais	Raipur	MoS	Mines	19 March 1998	13 October 1999	BJP

references :-
