= Pratap Singh Bhagel =

Indian politician

Member of Parliament, Lok Sabha
- In office 1984-1989
- Preceded by: Fatehbhanusinh
- Succeeded by: Surajbhanu Solanki
- Constituency: Dhar, Madhya Pradesh

Member of the Madhya Pradesh Legislative Assembly
- In office 1972–1985
- Preceded by: Chhitusingh
- Succeeded by: Jamuna Devi
- In office 1993–1998
- Preceded by: Jhinga Lal Patel
- Succeeded by: Jagdish Muvel
- Constituency: Dharampuri

Personal details
- Born: 3 November 1946 Talawadi Village, Dhar District, British India (now Madhya Pradesh, India)
- Died: 5 January 2017 (aged 70)
- Party: Indian National Congress
- Spouse: Chandra Kumari Baghel

Pratap Singh Bhagel was an Indian politician. He was elected to the lower House of Parliament the Lok Sabha from Dhar, Madhya Pradesh as a member of the Indian National Congress.
