= Dhar Lok Sabha constituency =

Lok Sabha Constituency in Madhya Pradesh, India

Coordinates: 22.598°N 75.304°E

Dhar
- Lok Sabha constituency
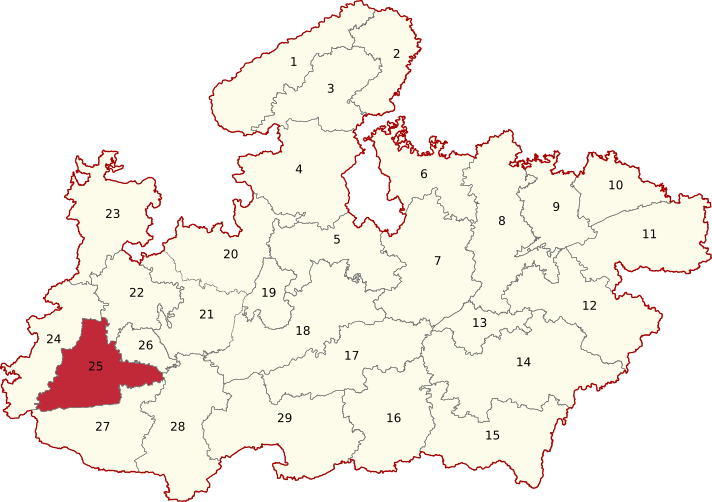
- Dhar Lok Sabha constituency within Madhya Pradesh

Constituency details
- Country: India
- Region: Central India
- State: Madhya Pradesh
- Assembly constituencies: Sardarpur; Gandhwani; Kukshi; Manawar; Dharampuri; Dhar; Badnawar; Dr. Ambedkar Nagar-Mhow
- Established: 1962
- Total electors: 1,193,065
- Reservation: ST

Member of Parliament
- 18th Lok Sabha
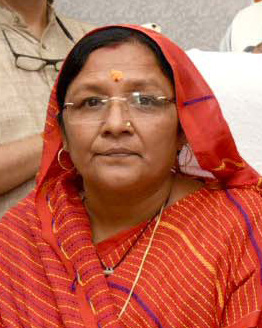
- Incumbent Savitri Thakur
- Party: BJP
- Elected year: 2024

Dhar Lok Sabha constituency is one of the 29 Lok Sabha constituencies in the Indian state of Madhya Pradesh. This constituency is reserved for the Scheduled Tribes. This constituency came into existence in 1967. It covers the entire Dhar district and part of Indore district.

== Assembly segments ==
Presently, Dhar Lok Sabha constituency comprises the following eight Vidhan Sabha segments:

#	Name	District	Member	Party	2024 Lead
196	Sardarpur (ST)	Dhar	Pratap Grewal	INC	BJP
197	Gandhwani (ST)	Dhar	Umang Singhar	INC	INC
198	Kukshi (ST)	Dhar	Surendra Singh Baghel	INC	INC
199	Manawar (ST)	Dhar	Dr. Hiralal Alawa	INC	INC
200	Dharampuri (ST)	Dhar	Kalu Singh Thakur	BJP	BJP
201	Dhar	Dhar	Neena Verma	BJP	BJP
202	Badnawar	Dhar	Bhanwar Singh Shekhawat	INC	BJP
209	Dr. Ambedkar Nagar-Mhow	Indore	Usha Thakur	BJP	BJP

== Members of Parliament ==
Year	Member	Party
1962	Bharat Singh Chowhan	Bharatiya Jana Sangh
1967	Bharat Singh Chowhan	Bharatiya Jana Sangh
1971	Bharat Singh Chowhan	Bharatiya Jana Sangh
1977	Bharat Singh Chowhan	Janata Party
1980	Fatehbhanusinh	Indian National Congress (I)
1984	Pratapsingh Bhagel	Indian National Congress
1989	Suraj Bhanu Solanki	Indian National Congress
1991	Suraj Bhanu Solanki	Indian National Congress
1996	Chhatar Singh Darbar	Bharatiya Janata Party
1998	Gajendra Singh Rajukhedi	Indian National Congress
1999	Gajendra Singh Rajukhedi	Indian National Congress
2004	Chhatar Singh Darbar	Bharatiya Janata Party
2009	Gajendra Singh Rajukhedi	Indian National Congress
2014	Savitri Thakur	Bharatiya Janata Party
2019	Chattar Singh Darbar	Bharatiya Janata Party
2024	Savitri Thakur	Bharatiya Janata Party

== Election results ==
=== 2024 ===
2024 Indian general election: Dhar
Party	Candidate	Votes	%	±%
BJP	Savitri Thakur	794,449	55.75	▲2.02
INC	Radheshyam Muvel	575,784	40.04	▼2.08
NOTA	None of the above	15,651	1.10	
Majority		218,665	15.71	
Turnout		14,25,044		
BJP hold		Swing		

2019 Indian general elections: Dhar
Party	Candidate	Votes	%	±%
BJP	Chattar Singh Darbar	722,147	53.73	
INC	Girwal Dinesh	5,66,118	42.12	
NOTA	None of the Above	17,929	1.33	
BSP	Gulsingh Ramsingh Kawache	13,827	1.03	
Majority		1,56,029	11.61	
Turnout		13,44,174	75.26	+10.72
BJP hold		Swing		

2014 Indian general elections: Dhar
Party	Candidate	Votes	%	±%
BJP	Savitri Thakur	558,387	51.84	
INC	Umang Singhar	4,54,059	42.16	
NOTA	None of the Above	15,437	1.43	
Majority		1,04,328	9.68	
Turnout		10,76,816	64.54	
BJP gain from INC		Swing		

2009 Indian general elections: Dhar
Party	Candidate	Votes	%	±%
INC	Gajendra Singh Rajukhedi	3,02,660	46.21	
BJP	Mukam Singh Kirade	2,99,999	45.81	
BSP	Ajay Rawat	16,082	2.46	
Majority		2,661	0.41	
Turnout		6,54,736	54.69	
INC gain from BJP		Swing		

== See also ==
- Dhar district
- List of constituencies of the Lok Sabha
