= Pali-Tanakhar Assembly constituency =

Legislative Assembly constituency in Chhattisgarh State, India

Coordinates: 22.45°N 82.46°E

Pali-Tanakhar
- Constituency No. 23 for the Chhattisgarh Legislative Assembly

Constituency details
- Country: India
- Region: Central India
- State: Chhattisgarh
- District: Korba
- Lok Sabha constituency: Korba
- Established: 1961
- Total electors: 228,459
- Reservation: ST

Member of Legislative Assembly
- 6th Chhattisgarh Legislative Assembly
- Incumbent Tuleshwar Hira Singh Markam
- Party: GGP
- Elected year: 2023
- Preceded by: Mohit Ram; INC

Pali-Tanakhar is one of the 90 Legislative Assembly constituencies of Chhattisgarh state in India. It is in Korba district and is reserved for candidates belonging to the Scheduled Tribes.

== Members of Legislative Assembly ==
Year	Member	Party
Madhya Pradesh Legislative Assembly
Before 1961: Constituency did not exist
1962	Yagyaseni Kumari	Indian National Congress
1967	L. Singh	Indian National Congress
1972	Lal Kirtikumar Singh	Indian National Congress
1977	Bishal Singh	Janata Party
1980	Lalkriti Kumar Singh	Indian National Congress (I)
1985	Hira Singh Markam	Bharatiya Janata Party
1990	Amol Singh Salam	Bharatiya Janata Party
1993	Bodhram	Indian National Congress
1998	Hira Singh Markam	Gondwana Ganatantra Party
Chhattisgarh Legislative Assembly
2003	Ram Dayal Uike	Indian National Congress
2008	Ram Dayal Uike	Indian National Congress
2013	Ram Dayal Uike	Indian National Congress
2018	Mohit Ram	Indian National Congress
2023	Tuleshwar Hira Singh Markam	Gondwana Ganatantra Party

== Election results ==
=== 2023 ===
Chhattisgarh Legislative Assembly Election, 2023: Pali-Tanakhar
Party	Candidate	Votes	%	±%
GGP	Tuleshwar Hira Singh Markam	60,862	32.87	−0.15
INC	Duleshwari Sidhar	60,148	32.48	−6.11
BJP	Ram Dayal Uike	46,522	25.12	+6.59
JCC	Chhatrapal Singh Kanwar	5,053	2.73	New
Independent	Chhavi Raj	3,927	2.12	New
NOTA	None of the Above	3,557	1.92	−1.03
Majority		714	0.39	−5.18
Turnout		185,163	81.05	−1.09
GGP gain from INC		Swing		

=== 2018 ===
Chhattisgarh Legislative Assembly Election, 2018: Pali-Tanakhar
Party	Candidate	Votes	%	±%
INC	Mohit Ram	66,971	38.59	
GGP	Tuleshwar Hira Singh Markam	57,315	33.02	
BJP	Ram Dayal Uike	32,155	18.53	
AAP	Sukhnandan Singh Puhup	3239	1.87	
Independent	Cresentia Kujur	2954	1.70	New
BSP	Tapeshwar Singh Maravi	2579	1.49	
API	Alwan Singh	2166	1.25	
NOTA	None of the Above	5,128	2.95	
Majority		9,656	5.57	
Turnout		173560	82.14	
INC hold		Swing		

== See also ==
- List of constituencies of the Chhattisgarh Legislative Assembly
- Korba district
- Dharamjaigarh
