= Savitri Thakur =

Indian politician

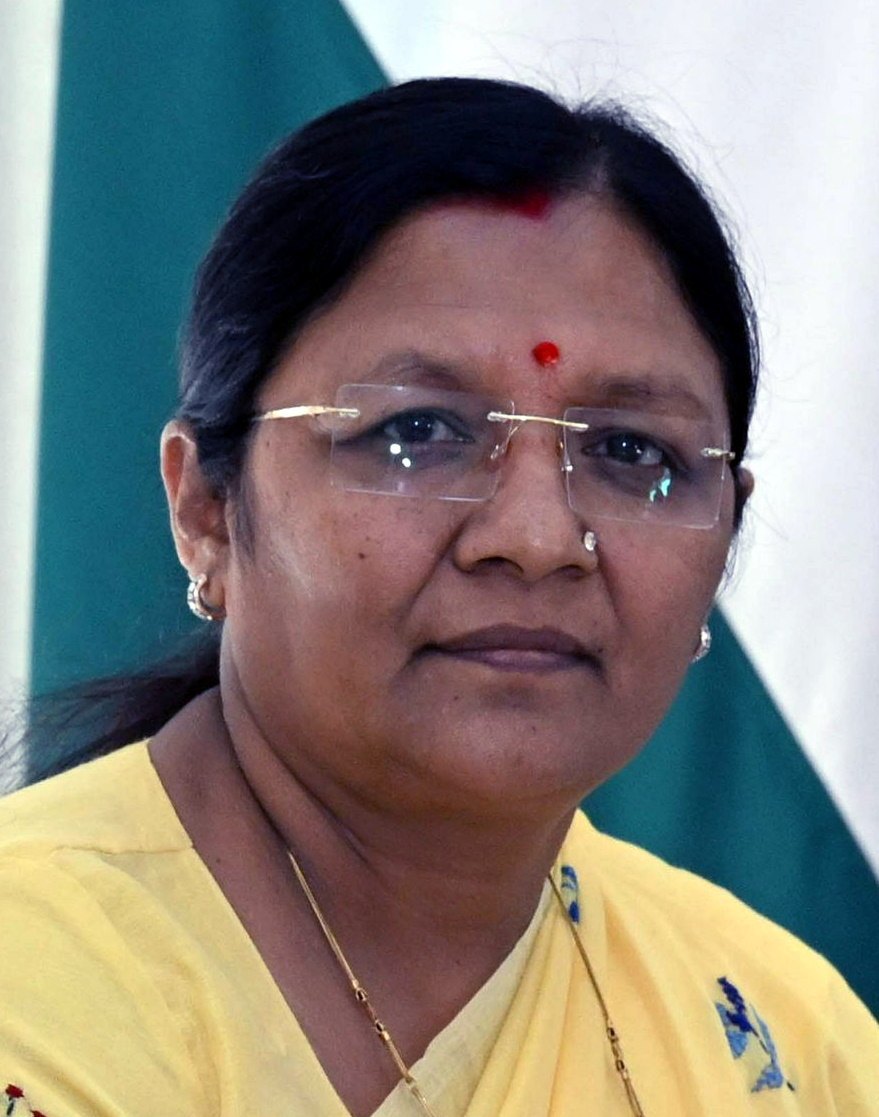

Minister of State for Women and Child Development
- Incumbent
- Assumed office 11 June 2024
- Prime Minister: Narendra Modi
- Minister: Annpurna Devi
- Preceded by: Mahendra Munjapara

Member of Parliament, Lok Sabha
- Incumbent
- Assumed office 4 June 2024
- Preceded by: Chattar Singh Darbar
- Constituency: Dhar
- In office 16 May 2014 – 23 May 2019
- Preceded by: Gajendra Singh Rajukhedi
- Succeeded by: Chhatar Singh Darbar
- Constituency: Dhar

Personal details
- Born: 1 June 1978 (age 48) Kalikiray, Dhar, Madhya Pradesh
- Party: Bharatiya Janata Party
- Spouse: Shri Tukaram Thakur
- Children: 2
- Occupation: Agriculturist
- As of 16 December, 2016

Savitri Thakur (Hindi pronunciation: [saːʋɪt̪ɾiː ʈʰaːkʊɾ]) is an Indian politician from Dhar who belongs to Bhartiya Janata Party (BJP). Savitri Thakur's educational qualification is 12th pass.

She contested 2014 Lok Sabha elections from Dhar seat in Madhya Pradesh.

Savtri Thakur was elected from Dhar in 2024 Indian general election.

== Controversies ==
School Chalo Abhiyan

In June 2024, during a visit to a government school in Dhar, Madhya Pradesh, Thakur was unable to write the slogan 'Beti Bachao, Beti Padhao' in Hindi, which raised questions pertaining to her educational qualifications and her competence as a Union Minister.

== See also ==
- Third Modi ministry
