= Gautam (clan) =

Clan in India

Gautam गौतम
- Ethnicity: Rajput
- Location: Uttar Pradesh; Bihar; Madhya Pradesh
- Language: Hindi; Bhojpuri
- Religion: Hindu

The Gautam is a Rajput clan found primarily in north region of Indian subcontinent. The erstwhile head of Gautam Rajputs had also claimed himself to be descendant of the Shakyas thus possibly giving an alternate origin for this clan.

They are primarily found in the Indian states of Uttar Pradesh, Bihar and Madhya Pradesh, along with Rajasthan and Gujarat.

The clan name Gautam means "descendant of Gautam or one who has most light", "Gautama" meaning "one who has the most light," and may indicate the possibility of Kshatriya clans adopting the Brahminical gotra of their purohit.

== Territory ==
The territory of key Gautam Rajput settlements included the following areas.

- Basti (near modern Siddharthnagar district)
- Azamgarh
- Fatehpur^{Note1}

== History ==
The Gautam Rajput clan was formerly very powerful near lower Doab. The Gautam Rajput family of Argal, fought several battles for Sher Shah against Humayun. The clan is divided into tribes: Raja, Rao (Birhampur), Rana [Chilli (Kanpur)], and Rawat (Bhaupur).

== Notable Gautam Rajputs ==
- Jodha Singh Ataiya
- Kedarnath Singh ^{Note2}
- Suryadeo Singh
- Balmukund Singh Gautam
- Janardan Singh Gautam

== Notes ==
Note1. The House of Aragal is in the Fatehpur district.
Note2. Kedarnath Singh calls himself a Gautam Rajput in his autobiography.
