= Sardarpur Assembly constituency =

Constituency of the Madhya Pradesh legislative assembly in India

Coordinates: 22.66°N 74.98°E

Sardarpur
- Constituency No. 196 for the Madhya Pradesh Legislative Assembly

Constituency details
- Country: India
- Region: Central India
- State: Madhya Pradesh
- District: Dhar
- Lok Sabha constituency: Dhar
- Established: 1972
- Reservation: ST

Member of Legislative Assembly
- 16th Madhya Pradesh Legislative Assembly
- Incumbent Pratap Grewal
- Party: Indian National Congress
- Elected year: 2023
- Preceded by: Welsingh Bhuriya

Sardarpur is one of the 230 Vidhan Sabha (Legislative Assembly) constituencies of Madhya Pradesh state in central India. It comprises Sardarpur tehsil in Dhar district and is reserved for members of the Scheduled tribes. As of 2023, it is represented by Pratap Grewal of the Indian National Congress party.

== Members of the Legislative Assembly ==
=== Madhya Bharat Legislative Assembly ===
Election	Member	Party
1952	Shankar Lal Garg	Indian National Congress

=== Madhya Pradesh Legislative Assembly ===
Election	Member	Party
1957	Shankarlal Garg	Indian National Congress
1962	Sumer Singh	Jana Sangh
1967	Babusingh Alawa	Bharatiya Jana Sangh
1972	Babusingh Alawa	Indian National Congress
1977	Mool Chand Patel	Indian National Congress
1980	Mool Chand Patel	Indian National Congress (Indira)
1985	Ganpat Singh Patel	Indian National Congress
1990	Ganpat Singh Patel	Indian National Congress
1993	Ganpat Singh Patel	Indian National Congress
1998	Ganpat Singh Patel	Indian National Congress
2003	Mukam Singh Nigwal	Bharatiya Janata Party
2008	Pratap Grewal	Indian National Congress
2013	Welsingh Bhuriya	Bharatiya Janata Party
2018	Pratap Grewal	Indian National Congress
2023	Pratap Grewal	Indian National Congress

== Election results ==
=== 2023 ===
2023 Madhya Pradesh Legislative Assembly election: Sardarpur
Party	Candidate	Votes	%	±%
INC	Pratap Grewal	86,114	49.35	−9.26
BJP	Welsingh Bhuriya	81,986	46.98	+10.38
Independent	Rajendra Tolaram - Gamad	2,940	1.68	
NOTA	None of the above	2,126	1.22	−0.78
Majority		4,128	2.37	−19.64
Turnout		174,508	77.35	−4.13
INC hold		Swing		

=== 2018 ===
2018 Madhya Pradesh Legislative Assembly election: Sardarpur
Party	Candidate	Votes	%	±%
INC	Pratap Grewal	96,419	58.61	
BJP	Sanjay Singh Baghel	60,214	36.6	
BSP	Mehtabsingh Dawar	1,659	1.01	
NOTA	None of the above	3,298	2.0	
Majority		36,205	22.01	
Turnout		164,501	81.48	
INC gain from BJP		Swing		

== See also ==
- Sardarpur
