= Badnawar Assembly constituency =

Constituency of the Madhya Pradesh legislative assembly in India

Coordinates: 23.02°N 75.24°E

Badnawar
- Constituency No. 202 for the Madhya Pradesh Legislative Assembly

Constituency details
- Country: India
- Region: Central India
- State: Madhya Pradesh
- District: Dhar
- Lok Sabha constituency: Dhar
- Established: 1957
- Reservation: None

Member of Legislative Assembly
- 16th Madhya Pradesh Legislative Assembly
- Incumbent Bhanwar Singh Shekhawat
- Party: Indian National Congress
- Elected year: 2023
- Preceded by: Rajvardhan Singh Dattigaon

Badnawar Assembly constituency is one of the 230 assembly constituencies of Madhya Pradesh a centre Indian state. Badnawar is also part of Dhar Lok Sabha constituency.

== Members of the Legislative Assembly ==
Election	Member	Party
1957	Manoharsingh Mehta	Indian National Congress
1962	Govardhan Sharma	Bharatiya Jan Sangh
1967	Govardhan Sharma	Bharatiya Jan Sangh
1972	Chiranjilal Alawa	Indian National Congress
1977	Govardhan Sharma	Janata Party
1980	Raghunath Singh	Indian National Congress (Indira)
1985	Ramesh Chandra Singh Rathore	Bharatiya Janata Party
1990	Prem Singh Daulat Singh	Indian National Congress
1993	Ramesh Chandra Singh Rathore	Bharatiya Janata Party
1998	Khemraj Patidar	Bharatiya Janata Party
2003	Rajvardhan Singh Dattigaon	Indian National Congress
2008	Rajvardhan Singh Dattigaon	Indian National Congress
2013	Bhanwar Singh Shekhawat	Bharatiya Janata Party
2018	Rajvardhan Singh Dattigaon	Indian National Congress
2020^	Rajvardhan Singh Dattigaon	Bharatiya Janata Party
2023	Bhanwar Singh Shekhawat	Indian National Congress

^ bypoll

== Election results ==
=== 2023 ===
2023 Madhya Pradesh Legislative Assembly election: Badnawar
Party	Candidate	Votes	%	±%
INC	Bhanwar Singh Shekhawat	93,733	49.79	−0.61
BJP	Rajvardhan Singh Dattigaon	90,757	48.21	+22.56
NOTA	None of the above	1,368	0.73	−0.85
Majority		2,976	1.58	−23.17
Turnout		188,245	85.45	−0.66
INC gain from BJP		Swing		

=== 2020 bypoll ===
2020 Madhya Pradesh Legislative Assembly by-elections: Badnawar
Party	Candidate	Votes	%	±%
BJP	Rajvardhan Singh Dattigaon	99,137	57.9	
INC	Kamalsing Patel	67,004	39.13	
BSP	Omparakash Malviya	2,295	1.34	
NOTA	None of the above	2,785	1.63	
Majority		32,133	18.77	
Turnout		171,221	83.85	
BJP gain from INC		Swing		

=== 2018 ===
2018 Madhya Pradesh Legislative Assembly election: Badnawar
Party	Candidate	Votes	%	±%
INC	Rajvardhan Singh Dattigaon	84,499	50.4	
BJP	Bhanwar Singh Shekhawat	42,993	25.65	
Independent	Rajesh Agrawal	30,976	18.48	
GGP	Vikram Solanki	2,605	1.55	
BSP	Samrath Kashyap Dharsikheda	2,099	1.25	
NOTA	None of the above	2,656	1.58	
Majority		41,506	24.75	
Turnout		167,645	86.11	
INC gain from		Swing		

== See also ==
- Badnawar
- Dhar district
- Dhar (Lok Sabha constituency)
