= Bharat Singh Chowhan =

Indian politician

Member of Parliament, Lok Sabha
- In office 1962-1980
- Constituency: Dhar, Madhya Pradesh

Personal details
- Born: 12 October 1912 Bhawaniya Bujurg Village, Dhar District, British India (now Madhya Pradesh, India)
- Party: Janata Party
- Other political affiliations: Bharatiya Jana Sangh
- Spouse: Kumudini Chowhan
- Children: Daughter Smt. Mukta Dilip Mungi, Sons Harsh Chowhan, Anand Chowhan

Bharat Singh Chowhan is an Indian politician. He was elected to the lower House of Parliament the Lok Sabha from Dhar, Madhya Pradesh, India.
