= Birendranagar Assembly constituency =

Constituency of the Chhattisgarh legislative assembly in India

Birendranagar
- Former constituency for the Chhattisgarh Legislative Assembly

Constituency details
- Country: India
- Region: Central India
- State: Chhattisgarh
- Established: 2003
- Abolished: 2008
- Total electors: 144,197

Birendranagar Assembly constituency was an assembly constituency in the India state of Chhattisgarh.

== Members of the Legislative Assembly ==
Election	Member	Party
2003	Akabar Bhai	Indian National Congress

== Election results ==
=== Assembly Election 2003 ===
2003 Chhattisgarh Legislative Assembly election : Birendranagar
Party	Candidate	Votes	%	±%
INC	Akabar Bhai	54,828	49.85%	New
BJP	Santosh Pandey	42,846	38.95%	New
GGP	Sumran Singh Dhruwey	5,912	5.37%	New
Independent	Santlal Dhurwey	3,216	2.92%	New
NCP	Nathoo Ram Sahu	3,191	2.90%	New
Margin of victory		11,982	10.89%	
Turnout		109,993	76.29%	
Registered electors		144,197		
INC win (new seat)				
