= Dharmapuri Assembly constituency =

Dharmapuri Assembly constituency may refer to:

- Dharmapuri, Tamil Nadu Assembly constituency
- Dharmapuri, Telangana Assembly constituency
- Dharampuri Assembly constituency in Madhya Pradesh
