= Tornod =

Village in Madhya Pradesh, India

Tornod is a village in Dhar district, Madhya Pradesh, India Tornod is situated near State Highway 31.
