= Pratap Grewal =

Indian politician (born 1967)

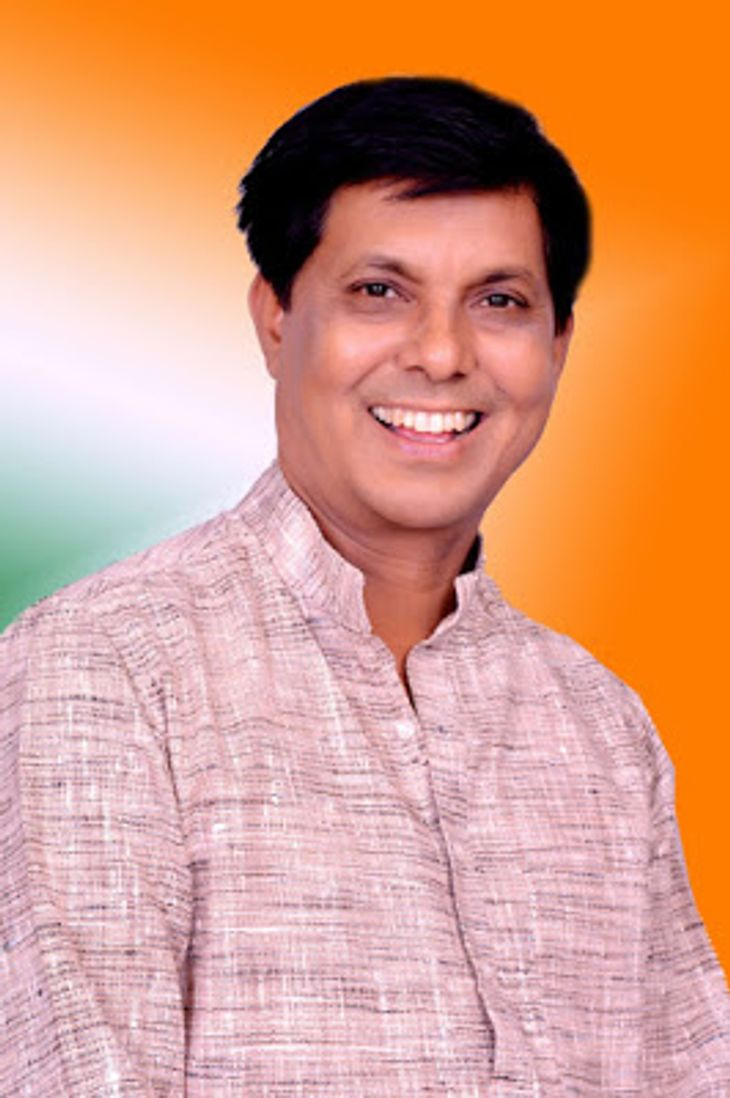

Member of the Madhya Pradesh Legislative Assembly
- Constituency: Sardarpur

Pratap Grewal (born 1967) is an Indian politician from Madhya Pradesh. He is a three time MLA from Sardarpur Assembly constituency, which is reserved for Scheduled Tribe community, in Dhar District. He won the 2023 Madhya Pradesh Legislative Assembly election, representing the Indian National Congress.

== Early life and education ==
Grewal is from Sardarpur, Dhar District, Madhya Pradesh. He is the son of Champalal Grewal. He completed his L.L.B. in 1995 at Government College, Dhar, which is affiliated with Vikram University, Ujjain. His wife is in government service.

== Career ==
Grewal won from Sardarpur Assembly constituency in the 2023 Madhya Pradesh Legislative Assembly election representing the Indian National Congress. He polled 86,114 votes and defeated his nearest rival, Wel Singh Bhuriya of the Bharatiya Janata Party, by a margin of 4,128 votes. He first became an MLA winning the 2008 Madhya Pradesh Legislative Assembly election defeating Mukam Singh Nigwal of the BJP by a margin of 23,221 votes. He lost the next election in 2013 to Bhuriya by a narrow margin of 529 votes but regained the seat for the Indian National Congress in the 2018 Assembly election. In 2018, he defeated Sanjay Singh Baghel of the BJP by a margin of 36,205 votes.
