= Tirla =

- village
- Location in Madhya Pradesh, India
- Coordinates: 22.34°N 75.14°E
- Country: India
- State: Madhya Pradesh
- District: Dhar
- Elevation: 506 m (1,660 ft)

Languages
  - Official: Hindi
- Time zone: UTC+5:30 (IST)
- PIN: 454129
- Telephone code: 07292
- Vehicle registration: MP 11 XX XXXX
- Website: www.shriambikaadarsh.org%0afootnotes=

Tirla is a village in Dhar district in the state of Madhya Pradesh, central India. It is located about 6 km west of Dhar. Tirla is located at 22.34°N 75.14°E.

== External links and Sources ==
- Imperial Gazetter on Dictionary of Southern Asia - Bhopawar Agency
