= Surendra Singh Baghel =

Indian politician

Member of the Madhya Pradesh Legislative Assembly
- Incumbent
- Assumed office 2013
- Preceded by: Mukam Singh Kirade
- Constituency: Kukshi

Minister of Tourism and narmada valley development, Government of Madhya Pradesh
- In office 25 December 2018 – April 2020
- Chief Minister: Kamal Nath
- Succeeded by: Usha Thakur

Personal details
- Born: 17 March 1977 (age 49) Vadodara, Gujarat, India
- Party: Indian National Congress
- Education: Daly College; Barkatullah University
- Profession: Agriculturist politician businessman
- As of 26 January, 2014

Surendra Singh Baghel also known as Honey Baghel (born 17 March 1977) was the Minister of Tourism Department and Narmada Valley Development Department of Madhya Pradesh but resigned due to political turmoil, and also the Member of Legislative Assembly from Kukshi constituency of Madhya Pradesh.

== Political career ==
He was parliamentary Vice president of Indian Youth Congress of Dhar-Mhow parliamentary constituency. His father Pratap Singh Baghel also contested Assembly elections unsuccessfully on BJP ticket from Kukshi in 2008.

He is dedicated for key issues like tribal empowerment, quality health facilities, quality education, quality sports facilities for tribals and last but not the least women empowerment.

In the year 2013 he won assembly elections from Kukshi constituency of Madhya Pradesh.

== Early life and education ==
Baghel was born in Vadodara, Gujarat on 17 March 1977, the eldest child of renowned politician of Madhya Pradesh Pratap Singh Baghel, former minister in the Government of Madhya Pradesh. He studied at Daly College, Indore before graduating in Barkatullah University in 2001.

== Politics ==
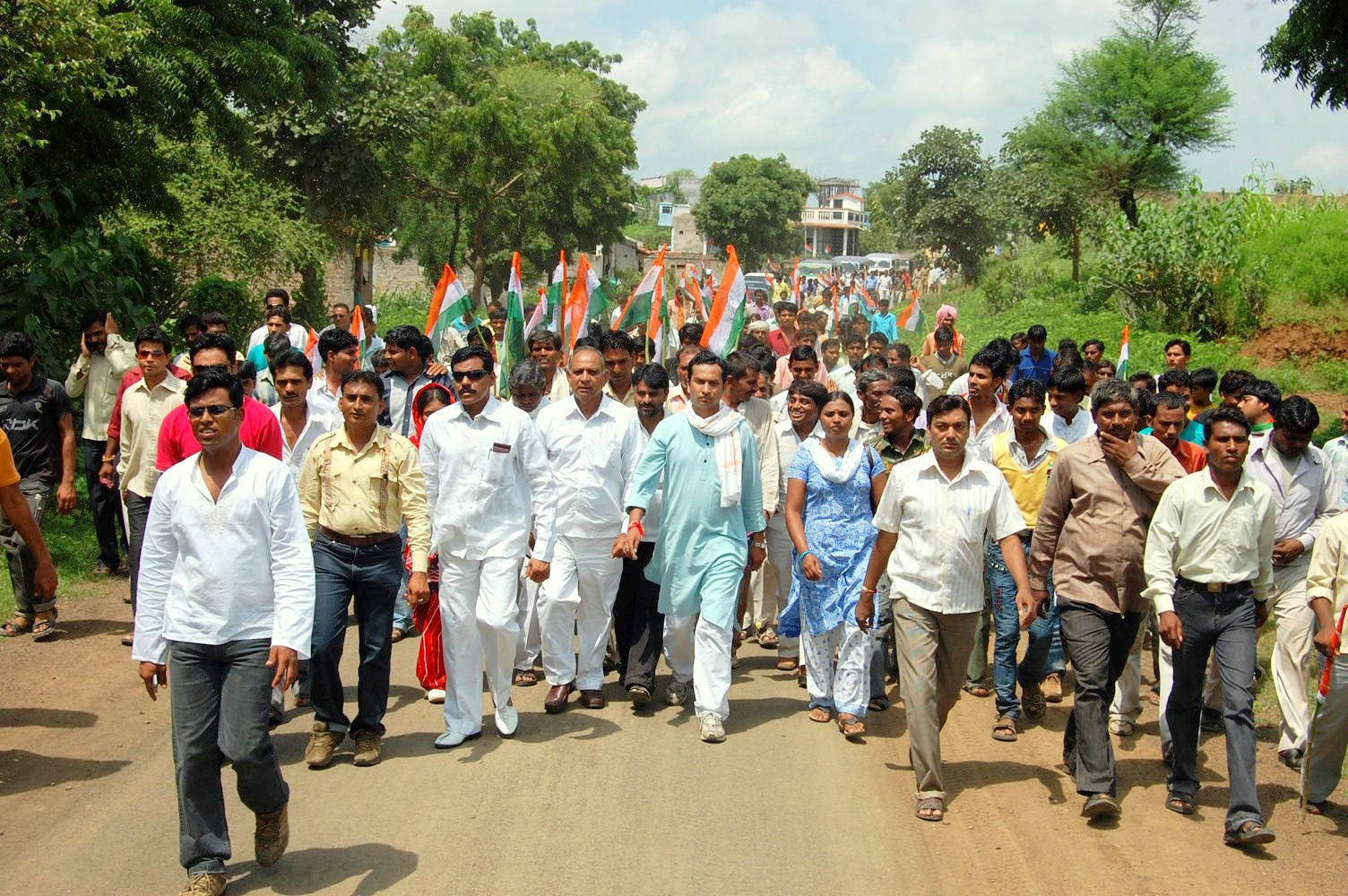
Surendra Singh Baghel leading footmarch.

In 2008, he was appointed President of Dhar youth Congress committee of Madhya Pradesh. During his tenure as youth Congress president, he launched many awareness campaigns among tribals of district for their empowerment and from year 2008 to 2013, he organised many footmarches in Kukshi constituency against irrelevant policies of BJP led government of Madhya Pradesh.

In 2013, Congress leadership allotted him party ticket to contest Assembly elections and he defeated sitting MLA of BJP Mukam Singh Kirade (husband of former minister Mrs. Ranjana Baghel) with humongous margin of 42,768 votes. In second election of baghel he won by 62930 votes in 2018
