= Tuleshwar Hira Singh Markam =

Indian politician

Tuleshwar Hira Singh Markam (born 1973) is an Indian politician from Chhattisgarh. He is a member of the Chhattisgarh Legislative Assembly from Pali Tanakhar Assembly constituency, which is reserved for Scheduled Tribes community, in Korba district. He won the 2023 Chhattisgarh Legislative Assembly election representing the Gondwana Gantantra Party.

== Early life and education ==
Tuleshwar is from Katghora, Korba district, Chhattisgarh. His late father, Hira Singh Markam, was an MLA from the Pali-Tanakhar Assembly constituency. He completed his graduation in arts in 1998 and later, did his LLB in 2001, at Guru Ghasidas University, Bilaspur.

== Career ==
Tuleshwar was elected as an MLA for the first time from Pali Tanakhar Assembly constituency representing the Gondwana Gantantra Party in the 2023 Chhattisgarh Legislative Assembly election. He polled 60,862 votes and defeated his nearest rival, Duleshwari Sidar of the Indian National Congress, by a narrow margin of 714 votes. He first contested the 2018 Chhattisgarh Legislative Assembly election from Pali Tanakhar seat on Gondwana Gantantra ticket, but lost to Mohit Ram of the Indian National Congress by a margin of 9,656 votes. He polled 57,315 votes against 66,971 votes for winner Mohit Ram.
