= Dahi, Madhya Pradesh =

Town in Madhya Pradesh

Dahi
- Town
- Country: India
- State: Madhya Pradesh

Government
  - Type: Nagar Panchayat

Population (2011)
  - Total: 8,509

Languages
  - Official: Hindi
- Time zone: UTC+5:30 (IST)
- ISO 3166 code: IN-MP
- Vehicle registration: MP 11

Dahi (डही) is a town and Nagar Panchayat located in Dhar District of Madhya Pradesh, India.

== Geography ==
Dahi is located at 22.11°N 74.58°E. It has an average elevation of 506 metres (1,660 feet).

== Description ==
=== Population ===
The Dahi Nagar Panchayat has a population of 8,509, of which 4,271 are male and 4,238 are female as per the 2011 census of India.

=== Administration ===
Dahi is a Tehsil headquarter and a Development Block in Dhar District. There are a total of 61 villages in this tehsil.

=== Civil Administration ===
Dahi is a Nagar Panchayat city. It is divided into 15 wards for which elections are held every 5 years.

=== Dahi Population Religion Data ===
Religion - Percentage -	Hindu - 83.81%	Muslim - 15.56%	Christian - 0.20%	Sikh - 0.01%	Buddhist - 0.00%	Jain - 0.09%	Others - 0.05%	No Religion - 0.28%
