= Kadod Kala =

Karod Kalan (Kadod Kala)
- Village
- Location in Madhya Pradesh, India
- Coordinates: 22.782401°N 75.214387°E
- Country: India
- State: Madhya Pradesh
- District: Dhar

Government
  - Type: Democratic
  - Body: Gram Panchayat
- Elevation: 522 m (1,713 ft)

Population (2011)
  - Total: 4,528

Languages
  - Official: Hindi
  - Communication: Malvi
- Time zone: UTC+5:30 (IST)
- PIN: 454665
- Telephone code: 07295
- Website: facebook.com/kadodkala

Karod Kala (Kadod Kala) is a village and a Gram panchayat in Badnawar tehsil of the Dhar district in the state of Madhya Pradesh, India.
