= Rajvardhan Singh Dattigaon =

Indian politician (born 1972)

Member of the Madhya Pradesh Legislative Assembly
- In office 2018–2023
- Preceded by: Bhanwar Singh Shekhawat
- Succeeded by: Bhanwar Singh Shekhawat
- Constituency: Badnawar
- In office 2003–2013
- Preceded by: Khemraj Patidar
- Constituency: Badnawar

Personal details
- Born: 10 January 1972 (age 54)
- Party: Bharatiya Janta Party
- Parent: Prem Singh Dattigaon (father)
- Education: Post Graduate
- Profession: Agriculture
- As of 23 Oct, 2018 Source: ["Biography:Dattigaon, Rajvardhan Singh" (PDF). Madhya Pradesh Legislative Assembly.]

Rajvardhan Singh Dattigaon is an Indian politician and a member of Bharatiya Janata Party. He was cabinet minister in Shivraj Singh's government and held Industry Policy and Investment Promotion portfolio. He is a descendant of Amjhera estate and is a titular head of the Dattigaon Jagir. He is also known as Maharaja or Rao Saheb of Dattigaon. He represents Badnawar in the state legislative assembly which comes under Dhar district of Madhya Pradesh and is a four-time MLA.

== Early life and education ==
Rajvardhan was born on 10 January 1972 at Jaipur to Prem Singh and Kusum Kumari. His father was a politician and an MLA. He did his schooling from Mayo College, Ajmer and then went to pursue BA from St. Stephens College in Delhi. He did his post-graduation from Indian Institute of Mass Communication in Advertising and Public Relations.

== Political career ==
After his education, he joined Lufthansa as a marketing manager but left the job to contest his first election as an independent candidate. As per his statement in the media, he did so to avenge the insult to his father, who was denied ticket by the Congress party in 1998. Thereafter, he joined Congress and was appointed General Secretary of Madhya Pradesh Youth Congress. He was first elected to Madhya Pradesh Assembly in 2003, secondly in 2008 and thirdly in 2018. However, he soon resigned as he was denied a ministerial berth.

In mid-2018, he was appointed a member of election campaign committee and Vice President in state Congress unit. In order to oversee the efforts of party for 2018 assembly election, he was made in-charge of Ujjain division too. In 2014, Congress President Sonia Gandhi gave him the charge of Chhattisgarh.

During 2020 Madhya Pradesh political crisis, he supported Jyotiraditya Scindia and was one of the 22 MLAs who resigned. Thereafter, he joined Bharatiya Janata party. He took oath as a Cabinet Minister on July 14, 2020 and was assigned the responsibility of Industry Policy and Investment Promotion.
