= Dhar Assembly constituency =

Constituency of the Madhya Pradesh legislative assembly in India

Coordinates: 22.60°N 75.31°E

Dhar
- Constituency No. 201 for the Madhya Pradesh Legislative Assembly

Constituency details
- Country: India
- Region: Central India
- State: Madhya Pradesh
- District: Dhar
- Lok Sabha constituency: Dhar
- Established: 1972
- Reservation: None

Member of Legislative Assembly
- 16th Madhya Pradesh Legislative Assembly
- Incumbent Neena Vikram Verma
- Party: Bharatiya Janata Party
- Elected year: 2023
- Preceded by: Jaswant Singh Rathore

Dhar is one of the 230 Vidhan Sabha (Legislative Assembly) constituencies of Madhya Pradesh state in central India.

It is part of Dhar district.

== Members of the Legislative Assembly ==
Election	Name	Party
1957	Vasntrao Pradhan	Akhil Bharatiya Hindu Mahasabha
1962	Kanhiyalal	Indian National Congress
1967	Vasntrao Pradhan	Bharatiya Jana Sangh
1972	Surendrasingh Gangasingh	Indian National Congress
1977	Vikram Verma	Janata Party
1980	Vikram Verma	Bharatiya Janata Party
1985	Mohansingh Bundela	Indian National Congress
1990	Vikram Verma	Bharatiya Janata Party
1993	Vikram Verma	Bharatiya Janata Party
1998	Karansingh Pawar	Indian National Congress
2003	Jaswant Singh Rathore	Bharatiya Janata Party
2008	Balmukund Goutam	Bharatiya Janata Party
2013	Balmukund Goutam	Bharatiya Janata Party
2018	Balmukund Goutam	Bharatiya Janata Party
2023	Balmukund Goutam	Bharatiya Janata Party

== Election results ==
=== 2023 ===
2023 Madhya Pradesh Legislative Assembly election: Dhar
Party	Candidate	Votes	%	±%
BJP	Neena Vikram Verma	90,371	44.08	−5.39
INC	Prabha Balmukund Gautam	80,677	39.35	−7.08
Independent	Rajeev Yadav-Raju	21,114	10.3	
Independent	Kuldeep Mohan singh bundela	6,948	3.39	
NOTA	None of the above	1,198	0.58	−0.28
Majority		9,694	4.73	+1.69
Turnout		205,033	79.5	+5.96
BJP hold		Swing		

=== 2018 ===
2018 Madhya Pradesh Legislative Assembly election: Dhar
Party	Candidate	Votes	%	±%
BJP	Neena Vikram Verma	93,180	49.47	
INC	Prabha Balmukundsingh Goutam	87,462	46.43	
NOTA	None of the above	1,615	0.86	
Majority		5,718	3.04	
Turnout		188,357	73.54	
BJP hold		Swing		

== Prior results ==
2018 Neena Vikram Verma BJP Winner 93,180 49% 5,718 Prabha Balmukundsingh Goutam INC Runner Up 87,462 46%

2013 Neena Vikram Verma BJP Winner 85,624 50% 11,482 Kunw. Balmukund Singh Gautam INC Runner Up 74,142 43%

2008 Balmukund Singh Goutam INC Winner 50,510 47% Neena Vikram Verma BJP Runner Up 50,509 47% 1

2003 Jaswant Singh Rathore (advocate) BJP Winner 80,732 56% 29,851 Karan Singh Pawar INC Runner Up 50,881 35%

1998 Karansingh Pawar INC Winner 53,862 49% 147 Vikram Verma BJP Runner Up 53,715 49%

1993 Vikram Verma BJP Winner 42,514 44% 14,713 Karan Singh Panwar INC Runner Up 36,058 38%

1990 Vikram Verma BJP Winner 50,294 57% 15,506 Mohan Singh Bundela INC Runner Up 34,788 39%

1985 Mohansingh Bundela INC Winner 36,844 57% 11,882 Vikram Verma BJP Runner Up 24,962 39%

1980 Vikaram Varma BJP Winner 24,112 49% 3,450 Surendra Singh Neemkhera INC(I) Runner Up 20,662 42%

1977 Vikram Verma JNP Winner 28,176 67% 15,780 Surendrasingh Neemkheda INC Runner Up 12,396 29%

== See also ==
- Dhar
