= 1991 Indian general election in Madhya Pradesh =

General Election in Madhya Pradesh

Indian general election in Madhya Pradesh, 1991
- May 1991

40 seats
	First party	Second party
	INC	BJP
Party	INC	BJP
Seats before	8	27
Seats won	27	12
Seat change	▲19	▼15
Prime Minister before election
Chandra Shekhar
SJP(R)
Prime Minister after election
P. V. Narasimha Rao
INC

In the 1991 Indian general election for Madhya Pradesh polls were held for 40 seats in the state. The result was a major victory for the Indian National Congress (INC) which won 12 seats. Bharatiya Janata Party (BJP) fared poorly in this election and managed to won only 8 seats.

== Parties and alliances ==
=== Bharatiya Janata Party ===
Party	Flag	Symbol	Leader	Seats contested
Bharatiya Janata Party			L. K. Advani	40

=== Indian National Congress ===
Party	Flag	Symbol	Leader	Seats contested
Indian National Congress			Madhavrao Scindia	40

=== Others ===
Party	flag	Symbol	Leader	Seats contested
Janata Dal			Vishwanath Pratap Singh	37
Bahujan Samaj Party			Kanshi Ram	21

== Result ==
=== Results by Party ===
Party Name	Popular vote			Seats		
Party Name	Votes	%	±pp	Contested	Won	+/−
INC	74,25,644	45.34		40	27	
BJP	68,59,335	41.88		40	12	
JD	6,95,158	4.24		37	0	
BSP	5,80,030	3.54		21	1	
JP	1,00,897	0.62		33	0	
CPI	69,161	0.42		3	0	
Others	1,07,033	0.67	Steady	71	0	Steady
IND	5,41,209	3.30		438	0	Steady
Total	1,63,78,467	100%	-	683	40	-

=== Constituency wise ===
Constituency		Winner				Runner Up				Margin	%
#	Name	Candidate	Party	Votes	%	Candidate	Party	Votes	%	Margin	%
1	Morena (SC)	Barelal Jatav	INC	116,227	35.89	Chhaviram Argal	BJP	99,482	30.72	16,745	5.17
2	Bhind	Yoganand Saraswati	BJP	142,185	35.88	Udayan Sharma	INC	103,331	26.07	38,854	9.81
3	Gwalior	Madhav Rao Scindia	INC	195,212	53.37	Shejwalkar N. K.	BJP	96,156	26.29	99,056	27.08
4	Guna	Vijaya Raje Scindia	BJP	188,773	51.43	Shashi Bhooshan	INC	133,721	36.43	55,052	15.00
5	Sagar (SC)	Anand Ahirwar	INC	178,478	48.18	Ram Prasad Ahirwar	BJP	169,130	45.65	9,348	2.53
6	Khajuraho	Uma Bharti	BJP	251,714	49.95	Ramratan	INC	186,731	37.05	64,983	12.90
7	Damoh	Ramkrishna Kusmaria	BJP	198,708	46.73	Dal Chandra Jain	INC	182,550	42.93	16,158	3.80
8	Satna	Arjun Singh	INC	205,905	43.34	Sukhendra Singh	BJP	139,654	29.40	66,251	13.94
9	Rewa	Bheem Singh Patel	BSP	145,373	32.79	Shriniwas Tiwari	INC	131,057	29.56	14,316	3.23
10	Sidhi (ST)	Motilal Singh	INC	162,892	46.00	Jagannath Singh	BJP	131,268	37.07	31,624	8.93
11	Shahdol (ST)	Dalbir Singh	INC	155,002	47.68	Hemvant Porte	BJP	111,706	34.36	43,296	13.32
12	Surguja (ST)	Khelsai Singh	INC	169,908	51.90	Larang Sai	BJP	122,916	37.55	46,992	14.35
13	Raigarh (ST)	Pushpadevi Singh	INC	194,080	53.13	Nand Kumar Sai	BJP	138,266	37.85	55,814	15.28
14	Janjgir	Bhawani Lal Verma	INC	159,573	41.91	Kunwar Dilip Singh Judeo	BJP	130,148	34.19	29,425	7.72
15	Bilaspur (SC)	Khelan Ram Jangde	INC	175,642	53.24	Govind Ram Miri	BJP	137,681	41.73	37,961	11.51
16	Sarangarh (SC)	Paras Ram Bharadwaj	INC	149,987	42.17	Resham Lal Jangde	BJP	104,975	29.51	45,012	12.66
17	Raipur	Vidyacharan Shukla	INC	188,335	45.09	Ramesh Bais	BJP	187,376	44.86	959	0.23
18	Mahasamund	Pawan Diwan	INC	205,362	48.86	Chandrashekar Sahu	BJP	183,883	43.75	21,479	5.11
19	Kanker (ST)	Arvind Netam	INC	154,567	49.86	Deolall Dugga	BJP	135,206	43.62	19,361	6.24
20	Bastar (ST)	Mankuram Sodhi	INC	87,993	44.87	Rajaram Todem	BJP	70,973	36.19	17,020	8.68
21	Durg	Chandulal Chandrakar	INC	270,506	49.47	Manarakhan Lal Sahu	BJP	182,767	33.42	87,739	16.05
22	Rajnandgaon	Shivendra Bahadur Singh	INC	178,132	46.83	Dharampal Singh Gupta	BJP	130,722	34.36	47,410	12.47
23	Balaghat	Vishveshwar Bhagat	INC	185,491	40.82	Gourishankar Chaturbhuj	BJP	129,265	28.45	56,226	12.37
24	Mandla (ST)	Mohan Lal	INC	165,607	63.26	Ram Bhajan	BJP	77,934	29.77	87,673	33.49
25	Jabalpur	Shrawan Kumar Patel	INC	172,149	44.20	Baburao Paranjpe	BJP	165,427	42.47	6,722	1.73
26	Seoni	Vimla Verma	INC	221,896	54.66	Prahlad Singh Patel	BJP	166,338	40.98	55,558	13.68
27	Chhindwara	Kamal Nath	INC	214,456	55.98	Choudhari Chanderbhan	BJP	134,824	35.19	79,632	20.79
28	Betul	Aslam-Sher-Khan	INC	153,756	51.69	Arif Baig	BJP	131,023	44.05	22,733	7.64
29	Hoshangabad	Sartaj Singh	BJP	206,157	47.81	Rameshwar Nikhra	INC	197,703	45.85	8,454	1.96
30	Bhopal	Sushil Chandra Verma	BJP	308,946	53.61	Mansoor Ali Khan Patodi	INC	206,738	35.88	102,208	17.73
31	Vidisha	Atal Bihari Vajpayee	BJP	279,232	58.81	Pratap Bhanu Sharma	INC	175,098	36.88	104,134	21.93
32	Rajgarh	Digvijay Singh	INC	219,736	48.60	Pyarelal Khandelwal	BJP	218,266	48.27	1,470	0.33
33	Shajapur (SC)	Phoolchand Verma	BJP	265,553	56.79	Bapulal Malviya	INC	187,305	40.06	78,248	16.73
34	Khandwa	Mahender Kumar Singh	INC	230,142	49.74	Amritlal Tarawala	BJP	213,367	46.11	16,775	3.63
35	Khargone	Rameshwar Patidar	BJP	220,679	49.50	Subhash Yadav	INC	206,884	46.41	13,795	3.09
36	Dhar (ST)	Surajbhanu Solanki	INC	243,385	52.72	Dhirendrasingh Chouhan	BJP	203,906	44.17	39,479	8.55
37	Indore	Sumitra Mahajan	BJP	303,269	54.88	Lalit Jain	INC	222,675	40.30	80,594	14.58
38	Ujjain (SC)	Satyanarayan Jatiya	BJP	238,904	54.40	Sajjansingh Verma	INC	187,184	42.63	51,720	11.77
39	Jhabua (ST)	Dileepsingh Bhuria	INC	249,304	62.72	Relam Chauhan	BJP	114,902	28.91	134,402	33.81
40	Mandsaur	Laxminarain Pandey	BJP	307,927	47.78	Mahendra Singh	INC	300,944	46.69	6,983	1.09

== Post-election Union Council of Ministers from Madhya Pradesh ==
SI No.	Name	Constituency	Designation	Department	From	To	Party
1	Arjun Singh	Satna	Cabinet Minister	Human Resource Development	21 June 1991	24 December 1994	INC
2	Madhavrao Scindia	Gwalior	Cabinet Minister	Civil Aviation and Tourism	21 June 1991	9 January 1993	INC
2	Madhavrao Scindia	Gwalior	Cabinet Minister	Human Resource Development	10 February 1995	17 January 1996	INC
3	Vidya Charan Shukla	Raipur	Cabinet Minister	Water Resources	21 June 1991	17 January 1996	INC
4	Kamal Nath	Chhindwara	Minister of State (Independent Charge)	Environment and Forests	21 June 1991	15 September 1995	INC
4	Kamal Nath	Chhindwara	Minister of State (Independent Charge)	Textiles	15 September 1995	20 February 1996	INC
5	Arvind Netam	Kanker (ST)	Minister of State	Agriculture	18 January 1993	20 February 1996	INC
6	Aslam Sher Khan	Betul	Minister of State	Prime Minister’s Office	15 September 1995	16 May 1995	INC
6	Aslam Sher Khan	Betul	Minister of State	Welfare	15 September 1995	16 May 1995	INC
7	Vimla Verma	Seoni	Minister of State	Welfare (Women and Child Development)	15 September 1995	16 May 1996	INC
