= Gajendra Singh Rajukhedi =

Indian politician

Member of Parliament, 15th Lok Sabha
- In office 2009–2014
- Preceded by: Chhatar Singh Darbar
- Succeeded by: Savitri Thakur
- Constituency: Dhar
- In office 1998–2004
- Preceded by: Chhatar Singh Darbar
- Succeeded by: Chhatar Singh Darbar
- Constituency: Dhar

Personal details
- Born: 11 December 1964 (age 61) Rajukhedi, Dhar
- Party: Bharatiya Janata Party (2024- Present)
- Other political affiliations: Indian National Congress (till 2024)
- Spouse: Gayatri Singh (m. 1990)
- Children: 2 daughters and 2 sons
- Parents: Onkar Singh (father); Ramkunwar Devi (mother)
- Education: B.A. LLB
- Alma mater: Devi Ahilya University
- Profession: Politician, Advocate
- As of 9 July, 2012 Source: []

Gajendra Singh Rajukhedi (born 11 December 1964 in Village Rajukhedi, Dhar district) is an Indian politician, belonging to Indian National Congress. In the 2009 election he was elected to the 15th Lok Sabha from the Dhar Lok Sabha constituency of Madhya Pradesh.

He was also member of 12th and 13th Lok Sabha from Dhar.

He is an Advocate and resides at Dhar. He is married to Mrs Gayatri Singh and they have two daughters and two sons. Their youngest son is Revti Raman Rajukhedi. He is a law student.
