= Hira Singh Markam =

Indian politician (1942–2020)

President of the Gondwana Ganatantra Party
- In office 13 January 1991 – 28 October 2020
- Preceded by: position established
- Succeeded by: Tuleshwar Singh Markam

Member of the Chhattisgarh and Madhya Pradesh Legislative Assemblies (Note: The Chhattisgarh Legislative Assembly was formed in 2000 from 90 constituencies of the Madhya Pradesh Legislative Assembly, when the state was split.)
- In office 1998–2003
- Preceded by: Bodhram
- Succeeded by: Ram Dayal Uikey
- In office 1985–1990
- Preceded by: Lalkriti Kumar Singh
- Succeeded by: Amol Singh Salam
- Constituency: Pali-Tanakhar

Personal details
- Born: 14 January 1942 Tiwarta, Bilaspur (now Korba District)
- Died: 28 October 2020 (aged 78) Bilaspur, Chhattisgarh, India
- Citizenship: Indian
- Party: Gondwana Ganatantra Party
- Spouse: Ram Kunwar Markam (m. 1958)
- Children: 3
- Occupation: Politician

Hira Singh Markam (14 January 1942 – 28 October 2020) was an Indian politician who founded Gondwana Ganatantra Party, a regional political party based in Chhattisgarh. He has served as the member of Madhya Pradesh Legislative Assembly from Pali-Tanakhar since 1998 to 2003.

== Early life and education ==
Hira Singh Markam was born on 14 January 1942 as the youngest of four brothers into a farmer's family of Dev Shay Markam and Sonkunwar Markam at Tiwarta village of Bilaspur district, Madhya Pradesh (now in Korba district, Chhattisgarh).

Three brothers and four sisters among them. Name of elder brother Charan Singh Markam, Heera Singh Markam and younger brother Nirmal Singh Markam. Hira Singh Markam was married in the year 1958 and the wife's name is Mrs. Ram Kunwar Markam, who is not educated, nor has she ever tried to read till date. He has three children. The eldest daughter is Geeta Markam who now writes Dimension [husband's surname]. The eldest son's name is Tuleshwar Markam and the younger son's name is Liladhar Markam. All the children are married and all are successfully performing their tasks. All are living happy lives.

=== Education ===
Hira Singh Markam did his primary education in the village itself. Because there was no government or private school in the village. An educated person used to give primary education to some children of the village. Instead, they used to give them rice every day. Master Sahib, who taught him from the first to the third grade, was the first minister in the village zamindar, who was made a teacher by the villagers. Then three years later a government school was formed in the village. Where hira Singh Markam enrolled in fourth grade. From there, he got education in Hindi, Geography, Mathematics and Grammar composition and thus he completed primary school from the village. There was no secondary school around the village of Hira Singh Markam. There used to be only schools of Janpad Panchayat. Therefore, in 1952, he enrolled in a secondary school in Suri village, about 40 km from his village. Since there was no government hostel, all the arrangements had to be made by themselves. Pulses, rice, oil, spices and bedding all had to be taken from home. The school used to run in a zamindar's old mansion. After completing my studies from Suri to seventh grade, I went to the Katghora Tehsil Headquarters for a year, from where I passed the eighth grade in the year 1955-56 from an institution called Shiksha Vikas Samiti. As there was no high school at the Tehsil headquarters, he remained seated at home for a year. After that, he passed the examination for admission to Basic Teachers Training School and then did a one-year course, which passed the examination in 1957-58. After this, they started trying for jobs. He sat idle for 14 months after training. Finally on 2 August 1960, he was appointed as a teacher in the Primary School.

== Political career ==
In the year 1960, Hira Singh Markam got a job in the village ralia for the post of government teacher. Then he passed the Higher Secondary School examination from Bhopal as a 1964 private student. Then he continued to work till the year 1977 as a primary school teacher at Pondi Upora, 12 km from Katghora tahsil. When he was transferred from Pondi Uproora, he was a V teacher in another school for 4 months. Then he got his transfer done in July 1978 in his village Tiwarta Primary School. While he was in Upora, Usain got his B.A. from there. Completed the first year and then came to the village and passed the examination of second year and third year in the year 1979 and 1980 respectively. Now he was graduated. He was M.A. from Pandit Ravi Shankar Shukla University Raipur. He did his LLB in the year 1984 from Guru Ghasidas University, Bilaspur. In which he got the us Gold Medal. It was 1980 when I was working as a teacher in a government school in my village. Many teachers were then being harassed in the name of transfer-posting. Demotion of senior teachers was also being done. I raised my voice against the injustice and oppression on the teachers and opened a front against Kunwar Balwan Singh, the Basic Education Officer of the district. I had become recognized as a militant teacher leader. Assembly elections were underway at the same time. Since I was socially and educationally aware, I wanted to solve the problems of the society on a large scale and this showed me a golden opportunity when I could help the society and people in a good way. Then I resigned from government service on April 2, 1980 and jumped into the election from Pali-Tanakhar assembly constituency. Despite being an independent candidate, I got second place in the election and from here my political identity was made. The second election was contested by BJP ticket in the year 1985-86 and reached the Madhya Pradesh Assembly for the first time. I opposed the party in the 1990 Lok Sabha elections. The party made the outsider its candidate instead of the local. When the party ignored me; Then I contested against BJP from Janjgir-Chapa Lok Sabha constituency in the year 1990-91 as a rebel candidate, but lost.

=== The establishment of Gondwana Ganatantra Party ===
In the nineties, when the entire Gondwana region was under the influence of Bahujan Samaj Party and Kanshi Ram and there was no way to save the Gondi culture-religion. Then in such a situation the idea of forming Gondwana Gantantra Party came up. The foundation of the Gondwana Ganatantra Party was laid down only in December 1990, but it was officially announced on 13 January 1991.

== See also ==
- List of political parties in India
- Tuleshwar Singh Markam
- Gondwana Ganatantra Party
