= Neena Verma =

Indian politician (born 1957)

Neena Vikram Verma

Member of the Madhya Pradesh Legislative Assembly
- Incumbent
- Assumed office 8 December 2013
- Constituency: Dhar

Personal details
- Born: 19 October 1957 (age 68) Ajmer, Rajasthan, India
- Party: Bharatiya Janata Party
- Spouse: Vikram Verma
- Children: 3 daughters
- Relatives: Parvesh Verma (Son-in-Law)

Neena Verma (19 October 1957) is an Indian politician from Madhya Pradesh state. She is a member of the Bharatiya Janata Party (BJP) and a Member of the Madhya Pradesh Legislative Assembly for Dhar Vidhan Sabha Constituency. Her husband is Vikram Verma, a senior BJP politician and former Union Minister.

== Political career ==
Verma ran on the BJP ticket in the 2008 Madhya Pradesh Legislative Assembly Election from Dhar Vidhan Sabha Constituency. Balmukund Goutam of the Indian National Congress (INC) won the seat by two votes in the first vote count; he received 50,507 votes against Verma's 50,505. Verma and her party requested to recount the votes, and she was then declared winner by only one vote. The final tally of votes was 50,510 to 50,509.

Goutam challenged Verma's election and the recounting process in the Madhya Pradesh High Court in 2009. He petitioned that there was misconduct in counting the postal votes. The Indore Bench of the High Court ruled in favour of Goutam on 19 October 2012, and declared Verma's election void on the grounds of non-compliance of the provisions of the Representation of Peoples Act. Verma filed a recrimination petition against the eligibility of Goutam, in that he did not reveal his criminal background in his affidavit at the time of filing his nomination for the assembly election in 2008, leading to a violation of section 33 (A) and section 123 of Representation of the People Act. However, the Bench rejected the petition on 23 November 2012. Goutam was declared elected by the Court on 14 August 2013 and took his oath of office on 24 September 2013.

The BJP gave a ticket to Verma to contest from the Dhar Constituency in the 2013 state assembly election, held on 25 November. Her main opponent was Balmukund Goutam, whom she defeated with a margin of 11,482 votes.

On 20 November 2017, the Madhya Pradesh High Court nullified Verma's election after it was discovered that she left several columns in her affidavit blank.

== Personal life ==
Verma is married to Vikram Verma, who is a senior BJP politician, former leader of opposition in the Madhya Pradesh Legislative Assembly and former Union Cabinet Minister of Youth Affairs and Sports. She owns 2.592 ha (6.40 acres) of land in Dhar as per an affidavit submitted by her husband while filing a nomination for Rajya Sabha in 2006. She resides in Bangiey Bhopal, Bhopal, capital city of Madhya Pradesh.
