= Vikram Verma =

Indian politician

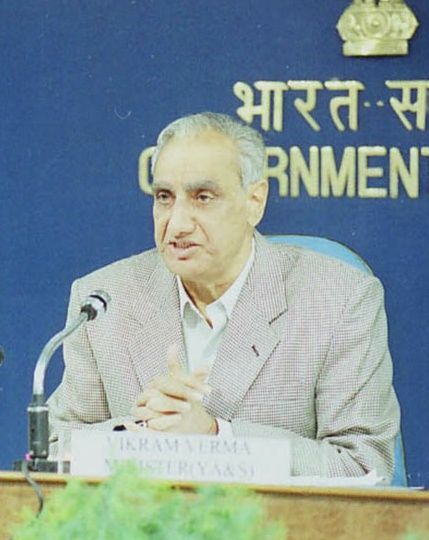
- Vikram Verma in 2004

Minister of Youth Affairs and Sports, Government of India
- In office 26 August 2002 – 13 May 2004
- Prime Minister: Atal Bihari Vajpayee
- Succeeded by: Sunil Dutt

Member of Parliament, Rajya Sabha
- In office April 2000 – April 2012
- Constituency: Madhya Pradesh

Personal details
- Born: 23 January 1944 (age 82) Dharampuri, Central India Agency, British India
- Party: Bharatiya Janata Party
- Spouse: Neena Verma

Vikram Verma (born 23 January 1944) is an Indian politician and a leader of the Bharatiya Janata Party (BJP) from Dhar, Madhya Pradesh. He formerly served as a Member of Parliament (MP) in the Rajya Sabha. He also served as a Minister in the Government of India for Youth and Sports Affairs from 2002 to 2004.

== Personal life ==
Verma was born in a Jat family of Kharagdaniya gotra in village Dharampuri of Dhar district in Madhya Pradesh. His father is Ganpat Singh Verma. He married Neena Verma on 22 June 1978. Neena is a Member of the legislative assembly (MLA) from Dhar, Indore. They have three daughters. His eldest daughter is married to the elder son of Sahib Singh Verma, former Chief Minister of Delhi.

== Education ==
Verma did his primary education in Dharampuri village. He graduated from Christian College, Indore. He received his M.A. (Hindi & Political Science) from Indore Christian College, Indore. He completed LL.B. from Indore Christian College, Indore.

== Corruption allegations ==
On 17 July 2015, an Indian Right to Information (RTI) activist, lodged a complaint against Verma which was never proved.

== Political career ==
- He was president of the students' union in his college life.
- 1969-72 : he remained chairman of Dharampuri Municipality.
- 1977-80 : he was first time elected member of state assembly and appointed parliamentary secretary.
- 1980-85, Member, Legislative Assembly, Madhya Pradesh and was Pradesh mantri of Bhartiya Janta Party.
- 1989-93 Cabinet Minister, School Education, Higher Education, Sports, Culture, Government of Madhya Pradesh.
- 1990-93 and 1993-98 1978-80 Parliament Secretary, Education, Sports and Youth Welfare, Government of Madhya Pradesh
- 1993-98 Leader of the Opposition, Legislative Assembly, Madhya Pradesh
- August 2002-04 Union Cabinet Minister of youth affairs and sports, Member of Rajya Sabha in Third Vajpayee Ministry
- 2006 Re-elected to Rajya Sabha
- 2007- Appointed National Vice President of Bharatiya Janata Party

== Awards ==
Verma won several awards in national level debates in Literature and participated in literary and socio-cultural activities.
