= Kalu Singh Thakur =

Indian politician

Member of the Madhya Pradesh Legislative Assembly
- Incumbent
- Assumed office 3 December 2023
- Preceded by: Panchilal Meda
- Constituency: Dharampuri
- In office 2013–2018
- Succeeded by: Panchilal Meda

Personal details
- Party: Bharatiya Janata Party
- Profession: Politician

Kalu Singh Thakur is an Indian politician from Madhya Pradesh. He won two times as an MLA in 2013 and 2023 from Dharampuri, as a member of the Bharatiya Janata Party.
