= Bhagirath Bhanwar =

Indian politician

Member of Parliament, Lok Sabha
- In office 1971-1980
- Preceded by: Sur Singh
- Succeeded by: Dileep Singh Bhuria
- Constituency: Jhabua, Madhya Pradesh

Member of the Madhya Pradesh Legislative Assembly
- In office 1962-1971
- Preceded by: Chatrarsingh
- Constituency: Alirajpur

Personal details
- Born: 2 December 1936
- Died: 10 February 2004 (aged 67)
- Party: Janata Party
- Other political affiliations: Samyukta Socialist Party
- Spouse: Narmada Devi

Bhagirath Bhanwar (2 December 1936 - 10 February 2004) was an Indian politician. He was elected to the lower House of Parliament, the Lok Sabha, from Ratlam Jhabua, Madhya Pradesh, India.
