= Manawar Assembly constituency =

Constituency of the Madhya Pradesh legislative assembly in India

Coordinates: 22.24°N 75.09°E

Manawar
- Constituency No. 199 for the Madhya Pradesh Legislative Assembly

Constituency details
- Country: India
- Region: Central India
- State: Madhya Pradesh
- District: Dhar
- Lok Sabha constituency: Dhar
- Established: 1972
- Reservation: ST

Member of Legislative Assembly
- 16th Madhya Pradesh Legislative Assembly
- Incumbent Hiralal Alawa
- Party: Indian National Congress
- Elected year: 2023
- Preceded by: Ranjana Baghel

Manawar is one of the 230 Vidhan Sabha (Legislative Assembly) constituencies of Madhya Pradesh state in central India. It comprises Manawar tehsil in Dhar district. As of 2023, it is represented by Hiralal Alawa of the Indian National Congress party.

== Members of the Legislative Assembly ==
Election	Member	Party
1967	Shivbhanu Solanki	Indian National Congress
1972	Shivbhanu Solanki	Indian National Congress
1977	Shivbhanu Solanki	Indian National Congress
1980	Shivbhanu Solanki	Indian National Congress (Indira)
1985	Shivbhanu Solanki	Indian National Congress
1990	Gajendra Singh Rajukhedi	Indian National Congress
1993	Dariyav Singh Solanki	Indian National Congress
1998	Dariyav Singh Solanki	Indian National Congress
2003	Ranjana Baghel	Bharatiya Janata Party
2008	Ranjana Baghel	Bharatiya Janata Party
2013	Ranjana Baghel	Bharatiya Janata Party
2018	Hiralal Alawa	Indian National Congress
2023	Hiralal Alawa	Indian National Congress

== Election results ==
=== 2023 ===
2023 Madhya Pradesh Legislative Assembly election: Manawar
Party	Candidate	Votes	%	±%
INC	Hiralal Alawa	90,229	47.87	−10.56
BJP	Kannoj Parmeshwar (Shiwram Gopal)	89,521	47.5	+11.81
AAP	Lalsingh Barman	2,847	1.51	+0.71
Bahujan Dravida Party	Lal Singh Solanki	1,769	0.94	
NOTA	None of the above	1,814	0.96	−0.35
Majority		708	0.37	−22.37
Turnout		188,484	77.86	−1.59
INC hold		Swing		

=== 2018 ===
2018 Madhya Pradesh Legislative Assembly election: Manawar
Party	Candidate	Votes	%	±%
INC	Hiralal Alawa	101,500	58.43	
BJP	Ranjna Baghel	61,999	35.69	
SS	Jagadish Muwel	4,619	2.66	
BSP	Amichand Muwel	1,916	1.1	
NOTA	None of the above	2,278	1.31	
Majority		39,501	22.74	
Turnout		173,706	79.45	
INC gain from BJP		Swing		

== See also ==
- Manawar
