= Balmukund Goutam =

Indian politician

Balmukund Singh Gautam

Member of Madhya Pradesh Legislative Assembly
- In office 24 September 2013 – 8 December 2013
- Succeeded by: Neena Verma
- Constituency: Dhar

Personal details
- Born: Lebad village, Dhar district, Madhya Pradesh
- Party: Indian National Congress
- Occupation: Businessman
- Profession: Politician

Balmukund Singh Gautam (Hindi pronunciation: [balmʊkʊnd̪ ɡəʊt̪əm]) is an Indian politician from Madhya Pradesh state. A member of the Indian National Congress, He served as a Member of the Madhya Pradesh Legislative Assembly (Madhya Pradesh Vidhan Sabha) for Dhar Constituency.

== Political career ==
Balmukund Singh Gautam is a member of the second largest political party in India, the Indian National Congress. He is a president of Dhar District Congress Committee.

He ran on the Congress ticket in the 2008 Madhya Pradesh Legislative Assembly Election from Dhar Vidhan Sabha Constituency, but lost due to unfair means, against Neena Verma of the Bharatiya Janata Party (BJP). Gautam won the seat by two votes in the first vote count; he received 50,507 votes against Verma's 50,505. Verma and her party requested to recount the votes, and she was declared winner by a margin of only one vote. The final tally of votes was 50,510 to 50,509.

He was very confident and challenged Verma's election and the recounting process in the Madhya Pradesh High Court in 2009. He petitioned that there was a misconduct in counting the postal votes. The Indore Bench of High Court ruled in favour of Gautam and declared Verma's election void on the grounds of non-compliance of the provisions of the Representation of Peoples Act. Verma filed a recrimination petition against Gautam, which was rejected by the Bench. He was declared elected by the Court and took his oath of office on 24 September 2013.

On 5 November 2013, the All India Congress Committee announced Gautam as the party's candidate from Dhar Constituency for the 2013 state legislative assembly election; the election held on 25 November. His nomination was opposed by some Congress leaders from Dhar. He lost to Neena Verma by a margin of 11,482 votes.

== Arrest ==
The Rajasthan Police seized a tanker in Subhash Nagar, Bhilwara, for carrying illegal liquor on 3 August 2003, and registered a case under the Rajasthan Excise Act against five people, including Gautam and his younger brother Rakesh Singh. Gautam was arrested on 11 December 2012 from a hotel in Pithampur by Rajasthan Police with the help of Dhar and Jhabua police. His brother was arrested from Delhi on 15 April 2012 with the help of Dhar, Khandwa and Delhi Police.
