= Hiralal Alawa =

Indian politician

Member of the Madhya Pradesh Legislative Assembly
- Incumbent
- Assumed office 2018
- Preceded by: Ranjana Baghel
- Constituency: Manawar

Personal details
- Political party: Indian National Congress
- Profession: Politician

Dr. Hiralal Alawa is an Indian politician from Madhya Pradesh. He is a two time elected member of the Madhya Pradesh Legislative Assembly from 2018 and 2023, representing Manawar Assembly constituency as a Member of the Indian National Congress.

== See also ==
- List of chief ministers of Madhya Pradesh
- Madhya Pradesh Legislative Assembly
