= Bhanwar Singh Shekhawat =

Indian politician

Bhanwar Singh Shekhawat (भवरसिंह शेखावत) (born 1949) is an Indian politician and member of the Indian National Congress. Shekhawat was a former chairman of Apex Bank Madhya Pradesh, and currently member of the Madhya Pradesh Legislative Assembly from Badnawar and previously from Indore-5.

An alumnus of Indore University, he holds an M.A. in Economics (1975), M.A. in Political Science (1979), and Bachelor of Laws (L.L.B.) (1982).

== Prosecution Sanction, 2013 ==
On 26 June 2013, the Madhya Pradesh state government granted sanction to prosecute Shekhawat and eight others for allegedly facilitating a wrongful settlement of a loan taken by IAS officer Ramesh Thete’s wife, Manda. The Lokayukta’s Special Police Establishment had earlier registered an FIR and sought prosecution approval.

== Allegations ==
Manda Thete, wife of IAS officer Ramesh Thete, had obtained a loan of ₹25 lakh in 2002 from Apex Bank, which grew to ₹92.87 lakh. She settled the payment out of guidelines which caused the bank to lose ₹39.75 lakh. She, her husband and then chairman of the bank, Shekhawat, was charged with fraud. The review petition for the charges were dismissed.
