= Suraj Bhanu Solanki =

Indian politician (1960–2021)

Member of Parliament, Lok Sabha
- In office 1989-1996
- Constituency: Dhar, Madhya Pradesh

Personal details
- Born: 4 April 1960 Bhopal, Madhya Pradesh
- Died: 21 March 2021 (aged 60)
- Party: Indian National Congress
- Spouse: Geetanjali Solanki

Suraj Bhanu Solanki (4 April 1960 – 21 March 2021) was an Indian politician. He was elected to the lower House of Parliament the Lok Sabha from Dhar, Madhya Pradesh as a member of the Indian National Congress.

Solanti died from a heart attack on 21 March 2021, aged 60.
