= Sardarpur =

- Town
- Location in Madhya Pradesh, India Sardarpur (India)
- Coordinates: 22°39′37″N 74°58′44″E
- Country: India
- State: Madhya Pradesh
- District: Dhar

Population (2001)
  - Total: 6,120

Languages
  - Official: Hindi
- Time zone: UTC+5:30 (IST)
- Postal code: 454111
- ISO 3166 code: IN-MP
- Vehicle registration: MP

Sardarpur is a town and a nagar panchayat in Dhar district in the Indian state of Madhya Pradesh. It is a town on Mahi River on the Malwa plateau. There is an ancient Shivalinga situated at the bank of Mahi river at a place called Shree Jhineshwar Dham; Shri Mohankheda Jain Thirth and Bhopawar Jain Tirth are located nearby.

It is one of the 230 Vidhan Sabha (Legislative Assembly) constituencies of Madhya Pradesh state in central India.

== History ==
Sardarpur was a British station in Central India during the British Raj, and was within the state of Gwalior. It was the headquarters of the political agent for the Bhopawar agency, and of the Malwa Bhil corps, originally raised in 1837 and converted into a military police battalion by around 1900.

== Demographics ==
As of 2001 India census, Sardarpur had a population of 6,119. Males constitute 52% of the population and females 48%. Sardarpur has an average literacy rate of 70%, higher than the national average of 59.5%: male literacy is 79%, and female literacy is 60%. In Sardarpur, 15% of the population is under six years of age.

== Transport ==
The nearest airport is in Indore.
