= Dhar district, India =

Coordinates: 22°36′N 75°18′E

Dhar district
- District of Madhya Pradesh
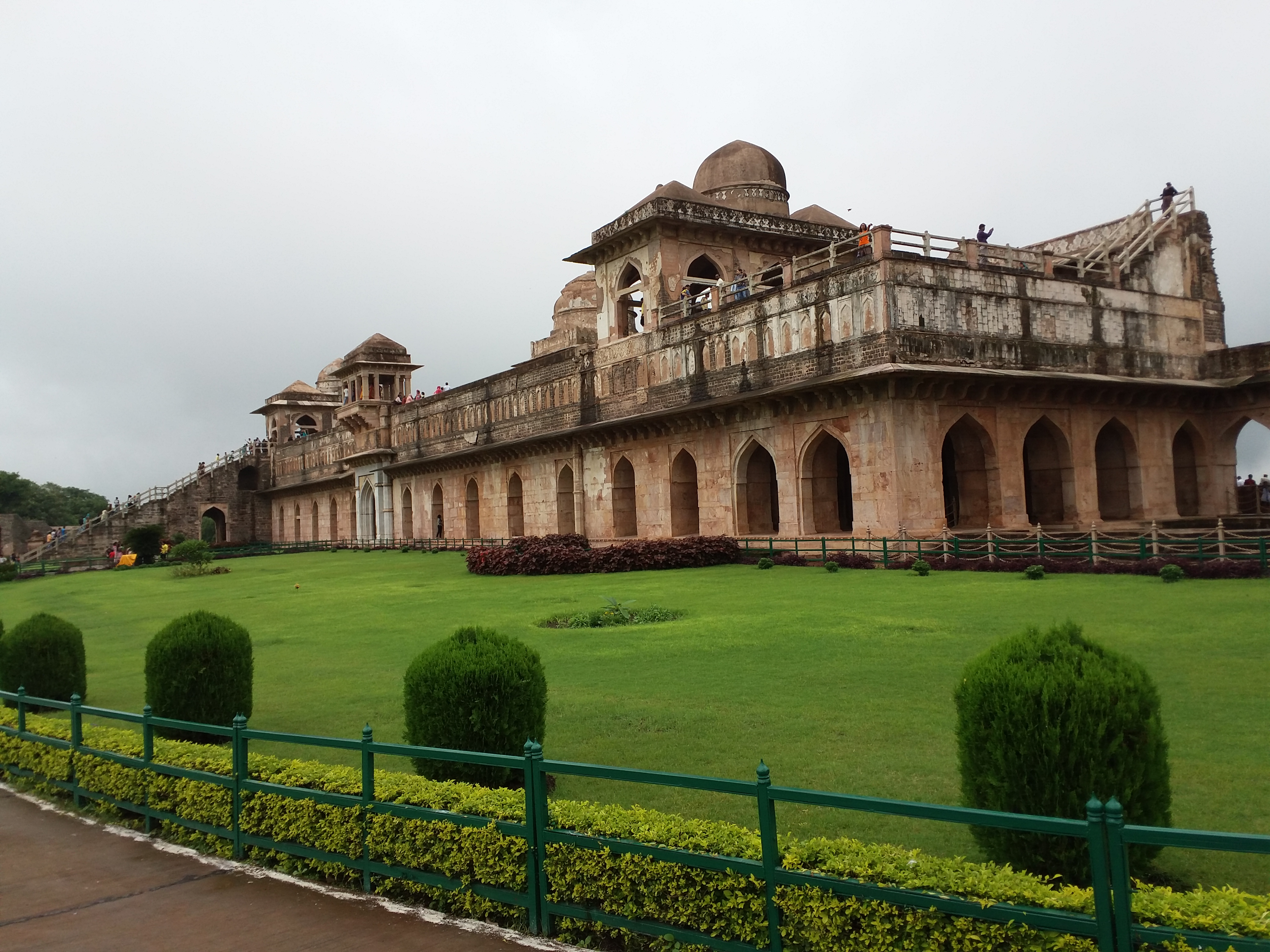
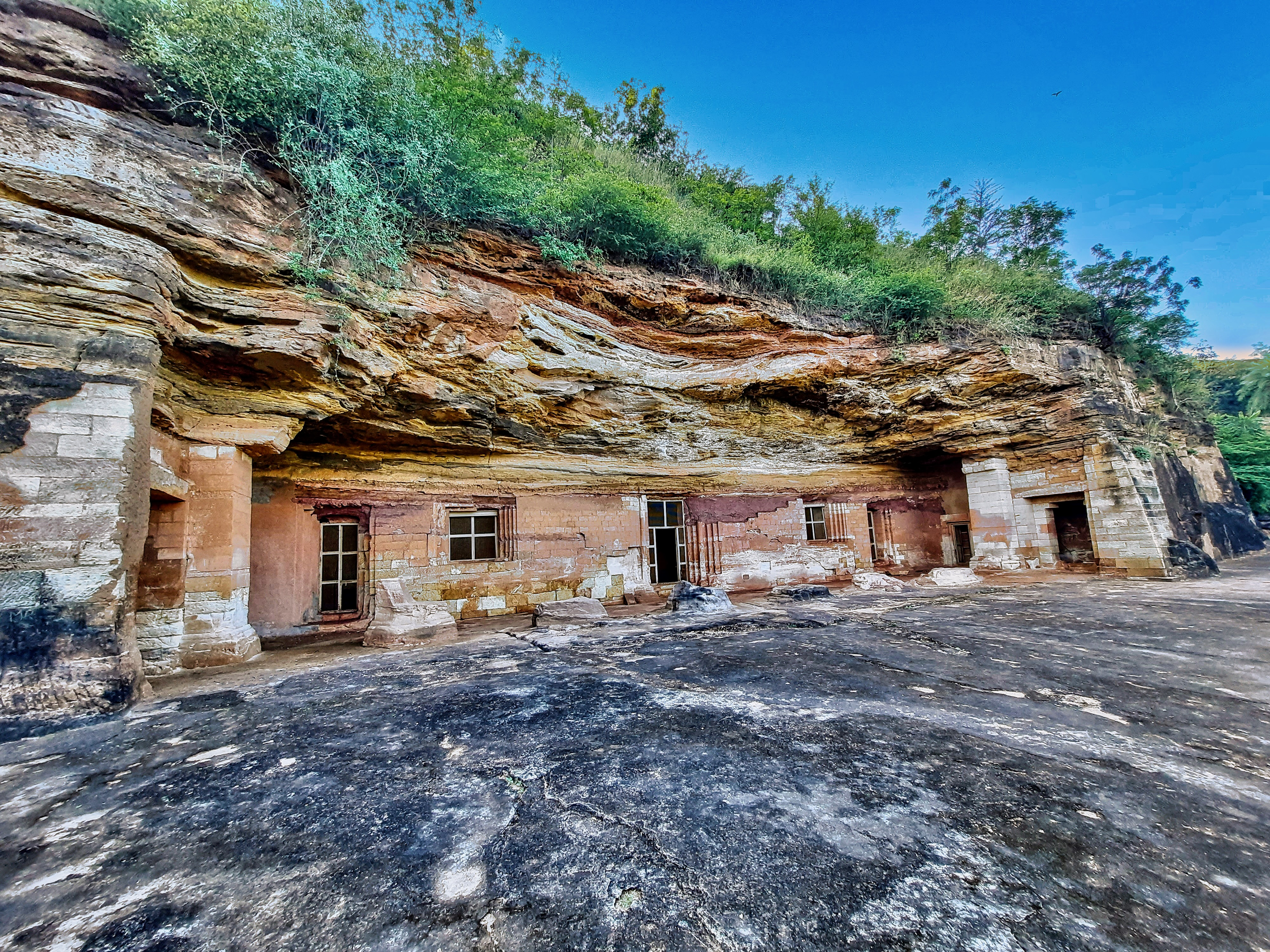
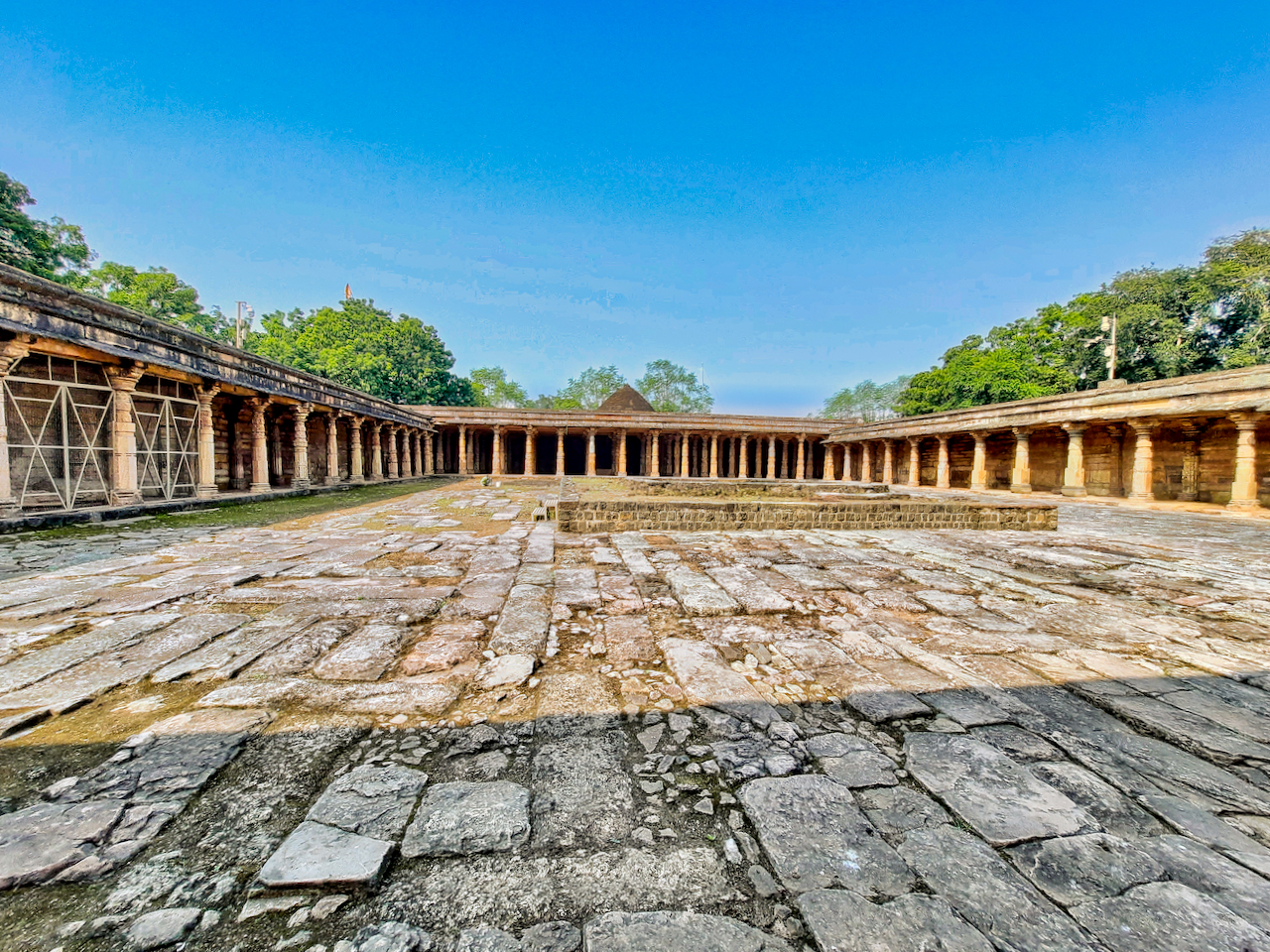
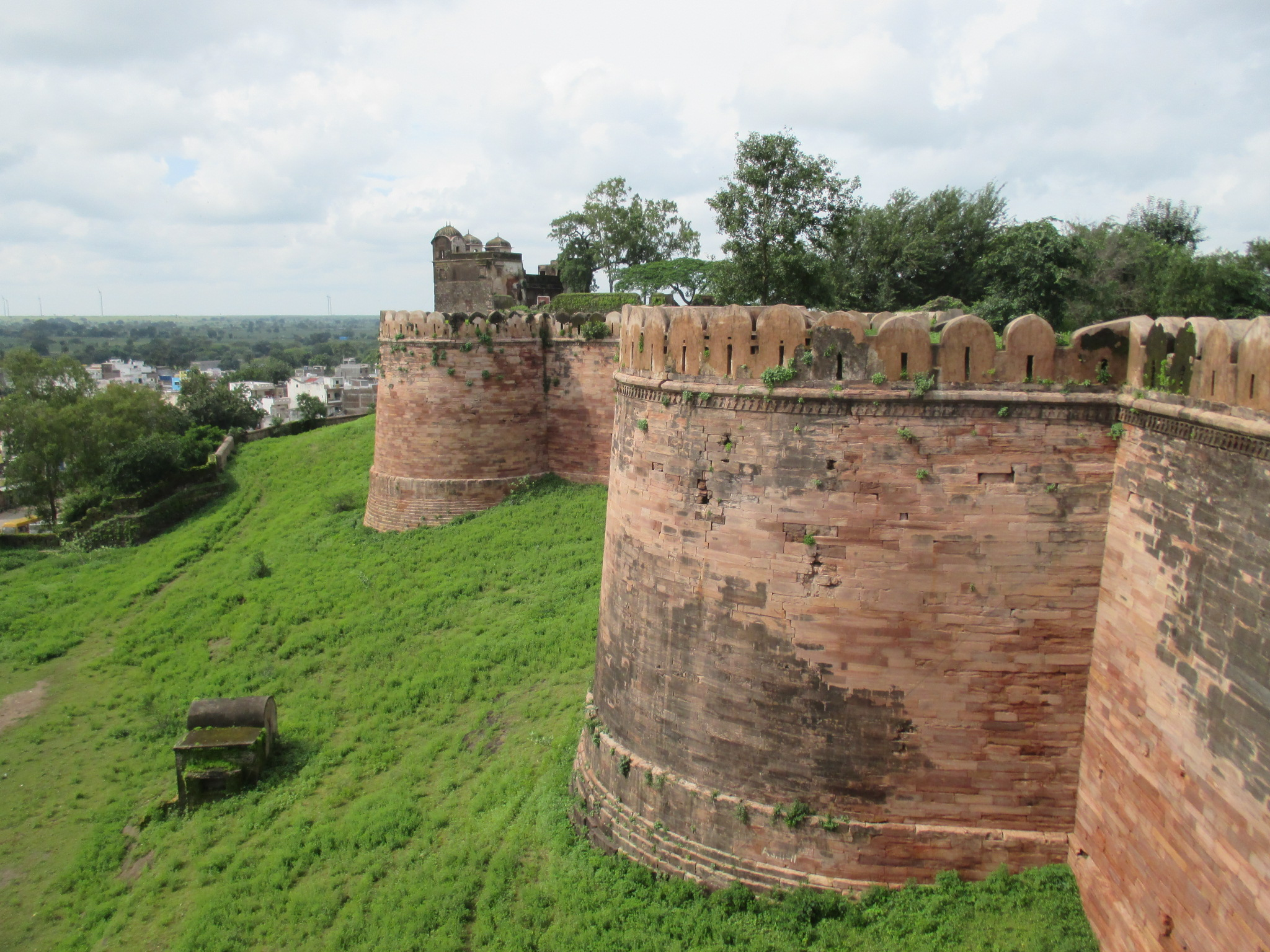
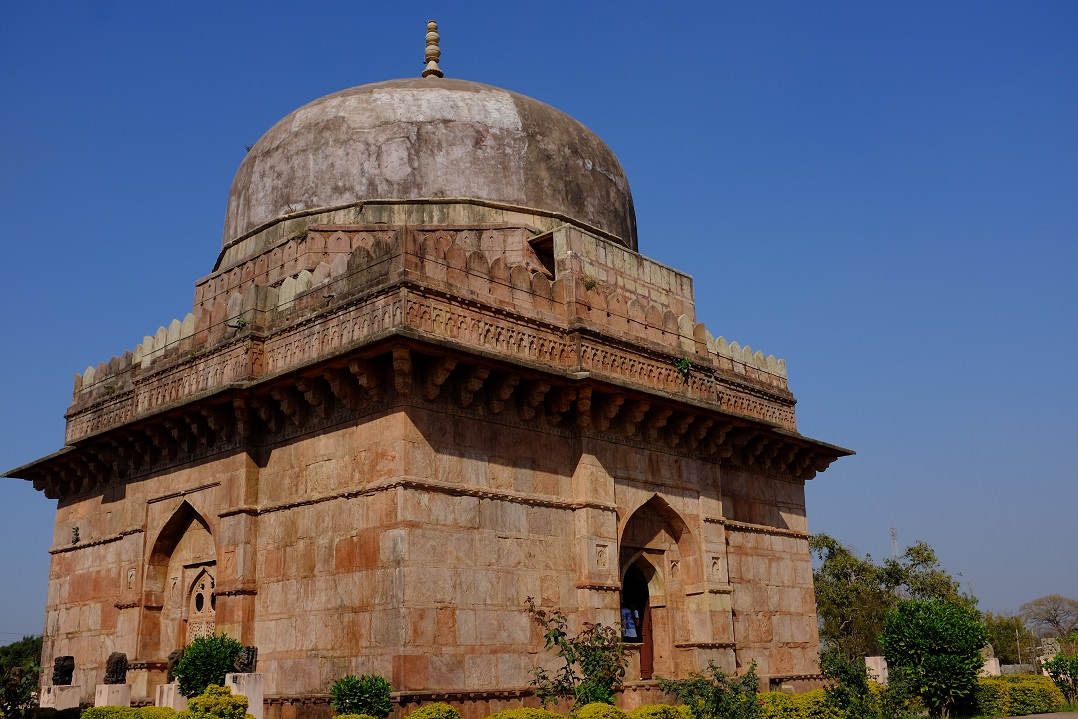
- Clockwise from top-left: Jahaz Mahal at Mandu, Bagh Caves, Dhar Fort, Chhapan Mahal, Bhojshala

- Location of Dhar district in Madhya Pradesh
- Country: India
- State: Madhya Pradesh
- Division: Indore
- Headquarters: Dhar

Government
  - Lok Sabha constituencies: Dhar
  - Vidhan Sabha constituencies: Sardarpur (196); Gandhwani (197); Kukshi (198); Manawar (199); Dharampuri (200); Dhar (201); Badnawar (202)

Area
  - Total: 8,153 km^{2} (3,148 sq mi)

Population (2011)
  - Total: 2,185,793
  - Density: 268.1/km^{2} (694.4/sq mi)

Demographics
  - Literacy: 60.57 per cent
  - Sex ratio: 961
- Time zone: UTC+05:30 (IST)
- Website: dhar.nic.in

Dhar district (Hindi pronunciation: [d̪ʱaːɾ]) is a district of Madhya Pradesh state in central India. The historic town of Dhar is administrative headquarters of the district.

The district has a land area of 8,153 square kilometres (3,148 sq mi). It is bounded by the districts of Ratlam to the north, Ujjain to the northeast, Indore to the east, Khargone (West Nimar) to the southeast, Barwani to the south, Jhabua and Alirajpur to the west. It is part of the Indore Division of Madhya Pradesh. The population of the district is 2,185,793 (2011 census), an increase of 25.60% from its 2001 population of 1,740,329. Pithampur is a large industrial area comes under Dhar District. Kukshi is the largest tehsil of the district.

== History ==
Dhar district was a historical centre of the Malwa region. It was part of the Paramara kingdom for four centuries, and was ruled by Raja Bhoj, who shifted the capital from Ujjain to Dhar. In 1305, Alauddin Khilji conquered Malwa from the Paramaras. In 1405, the Governor of Malwa, Dilawar Khan, became independent from Delhi and founded the Malwa Sultanate with the capital at Dhar. His successor Hoshang Shah moved his capital to Mandu, also in Dhar district, which he developed with many mosques and monuments. His son was poisoned by Mahmud Khilji, who assumed the throne and began the rule of the Khiljis over Malwa. Their rule lasted until 1531, when Sher Shah Suri put Shujat Khan in charge of Malwa. His son Baz Bahadur fought the Mughal Army during their conquest of the region, and was forced to flee after he was defeated. According to legend, his beloved queen Roopmati committed suicide rather than be dishonoured.

Dhar became part of the Malwa Subah of the Mughal Empire, and was visited by Akbar and Jahangir. After the decline of Mughal power, the Marathas captured Malwa under the rule of Peshwa Bajirao. Bajirao in 1732 divided Malwa among many Maratha chiefs, and Dhar was given to Anand Rao Pawar. His dynasty continued to rule the state even after the Marathas fell to the British. In 1857, freedom fighters captured the fort at Dhar which they held until October 1857. The local people faced cruel reprisals from British forces after they retook the fort. Dhar was briefly annexed by the British after the revolt before it was returned to Anand Rao Pawar III in 1860. Dhar State joined the Indian Union in 1948, and became part of the state of Madhya Bharat. It then became part of Madhya Pradesh in 1956.

== Geography ==
The Vindhya Range runs east and west through the district. The northern part of the district lies on the Malwa plateau. The northwestern portion of the district lies in the watershed of the Mahi River and its tributaries, while the northeastern part of the district lies in the watershed of the Chambal River, which drains into the Ganges via the Yamuna River. The portion of the district south of the ridge of the Vindhyas lies in the watershed of the Narmada River, which forms the southern boundary of the district.

== Divisions ==
Dhar district is divided into 6 sub-divisions: Dhar, Sardarpur, Badnawar, Manawar, Kukshi and Dharampuri (Newly Added). These sub-divisions are further divided into 8 tehsils: Dhar, Badnawar, Dharampuri, Sardarpur, Manawar, Kukshi, Dahi and Gandhwani.

There are seven Vidhan Sabha constituencies in this district: Sardarpur, Gandhwani, Kukshi, Manawar, Dharampuri, Dhar and Badnawar. All of these are part of the only Lok Sabha constituency in this district : Dhar Lok Sabha Constituency.

Villages in Dhar district include Kadod Kala, Tirla, and Tornod.

== Demographics ==
Historical population
Year	Pop.	±% p.a.
1901	293,103	—
1911	343,256	+1.59%
1921	393,577	+1.38%
1931	432,482	+0.95%
1941	473,721	+0.91%
1951	503,965	+0.62%
1961	643,774	+2.48%
1971	842,400	+2.73%
1981	1,057,469	+2.30%
1991	1,367,412	+2.60%
2001	1,740,329	+2.44%
2011	2,185,793	+2.31%

Religions in Dhar district (2011)
Religion	Percent
Hinduism	93.84%
Islam	5.31%
Jainism	0.56%
Other or not stated	0.29%

According to the 2011 census Dhar District has a population of 2,185,793, roughly equal to the nation of Latvia or the US state of New Mexico. This gives it a ranking of 208th in India (out of a total of 640). The district has a population density of 268 inhabitants per square kilometre (690/sq mi) . Its population growth rate over the decade 2001-2011 was 25.53%. Dhar has a sex ratio of 961 females for every 1000 males, and a literacy rate of 60.57%. 18.90% of the population lives in urban areas. Scheduled Castes and Scheduled Tribes made up 6.65% and 55.94% of the population respectively.

Languages of Dhar district (2011)
1. Hindi (51.3%)
2. Malvi (15.6%)
3. Nimadi (15.3%)
4. Bhili (11.5%)
5. Bhilali (3.87%)
6. Others (2.45%)

At the time of the 2011 Census of India, 51.28% of the population in the district spoke Hindi, 15.62% Malvi, 15.29% Nimadi, 11.49% Bhili and 3.87% Bhilali as their first language. The local dialect is Malvi in most of the district, with a small part in the south speaking Nimadi. Bhili is spoken by a minority of Bhils, especially in the far-western Dahi tehsil.

== Tourist places ==
- Bhopawar Jain Tirth
- Mohan Kheda Jain Tirth
- Dinosaur Fossil National Park Bagh
- Nityanand ashram
- Bhaktamar Tirth
- Dhareshwar Temple
- Gadh Kalika Devi
- Phadke Art Studio – Dhar
- Lat Masjid
- Jal Mahal Sadalpur
- Dhar Fort
- Jheera Bagh Palace
- Bhoj Shala
- Lath Masjid
- Bagh Caves
