= Dharampuri Assembly constituency =

Constituency of the Madhya Pradesh legislative assembly in India

Coordinates: 22.16°N 75.35°E

Dharampuri
- Constituency No. 200 for the Madhya Pradesh Legislative Assembly

Constituency details
- Country: India
- Region: Central India
- State: Madhya Pradesh
- District: Dhar
- Lok Sabha constituency: Dhar
- Established: 1972
- Reservation: ST

Member of Legislative Assembly
- 16th Madhya Pradesh Legislative Assembly
- Incumbent Kalu Singh Thakur
- Party: Bharatiya Janata Party
- Elected year: 2023
- Preceded by: Panchilal Meda

Dharampuri is one of the 230 Vidhan Sabha (Legislative Assembly) constituencies of Madhya Pradesh state in central India.

It is part of Dhar district and is reserved for members of the Scheduled Tribes.

== Members of the Legislative Assembly ==
Election	Member	Party
1967	Fatebhansingh Ramsingh	Indian National Congress
1972	Fatebhansingh Ramsingh	Indian National Congress
1977	Kirat Singh Thakur	Indian National Congress
1980	Kirat Singh Thakur	Indian National Congress (Indira)
1985	Kirat Singh Thakur	Indian National Congress
1990	Jhinga Lal Patel	Bharatiya Janata Party
1993	Pratapsingh Baghel	Indian National Congress
1998	Jagdish Muvel	Bharatiya Janata Party
2003	Jagdish Muvel	Bharatiya Janata Party
2008	Panchilal Meda	Indian National Congress
2013	Kalu Singh Thakur	Bharatiya Janata Party
2018	Panchilal Meda	Indian National Congress
2023	Kalu Singh Thakur	Bharatiya Janata Party

== Election results ==
=== 2023 ===
2023 Madhya Pradesh Legislative Assembly election: Dharampuri
Party	Candidate	Votes	%	±%
BJP	Kalu Singh Thakur	84,207	47.76	+6.12
INC	Panchilal Meda	83,851	47.56	−3.09
Independent	Chouhan Raju Ben	3,964	2.25	
NOTA	None of the above	2,455	1.39	−1.08
Majority		356	0.2	−8.81
Turnout		176,309	80.52	+1.05
BJP gain from INC		Swing		

=== 2018 ===
2018 Madhya Pradesh Legislative Assembly election: Dharampuri
Party	Candidate	Votes	%	±%
INC	Panchilal Meda	78,504	50.65	
BJP	Gopal Kannoj	64,532	41.64	
Independent	Shriram Dawar	2,456	1.58	
Independent	Rupendra Singh Thakur (Chintu Bhaiya)	1,917	1.24	
BSP	Punja Bundela	1,811	1.17	
NOTA	None of the above	3,832	2.47	
Majority		13,972	9.01	
Turnout		154,985	79.47	
INC gain from BJP		Swing		

== See also ==
- Dharampuri
