= Chhatar Singh Darbar =

Indian politician

Member of Parliament, Lok Sabha
- In office 19 May 2019 – 4 June 2024
- Constituency: Dhar

Personal details
- Born: 8 January 1954 (age 72) Dhar, Madhya Pradesh
- Party: Bharatiya Janata Party
- Spouse: Hemlata Singh Darbar
- Children: 3 sons and 2 daughters

Chhatar Singh Darbar (born 8 January 1954; Hindi pronunciation: [t͡ʃʰət̪əɾ sɪŋgʱ d̪əɾbaːɾ]) is a member of the 17th Lok Sabha of India. He represented the Dhar constituency of Madhya Pradesh and is a member of the Bharatiya Janata Party (BJP) political party.
