= Gondwana Ganatantra Party =

Gondwana Gantantra Party
- Abbreviation: GGP
- President: Tuleshwar Singh Markam
- Founder: Hira Singh Markam
- Founded: 13 January 1991 (35 years ago)
- Headquarters: Village Tiwarta, Teh. Katghora, Korba district, Chhattisgarh
- Ideology: Gondi interests
- Colours: Violet
- ECI status: Registered Unrecognized Party
- Alliance: BSP+(2023-2024)
- Seats in Chhattisgarh Legislative Assembly: 1 / 90

Election symbol
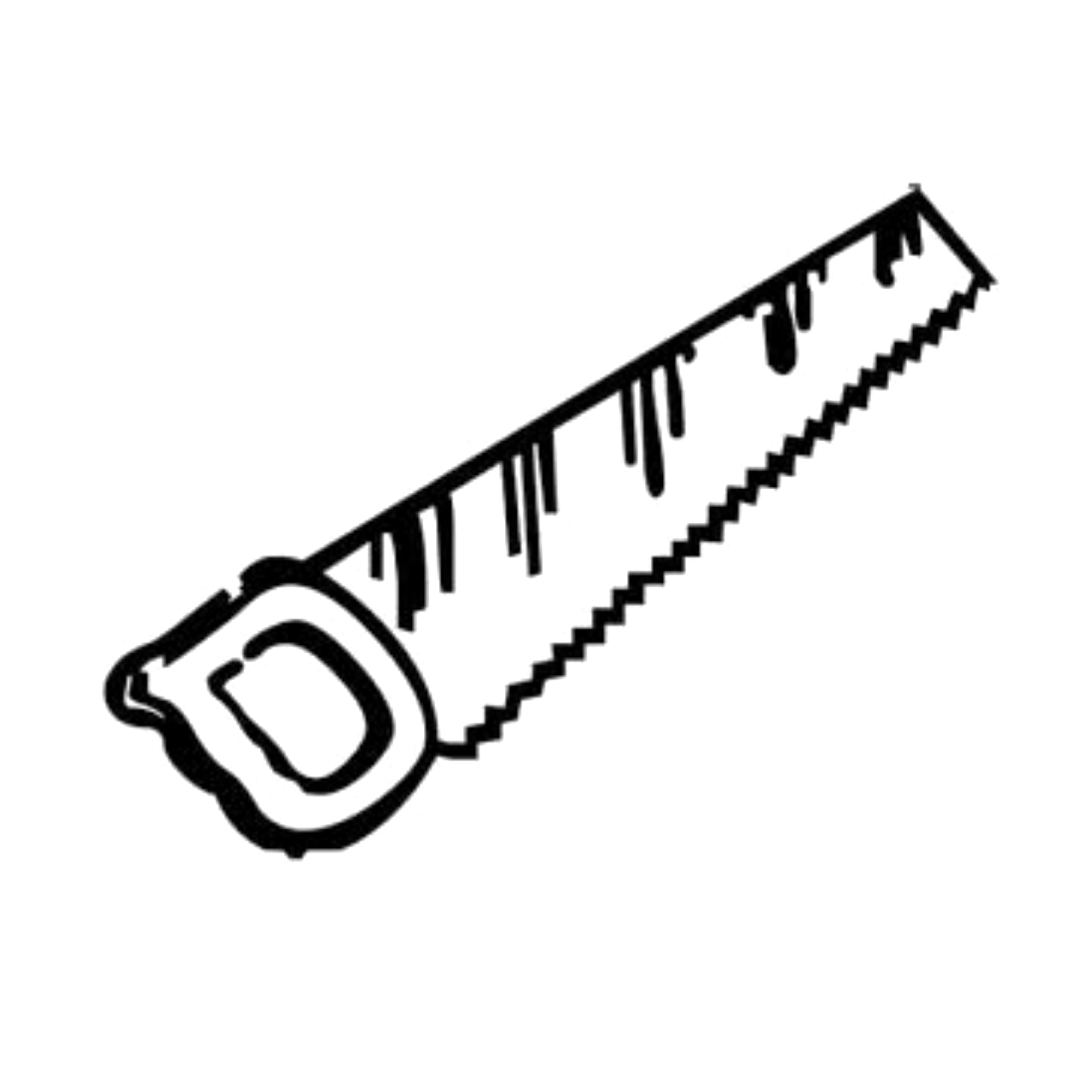

The Gondwana Gantantra Party or GGP is a political party in India, founded by Hira Singh Markam. It primarily works for the tribal community and its politics.

== History ==
GGP was formed in 1991 to plead for the rights of the Gondi people, and to establish a separate Indian state of Gondwana in central India. After the demise of Hira Singh Markam, Amol astram took over as the new president of the party.

== Performance in elections ==
- In 1999, Dharmraobaba Atram elected from Sironcha.

In the 2002 Vidhan Sabha elections in Uttar Pradesh, GGP had eight candidates, who together mustered 11,262 votes.

- In 2003 Vidhan Sabha elections in Madhya Pradesh, GGP had launched 61 candidates, who together mustered 512,102 votes and 3 MLAS were elected.

In the 2003 Vidhan Sabha elections in Chhattisgarh, GGP had 41 candidates, but no one was elected. In total, the party received 156,916 votes.

In the 2004 Lok Sabha elections, the party presented candidates from Madhya Pradesh, Chhattisgarh, Bihar, Uttar Pradesh and Maharashtra.

== Developments ==
The Gondwana Ganatantra Party had formed a pre-poll alliance with the Samajwadi Party for the 2018 Madhya Pradesh Legislative Assembly election. But now GGP has formed the pre-poll alliance with the Bahujan Samaj Party.

The party formed a pre-poll alliance with the Bahujan Samaj Party for the 2023 Chhattisgarh Legislative Assembly election and won one seat.

== See also ==
- List of political parties in India
