= Bhind Lok Sabha constituency =

Lok Sabha Constituency in Madhya Pradesh, India

Coordinates: 26.6°N 78.8°E

Bhind
- Lok Sabha constituency
- Interactive Map Outlining Bhind Lok Sabha constituency

Constituency details
- Country: India
- Region: Central India
- State: Madhya Pradesh
- Assembly constituencies: Ater; Bhind; Lahar; Mehgaon; Gohad; Sewda; Bhander; Datia
- Established: 1952
- Total electors: 19,00,654
- Reservation: SC

Member of Parliament
- 18th Lok Sabha
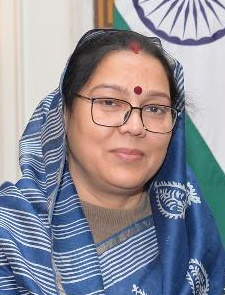
- Incumbent Sandhya Ray
- Party: Bharatiya Janata Party
- Elected year: 2024

Bhind is one of the 29 Lok Sabha constituencies in the Indian state of Madhya Pradesh. This constituency was reserved for the candidates belonging to the Scheduled castes in its first year as a stand-alone constituency, henceforth it became a general constituency. This constituency covers the entire Bhind and Datia districts.

== Assembly segments ==
Presently, after delimitation, this constituency comprises the following eight Vidhan Sabha (legislative assembly) segments:

| # | Name | District | Member | Party | 2024 Lead |
|---|---|---|---|---|---|
| 9 | Ater | Bhind | Hemant Satyadev Katare | INC | BJP |
| 10 | Bhind | Bhind | Narendra Singh Kushwah | BJP | BJP |
| 11 | Lahar | Bhind | Ambrish Sharma | BJP | BJP |
| 12 | Mehgaon | Bhind | Rakesh Shukla | BJP | BJP |
| 13 | Gohad (SC) | Bhind | Keshav Desai | INC | INC |
| 20 | Sewda | Datia | Pradeep Agrawal | BJP | INC |
| 21 | Bhander (SC) | Datia | Phool Singh Baraiya | INC | BJP |
| 22 | Datia | Datia | Ghanshyam Singh | INC | BJP |

Before delimitation of parliamentary constituencies in 2008, Bhind Lok Sabha constituency comprised the following eight Vidhan Sabha (legislative assembly) segments:

| # | Name | District | Member | Party |
|---|---|---|---|---|
| 9 | Gohad (SC) | Bhind | | |
| 10 | Mehgaon | Bhind | | |
| 11 | Attair | Bhind | | |
| 12 | Bhind | Bhind | | |
| 13 | Ron | Bhind | | |
| 14 | Lahar | Bhind | | |
| 22 | Seondha (SC) | Datia | | |
| 23 | Datia | Datia | | |

== Members of Parliament ==
BJP is the most successful political party in Bhind (Madhya Pradesh) Lok Sabha elections
1. BJP/BJS (11 terms) (64.7%)
2. INC (4 terms) (23.5%)
3. Janta Party (1 term) (5.88%)
4. Independent (1 term) (5.88%)

| Year | Member | Party |
|---|---|---|
| 1952 | Suraj Prasad | Indian National Congress |
| 1962 | Suraj Prasad | Indian National Congress |
| 1967 | Yashwant Singh Kushwah | Independent |
| 1971 | Vijaya Raje Scindia | Bharatiya Jana Sangh |
| 1977 | Raghubir Singh Machhand | Janata Party |
| 1980 | Kali Charan Sharma | Indian National Congress |
| 1984 | Rao Krishnapal (Maharaj Krishna Singh Judeo Datia) | Indian National Congress |
| 1989 | Narsingh Rao Dixit | Bharatiya Janata Party |
| 1991 | Yoganand Saraswati | Bharatiya Janata Party |
| 1996 | Ram Lakhan Singh | Bharatiya Janata Party |
| 1998 | Ram Lakhan Singh | Bharatiya Janata Party |
| 1999 | Ram Lakhan Singh | Bharatiya Janata Party |
| 2004 | Ram Lakhan Singh | Bharatiya Janata Party |
| 2009 | Ashok Argal | Bharatiya Janata Party |
| 2014 | Bhagirath Prasad | Bharatiya Janata Party |
| 2019 | Sandhya Ray | Bharatiya Janata Party |
| 2024 | Sandhya Ray | Bharatiya Janata Party |

== Election results ==
=== General election, 2024 ===
Vote share of Winning candidates
| 2024 | 51.2% |
| 2019 | 54.9% |
| 2014 | 55.4% |
| 2009 | 43.4% |
| 2004 | 40.6% |
| 1999 | 40.9% |
| 1998 | 42.2% |
| 1996 | 39.2% |

2024 Indian general election: Bhind
| Party | Candidate | Votes | % | ±% |
|---|---|---|---|---|
| BJP | Sandhya Ray | 537,065 | 51.20 | ▼3.73 |
| INC | Phool Singh Baraiya | 4,72,225 | 45.02 | ▲10.9 |
| BSP | Devashish Jarariya | 20,465 | 1.95 | ▼4.98 |
| NOTA | None of the above | 6534 | 0.62 | |
| Majority | | 64,840 | 6.18 | ▼14.65 |
| Turnout | | 10,49,007 (Note: postal ballots included) | 54.93 | ▲0.40 |
| BJP hold | | Swing | ▼3.73 | |

=== 2019 ===
2019 Indian general elections: Bhind
| Party | Candidate | Votes | % | ±% |
|---|---|---|---|---|
| BJP | Sandhya Rai | 527,694 | 54.93 | −0.53 |
| INC | Devashish Jarariya | 3,27,809 | 34.12 | +0.6 |
| BSP | Babu Ram Jamor | 66,613 | 6.93 | +2.3 |
| Majority | | 1,99,885 | 20.83 | −1.13 |
| Turnout | | 9,62,717 | 54.53 | |
| BJP hold | | Swing | ▼0.53 | |

=== 2014 ===
2014 Indian general elections: Bhind
| Party | Candidate | Votes | % | ±% |
|---|---|---|---|---|
| BJP | Bhagirath Prasad | 4,04,474 | 55.46 | +12.05 |
| INC | Imarti Devi | 2,44,513 | 33.52 | −6.28 |
| BSP | Manish Katroliya | 33,803 | 4.63 | −6.98 |
| BSD | Phool Singh Baraiya | 20,403 | 2.80 | N/A |
| AAP | Krishna Devi | 7,730 | 1.06 | N/A |
| Majority | | 1,59,961 | 21.94 | |
| Turnout | | 7,29,084 | 46.03 | |
| BJP hold | | Swing | | |

=== 2009 ===
2009 Indian general elections: Bhind
| Party | Candidate | Votes | % | ±% |
|---|---|---|---|---|
| BJP | Ashok Argal | 2,27,365 | 43.40 | |
| INC | Bhagirath Prasad | 2,08,479 | 39.80 | |
| BSP | D. R. Rahul | 60,803 | 11.61 | |
| Majority | | 18,886 | 3.61 | |
| Turnout | | 5,23,791 | 38.39 | |
| BJP hold | | Swing | | |

=== 2004 ===
2004 Indian general elections: Bhind
| Party | Candidate | Votes | % | ±% |
|---|---|---|---|---|
| BJP | Ram Lakhan Singh | 2,34,712 | 40.66 | |
| INC | Satyadev Katare | 2,27,766 | 39.45 | |
| SMSP | Phool Singh Baraiya | 59,679 | 10.34 | |
| BSP | Ramsingh Dhakre | 43,822 | 7.59 | |
| SP | Narendra Singh Bhadoria (Daddy) | 17,943 | 3.11 | |
| Majority | | 6,946 | 1.21 | |
| Turnout | | 5,78,922 | — | |
| BJP hold | | Swing | | |

=== 1999 ===
1999 Indian general elections: Bhind
| Party | Candidate | Votes | % | ±% |
|---|---|---|---|---|
| BJP | Ram Lakhan Singh | 2,70,766 | 40.94 | |
| INC | Satyadev Katare | 2,17,192 | 32.84 | |
| BSP | Kedar Nath Kachhi | 1,05,157 | 15.90 | |
| SP | Rambihari Kushwah | 58,577 | 8.86 | |
| Majority | | 53,574 | 8.10 | |
| Turnout | | 6,61,692 | — | |
| BJP hold | | Swing | | |

=== 1998 ===
1998 Indian general elections: Bhind
| Party | Candidate | Votes | % | ±% |
|---|---|---|---|---|
| BJP | Ram Lakhan Singh | 2,92,682 | 42.27 | |
| BSP | Kedar Nath Kachhi | 1,93,774 | 27.99 | |
| INC | Balendu Shukl | 1,37,530 | 19.86 | |
| Savarn Samaj Party | Mahesh Bhaiya | 18,031 | 2.60 | |
| Majority | | 98,908 | 14.28 | |
| Turnout | | 6,92,017 | — | |
| BJP hold | | Swing | | |

=== 1996 ===
1996 Indian general elections: Bhind
| Party | Candidate | Votes | % | ±% |
|---|---|---|---|---|
| BJP | Ram Lakhan Singh | 1,98,109 | 39.21 | |
| BSP | Kedar Nath Kushwah (Kachhi) | 1,82,311 | 36.08 | |
| INC | Dr. Pt Vishwanath Sharma | 50,888 | 10.07 | |
| Independent | Dr. Radhe Shyam Sharma | 20,791 | 4.12 | |
| AIIC(T) | Rajesh Singh Bhadoria | 10,781 | 2.13 | |
| Majority | | 15,798 | 3.13 | |
| Turnout | | 5,62,880 | — | |
| BJP hold | | Swing | | |

== See also ==
- Bhind district
- List of constituencies of the Lok Sabha
