= 1999 Indian general election in Madhya Pradesh =

General Election in Madhya Pradesh

Indian general election in Madhya Pradesh, 1999
- Oct 1999

40 seats

	First party	Second party
Party	BJP	INC
Seats before	30	10
Seats won	29	11
Seat change	▼1	▲1
Prime Minister before election
A. B. Vajpayee
BJP
Prime Minister after election
A. B. Vajpayee
BJP

In the 1999 Indian general election for Madhya Pradesh polls were held for 40 seats in the state. The result was a major victory for the Bharatiya Janata Party (BJP) which won 29 seats. The remaining 11 seats were won by Indian National Congress (INC).

== Election schedule ==
The polling schedule for the 1999 General Elections was announced by the Chief Election Commissioner on 11 July 1999.

Poll event	Phase		
Poll event	II	III	IV
Notification date	17 August 1999	21 August 1999	30 August 1999
Last date for filing nomination	24 August 1999	28 August 1999	6 September 1999
Scrutiny of nomination	25 August 1999	30 August 1999	7 September 1999
Last Date for withdrawal of nomination	27 August 1999	1 September 1999	9 September 1999
Date of poll	11 September 1999	18 September 1999	25 September 1999
Date of counting of votes/Result	6 October 1999		
No. of constituencies	14	14	12

== Parties and alliances ==
=== National Democratic Alliance ===
Party	Flag	Symbol	Leader	Seats contested
Bharatiya Janata Party			Uma Bharti	40

=== Indian National Congress ===
Party	Flag	Symbol	Leader	Seats contested
Indian National Congress			Madhavrao Scindia	40

=== Others ===
Party	flag	Symbol	Leader	Seats contested
Bahujan Samaj Party			Mayawati	27
Samajwadi Party			Mulayam Singh Yadav	20

== Result ==
Results of Indian general election, 1999 in Madhya Pradesh
Parties and coalitions	Seats			Popular vote		
Parties and coalitions	Contested	Won	+/−	Votes	%	±pp
Bharatiya Janata Party	40	29	▼1	1,18,11,850	46.58%	▲0.85%
Indian National Congress	40	11	▲1	1,11,35,161	43.91%	▲4.51%
Bahujan Samaj Party	27	0	-	13,26,558	5.23%	▼3.47%
Samajwadi Party	20	0	-	3,46,848	1.37%	▲0.72%
Gondwana Ganatantra Party	15	0	-	90,931	0.36%	▼0.3%
Independents	116	0	-	2,73,286	1.08%	▼0.24%
Total	40			2,53,56,859		
Invalid votes	3,83,794	1.49				
Votes cast / turnout	2,57,46,824	54.88				
Registered voters	4,69,15,473	100.00				

=== Constituency-wise results ===
Keys: BJP (29) INC (11)

Constituency			Winner				Runner Up				Margin	%
#	Name	Poll %	Candidate	Party	Votes	%	Candidate	Party	Votes	%	Margin	%
1	Morena (SC)	39.74%	Ashok Argal	BJP	2,10,790	42.44	Gopal Das	INC	1,48,564	29.91	62,226	12.53
2	Bhind	51.12%	Ram Lakhan Singh	BJP	2,70,766	40.94	Satyadev Katare	INC	2,17,192	32.84	53,574	8.10
3	Gwalior	48.18%	Jaibhan Pawaiya	BJP	2,54,486	41.27	Chandra Mohan Nagori	INC	1,71,370	27.79	83,116	13.48
4	Guna	53.81%	Madhavrao Scindia	INC	4,43,965	65.34	Rao Deshraj Yadav	BJP	2,29,537	33.78	2,14,428	31.56
5	Sagar (SC)	48.46%	Virendra Khatik	BJP	2,93,357	54.64	Madhavi Chaudhary	INC	2,32,884	43.38	60,473	11.26
6	Khajuraho	54.12%	Satyavrat Chaturvedi	INC	3,35,861	45.77	Akhand Pratap Yadav	BJP	2,54,724	34.71	81,137	11.06
7	Damoh	46.10%	Ramkrishna Kusmaria	BJP	2,46,909	43.78	Tilak Singh Lodhi	INC	2,33,190	41.35	13,719	2.43
8	Satna	52.59%	Ramanand Singh	BJP	2,17,932	35.27	Rajendra Singh	INC	2,14,527	34.72	3,405	0.55
9	Rewa	54.64%	Sundar Lal Tiwari	INC	2,75,115	37.19	Ramalakhan Singh Patel	BSP	2,10,964	28.52	64,151	8.67
10	Sidhi (ST)	48.70%	Chandra Pratap Singh	BJP	2,64,981	43.66	Tilakraj Singh	INC	2,60,126	42.86	4,855	0.80
11	Shahdol (ST)	49.76%	Dalpat Paraste	BJP	2,62,229	44.92	Ajit Jogi	INC	2,42,328	41.51	19,901	3.41
12	Surguja (ST)	54.31%	Khelsai Singh	INC	2,97,778	51.31	Larang Sai	BJP	2,36,352	40.73	61,426	10.58
13	Raigarh (ST)	59.39%	Vishnu Deo Sai	BJP	2,76,244	48.46	Pushpa Devi Singh	INC	2,70,471	47.45	5,773	1.01
14	Janjgir	54.08%	Charan Das Mahant	INC	2,78,931	41.98	Banshilal Mahto	BJP	2,64,698	39.84	14,233	2.14
15	Bilaspur (SC)	48.27%	Punnulal Mohle	BJP	2,74,860	52.27	Rameshwar Kosariya	INC	1,99,527	37.95	75,333	14.32
16	Sarangarh (SC)	63.05%	P. R. Khute	BJP	2,81,769	41.75	Paras Ram Bhardwaj	INC	2,30,010	34.08	51,759	7.67
17	Raipur	56.86%	Ramesh Bais	BJP	3,54,736	53.67	Jugal Kishore Sahu	INC	2,74,676	41.56	80,060	12.11
18	Mahasamund	64.59%	Shyama Charan Shukla	INC	3,40,635	49.94	Chandra Shekhar Sahu	BJP	3,25,200	47.68	15,435	2.26
19	Kanker (ST)	56.54%	Sohan Potai	BJP	3,18,040	55.40	Chhabila Arvind Netam	INC	2,29,849	40.04	88,191	15.36
20	Bastar (ST)	39.35%	Baliram Kashyap	BJP	1,55,421	43.58	Mahendra Karma	INC	1,34,684	37.77	20,737	5.81
21	Durg	58.06%	Tara Chand Sahu	BJP	3,89,777	51.24	Pradeep Choubey	INC	3,45,259	45.39	44,518	5.85
22	Rajnandgaon	59.37%	Dr. Raman	BJP	3,04,611	51.46	Motilal Vora	INC	2,77,896	46.94	26,715	4.52
23	Balaghat	63.71%	Prahladsingh Patel	BJP	2,51,308	43.47	Vishweshwer Bhagat	INC	2,30,630	39.90	20,678	3.57
24	Mandla (ST)	49.35%	Faggan Singh Kulaste	BJP	2,32,042	48.11	Devendra Tekam	INC	2,25,470	46.75	6,572	1.36
25	Jabalpur	43.00%	Jaishree Banerjee	BJP	3,00,648	56.88	Chandra Mohan	INC	1,90,894	36.12	1,09,754	20.76
26	Seoni	53.58%	Ram Naresh Tripathi	BJP	2,82,891	48.23	Vimla Verma	INC	2,66,957	45.51	15,934	2.72
27	Chhindwara	60.31%	Kamal Nath	INC	3,99,904	63.98	Santosh Jain	BJP	2,10,976	33.75	1,88,928	30.23
28	Betul	53.51%	Vijay Kumar Khandelwal	BJP	2,72,512	51.03	Gufran Bhai	INC	2,08,040	38.95	64,472	12.08
29	Hoshangabad	59.58%	Sundar Lal Patwa	BJP	3,53,760	52.30	Rajkumar Patel	INC	3,09,313	45.73	44,447	6.57
30	Bhopal	61.88%	Uma Bharti	BJP	5,37,905	55.09	Suresh Pachori	INC	3,69,041	37.79	1,68,864	17.30
31	Vidisha	55.96%	Shivraj Singh	BJP	3,60,421	55.65	Jasvant Singh	INC	2,78,024	42.93	82,397	12.72
32	Rajgarh	60.41%	Laxman Singh	INC	3,54,234	53.34	Nitish Bhardwaj	BJP	2,88,541	43.44	65,693	9.90
33	Shajapur (SC)	63.70%	Thavarchand Gehlot	BJP	3,87,607	51.44	Radhakishan Malviya	INC	3,52,941	46.84	34,666	4.60
34	Khandwa	56.85%	Nandkumarsingh Chouhan	BJP	3,64,161	58.67	Tanvant Singh Keer	INC	2,38,058	38.35	1,26,103	20.32
35	Khargone	60.42%	Tarachand Patel	INC	3,54,133	51.63	Balkrishna Bauji Patidar	BJP	3,15,987	46.07	38,146	5.56
36	Dhar (ST)	60.39%	Gajendra Singh Rajukhedi	INC	3,55,482	52.08	Harsh Chouhan	BJP	3,21,377	47.08	34,105	5.00
37	Indore	56.46%	Sumitra Mahajan	BJP	4,74,167	57.42	Mahesh Joshi	INC	3,42,852	41.52	1,31,315	15.90
38	Ujjain (SC)	60.82%	Dr. Satyanarayan Jatiya	BJP	3,60,103	54.22	Tulasiram Silawat	INC	2,92,065	43.98	68,038	10.24
39	Jhabua (ST)	55.77%	Kantilal Bhuriya	INC	3,71,842	61.93	Dilipsingh Bhuriya	BJP	2,22,465	37.05	1,49,377	24.88
40	Mandsaur	60.65%	Lakshaminarayan Pandey	BJP	3,95,928	53.12	Rajendra Singh Gautam	INC	3,40,443	45.67	55,485	7.45

== Post-election Union Council of Ministers from Madhya Pradesh ==
#	Name	Constituency	Designation	Department	From	To	Party
1	Sundar Lal Patwa	Hoshangabad	Cabinet Minister	Rural Development	13 Oct 1999	30 Sep 2000	BJP
1	Sundar Lal Patwa	Hoshangabad	Cabinet Minister	Chemicals and Fertilizers	30 Sep 2000	7 Nov 2000	BJP
1	Sundar Lal Patwa	Hoshangabad	Cabinet Minister	Mines	7 Nov 2000	1 Sep 2001	BJP
1	Sundar Lal Patwa	Hoshangabad	Cabinet Minister	Agriculture	6 March 2001	27 May 2001	BJP
2	Satyanarayan Jatiya	Ujjain (SC)	Cabinet Minister	Urban Employment and Poverty Alleviation	13 Oct 1999	22 Nov 1999	BJP
2	Satyanarayan Jatiya	Ujjain (SC)	Cabinet Minister	Labour	22 Nov 1999	1 Sep 2001	BJP
2	Satyanarayan Jatiya	Ujjain (SC)	Cabinet Minister	Social Justice and Empowerment	1 Sep 2001	22 May 2004	BJP
3	Uma Bharti	Bhopal	MoS (I/C)	Tourism	13 Oct 1999	2 Feb 2000	BJP
3	Uma Bharti	Bhopal	Cabinet Minister	Youth Affairs and Sports	7 Nov 2000	26 Aug 2002	BJP
3	Uma Bharti	Bhopal	Cabinet Minister	Coal	26 Aug 2002	29 Jan 2003	BJP
3	Uma Bharti	Bhopal	Cabinet Minister	Mines	26 Aug 2002	29 Jan 2003	BJP
4	Vikram Verma	Rajya Sabha (Madhya Pradesh)	Cabinet Minister	Statistics and Programme Implementation	18 Nov 2001	1 July 2002	BJP
4	Vikram Verma	Rajya Sabha (Madhya Pradesh)	Cabinet Minister	Youth Affairs and Sports	26 Aug 2002	22 May 2004	BJP
5	O. Rajagopal	Rajya Sabha (Madhya Pradesh)	MoS	Law, Justice and Company Affairs	13 Oct 1999	24 July 2000	BJP
5	O. Rajagopal	Rajya Sabha (Madhya Pradesh)	MoS	Parliamentary Affairs	22 Nov 1999	22 May 2004	BJP
5	O. Rajagopal	Rajya Sabha (Madhya Pradesh)	MoS	Railways	31 Aug 2000	1 July 2002	BJP
5	O. Rajagopal	Rajya Sabha (Madhya Pradesh)	MoS	Urban Development and Poverty Alleviation	1 July 2002	29 Jan 2003	BJP
5	O. Rajagopal	Rajya Sabha (Madhya Pradesh)	MoS	Defence	29 Jan 2003	22 May 2004	BJP
6	Ramesh Bais	Raipur	MoS	Chemicals and Fertilizers	13 Oct 1999	30 Sep 2000	BJP
6	Ramesh Bais	Raipur	MoS	Communications	13 Oct 1999	22 Dec 2001	BJP
6	Ramesh Bais	Raipur	MoS	Information and Broadcasting	30 Sep 2000	29 Jan 2003	BJP
6	Ramesh Bais	Raipur	MoS (I/C)	Mines	29 Jan 2003	9 Jan 2004	BJP
6	Ramesh Bais	Raipur	MoS (I/C)	Environment and Forests	9 Jan 2004	22 May 2004	BJP
7	Sumitra Mahajan	Indore	MoS	Human Resource Development	13 Oct 1999	1 July 2002	BJP
7	Sumitra Mahajan	Indore	MoS	Communications and Information Technology	1 July 2002	24 May 2003	BJP
7	Sumitra Mahajan	Indore	MoS	Petroleum and Natural Gas	24 May 2003	22 May 2004	BJP
8	Faggan Singh Kulaste	Mandla (ST)	MoS	Parliamentary Affairs	13 Oct 1999	22 Nov 1999	BJP
8	Faggan Singh Kulaste	Mandla (ST)	MoS	Tribal Affairs	22 Nov 1999	22 May 2004	BJP
9	Raman Singh	Rajnandgaon	MoS	Commerce and Industry	13 Oct 1999	29 Jan 2003	BJP
10	Prahlad Singh Patel	Balaghat	MoS	Coal	24 May 2003	22 May 2004	BJP
11	Dilip Singh Judeo	Rajya Sabha (Chhattisgarh)	MoS	Environment and Forests	29 Jan 2003	17 Nov 2003	BJP
