= Chaudhary Mukesh Singh Chaturvedi =

Indian politician

Member of the Madhya Pradesh Legislative Assembly
- In office 2013–2018

Personal details
- Born: 15 March 1967 (age 59) Bhind, Madhya Pradesh, India
- Party: Bharatiya Janata Party
- Parent: Chaudhary Dilip Singh Chaturvedi
- Education: The Scindia School, Fort,Gwalior; Bhopal School of sciences (BA Management); Barkatullah University, Bhopal (LL.B.)
- Profession: Politician

Chaudhary Mukesh Singh Chaturvedi (born 15 March 1967) is an Indian politician belonging to the Bhartiya Janta Party predominantly working in Madhya Pradesh. He is currently serving as the state vice president for Bharatiya Janata Party, Madhya Pradesh since January 2021 and is in-charge of Sagar Division, comprising six districts. Chaudhary, a prominent figure in the Chambal division, represented Mehgaon Constituency in the 14th Madhya Pradesh Legislative Assembly and prior to that, he had served as the Chairman of Bhind Nagar Palika Parishad between the years 1999–2004.

== Early life ==
Chaudhary was born on 15 March 1967 to Chaudhary Dilip Singh Chaturvedi and Smt. Sharda Devi Chaturvedi in Bhind, Madhya Pradesh. He completed his primary education from The Scindia School, Fort, Gwalior and was a member of the school Cricket, Hockey and Football Teams. He graduated in BA Management in 1988 from the Bhopal School of Sciences before pursuing his Bachelor of Law (LL.B) from the Barkatullah University, Bhopal. His father, Chaudhary Dilip Singh Chaturvedi was a Member of Madhya Pradesh Legislative Assembly from BJP representing Bhind Assembly constituency following the 1980 elections; and as the President of University of Lucknow's Students Union, 1955–56, he led the Indian delegation to the historic Afro-Asian Students Conference held at Bandung, Indonesia in 1956. The hereditary title of Chaudhary – recognising the tutelary lordship, was conferred on his great-grandfather by the then King of Jaipur Estate. His elder brother, Chaudhary Rakesh Singh Chaturvedi, is a leader with the Indian National Congress party and has represented the Bhind Assembly constituency and has been a four-time Member of the Madhya Pradesh Legislative Assembly since 1990 which includes a tenure as a cabinet minister between 1998 and 2003 and deputy leader of opposition in 2008–2013. Chaudhary, along with his brother, runs various educational institutions as part of their father's legacy and strive to provide better access and easy availability of academic resources to the people of Chambal division. His father established the first all-girls school in the division.

== Political background ==
Chaudhary began his political career as a student leader in Bhopal when he was first elected as the State Joint Secretary of National Students' Union of India, Madhya Pradesh in 1987–88. Growing in ranks, he was soon made the State General Secretary, NSUI, MP from 1989 to 1990 and later served as State General Secretary of the Indian Youth Congress between 1998 and 2000. He supported his father, Chaudhary Dilip Singh Chaturvedi in his State Assembly Election from Bhind Assembly constituency in 1980, same year when the party was formed and later supported his brother in winning State Assembly Elections since 1990. He was elected as the Chairman of Bhind Nagar Palika Parishad from Bhartiya Janta Party and brought revolutionary reforms involving the transparency and efficiency of the Parishad. In 2013, Chaudhary returned to the Bhartiya Janta Party under the tutelage of Shri Atal Bihari Vajpayee along with his elder brother Chaudhary Rakesh Singh Chaturvedi. He successfully contested as a Bhartiya Janta Party candidate from the Mehgaon Constituency and represented his constituency in the 14th Madhya Pradesh State Legislative Assembly between 2013 and 2018. For his exemplary and selfless work in the 2020 by-elections for Mehgaon Vidhan Sabha, on 13 January 2021, Chaudhary was appointed the State Vice President of Bhartiya Janta Party under the Presidency of VD Sharma.
