= 1999 Indian general election =

- 5 September–3 October 1999

543 of the 545 seats in the Lok Sabha (Note: Two seats were reserved for Anglo-Indians and filled by presidential nomination) 272 seats needed for a majority
- Registered: 619,536,847
- Turnout: 59.99% (▼1.98pp)
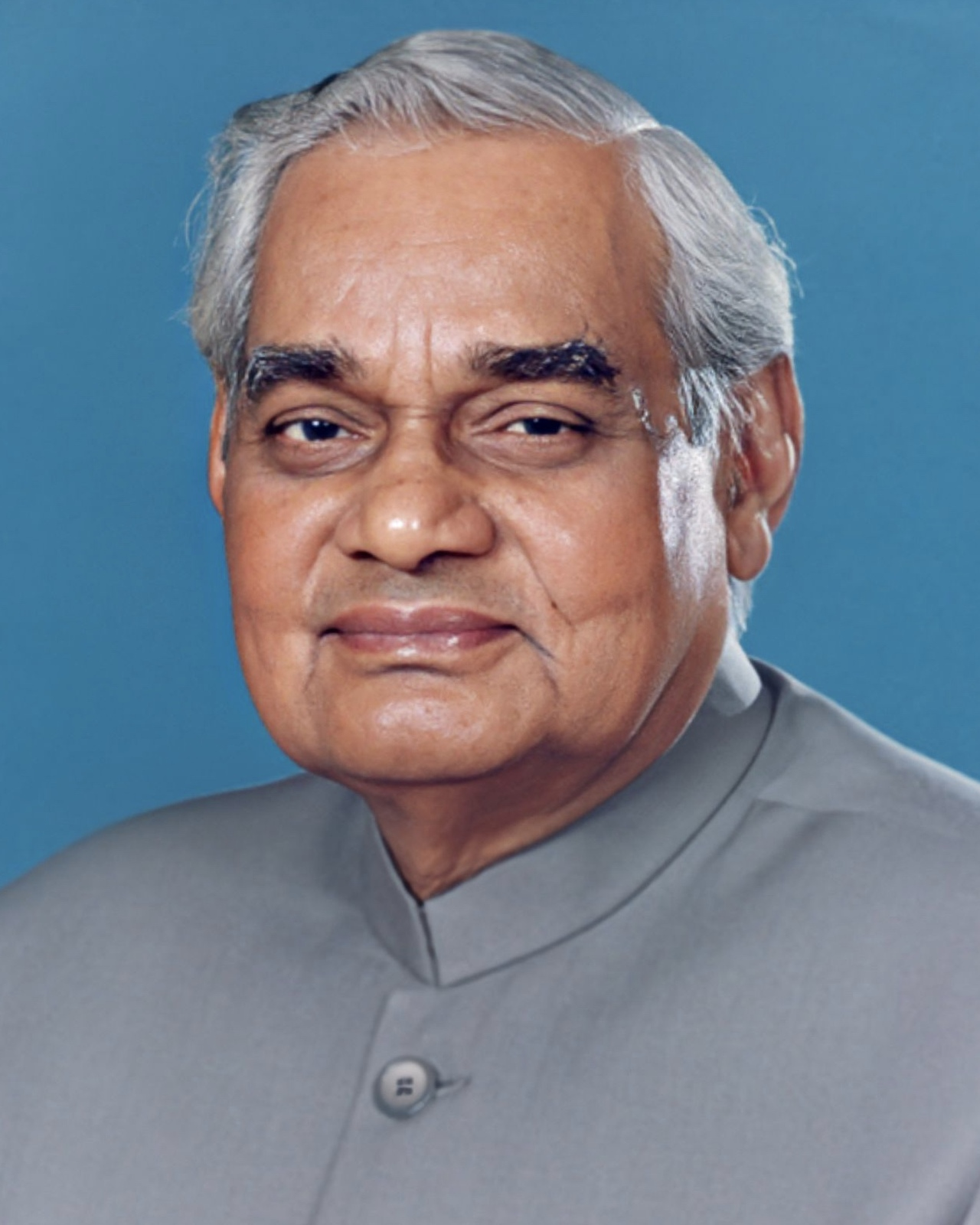

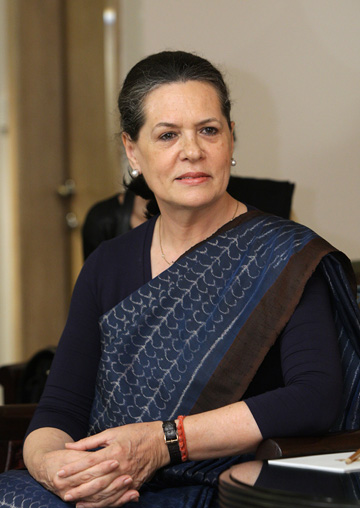

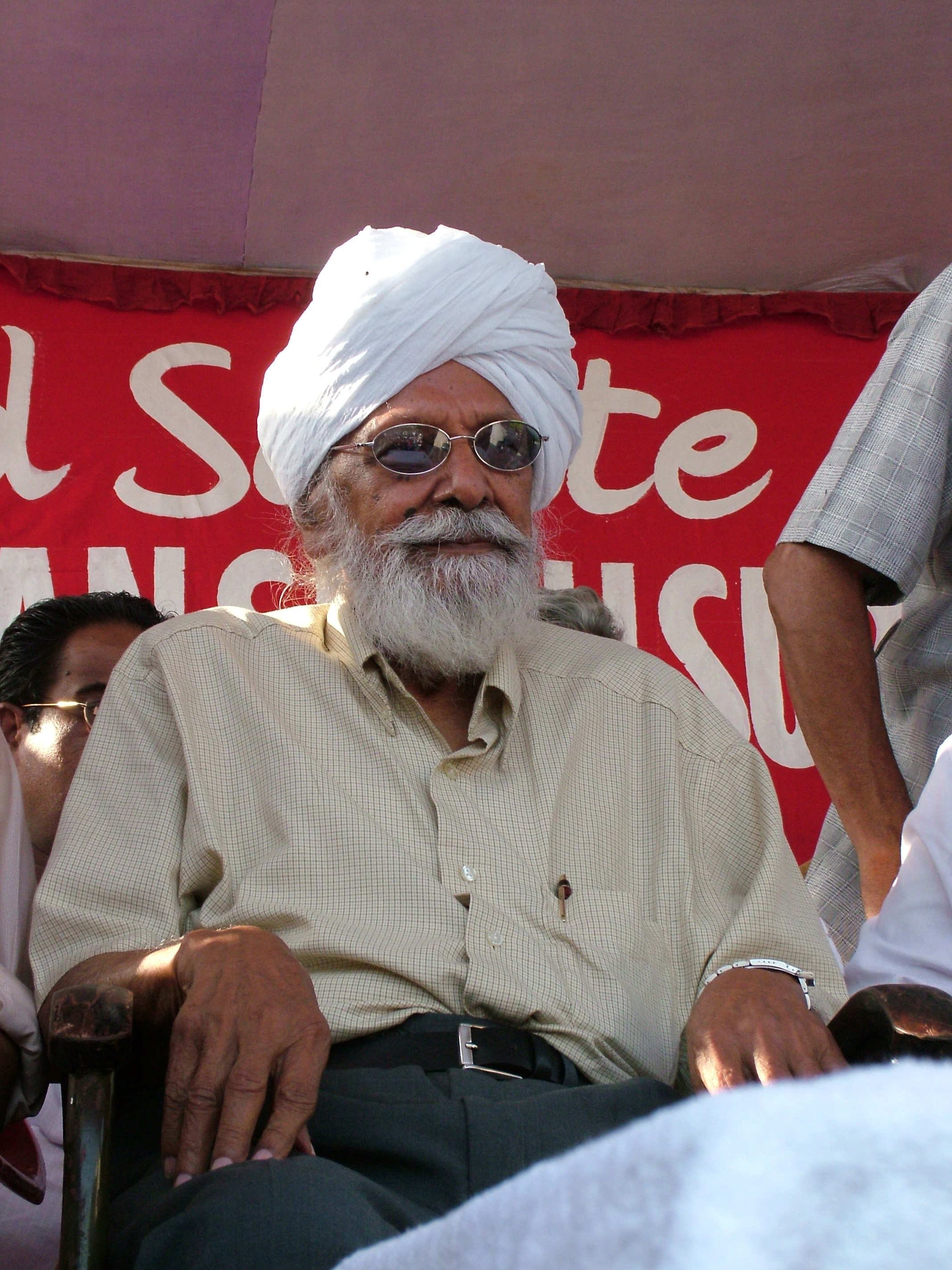
	First party	Second party	Third party
Leader	Atal Bihari Vajpayee	Sonia Gandhi	Harkishan Singh Surjeet
Party	BJP	INC	CPI(M)
Alliance	NDA	INC+	LF
Last election	25.59%, 182 seats	25.82%, 141 seats	5.16%, 32 seats
Seats won	182	114	33
Seat change	Steady	▼27	▲1
Popular vote	86,562,209	103,120,330	19,695,767
Percentage	23.75%	28.30%	5.40%
Swing	▼1.84pp	▲2.48pp	▲0.24pp
Alliance seats	299	137	107
- Results by constituency
Prime Minister before election
Atal Bihari Vajpayee
BJP
Prime Minister after election
Atal Bihari Vajpayee
BJP

General elections were held in India between 5 September and 3 October 1999, a few months after the Kargil War. Results were announced on 6 October 1999.

The elections saw the National Democratic Alliance led by the Bharatiya Janata Party win a majority in the Lok Sabha, the first time since 1984 that a party or alliance had won an outright majority and the second since the 1977 elections that a non-Congress coalition had done so. It was also the third consecutive election in which the party that won the most votes overall did not win the most seats. The elections gave Atal Bihari Vajpayee the record of being the first non-Congress Prime Minister to serve a full five-year term. The decisive result also ended the political instability the country had seen since the 1996 elections that had resulted in a hung parliament. Although the Indian National Congress was able to increase its vote share, its 114 seat tally was considered to be its worst-ever performance in a general election in terms of the number of seats obtained until the 2014 general elections.

== Background ==
=== 1999 Lok Sabha vote of confidence ===
On 17 April 1999 the Bharatiya Janata Party (BJP) coalition government led by prime minister Atal Bihari Vajpayee failed to win a confidence vote in the Lok Sabha (India's lower house) by a single vote due to the withdrawal of one of the government's coalition partners – the All India Anna Dravida Munnetra Kazhagam (AIADMK). The general secretary of the AIADMK J. Jayalalithaa, had consistently threatened to withdraw support from the ruling coalition if certain demands were not met, in particular the sacking of the Tamil Nadu government, control of which she had lost three years prior to her arch rival M. Karunanidhi. The BJP accused Jayalalithaa of making the demands in order to avoid standing trial for a series of corruption charges, and no agreement between the parties could be reached leading to the government's defeat.

Sonia Gandhi, as leader of the opposition and largest opposition party (Indian National Congress), was unable to form a coalition of parties large enough to secure a working majority in the Lok Sabha. Neither Mulayam Singh nor Jayalalithaa supported Gandhi, instead Jayalalithaa proposed West Bengal chief minister Jyoti Basu for prime minister; he also declined the position. Thus shortly after the no confidence motion, President K. R. Narayanan dissolved the Parliament and called fresh elections. Atal Bihari Vajpayee remained caretaker prime minister till the elections were held later that year.

== Election schedule ==
The polling schedule for the 1999 general elections was announced by the Chief Election Commissioner M. S. Gill on 11 July 1999. It was revised on 3 August 1999. The revised schedule is given below.

Poll event	Phase						
Poll event	I	II	II (A) (Note: 2 (A) phase for only Kerala.)	III	IV	V	V (A) (Note: 5 (A) phase for only second phase of Odisha.)
Notification date	11 August 1999	17 August 1999	12 August 1999	21 August 1999	30 August 1999	7 September 1999	3 September 1999
Last date for filing nomination	18 August 1999	24 August 1999	19 August 1999	28 August 1999	6 September 1999	14 September 1999	10 September 1999
Scrutiny of nomination	19 August 1999	25 August 1999	20 August 1999	30 August 1999	7 September 1999	15 September 1999	
Last Date for withdrawal of nomination	21 August 1999	27 August 1999	23 August 1999	1 September 1999	9 September 1999	17 September 1999	
Date of poll	5 September 1999	11 September 1999		18 September 1999	25 September 1999	3 October 1999	
Date of counting of votes/Result	6 October 1999						
No. of constituencies	146	124		79	72	122	

=== State-wise polling schedule ===
Phase-wise polling constituencies across states and union territories
State / Union territory	Total seats	Election dates and number of constituencies				
State / Union territory	Total seats	Phase 1	Phase 2	Phase 3	Phase 4	Phase 5
State / Union territory	Total seats	5 September	11 September	18 September	25 September	3 October
Andhra Pradesh	42	13	15	14	—	—
Arunachal Pradesh	2	—	—	—	—	2
Assam	14	—	—	—	—	14
Bihar	54	—	—	19	19	16
Goa	2	2	—	—	—	—
Gujarat	26	26	—	—	—	—
Haryana	10	10	—	—	—	—
Himachal Pradesh	4	—	—	—	4	—
Jammu and Kashmir	6	2	2	2	—	—
Karnataka	28	15	13	—	—	—
Kerala	20	—	20	—	—	—
Madhya Pradesh	40	—	14	14	12	—
Maharashtra	48	24	24	—	—	—
Manipur	2	—	—	—	1	1
Meghalaya	2	—	—	—	—	2
Mizoram	1	—	—	—	1	—
Nagaland	1	—	—	—	1	—
Odisha	21	—	—	—	10	11
Punjab	13	13	—	—	—	—
Rajasthan	25	10	15	—	—	—
Sikkim	1	—	—	—	—	1
Tamil Nadu	39	19	20	—	—	—
Tripura	2	—	—	—	—	2
Uttar Pradesh	85	—	—	30	24	31
West Bengal	42	—	—	—	—	42
Andaman and Nicobar Islands	1	1	—	—	—	—
Chandigarh	1	1	—	—	—	—
Dadra and Nagar Haveli	1	1	—	—	—	—
Daman and Diu	1	1	—	—	—	—
Delhi	7	7	—	—	—	—
Lakshadweep	1	1	—	—	—	—
Puducherry	1	1	—	—	—	—
Total constituencies polling on this day	543	146	124	79	72	122
Total states / UTs polling on this day	32	16	9	5	8	10
Cumulative constituencies completed	543	146	270	349	421	543
Cumulative percentage complete	100%	26%	50%	64%	77%	100%
Phased distribution summary		States and UTs		Constituencies		
States and UTs polling in a single phase		21		219		
States and UTs polling in two phases		6		198		
States and UTs polling in three phases		5		120		
Total aggregate		32 states/UTs		543 constituencies		

== Campaign ==
The incumbent Hindu right-wing Bharatiya Janata Party (BJP) went into the election as the head of the National Democratic Alliance (NDA), a coalition of over 20 parties. Several other parties in the election not part of the NDA also committed themselves to supporting a BJP led government on matters of confidence.

The main opposition league was led by Sonia Gandhi's Indian National Congress, the long-traditional centrist dominant party in India. The opposition coalition comprised far fewer parties, and its alliances were generally weaker than those of the NDA. A so-called "third front" of left-wing, socialist and communist parties was also present, although this was not a strong electoral alliance so much as a loose grouping of parties that shared similar ideological viewpoints and had some inter-party co-operation. There were also nearly one thousand candidates of unaffiliated parties, independent candidates and parties who were unwilling to take part in coalitions that stood in the election.

The campaign coalesced around a few key issues. Sonia Gandhi was a relative newcomer to the INC (having been elected to the presidency in 1998) and her leadership had recently been challenged by Marathi INC leader Sharad Pawar, on the grounds of her Italian birth. This led to an underlying crisis within the INC that persisted during the election and was capitalised upon by the BJP, which contrasted the "videsi" (foreign) Gandhi versus the "swadesi" (home-grown) Vajpayee.

Another issue running in the BJP's favour was the generally positive view of Vajpayee's handling of the Kargil War, which had ended a few months earlier and had affirmed and strengthened the Indian position in Kashmir. During the past two years India had posted strong economic growth on the back of economic liberalisation and financial reforms, as well as a low rate of inflation and higher rate of industrial expansion. The BJP campaigned strongly on the back of these achievements, as well as cultivating some sympathy for the predicament which had led to the government's downfall.

Perhaps most decisive though in the BJP's campaign was the solid alliance it had cultivated and the relatively strong performance it was able to deliver on regional and local issues. The 1991, 1996, and 1998 elections saw a period of consistent growth for the BJP and its allies, based primarily on arousing Hindu sentiments around the Ayodhya dispute, which culminated into large-scale Hindu-Muslim riots in the wake of the 1992 demolition of Babri Masjid. It also underwent political expansions in terms of cultivating stronger and broader alliances with other previously unaffiliated parties which were opposed to Congress hegemony but not ideological aligned with the BJP; and regional expansion which saw the NDA become competitive and even the largest vote takers in previously Congress dominated areas such as Orissa, Andhra Pradesh and Assam. These final factors were to prove decisive in the election outcome of 1999.

Voting was conducted over five days. Elections were conducted in 146 seats on the Eastern coast of the country on 5 September, in 123 Central and Southern seats on 11 September, in 76 Northern and Upper-Central seats on 18 September, in 74 North Western seats on 25 September and in the 121 Western seats on 3 October. Despite some fears of voter fatigue, electoral turnout was comparable with previous elections at 60%. Over 5 million election officials conducted the election over 800,000 polling stations, with vote counting commencing on 6 October.

== Results ==
The results in terms of seats were decisively in favour of the BJP and the NDA, with the alliance picking up 299 seats. Despite increasing its popular vote share and receiving the most votes overall, the Congress party lost 23 seats, and its two key regional allies performed worse than expected; however, it did regain ground in some states such as Uttar Pradesh (where it had been wiped out in 1998, not winning a single seat in the state).

The seat result for the Indian National Congress was the worst in nearly half a century, with party leader Sonia Gandhi calling upon the party to take a frank assessment of itself – "the result calls for introspection, frank assessment and determined action. We will attend to this in the coming days. In the meantime, we accept unhesitatingly the verdict of the people". For the BJP, this marked the first occasion where a non-INC party had secured a stable government coalition. Previous non-INC governing coalitions had been formed in 1977, 1989 and 1996; however, none of these administrations had been able to maintain a stable coagulation for more than a couple of years. One Senior BJP figure commented in the aftermath "It will certainly be a government of stability...I expect that Mr Vajpayee, with all his experience, will be able to handle our coalition partners."

Party	Votes	%	Seats
Indian National Congress	103,120,330	28.30	114
Bharatiya Janata Party	86,562,209	23.75	182
Communist Party of India (Marxist)	19,695,767	5.40	33
Bahujan Samaj Party	15,175,845	4.16	14
Samajwadi Party	13,717,021	3.76	26
Telugu Desam Party	13,297,370	3.65	29
Janata Dal (United)	11,282,084	3.10	21
Rashtriya Janata Dal	10,150,492	2.79	7
Trinamool Congress	9,363,785	2.57	8
Nationalist Congress Party	8,260,311	2.27	8
All India Anna Dravida Munnetra Kazhagam	7,046,953	1.93	10
Dravida Munnetra Kazhagam	6,298,832	1.73	12
Shiv Sena	5,672,412	1.56	15
Communist Party of India	5,395,119	1.48	4
Biju Janata Dal	4,378,536	1.20	10
Janata Dal (Secular)	3,332,702	0.91	1
Pattali Makkal Katchi	2,377,741	0.65	5
Shiromani Akali Dal	2,502,949	0.69	2
Tamil Maanila Congress	2,058,636	0.56	0
Indian National Lok Dal	2,002,700	0.55	5
Marumalarchi Dravida Munnetra Kazhagam	1,620,527	0.44	4
Revolutionary Socialist Party	1,500,817	0.41	3
Rashtriya Lok Dal	1,364,030	0.37	2
All India Forward Bloc	1,288,060	0.35	2
Communist Party of India (Marxist–Leninist) Liberation	1,220,698	0.33	1
Asom Gana Parishad	1,182,061	0.32	0
Jharkhand Mukti Morcha	974,609	0.27	0
Muslim League Kerala State Committee	833,562	0.23	2
Akhil Bharatiya Loktantrik Congress	818,713	0.22	2
Bharipa Bahujan Mahasangh	692,559	0.19	1
Apna Dal	848,662	0.23	0
Bihar People's Party	607,810	0.17	0
Puthiya Tamilagam	568,196	0.16	0
Jammu & Kashmir National Conference	454,481	0.12	4
All India Majlis-e-Ittehadul Muslimeen	448,165	0.12	1
MGR Anna Dravida Munnetra Kazhagam	396,216	0.11	1
Kerala Congress	365,313	0.10	1
Kerala Congress (M)	357,402	0.10	1
Shiromani Akali Dal (Simranjit Singh Mann)	298,846	0.08	1
Samajwadi Janata Party (Rashtriya)	297,337	0.08	1
Peasants and Workers Party of India	282,583	0.08	1
Himachal Vikas Congress	264,002	0.07	1
Manipur State Congress Party	222,417	0.06	1
Republican Party of India	505,664	0.14	0
Ajeya Bharat Party	430,275	0.12	0
Sarb Hind Shiromani Akali Dal	406,421	0.11	0
Marxist Co-ordination Committee	351,839	0.10	0
Tamizhaga Rajiv Congress	338,278	0.09	0
United Reservation Movement Council of Assam	246,942	0.07	0
Anna Telugu Desam Party	244,045	0.07	0
Democratic Bahujan Samaj Morcha	236,962	0.07	0
Haryana Vikas Party	188,731	0.05	0
Sikkim Democratic Front	107,828	0.03	1
Gondwana Ganatantra Party	180,804	0.05	0
People's Democratic Front	172,434	0.05	0
Janata Party	167,649	0.05	0
Jharkhand Mukti Morcha (Ulgulan)	154,433	0.04	0
Mahabharat People's Party	145,192	0.04	0
National Loktantrik Party	136,385	0.04	0
Marxist Communist Party of India (S.S. Srivastava)	120,220	0.03	0
United Democratic Party	107,197	0.03	0
Jharkhand Party (Naren)	101,441	0.03	0
Sikkim Sangram Parishad	86,466	0.02	0
Kannada Chalavali Vatal Paksha	73,012	0.02	0
Sadbhavana Party	71,279	0.02	0
Arunachal Congress	70,760	0.02	0
NTR Telugu Desam Party (Lakshmi Parvathi)	61,635	0.02	0
Jharkhand Party	57,676	0.02	0
Champaran Vikas Party	56,561	0.02	0
Akhil Bharatiya Sena	56,249	0.02	0
United Minorities Front, Assam	53,661	0.01	0
Lok Shakti	40,997	0.01	0
Bharatiya Republican Paksha	40,636	0.01	0
Hill State People's Democratic Party	40,301	0.01	0
Bahujan Samaj Party (Ambedkar)	39,494	0.01	0
Pragatisheel Manav Samaj Party	36,920	0.01	0
Bharatiya Jan Congress	34,552	0.01	0
People's Democratic Movement	33,164	0.01	0
Bhartiya Jana Congress (Rashtriya)	32,871	0.01	0
Pyramid Party of India	31,699	0.01	0
Socialist Republican Party	30,779	0.01	0
Federal Party of Manipur	30,039	0.01	0
Jammu and Kashmir Awami League	28,889	0.01	0
Amra Bangali	25,408	0.01	0
Tamil Desiyak Katchi	25,209	0.01	0
Loktantrik Samajwadi Party	23,630	0.01	0
Indian Union Muslim League (IUML)	20,523	0.01	0
Bharatiya Jana Sangh	19,596	0.01	0
National Minorities Party	19,344	0.01	0
Shoshit Samaj Dal	19,330	0.01	0
Jammu and Kashmir National Panthers Party	15,888	0.00	0
Chhattisgarh Mukti Morcha	15,526	0.00	0
Uttarakhand Kranti Dal	14,302	0.00	0
Akhil Bharat Hindu Mahasabha	14,157	0.00	0
Republican Party of India (Athawale)	14,098	0.00	0
Majlis Bachao Tahreek	13,461	0.00	0
Sirpanch Samaj Party	13,437	0.00	0
Chhattisgarhi Samaj Party	13,097	0.00	0
Parivartan Samaj Party	12,820	0.00	0
United Goans Democratic Party	11,153	0.00	0
Jan Satta Party	11,024	0.00	0
Savarn Samaj Party	10,906	0.00	0
All India Muslim Forum	10,010	0.00	0
Maraland Democratic Front	8,444	0.00	0
United Tribal Nationalists Liberation Front	8,429	0.00	0
United Bodo Nationalist Liberation Front	7,611	0.00	0
Bharatiya Samaj Dal	7,607	0.00	0
Ambedkar Samaj Party	7,260	0.00	0
Akhil Bharatiya Berozgaar Party	7,134	0.00	0
Akhil Bartiya Manav Seva Dal	6,761	0.00	0
Rajasthan Vikash Party	6,258	0.00	0
Awami Party	5,050	0.00	0
All India Gareeb Congress	4,861	0.00	0
Gareebjan Samaj Party	4,725	0.00	0
Garo National Council	4,561	0.00	0
Humanist Party of India	4,192	0.00	0
Rashtriya Unnatsheel Das	4,104	0.00	0
Shoshit Samaj Party	4,080	0.00	0
Bharatiya Naujawan Dal	3,895	0.00	0
Dhiravida Thelgar Munnetra Kalagam	3,748	0.00	0
Maharashtra Rashtravadi Congress	3,579	0.00	0
Maharashtra Pradesh Krantikari Party	3,571	0.00	0
Bira Oriya Party	3,120	0.00	0
Bahujan Kranti Dal (JAI)	3,090	0.00	0
All India Rajiv Krantikari Congress	2,993	0.00	0
Sanatan Samaj Party	2,932	0.00	0
Bhartiya Lok Kalyan Dal	2,896	0.00	0
Bharatiya Berozgar Mazdoor Kisan Dal	2,706	0.00	0
Tharasu Makkal Mandram	2,675	0.00	0
Gujarat Yuva Vikas Party	2,217	0.00	0
Bharatiya Minorities Suraksha Mahasangh	2,151	0.00	0
Akhil Bhartiya Janata Vikas Party	1,981	0.00	0
Bharat Dal	1,832	0.00	0
Hind Vikas Party	1,641	0.00	0
Tamil Nadu Peasants and Workers Party	1,631	0.00	0
Ephraim Union	1,578	0.00	0
National Organisation Congress	1,566	0.00	0
Manav Kalyan Sangh Dal	1,517	0.00	0
Revolutionary Communist Party of India (Rasik Bhatt)	1,516	0.00	0
All J & K Peoples Patriotic Front	1,500	0.00	0
Kamjor Varg Sangh, Bihar	1,481	0.00	0
United Citizens Party	1,414	0.00	0
Rashtriya Sawarn Dal	1,407	0.00	0
Goa Vikas Party	1,407	0.00	0
Akhil Bharatiya Manav Adhikar Dal	1,333	0.00	0
Akhil Bhartiya Loktantra Party	1,265	0.00	0
Labour and Job Seeker's Party of India	1,227	0.00	0
Bahujan Kranti Dal	1,218	0.00	0
Secular Party of India	1,180	0.00	0
Rashtriya Aikta Manch	1,169	0.00	0
Gandhiwadi Rashtriya Congress	1,163	0.00	0
Pragati Sheel Party	858	0.00	0
Bharat Nav Jyoti Sangh	806	0.00	0
All India Minorities Front	805	0.00	0
Bahujan Ekta Party (R)	783	0.00	0
Bharatiya Momin Front	737	0.00	0
Indian National Green Party	594	0.00	0
Bharatiya Jan Vikas Party	571	0.00	0
Ambedkarbadi Party	543	0.00	0
Bharatiya Parivartan Morcha	508	0.00	0
Rashtriya Mazdoor Ekta Party	437	0.00	0
Christian Mannetra Kazhagam	385	0.00	0
Bharatha Makkal Congress	384	0.00	0
Rashtriya Dharmanirpeksha Nava Bharat Party	384	0.00	0
Kranti Dal	344	0.00	0
Bharatiya Muhabbat Party (All India)	338	0.00	0
Akhil Bharatiya Shivsena Rashtrawadi	244	0.00	0
National Congress Of Youth	179	0.00	0
Desh Bhakt Party	173	0.00	0
Independents	9,996,386	2.74	6
Nominated Anglo-Indians			2
Total	364,437,294	100.00	545
Valid votes	364,437,294	98.05	
Invalid/blank votes	7,231,810	1.95	
Total votes	371,669,104	100.00	
Registered voters/turnout	619,536,847	59.99	
Source: ECI

=== Results by Region ===
Region	States	Total Seats	Party	Won	Change
Northern	Jammu & Kashmir (6); Himachal Pradesh (4); Haryana (10); Punjab (13); Uttar Pradesh (85)	118	Bharatiya Janata Party	40	▼26
Northern	Jammu & Kashmir (6); Himachal Pradesh (4); Haryana (10); Punjab (13); Uttar Pradesh (85)	118	Samajwadi Party	26	▲6
Northern	Jammu & Kashmir (6); Himachal Pradesh (4); Haryana (10); Punjab (13); Uttar Pradesh (85)	118	Indian National Congress	18	▲13
Northern	Jammu & Kashmir (6); Himachal Pradesh (4); Haryana (10); Punjab (13); Uttar Pradesh (85)	118	Bahujan Samaj Party	14	▲9
Northern	Jammu & Kashmir (6); Himachal Pradesh (4); Haryana (10); Punjab (13); Uttar Pradesh (85)	118	Indian National Lok Dal	5	New
Northern	Jammu & Kashmir (6); Himachal Pradesh (4); Haryana (10); Punjab (13); Uttar Pradesh (85)	118	Jammu & Kashmir National Conference	4	▲1
Northern	Jammu & Kashmir (6); Himachal Pradesh (4); Haryana (10); Punjab (13); Uttar Pradesh (85)	118	Shiromani Akali Dal	2	▼6
Northern	Jammu & Kashmir (6); Himachal Pradesh (4); Haryana (10); Punjab (13); Uttar Pradesh (85)	118	Akhil Bharatiya Lok Tantrik Congress	2	New
Northern	Jammu & Kashmir (6); Himachal Pradesh (4); Haryana (10); Punjab (13); Uttar Pradesh (85)	118	Rashtriya Lok Dal	2	New
Northern	Jammu & Kashmir (6); Himachal Pradesh (4); Haryana (10); Punjab (13); Uttar Pradesh (85)	118	Himachal Vikas Congress	1	▲1
Northern	Jammu & Kashmir (6); Himachal Pradesh (4); Haryana (10); Punjab (13); Uttar Pradesh (85)	118	Samajwadi Janata Party	1	Steady
Northern	Jammu & Kashmir (6); Himachal Pradesh (4); Haryana (10); Punjab (13); Uttar Pradesh (85)	118	Communist Party of India	1	▲1
Northern	Jammu & Kashmir (6); Himachal Pradesh (4); Haryana (10); Punjab (13); Uttar Pradesh (85)	118	Independent politician	1	Steady
Northern	Jammu & Kashmir (6); Himachal Pradesh (4); Haryana (10); Punjab (13); Uttar Pradesh (85)	118	Shiromani Akali Dal	1	New
Western	Rajasthan (25); Gujarat (26); Maharashtra (48); Goa (2)	101	Bharatiya Janata Party	51	▲23
Western	Rajasthan (25); Gujarat (26); Maharashtra (48); Goa (2)	101	Indian National Congress	25	▼35
Western	Rajasthan (25); Gujarat (26); Maharashtra (48); Goa (2)	101	Shiv Sena	15	▲9
Western	Rajasthan (25); Gujarat (26); Maharashtra (48); Goa (2)	101	Nationalist Congress Party	6	New
Western	Rajasthan (25); Gujarat (26); Maharashtra (48); Goa (2)	101	Bharipa Bahujan Mahasangh	1	New
Western	Rajasthan (25); Gujarat (26); Maharashtra (48); Goa (2)	101	Janata Dal	1	New
Western	Rajasthan (25); Gujarat (26); Maharashtra (48); Goa (2)	101	Peasants And Workers Party of India	1	Steady
Western	Rajasthan (25); Gujarat (26); Maharashtra (48); Goa (2)	101	Independent politician	1	Steady
Central	Madhya Pradesh (40)	40	Bharatiya Janata Party	29	▼1
Central	Madhya Pradesh (40)	40	Indian National Congress	11	▲1
Southern	Karnataka (28); Andhra Pradesh (42); Tamil Nadu (39); Kerala (20)	129	Indian National Congress	33	▼6
Southern	Karnataka (28); Andhra Pradesh (42); Tamil Nadu (39); Kerala (20)	129	Telugu Desam Party	29	▲17
Southern	Karnataka (28); Andhra Pradesh (42); Tamil Nadu (39); Kerala (20)	129	Bharatiya Janata Party	18	▼2
Southern	Karnataka (28); Andhra Pradesh (42); Tamil Nadu (39); Kerala (20)	129	Dravida Munnetra Kazhagam	12	▲8
Southern	Karnataka (28); Andhra Pradesh (42); Tamil Nadu (39); Kerala (20)	129	All India Anna Dravida Munnetra Kazhagam	10	▼8
Southern	Karnataka (28); Andhra Pradesh (42); Tamil Nadu (39); Kerala (20)	129	Communist Party of India	9	▲3
Southern	Karnataka (28); Andhra Pradesh (42); Tamil Nadu (39); Kerala (20)	129	Pattali Makkal Katchi	5	▲1
Southern	Karnataka (28); Andhra Pradesh (42); Tamil Nadu (39); Kerala (20)	129	Marumalarchi Dravida Munnetra Kazhagam	4	▲1
Southern	Karnataka (28); Andhra Pradesh (42); Tamil Nadu (39); Kerala (20)	129	Janata Dal	3	Steady
Southern	Karnataka (28); Andhra Pradesh (42); Tamil Nadu (39); Kerala (20)	129	Muslim League Kerala State Committee	2	Steady
Southern	Karnataka (28); Andhra Pradesh (42); Tamil Nadu (39); Kerala (20)	129	Kerala Congress	2	▲1
Southern	Karnataka (28); Andhra Pradesh (42); Tamil Nadu (39); Kerala (20)	129	MGR Anna Dravida Munnetra Kazhagam	1	▲1
Southern	Karnataka (28); Andhra Pradesh (42); Tamil Nadu (39); Kerala (20)	129	All India Majlis-e-Ittehadul Muslimeen	1	Steady
Eastern	Bihar (54); Odisha (21); West Bengal (42)	117	Bharatiya Janata Party	34	▲6
Eastern	Bihar (54); Odisha (21); West Bengal (42)	117	Communist Party of India	22	▼2
Eastern	Bihar (54); Odisha (21); West Bengal (42)	117	Janata Dal	18	New
Eastern	Bihar (54); Odisha (21); West Bengal (42)	117	Biju Janata Dal	10	▲1
Eastern	Bihar (54); Odisha (21); West Bengal (42)	117	Indian National Congress	9	▼2
Eastern	Bihar (54); Odisha (21); West Bengal (42)	117	All India Trinamool Congress	8	▲1
Eastern	Bihar (54); Odisha (21); West Bengal (42)	117	Rashtriya Janata Dal	7	▼10
Eastern	Bihar (54); Odisha (21); West Bengal (42)	117	Communist Party of India	3	Steady
Eastern	Bihar (54); Odisha (21); West Bengal (42)	117	Revolutionary Socialist Party	3	▼1
Eastern	Bihar (54); Odisha (21); West Bengal (42)	117	All India Forward Bloc	2	Steady
Eastern	Bihar (54); Odisha (21); West Bengal (42)	117	Independent politician	1	▲1
North-East	Assam (14); Arunachal Pradesh (2); Meghalaya (2); Manipur (2); Mizoram (1); Nagaland(1); Sikkim (1); Tripura (2)	25	Indian National Congress	14	▼1
North-East	Assam (14); Arunachal Pradesh (2); Meghalaya (2); Manipur (2); Mizoram (1); Nagaland(1); Sikkim (1); Tripura (2)	25	Bharatiya Janata Party	2	▲1
North-East	Assam (14); Arunachal Pradesh (2); Meghalaya (2); Manipur (2); Mizoram (1); Nagaland(1); Sikkim (1); Tripura (2)	25	Nationalist Congress Party	2	▲2
North-East	Assam (14); Arunachal Pradesh (2); Meghalaya (2); Manipur (2); Mizoram (1); Nagaland(1); Sikkim (1); Tripura (2)	25	Communist Party of India	2	Steady
North-East	Assam (14); Arunachal Pradesh (2); Meghalaya (2); Manipur (2); Mizoram (1); Nagaland(1); Sikkim (1); Tripura (2)	25	Communist Party of India (Marxist–Leninist) Liberation	1	New
North-East	Assam (14); Arunachal Pradesh (2); Meghalaya (2); Manipur (2); Mizoram (1); Nagaland(1); Sikkim (1); Tripura (2)	25	Manipur State Congress Party	1	Steady
North-East	Assam (14); Arunachal Pradesh (2); Meghalaya (2); Manipur (2); Mizoram (1); Nagaland(1); Sikkim (1); Tripura (2)	25	Sikkim Democratic Front	1	Steady
North-East	Assam (14); Arunachal Pradesh (2); Meghalaya (2); Manipur (2); Mizoram (1); Nagaland(1); Sikkim (1); Tripura (2)	25	Independent politician	2	Steady
Union Territories	Chandigarh (1); Delhi (7); Dadra & Nagar Haveli (1); Daman & Diu (1); Lakshadweep (1); Puducherry (1); Andaman & Nicobar (1)	13	Bharatiya Janata Party	8	▼1
Union Territories	Chandigarh (1); Delhi (7); Dadra & Nagar Haveli (1); Daman & Diu (1); Lakshadweep (1); Puducherry (1); Andaman & Nicobar (1)	13	Indian National Congress	4	▲1
Union Territories	Chandigarh (1); Delhi (7); Dadra & Nagar Haveli (1); Daman & Diu (1); Lakshadweep (1); Puducherry (1); Andaman & Nicobar (1)	13	Independent politician	1	▲1
Total	25 States and 7 UT	543			

==== Summary ====
Region	Total Seats	Bharatiya Janata Party			Indian National Congress			Others	
North India	118	40	40 / 118 (34%)	▼26	18	18 / 118 (15%)	▲13	60	▲39
West India	101	51	51 / 101 (50%)	▲23	25	25 / 101 (25%)	▼35	25	▲12
East India	117	34	34 / 117 (29%)	▲6	9	9 / 117 (8%)	▼2	74	▼8
South India	129	18	18 / 129 (14%)	▼2	33	33 / 129 (26%)	▼6	78	▲8
North-East India	25	2	2 / 25 (8%)	▲1	14	14 / 25 (56%)	▼1	9	Steady
Union Territories	13	8	8 / 13 (62%)	▼1	4	4 / 13 (31%)	▲1	1	Steady
Total	543	182	182 / 543 (34%)	Steady	114	114 / 543 (21%)	▼27	205	▼15

=== By state and alliance ===
State (# of seats)	Alliance/party				Seats contested	Seats won	% of votes				
Andhra Pradesh(42)	Alliance/party					NDA		Telugu Desam Party	34	29	39.85
Andhra Pradesh(42)		Bharatiya Janata Party (BJP)	8	7		NDA	9.90				
Andhra Pradesh(42)		Congress+		Indian National Congress	42	5	42.79				
Andhra Pradesh(42)		Third Front		Communist Party of India (Marxist) (CPM)	7	0	1.4				
Andhra Pradesh(42)		Third Front		Communist Party Of India (CPI)	6	0	1.3				
Andhra Pradesh(42)	-	-		All India Majlis-e-Ittehadul Muslimeen	1	1	6.05				
Arunachal Pradesh(2)		Congress+		Indian National Congress	2	2	56.92				
Arunachal Pradesh(2)		NDA		Arunachal Congress	1	0	16.62				
Arunachal Pradesh(2)		NDA		Bharatiya Janata Party (BJP)	1	0	16.30				
Arunachal Pradesh(2)	-	-		Nationalist Congress Party	1	0	7.77				
Assam(14)		Congress+		Indian National Congress	14	10	38.42				
Assam(14)		NDA		Bharatiya Janata Party (BJP)	12	2	29.84				
Assam(14)		Third Front		Asom Gana Parishad	8	0	11.92				
Assam(14)		Third Front		Communist Party of India (Marxist) (CPM)	2	0	1.8				
Assam(14)		Third Front		Communist Party of India (CPI)	1	0	0.6				
Assam(14)	-	-		Communist Party of India (Marxist–Leninist) Liberation	3	1	10.46				
Assam(14)	-	-		Independent	44	1	9.36				
Bihar(54)		NDA		Bharatiya Janata Party (BJP)	29	23	23.01				
Bihar(54)		NDA		Janata Dal (United)	23	18	20.77				
Bihar(54)		NDA		Bihar People's Party	2	0	1.7				
Bihar(54)		Congress+		Rashtriya Janata Dal	35	7	28.29				
Bihar(54)		Congress+		Indian National Congress	15	4	8.81				
Bihar(54)		Congress+		Communist Party of India (Marxist) (CPM)	1	0	0.1				
Bihar(54)		Congress+		Communist Party of India (CPI)	1	0	1.0				
Bihar(54)		Congress+		Rashtriya Lok Dal	1	0	0				
Bihar(54)		Third Front		Communist Party of India (Marxist) (CPM)	1	1	0.9				
Bihar(54)		Third Front		Communist Party of India (CPI)	8	0	1.7				
Bihar(54)		Third Front		All India Forward Bloc (AIFB)	1	0	0				
Bihar(54)	-	-		Independent	187	1	4.2				
Goa(2)		NDA		Bharatiya Janata Party (BJP)	2	2	51.49				
Goa(2)		Congress+		Indian National Congress	2	0	39.01				
Gujarat(26)		NDA		Bharatiya Janata Party (BJP)	26	20	52.48				
Gujarat(26)		Congress+		Indian National Congress	26	6	45.44				
Haryana(10)		NDA		Bharatiya Janata Party (BJP)	5	5	29.21				
Haryana(10)		NDA		Indian National Lok Dal	5	5	28.72				
Haryana(10)		Congress+		Indian National Congress	10	0	34.93				
Haryana(10)	-	-		Haryana Vikas Party	2	0	2.71				
Himachal Pradesh(4)		NDA		Bharatiya Janata Party (BJP)	3	3	46.27				
Himachal Pradesh(4)		NDA		Himachal Vikas Congress	1	1	12.37				
Himachal Pradesh(4)		Congress+		Indian National Congress	4	0	39.52				
Jammu & Kashmir(6)	-	-		Jammu & Kashmir National Conference	6	4	28.94				
Jammu & Kashmir(6)		NDA		Bharatiya Janata Party (BJP)	6	2	31.56				
Jammu & Kashmir(6)		Congress+		Indian National Congress	5	0	17.83				
Jammu & Kashmir(6)	-	-		Independent	28	0	9.63				
Karnataka(28)		Congress+		Indian National Congress	28	18	45.41				
Karnataka(28)		NDA		Bharatiya Janata Party (BJP)	19	7	27.19				
Karnataka(28)		NDA		Janata Dal (United)	9	3	13.28				
Karnataka(28)	-	-		Janata Dal (Secular)	27	0	10.85				
Kerala(20)		Congress+		Indian National Congress	17	8	39.25				
Kerala(20)		Congress+		Kerala Congress	1	1	2.3				
Kerala(20)		Congress+		Muslim League Kerala State Committee	2	2	5.6				
Kerala(20)		Third Front		Communist Party of India (Marxist) (CPM)	12	8	27.90				
Kerala(20)		Third Front		Communist Party of India (CPI)	4	0	7.57				
Kerala(20)		Third Front		Independent	2	0	3.6				
Kerala(20)		Third Front		Kerala Congress	1	1	2.4				
Kerala(20)		Third Front		Janata Dal (Secular)	1	0	2.2				
Kerala(20)		NDA		Bharatiya Janata Party (BJP)	14	0	6.56				
Kerala(20)		NDA		Janata Dal (United)	5	0	1.3				
Madhya Pradesh(40)		NDA		Bharatiya Janata Party (BJP)	40	29	46.58				
Madhya Pradesh(40)		Congress+		Indian National Congress	40	11	43.91				
Madhya Pradesh(40)	-	-		Bahujan Samaj Party	27	0	5.23				
Madhya Pradesh(40)	-	-		Samajwadi Party	20	0	1.37				
Maharashtra(48)		NDA		Shiv Sena	22	15	16.86				
Maharashtra(48)		NDA		Bharatiya Janata Party (BJP)	26	13	21.18				
Maharashtra(48)		Congress+		Indian National Congress	42	10	29.71				
Maharashtra(48)		Congress+		Bharipa Bahujan Mahasangh	4	1	2.1				
Maharashtra(48)		Congress+		Republican Party of India	2	0	1.4				
Maharashtra(48)	-	-		Nationalist Congress Party	38	6	21.58				
Maharashtra(48)	-	-		Janata Dal (Secular)	2	1	0.9				
Maharashtra(48)	-	-		Independent	78	1	3.3				
Maharashtra(48)	-	-		Peasants And Workers Party of India	2	1	0.9				
Manipur(2)		NDA		Manipur State Congress Party	1	1	24.89				
Manipur(2)		NDA		Bharatiya Janata Party (BJP)	1	0	1				
Manipur(2)	-	-		Nationalist Congress Party	1	1	13.49				
Manipur(2)	-	-		Manipur Peoples Party	1	0	16.25				
Orissa(21)		NDA		Biju Janata Dal	12	10	33.00				
Orissa(21)		NDA		Bharatiya Janata Party (BJP)	9	9	24.63				
Orissa(21)		Congress+		Indian National Congress	20	2	36.94				
Punjab(13)
Punjab(13)		Congress+		Indian National Congress	11	8	38.4				
Punjab(13)		Congress+		Communist Party of India (CPI)	1	1	3.7				
Punjab(13)		Congress+		Communist Party of India (Marxist) (CPM)	1	0	2.2				
Punjab(13)		NDA		Shiromani Akali Dal	9	2	28.6				
Punjab(13)		NDA		Bharatiya Janata Party (BJP)	3	1	9.2				
Punjab(13)		NDA		Democratic Bahujan Samaj Morcha	1	0	2.7				
Punjab(13)	-	-		Shiromani Akali Dal (Simranjit Singh Mann)	1	1	3.4				
Rajasthan(25)		NDA		Bharatiya Janata Party (BJP)	24	16	23.01				
Rajasthan(25)		NDA		Janata Dal (United)	1	0	1.6				
Rajasthan(25)		Congress+		Indian National Congress	25	9	17.83				
Tamil Nadu(39)
Tamil Nadu(39)		NDA		Dravida Munnetra Kazhagam	19	12	23.1				
Tamil Nadu(39)		NDA		Pattali Makkal Katchi	7	5	8.2				
Tamil Nadu(39)		NDA		Bharatiya Janata Party (BJP)	6	4	7.1				
Tamil Nadu(39)		NDA		Marumalarchi Dravida Munnetra Kazhagam	5	4	6.0				
Tamil Nadu(39)		NDA		MGR Anna Dravida Munnetra Kazhagam	1	1	1.5				
Tamil Nadu(39)		NDA		Tamizhaga Rajiv Congress	1	0	1.2				
Tamil Nadu(39)		Congress+		All India Anna Dravida Munnetra Kazhagam	24	10	25.7				
Tamil Nadu(39)		Congress+		Indian National Congress	11	2	11.1				
Tamil Nadu(39)		Congress+		Communist Party of India (Marxist) (CPM)	2	1	2.3				
Tamil Nadu(39)		Congress+		Communist Party Of India (CPI)	2	0	2.6				
Uttar Pradesh(85)
Uttar Pradesh(85)		NDA		Bharatiya Janata Party (BJP)	77	29	27.64				
Uttar Pradesh(85)		NDA		Akhil Bharatiya Lok Tantrik Congress	4	2	1.51				
Uttar Pradesh(85)		NDA		Independent	1	1	3.62				
Uttar Pradesh(85)		NDA		Janata Dal (United)	2	0	0.6				
Uttar Pradesh(85)		Congress+		Indian National Congress	76	10	14.72				
Uttar Pradesh(85)		Congress+		Rashtriya Lok Dal	6	2	2.49				
Uttar Pradesh(85)		Congress+		Republican Party of India	1	0	0				
Uttar Pradesh(85)	-	-		Bahujan Samaj Party	85	14	22.08				
Uttar Pradesh(85)	-	-		Samajwadi Party	84	26	24.06				
Uttar Pradesh(85)	-	-		Samajwadi Janata Party (Rashtriya)	2	1	0.46				
West Bengal(42)
West Bengal(42)		Third Front		Communist Party of India (Marxist) (CPM)	32	21	35.57				
West Bengal(42)		Third Front		Communist Party Of India (CPI)	3	3	3.47				
West Bengal(42)		Third Front		Revolutionary Socialist Party (RSP)	4	3	4.25				
West Bengal(42)		Third Front		All India Forward Bloc (AIFB)	3	2	3.45				
West Bengal(42)		NDA		All India Trinamool Congress (AITC)	28	8	26.04				
West Bengal(42)		NDA		Bharatiya Janata Party (BJP)	13	2	11.13				
West Bengal(42)		Congress+		Indian National Congress (INC)	41	3	13.29				

== Support for the new government ==
Political Party	Seats
Bharatiya Janata Party	182
Telugu Desam Party	29
Janata Dal (United)	21
Shiv Sena	15
Dravida Munnetra Kazhagam	12
Biju Janata Dal	10
Trinamool Congress	8
Pattali Makkal Katchi	5
Indian National Lok Dal	5
Marumalarchi Dravida Munnetra Kazhagam	4
Jammu & Kashmir National Conference	4
Shiromani Akali Dal	2
Rashtriya Lok Dal	2
Akhil Bharatiya Loktantrik Congress	2
MGR Anna Dravida Munnetra Kazhagam	1
Himachal Vikas Congress	1
Independent	1
Total	304

== See also ==
- List of members of the 13th Lok Sabha
- 1999 Indian general election by state or union territory
