= Narsingh Rao Dikshit =

Indian politician

Member of Parliament, Lok Sabha
- In office 1989-1991
- Preceded by: Krishna Pal Singh
- Succeeded by: Yoganand Saraswatial
- Constituency: Bhind

Personal details
- Born: 7 December 1920 Bhind, Madhya Pradesh, British India
- Party: Bharatiya Janata Party
- Spouse: Shanti Devi

Narsingh Rao Dikshit is an Indian politician. He was elected to the Lok Sabha, lower house of the Parliament of India from the Bhind constituency of Madhya Pradesh as a member of the Bharatiya Janata Party.
