= Mehrunnisa Parvez =

Indian writer of Hindi literature (born 1944)

- Born: 1944 (age 81–82); India
- Occupation: Writer
- Spouse: Bhagirath Prasad
- Children: 4 (Simala Prasad, IPS)
- Awards: Padma Shri
- Website: Personal website

Mehrunnisa Parvez is an Indian writer of Hindi literature.

== Biography ==
She was born in 1944; she published her first story in 1963 in Dharamayug magazine; and she has authored several short stories and novels in Hindi. Amma, published in 1967, and Samara, released in 1969, are two of her notable works. Besides, she has also published several short story anthologies, and her works have been the subject of academic studies. The Government of India awarded her the fourth highest civilian honour of the Padma Shri in 2005 for her contributions to Indian literature.

She is married to Shri Bhagirath Prasad, a retired Indian Administrative Service officer who is the first person to enter into this prestigious service from the state of Madhya Pradesh and the current Member of Parliament from Bhind Lok Sabha Constituency in Madhya Pradesh. The couple lives in Bhopal, Madhya Pradesh.

== See also ==
- Hindi literature
- List of Hindi-language authors
