= Arvind Singh Bhadoria =

Cabinet Minister of Madhya Pradesh

Cabinet Minister of Madhya Pradesh
- In office 2 July 2020 – 2023
- Governor: Anandiben Patel (Additional Charge); Mangubhai C. Patel
- Preceded by: Govind Singh

Member of Madhya Pradesh Legislative Assembly
- In office 10 December 2018 – 2023
- Succeeded by: Hemant Katare
- Constituency: Ater constituency
- In office 10 December 2008 – 25 November 2013
- Succeeded by: Satyadev Katare
- Constituency: Ater constituency

Personal details
- Born: 2 October 1968 (age 57) Bhind, Madhya Pradesh, India
- Spouse: Archana Bhadoria
- Children: 1
- Education: Jiwaji University (MA LLB PhD (Military Science))
- Website: arvindbhadoria.org

Arvind Singh Bhadoria is an Indian politician and leader of the Bharatiya Janata Party (BJP). He has served as the Minister of Cooperative and Public Service Management in the Government of Madhya Pradesh since 2 July 2020. He was elected as a Member of the Madhya Pradesh Legislative Assembly for a second term for the Ater constituency of Bhind district.

== Early life ==
Arvind Singh Bhadoria was born on 2 October 1969 in Gyanpura village of Bhind district in Madhya Pradesh, the third child of Kamala Devi and Shivnath Singh Bhadoria. His mother was a housewife and his father served in the police department. At a young age, he joined the Shakha of the RSS with which he remained associated for a long time. He also joined the student organization Akhil Bharatiya Vidyarthi Parishad (ABVP). In 2007, he married Archana Bhadoria, and their first child, Viraj Bhadoria was born in 2011.

== Political career ==
Bhadoria became involved in student politics when he joined ABVP in 1984. In 1986, he became the Mantri of ABVP's Bhind branch. In 1987 he became the Convener of the Bhind branch, and then contested the student union election of MJS College in Bhind. In 1989, he became the Department Coordinator. He became a full-time ABVP member in 1990. From 1990 to 1994, two divisions were the Organization Secretary of the Bhopal and Gwalior joint division. In 1994 he became the Provincial Secretary of the Madhya Bharat province. From 1995 to 2003, he was the Provincial Organization Minister of Madhya Bharat. After this, he was the Organization Secretary of Yuva Morcha until 2003–2004. He led the 2003 assembly election management team. In 2004, he was made the National Vice President of Bharatiya Janata Yuva Morcha, and in 2005 he was made the State Secretary of the Madhya Pradesh BJP, which he remained for 5 consecutive terms until 2011. From 2011 to 2014, he was the National Vice President and National General Secretary of BJP and Kisan Morcha respectively. From 2014 to 2016, he was the General Secretary of the Madhya Pradesh BJP. In 2015, he was elected State Managing Committee member of the Indian Red Cross Society, later becoming the Vice President of the Madhya Pradesh BJP from 2016 to 2019. In 2018 he also became the State Vice President of the Indian Red Cross Society in Madhya Pradesh.

== As representative ==
Bhadoria became a Member of the Legislative Assembly for the first time in 2008 for the Ater constituency by defeating Indian National Congress leader, former Home Minister and former Leader of the Opposition Satyadev Katare. In 2018 he was reelected as MLA for Ater. The role of Arvind Singh Bhadoria was very significant to the 2020 Madhya Pradesh political crisis. He became the Minister of Cooperative and Public Service Management after the re-formation of the Shivraj government in 2020.
