= Ater Assembly constituency =

Constituency of the Madhya Pradesh legislative assembly in India

Coordinates: 26.75°N 78.64°E

Ater
- Constituency No. 9 for the Madhya Pradesh Legislative Assembly

Constituency details
- Country: India
- Region: Central India
- State: Madhya Pradesh
- District: Bhind
- Lok Sabha constituency: Bhind
- Established: 1951
- Reservation: None

Member of Legislative Assembly
- 16th Madhya Pradesh Legislative Assembly
- Incumbent Hemant Katare
- Party: Indian National Congress
- Elected year: 2023
- Preceded by: Arvind Singh Bhadoria

Ater Assembly constituency (formerly, Attair) is one of the 230 Vidhan Sabha (Legislative Assembly) constituencies of Madhya Pradesh state in central India. This constituency came into existence in 1951, as one of the 79 Vidhan Sabha constituencies of the erstwhile Madhya Bharat state.

== Overview ==
Ater (constituency number 9) is one of the 5 Vidhan Sabha constituencies located in Bhind district. This constituency covers the entire Ater tehsil, part of Bhind tehsil and Phuphkalan nagar panchayat.

Ater is part of Bhind Lok Sabha constituency along with seven other Vidhan Sabha segments, namely, Bhind, Lahar, Mehgaon and Gohad in this district and Sewda, Bhander and Datia in Datia district.

== Members of the Legislative Assembly ==
Madhya Bharat
Year	Member	Party
1951	Baboo Ram	Indian National Congress

Madhya Pradesh Legislative Assembly
Election	Member	Party
1957	Hari Gyan Bohre	Praja Socialist Party
1962	Ram Krishan Dixit	Indian National Congress
1967	Hari Gyan Bohre	Praja Socialist Party
1972	Rameshwar Dayal Arele	Indian National Congress
1977	Shiv Shankar Lal Samadhiya	Janata Party
1980	Parshuram Singh Bhadoriya	Indian National Congress
1985	Satyadev Katare	Indian National Congress
1990	Munna Singh Bhadoria	Bharatiya Janata Party
1993	Satyadev Katare	Indian National Congress
1998	Munna Singh Bhadoria	Bharatiya Janata Party
2003	Satyadev Katare	Indian National Congress
2008	Arvind Singh Bhadoria	Bhartiya Janata Party
2013	Satyadev Katare	Indian National Congress
2017^	Hemant Katare	Indian National Congress
2018	Arvind Singh Bhadoria	Bharatiya Janata Party
2023	Hemant Katare	Indian National Congress

^ bypolls

== Election results ==
=== 2023 ===
2023 Madhya Pradesh Legislative Assembly election: Ater
Party	Candidate	Votes	%	±%
INC	Hemant Katare	69,542	45.51	+5.73
BJP	Arvind Singh Bhadoria	49,314	32.27	−11.18
BSP	Hari Shankar Fhogi	18,787	12.29	+0.06
SP	Munna Singh Bhadouria	10,288	6.73	+6.25
NOTA	None of the above	168	0.11	−0.03
Majority		20,228	13.24	+9.57
Turnout		152,815	63.39	+1.62
INC gain from BJP		Swing		

=== 2018 ===
2018 Madhya Pradesh Legislative Assembly election: Ater
Party	Candidate	Votes	%	±%
BJP	Arvind Singh Bhadoria	58,928	43.45	
INC	Hemant Katare	53,950	39.78	
BSP	Sanjeev Baghel	16,585	12.23	
NOTA	None of the above	195	0.14	
Majority		4,978	3.67	
Turnout		135,628	61.77	
BJP gain from		Swing		

== See also ==
- Bhind district
- Ater, Madhya Pradesh
