= Bhind Assembly constituency =

Constituency of the Madhya Pradesh legislative assembly in India

Coordinates: 26.56°N 78.79°E

Bhind
- Constituency No. 10 for the Madhya Pradesh Legislative Assembly

Constituency details
- Country: India
- Region: Central India
- State: Madhya Pradesh
- District: Bhind
- Lok Sabha constituency: Bhind
- Established: 1951
- Reservation: None

Member of Legislative Assembly
- 16th Madhya Pradesh Legislative Assembly
- Incumbent Narendra Singh Kushwah
- Party: Bharatiya Janta Party
- Elected year: 2023
- Preceded by: Sanjeev Singh Kushwah

Bhind Assembly constituency is one of the 230 Vidhan Sabha (Legislative Assembly) constituencies of Madhya Pradesh state in central India. This constituency came into existence in 1951, as one of the 79 Vidhan Sabha constituencies of the erstwhile Madhya Bharat state.

== Overview ==
Bhind (constituency number 10) is one of the 5 Vidhan Sabha constituencies located in Bhind district. This constituency covers part of Bhind tehsil, Akoda nagar panchayat and Bhind municipality.

Bhind is part of Bhind Lok Sabha constituency along with seven other Vidhan Sabha segments, namely, Ater, Lahar, Mehgaon and Gohad in this district and Sewda, Bhander and Datia in Datia district.

== Members of the Legislative Assembly ==
Madhya Bharat
Year	MLA	Party
1951	Narsinghrao Jabarsingh	Indian National Congress

Madhya Pradesh Legislative Assembly
Year	MLA	Party
1957	Narsinghrao Jabarsingh	Indian National Congress
1962	Narsinghrao Jabarsingh	Indian National Congress
1967	Raghubir Singh Kushwah	Samyukta Socialist Party
1972	Navin Chandra Bhoota	Indian National Congress
1977	Om Kumari Kushwah	Janata Party
1980	Chaudhary Dilip Singh Chaturvedi	Bharatiya Janata Party
1985	Udayabhan Singh	Indian National Congress
1990	Chaudhary Rakesh Singh Chaturvedi	Indian National Congress
1993	Ramlakhan Singh Kushwah	Bharatiya Janata Party
1996 (By-election)	Chaudhary Rakesh Singh Chaturvedi	Indian National Congress
1998	Chaudhary Rakesh Singh Chaturvedi	Indian National Congress
2003	Narendra Singh Kushwah	Bharatiya Janata Party
2008	Chaudhary Rakesh Singh Chaturvedi	Indian National Congress
2013	Narendra Singh Kushwah	Bharatiya Janata Party
2018	Sanjeev Singh Kushwah (Sanju)	Bahujan Samaj Party
2023	Narendra Singh Kushwah	Bharatiya Janata Party

== Election results ==
=== 2023 ===
2023 Madhya Pradesh Legislative Assembly election: Bhind
Party	Candidate	Votes	%	±%
BJP	Narendra Singh Kushwah	66,420	40.96	+18.51
INC	Chaudhary Rakesh Singh Chaturvedi	52,274	32.24	+26.63
BSP	Sanjeev Singh (Sanju)	34,938	21.55	−25.17
AAP	Rahul Singh Kushwah	3,056	1.88	+1.59
NOTA	None of the above	422	0.26	−0.38
Majority		14,146	8.72	−15.55
Turnout		162,149	58.95	+0.38
BJP gain from BSP		Swing		

=== 2018 ===
2018 Madhya Pradesh Legislative Assembly election: Bhind
Party	Candidate	Votes	%	±%
BSP	Sanjeev Singh Kushwah	69,107	46.72	
BJP	Chaudhary Rakesh Singh Chaturvedi	33,211	22.45	
SP	Narendra Singh Kushwah	30,474	20.6	
INC	Ramesh Dubey	8,297	5.61	
NOTA	None of the above	942	0.64	
Majority		35,896	24.27	
Turnout		147,922	58.57	
BSP gain from BJP		Swing		

2013 Madhya Pradesh Legislative Assembly election: Bhind
Party	Candidate	Votes	%	±%
BJP	Narendra Singh Kushwah	51,170	41.12	
BSP	Sanjeev Singh Kushwah (Sanju)	45,177	36.30	
INC	Dr. Radheshyam Sharma	21,281	17.10	
Bahujan Sangharshh Dal	Manoj Kumar Jain (Akoda Wale)	2,359	1.90	
SP	Kushwah Nayan Singh	1,523	1.22	
Majority		5,993		
Turnout		1,24,442	55.8%	
BJP gain from INC		Swing		
