= Chaudhary Dilip Singh Chaturvedi =

Indian politician

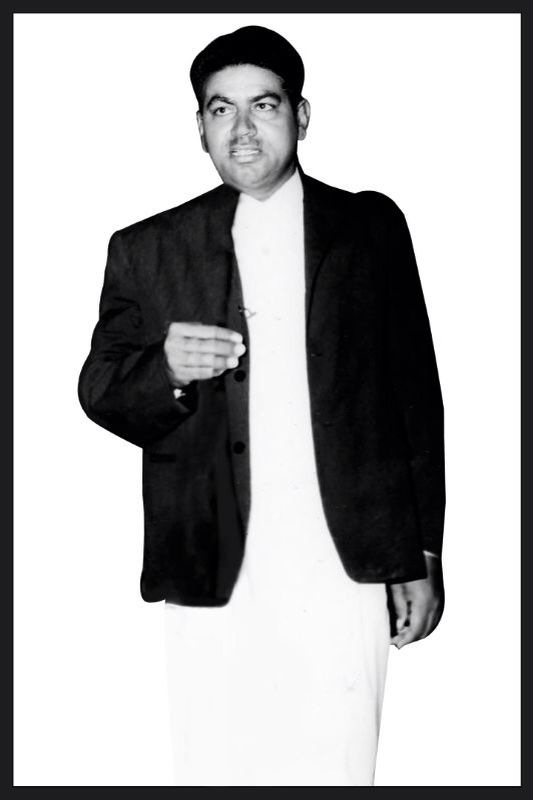
- At a public rally in December 1982

Personal details
- Born: 11 January 1932 Sahabda, United Provinces of Agra and Oudh, British India
- Died: 9 February 1990 (aged 58) New Delhi, India
- Party: Bharatiya Janta Party (1980–1990)
- Other political affiliations: Praja Socialist Party (1952–1972)
- Spouse: Smt Sharda Devi (m. 1947)
- Children: 3 daughters and 2 sons Chaudhary Rakesh Singh Chaturvedi; Chaudhary Mukesh Singh Chaturvedi
- Parent(s): Chaudhary Kalicharan Singh; Smt Suraj Kunwar
- Education: M.A, LLB
- Alma mater: University of Lucknow
- Profession: Politician, lawyer and agriculturist

Chaudhary Dilip Singh Chaturvedi (11 January 1932 – 9 February 1990) was an Indian politician and an eminent lawyer from the central Indian state of Madhya Pradesh. He became a Member of the Legislative Assembly (MLA) of the Madhya Pradesh Legislative Assembly as a Bharatiya Janta Party candidate for the Bhind constituency following the 1980 elections. He was a socialist leader.

Fiery, stalwart socialist leaders like Acharya Narendra Dev (then vice-chancellor, University of Lucknow) and Jayaprakash Narayan were his mentors and a major influence on his political and social ideology. He joined the socialist movement in student life and became actively involved in the Praja Socialist Party. He was known as a firebrand in student politics and started his political career with Chandra Shekhar and Dr. Ram Manohar Lohia.

Chaudhary was the father of two politician sons, Chaudhary Rakesh Singh Chaturvedi and Chaudhary Mukesh Singh Chaturvedi.

== Early life and education ==
Chaudhary was born on 11 January 1932 in a Brahmin family at Sahabda, Auraiya, Uttar Pradesh. He completed his primary education from Sahabda, middle education from Muradganj, high school from Bhind and higher secondary from SD Inter College, Etawah before pursuing a Bachelor of Arts from the University of Lucknow and graduated in 1953. Further, in 1955, he received a Master of Arts in Political Science and Bachelor of Laws (LL.B) from the University of Lucknow.

He married Smt. Sharda Devi in 1947 and the couple had three daughters and two sons. The hereditary title of Chaudhary – recognising the tutelary lordship, was conferred on his grandfather.

== Political career ==
=== Socialism and student politics ===
Chaudhary was the President of the University of Lucknow's Students' Union in 1955–56. He also served as President of the Political Science Association at the University of Lucknow. At Lucknow, he was also the captain of the university's kabaddi team.

University of Lucknow's vice-chancellor Radhakamal Mukherjee noticed Chaudhary's leadership potential and encouraged it further by personally mentoring him. On his invitation Jayprakash Narayan (Chapra, Bihar) commenced the university's annual celebration day. His hostel room, Room 51, Subhash Hostel at the university became frequently visited by Chandra Shekhar and Dr Ram Manohar Lohia on their trips to Lucknow.

Chaudhary was a member of the Indian National Union of Students' delegation to the historic Afro-Asian Students Conference held at Bandung, Indonesia in 1956. Under the leadership of Prime Minister Jawaharlal Nehru, his colleagues in the delegation were Pran Nath Sabharwal (President, Delhi University's Students' Union; led the delegation), Chandra Bhal Tripathi (President, GIC Lucknow), Samarendra Kundu (former Minister, Government of India) and Rajendra Nath Madan.

=== Praja Socialist Party, Bharatiya Janta Party and state politics ===
Chaudhary was jailed multiple times during the socialist movement. After the Praja Socialist Party dissolved, Chaudhary joined Bharatiya Janta Party under Rajmata Vijaya Raje Scindia. Chaudhary attended the first national convention of the Bharatiya Janta Party held at Mumbai in December 1980.

Hailing from the Chambal region, he represented Bhind in the 7th Madhya Pradesh Legislative Assembly as a Member of Legislative Assembly after the 1980 elections as a Bharatiya Janta Party candidate, in the same year when the party was formed. He was elected from Bhind on June 2, 1980. Chaudhary served actively as a member in the Chairman's committee and the Law committee in the Madhya Pradesh Legislative Assembly.

Chaudhary was the vice-president of district Bar Association, Bhind. He also served as the president and vice-president of Bhind marketing society and co-operative bank. Chaudhary was elected for two consecutive terms from 1972 to 1980 as the Bhind Janpad president.

Alongside, practising law in the Chambal division, Chaudhary also established the first all-girls school in the division, Janta School in Bhind and promoted various educational institutions intending to provide better access to quality education in the Chambal division, with a special effort on education for females up to college level.

== Death and legacy ==
Chaudhary succumbed to a cardiac arrest at an age of 58 on February 9, 1990, in New Delhi.

Taking their father's legacy forward, his sons, administer the Chaudhary Dilip Singh Foundation.

== See also ==
- Chaudhary Rakesh Singh Chaturvedi, son
- Chaudhary Mukesh Singh Chaturvedi, son
- Bhind (Vidhan Sabha constituency)
