= Bhander Assembly constituency =

Assembly constituency in Madhya Pradesh

Coordinates: 25.74°N 78.75°E

Bhander
- Constituency No. 21 for the Madhya Pradesh Legislative Assembly

Constituency details
- Country: India
- Region: Central India
- State: Madhya Pradesh
- District: Datia
- Lok Sabha constituency: Bhind
- Established: 1957
- Reservation: SC

Member of Legislative Assembly
- 16th Madhya Pradesh Legislative Assembly
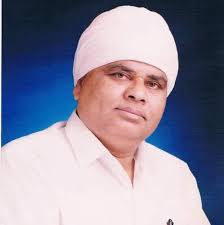
- Incumbent Phool Singh Baraiya
- Party: Indian National Congress
- Elected year: 2023
- Preceded by: Raksha Santram Saroniya

Bhander is one of the 230 Vidhan Sabha (Legislative Assembly) constituencies of Madhya Pradesh state in central India. This constituency is reserved for the candidates belonging to the Scheduled castes from its inception.

== Overview ==
Bhander is one of the 3 Vidhan Sabha constituencies located in Datia district. This constituency covers the entire Bhander tehsil and part of Datia tehsil of the district.

Bhander is part of Bhind Lok Sabha constituency along with seven other Vidhan Sabha segments, namely, Sewda and Datia in this district and Bhind, Ater, Lahar, Mehgaon and Gohad in Bhind district.

== Members of the Legislative Assembly ==
Pichhore Gird constituency:
Year	Member	Party
1957	Raja Ram Singh	Indian National Congress

Madhya Pradesh Legislative Assembly: Bhander Constituency
Year	Member	Party
1962	Raja Ram Singh	Indian National Congress
1967	Kishorilal Hans	Bharatiya Jana Sangh
1972	Chaturbhuj Morya	Bharatiya Jana Sangh
1977	Nand Lal Saroniya	Janata Party
1980	Kamlapat Arya	Indian National Congress (Indira)
1985	Radhesham Chandoriya	Indian National Congress
1990	Pooram Singh Palaiya	Bharatiya Janata Party
1993	Keshri Choudhary	Indian National Congress
1998	Phool Singh Baraiya	Bahujan Samaj Party
2003	Kamlapat Arya	Bharatiya Janata Party
2008	Asha Ram Ahirwar	Bharatiya Janata Party
2013	Ghanshyam Pironiya	Bharatiya Janata Party
2018	Raksha Santram Saroniya	Indian National Congress
2020^	Raksha Santram Saroniya	Bharatiya Janata Party
2023	Phool Singh Baraiya	Indian National Congress

^ bypolls

== Election results ==
=== 2023 ===
2023 Madhya Pradesh Legislative Assembly election: Bhander
Party	Candidate	Votes	%	±%
INC	Phool Singh Baraiya	82,043	58.67	+13.55
BJP	Ghanshyam Pironiya	52,605	37.62	−7.63
BSP	Chaudhari Raju Dohare	1,954	1.4	−4.20
NOTA	None of the above	1,175	0.84	−0.44
Majority		29,438	21.05	+20.92
Turnout		139,828	73.62	+2.02
INC hold		Swing		

=== 2020 bypolls ===
2020 Madhya Pradesh Legislative Assembly by-elections: Bhander
Party	Candidate	Votes	%	±%
BJP	Raksha Santram Saroniya	57,043	45.25	+16.81
INC	Phool Singh Baraiya	56,882	45.12	−17.00
BSP	Mahendra Boudh	7,055	5.60	+3.37
NOTA	None of the above	1,619	1.28	+0.24
Majority		161	0.13	−33.55
Turnout		126,068	71.6	+2.11
BJP gain from INC		Swing		

=== 2018 ===
2018 Madhya Pradesh Legislative Assembly election: Bhander
Party	Candidate	Votes	%	±%
INC	Raksha Santram Saroniya	73,578	62.12	
BJP	Rajni Prajapati	33,682	28.44	
BSP	Kiran Bala	2,642	2.23	
Bahujan Sangharsh Dal	Narayan Singh	2,323	1.96	
Bhartiya Shakti Chetna Party	Karan Singh	1,165	0.97	
NOTA	None of the above	1,228	1.04	
Majority		39,896	33.68	
Turnout		118,447	69.49	
BJP hold		Swing		

== See also ==
- Bhander
