= Raksha Santram Saroniya =

Indian politician

Member of Madhya Pradesh Legislative Assembly
- In office 2018–2023
- Preceded by: Ghanshyam Pironiya
- Succeeded by: Phool Singh Baraiya
- Constituency: Bhander

Personal details
- Party: Bharatiya Janata Party
- Other political affiliations: Indian National Congress

Raksha Santram Saroniya is an Indian politician. She was elected to the Madhya Pradesh Legislative Assembly from Bhander. She was an elected member of the Madhya Pradesh Legislative Assembly as a member of the Indian National Congress. During 2020 Madhya Pradesh political crisis, She supported senior Congress leader Jyotiraditya Scindia and was one of the 22 MLAs who resigned and later joined Bharatiya Janata Party.
