= Vankhandeshwar Mahadev Temple =

Hindu deities temple in india

Coordinates: 26°33′35″N 78°47′31″E

Vankhandeshwar Mahadev
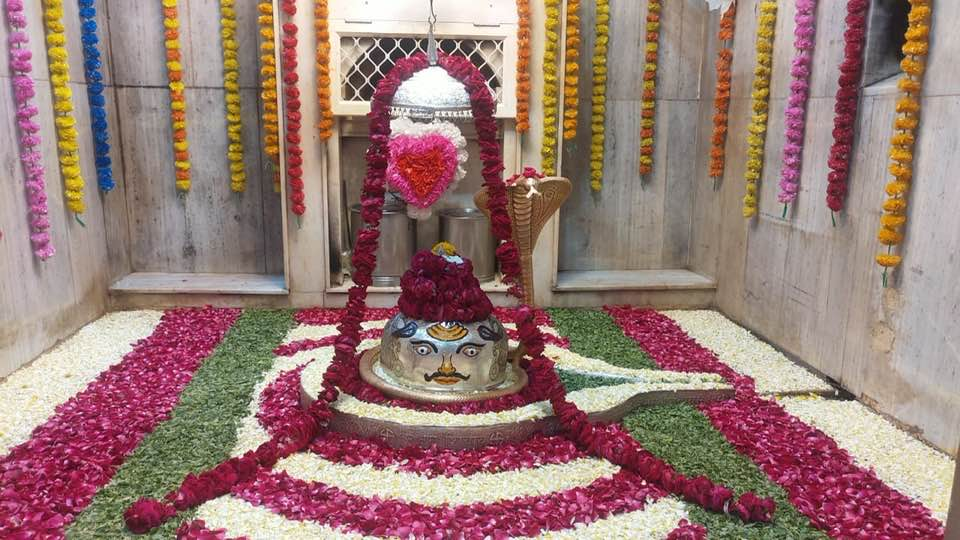

Religion
- Affiliation: Hinduism
- District: Bhind
- Deity: Shiva
- Festivals: Maha Shivaratri; Shiva Baraat
- Features: Temple tree: Peepal

Location
- Location: Vankhandeshwar Mandir, HQ5R+WRF, Sarvoday Nagar, Bhind, Madhya Pradesh, India 477001
- State: Madhya Pradesh
- Interactive map of Vankhandeshwar Mahadev

Architecture
- Type: Nagara
- Creator: Maharaja Mahendra Badan Singh Bhadauria
- Completed: 1652 AD

Vankhandeshwar Mahadev Mandir is a Hindu temple dedicated to Hindu deity Shiva located on the banks of Gauri Lake in Bhind, Madhya Pradesh, India.

== History ==
It was built by the Maharaja of Bhadawar, Badan Singh Devju Bhadauria in 1652 A.D., after the construction of Gauri Taal, surrounded by fine ghats, and on the bank of which stands the temple of Vyankateshwar Mahadev.

There is famous old mythical assertion that the temple was built by Samrat Prithviraj Chauhan, but no contemporary and epigraphical sources proves that it was built by him.

== About the Temple ==
The Shivalinga present in the temple is swayambhu. Akhand jyoti or the eternal flame of two diyas is continuously burning in the temple since the construction of temple. Every year at the time of Mahashivaratri lakhs of devotees go to the mandir to take blessings of Mahadev.

Apart from Mahadev, idols of Shri Ram, Laxman, Mata Jaanki, Lord Ganesh are also present in the temple.An old Peepal tree is also located in the temple premises.

The Maha Aarti is organized in this temple every Monday, with devotees from far flung areas coming to attend
