= Chaudhary Rakesh Singh Chaturvedi =

Indian politician (born 1962)

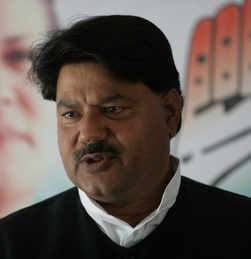

Personal details
- Born: 21 January 1962 (age 64) Bhind, Madhya Pradesh, India
- Party: Indian National Congress (1979–2013, 2019 – present); Bharatiya Janta Party (2013–2019)
- Spouse: Manju Chaturvedi (m. 1987)
- Children: 3
- Parent: Chaudhary Dilip Singh Chaturvedi (father)
- Education: Barkatullah University, Bhopal (MA, LL.B.)
- Profession: Politician; lawyer; agriculturist

Chaudhary Rakesh Singh Chaturvedi (born 21 January 1962) is an Indian politician of the Indian National Congress party from Madhya Pradesh. Hailing from the Chambal region, he has been a four-time Member of Legislative Assembly of the Madhya Pradesh Legislative Assembly from the Bhind constituency since 1990. Previously, he had served the 13th Madhya Pradesh Legislative Assembly as the deputy leader of the opposition and as the leader of the opposition. Prior to that, he was a minister in Chief Minister Digvijaya Singh's cabinet between 1998 and 2003.

== Early life ==
Chaturvedi was born on 21 January 1962 in Bhind, Madhya Pradesh. He completed his primary education from Bhind before pursuing a Bachelor of Laws (LL.B) from Hamidia College, Barkatullah University, Bhopal and graduated in 1985. Further, in 1987, he received a Master of Arts in Sociology from Barkatullah University, Bhopal.

His father, Chaudhary Dilip Singh Chaturvedi was a Member of Legislative Assembly from Bharatiya Janata Party representing Bhind constituency following the 1980 election; and as the President of University of Lucknow's Students' Union, 1955–56, he led the Indian delegation to the historic Afro-Asian Students Conference held at Bandung, Indonesia in 1956. The hereditary title of Chaudhary – recognising the tutelary lordship, was conferred on his great grandfather.

His younger brother, Chaudhary Mukesh Singh Chaturvedi, is a state Bharatiya Janata Party leader, who represented Mehgaon as a Member of Legislative Assembly in the 14th Madhya Pradesh Legislative Assembly following the 2013 elections.

Chaturvedi administers the Chaudhary Dilip Singh Foundation. Taking his father's legacy forward, who established the first all-girls school in the division, the foundation runs various educational institutions intending to provide better access to quality education in the Chambal division, with a special effort on education for females up to college level.

He is married to Manju Chaturvedi of Dholpur, Rajasthan and the couple has a daughter and two sons.

== Political career ==
=== Early years ===
Chaturvedi started his political journey in 1979 when he became the President of National Students' Union of India, Bhind. He also served as the General Secretary of Indian Youth Congress, Bhind district between 1983 and 1985, and was later elected as the Director of Bhind Marketing Society in 1987.

He became a Member of the Legislative Assembly as an Indian National Congress representative from Bhind in the 1990 elections to the 9th Madhya Pradesh Legislative Assembly. This was the same constituency that his father had won as an MLA in the 1980 elections as a Bharatiya Janata Party candidate, in the same year when the party was formed, to the 7th Madhya Pradesh Legislative Assembly.

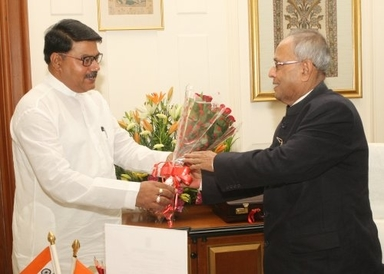
Chaturvedi with President Pranab Mukherjee

He was President of the District Congress Committee, Bhind between 1995 and 1996. Chaturvedi was re-elected as a Member of the Legislative Assembly following the 1996 by-election to the 10th Madhya Pradesh Legislative Assembly. After third term re-election to the 11th Madhya Pradesh Legislative Assembly following 1998 elections, Chaturvedi took oath as Cabinet Minister for Urban Development, Housing and Environment portfolio in Chief Minister Digvijaya Singh's cabinet in the Government of Madhya Pradesh.

=== Legislative performance ===
As a recognition of his competence and exemplary knowledge of parliamentary rules and regulations – he was conferred with the 'Pt. Kunji Lal Dubey Excellent MLA award' on 8 August 2003. Chaturvedi was also nominated to the chairperson's panel several times. He has served as the chairman of several committees in different terms, including the estimates committee, the privilege committee, the public undertakings committee and other select committees.

Chaturvedi maintained Congress's stronghold on the Bhind seat and registered his fourth victory to the 13th Madhya Pradesh Legislative Assembly following the 2008 elections. He was appointed as spokesperson of Madhya Pradesh Congress Committee and Indian National Congress MLAs in the Madhya Pradesh Legislative Assembly between 2008 and 2013. Acknowledging his parliamentary potential, Jamuna Devi, the then leader of the opposition, appointed him as the deputy leader of the opposition. After her demise, he served as the leader of the opposition in the Madhya Pradesh Legislative Assembly.

=== Floor-crossing and homecoming ===
Chaturvedi switched from Indian National Congress to Bharatiya Janata Party in July 2013. His younger brother, Chaudhary Mukesh Singh Chaturvedi won the 2013 elections from Mehgaon constituency to the 14th Madhya Pradesh Legislative Assembly as a Bharatiya Janata Party candidate.

On 20 April 2019, Chaturvedi returned to Indian National Congress in presence of the then party general secretary Jyotiraditya Scindia at his election nomination rally in Shivpuri.

Chaturvedi was made the Star Campaigner for 2021 Damoh Legislative Assembly By-Election by the Indian National Congress.

On 26 July 2021, Chaturvedi was made the Madhya Pradesh Congress Committee in-charge of Morena.
