= Narendra Singh Kushwah =

Indian politician

Member of the 12th Madhya Pradesh Legislative Assembly
- In office 2003–2008
- Constituency: Bhind

Member of the 14th Madhya Pradesh Legislative Assembly
- In office 2013–2018
- Constituency: Bhind

Member of the 16th Madhya Pradesh Legislative Assembly
- Incumbent
- Assumed office 2023
- Constituency: Bhind

Personal details
- Party: BJP
- Profession: Politician

Narendra Singh Kushwah is an Indian politician currently serving as a member of the 16th Madhya Pradesh Assembly, representing the Bhind constituency as a member of the Bharatiya Janata Party.

== Career ==
He previously served as an MLA from the Bhind Assembly constituency from 2003 to 2008 and then again from 2013 to 2018.

Following the 2023 Madhya Pradesh Legislative Assembly election, he was re-elected as an MLA from the Bhind Assembly constituency, defeating Chaudhary Rakesh Singh Chaturvedi, the Indian National Congress candidate, by a margin of 14,146 votes.
