= Sandhya Ray =

Indian politician (born 1974)

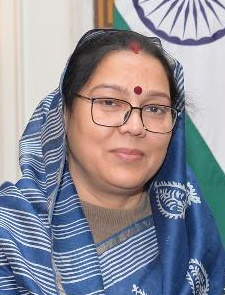
- Ray in 2020

Member of Panel of Chairpersons (Lok Sabha)
- Incumbent
- Assumed office 1 July 2024 Serving with Dilip Saikia, Jagdambika Pal, Krishna Prasad Tenneti, Kakoli Ghosh Dastidar, A. Raja, P. C. Mohan, Awadhesh Prasad, Selja Kumari, N. K. Premachandran
- Appointed by: Om Birla

Member of Parliament, Lok Sabha
- Incumbent
- Assumed office 23 May 2019
- Preceded by: Bhagirath Prasad
- Constituency: Bhind, Madhya Pradesh

Member of Madhya Pradesh Legislative Assembly
- In office 2003–2008
- Succeeded by: Shiv Mangal Singh Tomar
- Constituency: Dimani

Personal details
- Born: 4 January 1974 (age 52) Kamra, Madhya Pradesh, India
- Party: Bharatiya Janata Party
- Spouse: Suman Ray
- Children: 3
- Education: M.A, LL.B
- Alma mater: Jiwaji University; Barkatullah Vishwavidyalaya, Bhopal and Government State Level Law College, Bhopal (M.A., LL.B)
- Profession: Advocate; agriculturalist

Sandhya Ray (born 4 January 1974; Hindi pronunciation: [sən̪d̪ʱjaː ɾaːj]) is an Indian politician. She was elected to the Lok Sabha, lower house of the Parliament of India from Bhind, Madhya Pradesh since 2019 as member of the Bharatiya Janata Party. She is also a member of Panel of Chairpersons in 18th Lok Sabha.

In 2024, Lok Sabha Election Sandhya Ray defeated INC's Phool Singh Baraiya by a margin of 64,840 votes.

== Personal life ==
Ray was born to father Sabharam Tainguriya and mother Ram Katori Bai Tainguriya in Kamra, Morena in Madhya Pradesh. She did her Master of Arts and Bachelor of Law from Jiwaji University, Barkatullah Vishwavidyalaya, Bhopal and Government State Level Law College, Bhopal. She married Suman Ray, with whom she has two sons and a daughter. Ray is an advocate and agriculturalist by profession.
