= Narsinghrao Jabarsingh =

Indian politician

Narsinghrao Jabarsingh Dixit

MLA in the Madhya Pradesh Legislative Assembly
- In office 1951–1967
- Succeeded by: Raghubir Singh
- Constituency: Bhind

Narsinghrao Jabarsingh Dixit was an Indian politician from the state of the Madhya Pradesh. He represented Bhind Vidhan Sabha constituency in Madhya Pradesh Legislative Assembly from Indian National Congress by winning General election of 1957.
