= O. P. S. Bhadoria =

Indian politician

Member of Madhya Pradesh Legislative Assembly
- In office December 2018 – December 2023
- Constituency: Mehgaon

Personal details
- Born: 21 August 1969 (age 56)
- Party: Bharatiya Janata Party (2020 onwards)
- Parent: Hargovind Singh Bhadoria (father)
- Occupation: Politician

O. P. S. Bhadoria is an Indian politician. He is a former MLA of Mehgaon constituency in Madhya Pradesh and a leader of the Scindia squad, Former Minister of State in the Shivraj Singh Chouhan led government.

Bhadoria stood as a candidate of the Indian National Congress (INC) for the Mehgaon constituency in the elections to the Madhya Pradesh Legislative Assembly of 2018. His principal opponent was Rakesh Shukla of the Bharatiya Janata Party (BJP). Bhadoria had lost the 2013 contest in that constituency to another BJP candidate, Mukesh Choudhary.

In July 2020, Bhadoria was appointed a minister of state. Along with some other MLAs, he had resigned from the assembly in March in a show of support for his leader Jyotiraditya Scindia who claim to have influence in Chambal-Gwalior region that had resulted in the collapse of the state government headed by Kamal Nath. The MLAs also resigned from the INC and joined the BJP.
