= Rakesh Shukla (politician) =

Indian politician

Minister of Renewable Energy Government of Madhya Pradesh
- Incumbent
- Assumed office 25 December 2023
- Chief Minister: Mohan Yadav
- Preceded by: Hardeep Singh Dang

Member of Madhya Pradesh Legislative Assembly
- Incumbent
- Assumed office 2023
- Preceded by: O. P. S. Bhadoria
- Constituency: Mehgaon
- In office 2008–2013
- Preceded by: Munna Singh Narwaria
- Succeeded by: Mukesh Chaturvedi
- Constituency: Mehgaon
- In office 1998–2003
- Preceded by: Naresh Gurjar
- Succeeded by: Munna Singh Narwaria
- Constituency: Mehgaon

Personal details
- Party: B.J.P.
- Profession: Politician

Rakesh Shukla is an Indian politician of the Bharatiya Janata Party (BJP) and currently serving as a Cabinet Minister of New and Renewable Energy in the Madhya Pradesh Government and member of the Madhya Pradesh Legislative Assembly from the Mehgaon constituency.
