= Phool Singh Baraiya =

Indian politician

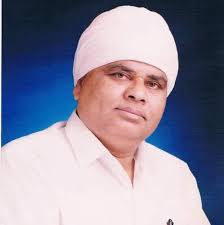

Member of Madhya Pradesh Legislative Assembly
- Incumbent
- Assumed office 3 December 2023
- Preceded by: Raksha Santram Saroniya
- In office 27 November 1998 – 27 November 2003
- Preceded by: Keshri Choudhary
- Succeeded by: Kamlapat Arya
- Constituency: Bhander

Former State President of Bahujan Samaj Party - Madhya Pradesh
- In office 1984–2003
- Appointed by: Kanshi Ram
- Preceded by: office established
- Succeeded by: Dr. P.P. Chaudhary

Personal details
- Born: 1 January 1962 (age 64)
- Party: Indian National Congress
- Other political affiliations: Bahujan Samaj Party (till 2003); Samata Samaj Party (2003-2007); Lok Janshakti Party (2007-2010); Bahujan Sangharsh Dal (2012-2019); Indian National Congress (2019-)
- Spouse: Shakuntala Devi
- Children: 3 (Divyanshu Baraiya, Nidhi Baraiya & Neha Baraiya)

Phool Singh Baraiya is an Indian National Congress politician and member of the Madhya Pradesh Legislative Assembly elected in 2023 from Bhander (SC). He also served as member of the Madhya Pradesh Legislative Assembly in 1998 from Bhander (SC) with the ticket of Bahujan Samaj Party.

In 2024 Lok Sabha Election Phool Singh Baraiya is defeated by BJP's Sandhya Ray by a margin of 64840 votes.

== Early life and education ==
Phool Singh Baraiya was born in 1962 in Bhind, Madhya Pradesh. He completed his Bachelor of Engineering (B.E.) in Mechanical Engineering from Madhav Institute of Technology and Science Gwalior (now part of Jiwaji University) in 1988.

== Political career ==
=== Early political career ===
Phool Singh Baraiya began his political career in the early 1990s with the Bahujan Samaj Party. A close associate of BSP founder Kanshi Ram, Baraiya played a key role in building the party’s organization in Madhya Pradesh. As the state president of the BSP, he led the party to its best-ever performance in the state, winning a record 11 assembly seats in the 1993 and 1998 elections.

In 1998, Baraiya was elected as a Member of the Madhya Pradesh Legislative Assembly from the Bhander (SC) constituency as a BSP candidate. However, ahead of the 2003 assembly elections, he was expelled from the party by BSP President Mayawati following internal differences.

=== Association with the Indian National Congress ===
Baraiya later joined the Indian National Congress. In the 2023 Madhya Pradesh Legislative Assembly election, he contested again from Bhander constituency and won by a margin of 29,438 votes, defeating BJP candidate Ghanshyam Pirouniya.

=== 2024 Lok Sabha election ===
In 2024, he contested the Lok Sabha election from the Bhind (SC) parliamentary constituency on an INC ticket but was defeated by BJP candidate Sandhya Ray by a margin of 64,840 votes.
