= Bhagirath Prasad =

Indian Member of Parliament (born 1947)

Member of Parliament, Lok Sabha
- In office 1 September 2014 – May 2019
- Preceded by: Ashok Argal
- Succeeded by: Sandhya Ray
- Constituency: Bhind

Personal details
- Born: 3 July 1947 (age 79)
- Party: Bharatiya Janata Party
- Other political affiliations: Indian National Congress
- Spouse: Mehrunnisa Parvez
- Children: 4 (Simala Prasad, IPS)
- Education: Jawaharlal Nehru University, Delhi
- Occupation: IAS Officer (Retd).

Bhagirath Prasad (born 3 July 1947; Hindi pronunciation: [bʱaːgiːɾət̪ʰ pɾəsaːd̪]) is an Indian Indian politician, retired Indian Administrative Service (IAS) officer, educationist and former Member of Parliament from the Bhind Lok Sabha constituency in Madhya Pradesh state.

Before entering electoral politics, he served in the Indian Administrative Service for over three decades and later held the office of Vice-Chancellor at several universities in Madhya Pradesh.

== Early life and education ==
Bhagirath Prasad was born on 3 July 1947 in Masoori village, Bhind district, Madhya Pradesh, to Mathura Prasad and Sukrani Prasad. He graduated from Government M.J.S. College, Bhind, obtained a master's degree in political science with a gold medal from Jiwaji University, and later earned M.Phil. and Ph.D. degrees from Jawaharlal Nehru University.

== Civil service career ==
Prasad joined the Indian Administrative Service in the 1975 Madhya Pradesh cadre and served until 2007. Key positions held include:

- Assistant Collector, Bastar (1976–1977)
- Sub-Divisional Magistrate, Dabra, Gwalior (1977–1980)
- Administrator, Municipal Corporation, Gwalior (1980–1982)
- Collector of Ratlam, Jabalpur and Indore (1982–1989)
- Additional Secretary, Housing and Environment, Government of Madhya Pradesh (1989–1991)
- Principal Secretary in various departments including Tribal, SC, OBC and Minority Development (2003); Co-operation (2004); Home (2004–2005); and Higher Education (2005–2007)

Following his retirement from the IAS, he served as Vice-Chancellor of Devi Ahilya Vishwavidyalaya, Barkatullah University, and Dr. Harisingh Gour University.

== Political career ==
Prasad was initially associated with the Indian National Congress. In March 2014, shortly after being announced as the Congress candidate from Bhind, he joined the Bharatiya Janata Party and contested the 2014 Indian general election. He defeated Congress candidate Imarti Devi and was elected to the 16th Lok Sabha from the Bhind constituency.

As a Member of Parliament, he served on the Standing Committee on Human Resource Development, the Committee on the Welfare of Scheduled Castes and Scheduled Tribes, the Committee on Estimates, the Parliament Library Committee and the Consultative Committee of the Ministry of Home Affairs.

== Personal life ==
Prasad is married to Hindi famous author Mehrunnisa Parvez. They have four children, including Simala Prasad, an Indian Police Service officer and actress.
