= Phuphkalan =

- Town
- Nickname: Phoop
- Location in Madhya Pradesh, India Phuphkalan (India)
- Coordinates: 26°38′37″N 78°52′31″E
- Country: India
- State: Madhya Pradesh
- District: Bhind

Phuphkalan (a.k.a. Phoop) is a town and a nagar panchayat in Bhind district in the Indian state of Madhya Pradesh. The town is named after Phoopti Mata whose ancient temple is situated there. It is a group of five small units: Lohriphoop, Andhapura, Badiphoop, Kasapura, and Kariyapura.

== Demographics ==
As of 2001 India census, Phuphkalan had a population of 10,245. Males constitute 55% of the population and females 45%. Phuphkalan has an average literacy rate of 61%, higher than the national average of 59.5%: male literacy is 70%, and female literacy is 50%. In Phuphkalan, 17% of the population is under 6 years of age.
