= Ephraim Union =

Political party in India

The Ephraim Union (EU) is a regional political party in the Indian state of Mizoram. EU belongs to the section in Mizoram that claims that the Mizos are descendants of the ten lost tribes of Israel, and advocates conversion to Judaism. Part of EU's platform is making it easier for Mizos to convert to Judaism and migrate to Israel.

EU also claims that the leaders of Mizoram (the former Mizo Union) had signed a contract stating that Mizoram would be a part of India for only ten years, at the time of Independence in 1947. EU does not present any evidence proving this position.

In the state assembly elections in 2003 EU had put up three candidates (out of 40 in total in the state). Together they mustered 123 votes.

In the Lok Sabha elections in 1999 EU put up a candidate in the only constituency in Mizoram. The candidate got 1,578 votes (0,54% of votes in Mizoram). In the 2004 Lok Sabha elections the party fared better, and the party candidate Tlangdingliana got 6,512 votes (1,87% of votes in the state).

== See also ==
- Bnei Menashe
