= 1999 Indian general election in Delhi =

General election in India

1999 Indian general election in the National Capital Territory of Delhi
- 5 September 1999

7 seats
- Turnout: 43.5%
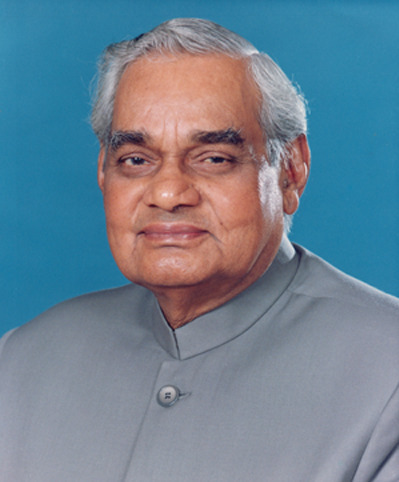

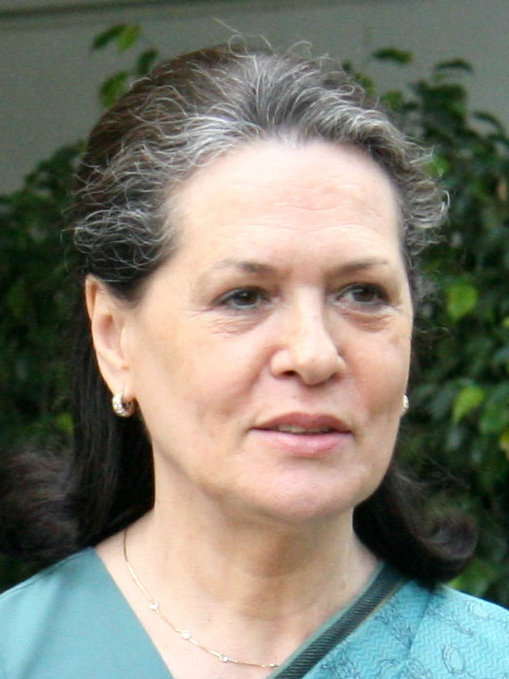
	First party	Second party
Leader	Atal Bihari Vajpayee	Sonia Gandhi
Party	BJP	INC
Seats won	7	0
Seat change	▲1	▼1
Popular vote	1,963,125	1,591,682
Percentage	51.75%	41.96%
Swing	▲1.02 pp	▼0.68 pp
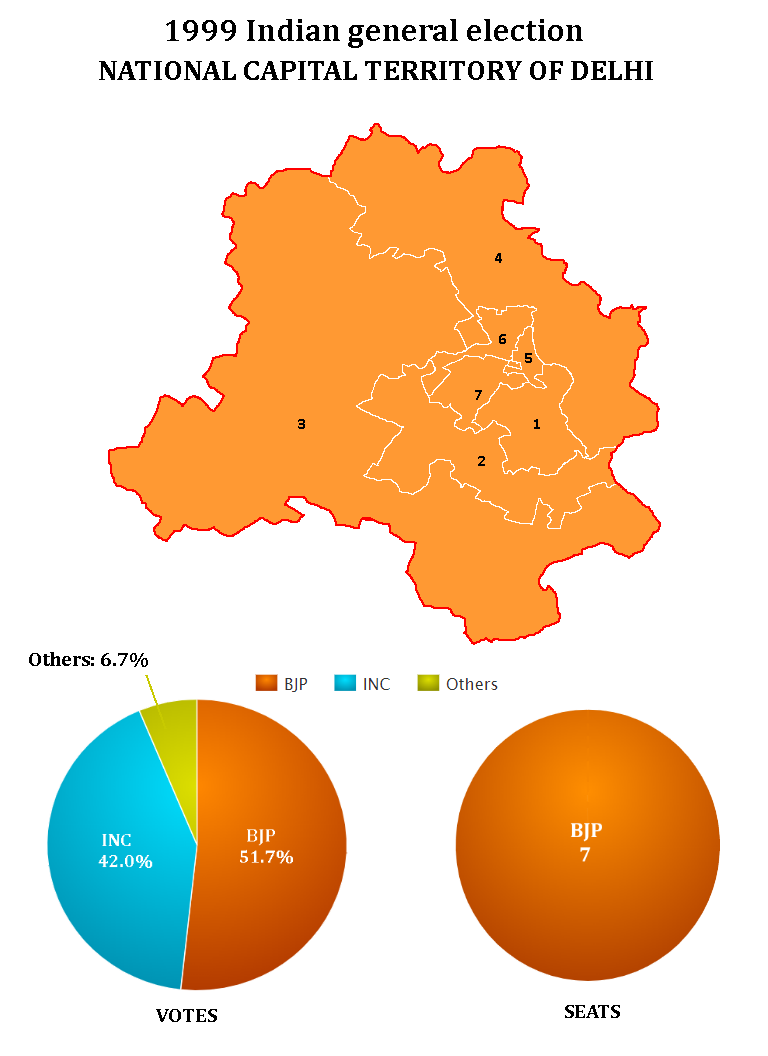
- Delhi
Prime Minister before election
A. B. Vajpayee
BJP
Prime Minister after election
A. B. Vajpayee
BJP

The 1999 Indian general election in Delhi was held to elect representatives of all the 7 seats of the NCT of Delhi in the Lok Sabha.

The Bharatiya Janata Party won all the 7 Lok Sabha seats allotted to the union territory.

== Election schedule ==
The polling schedule for the 1999 General Elections was announced by the Chief Election Commissioner on 11 July 1999.

Poll event	Phase
Poll event	I
Notification date	11 August 1999
Last date for filing nomination	18 August 1999
Scrutiny of nomination	19 August 1999
Last Date for withdrawal of nomination	21 August 1999
Date of poll	5 September 1999
Date of counting of votes/Result	6 October 1999

== Parties and alliances ==
=== National Democratic Alliance ===
No.	Party	Flag	Symbol	Leader	Seats contested
1.	Bharatiya Janata Party			A. B. Vajpayee	7

=== Indian National Congress ===
No.	Party	Flag	Symbol	Leader	Seats contested
1.	Indian National Congress			Sonia Gandhi	7

== Results by Party ==
Party Name	Popular vote			Seats		
Party Name	Votes	%	±pp	Contested	Won	+/−
BJP	19,63,125	51.75	▲1.02	7	7	▲1
INC	15,91,682	41.96	▼0.68	7	0	▼1
BSP	85,017	2.24	▼0.10	3	0	Steady
JD(S)	52,721	1.39	Steady	1	0	Steady
NCP	6,367	0.17	Steady	6	0	Steady
Others	30,903	0.80	Steady	21	0	Steady
IND	63,673	1.68	▲1.17	52	0	Steady
Total	37,93,488	100%	-	97	7	-

== List of Elected MPs ==
Constituency			Winner				Runner Up				Margin	%
#	Name	Poll %	Candidate	Party	Votes	%	Candidate	Party	Votes	%	Margin	%
1	New Delhi	41.78%	Jagmohan	BJP	1,24,626	54.96	R. K. Dhawan	INC	96,733	42.66	27,893	12.30
2	South Delhi	41.87%	Vijay Malhotra	BJP	2,61,230	52.25	Manmohan Singh	INC	2,31,231	46.25	29,999	6.00
3	Outer Delhi	41.49%	Sahib Verma	BJP	7,09,692	55.12	Deep Chand Sharma	INC	5,07,220	39.40	2,02,472	15.72
4	East Delhi	43.37%	Lal Bihari Tiwari	BJP	5,21,434	50.22	H. L. Kapur	INC	4,38,674	42.25	82,760	7.97
5	Chandni Chowk	54.28%	Vijay Goel	BJP	74,001	36.19	Jai Prakash	INC	72,006	35.22	1,995	0.97
6	Delhi Sadar	52.54%	Madan Lal Khurana	BJP	1,43,186	51.45	Jagdish Tytler	INC	1,29,316	46.47	13,870	4.98
7	Karol Bagh (SC)	45.19%	Anita Arya	BJP	1,28,956	49.93	Meira Kumar	INC	1,16,502	45.10	12,454	4.83

== Post-election Union Council of Ministers from Delhi ==
#	Name	Constituency	Designation	Department	From	To	Party
1	Jag Mohan	New Delhi	Cabinet Minister	Urban Development	13 Oct 1999	22 Nov 1999	BJP
1	Jag Mohan	New Delhi	Cabinet Minister	Urban Employment and Poverty Alleviation	22 Nov 1999	26 Nov 1999	BJP
1	Jag Mohan	New Delhi	Cabinet Minister	Urban Development	26 Nov 1999	27 May 2000	BJP
1	Jag Mohan	New Delhi	Cabinet Minister	Urban Development and Poverty Alleviation	27 May 2000	1 Sept 2001	BJP
1	Jag Mohan	New Delhi	Cabinet Minister	Statistics and Programme Implementation	1 Sept 2001	18 Nov 2001	BJP
1	Jag Mohan	New Delhi	Cabinet Minister	Tourism	1 Sept 2001	18 Nov 2001	BJP
1	Jag Mohan	New Delhi	Cabinet Minister	Tourism and Culture	18 Nov 2001	22 May 2004	BJP
2	Sahib Singh Verma	Outer Delhi	Cabinet Minister	Labour	1 July 2002	22 May 2004	BJP
3	Vijay Goel	Chandni Chowk	MoS	Planning	1 Sept 2001	2 Nov 2001	BJP
3	Vijay Goel	Chandni Chowk	MoS	Prime Minister's Office	1 Sept 2001	29 Jan 2003	BJP
3	Vijay Goel	Chandni Chowk	MoS	Statistics and Programme Implementation	1 July 2002	29 Jan 2003	BJP
3	Vijay Goel	Chandni Chowk	MoS	Labour	29 Jan 2003	24 May 2003	BJP
3	Vijay Goel	Chandni Chowk	MoS	Parliamentary Affairs	29 Jan 2003	24 May 2003	BJP
3	Vijay Goel	Chandni Chowk	MoS	Youth Affairs and Sports	29 Jan 2003	22 May 2004	BJP
