= Ram Lakhan Singh =

Indian politician

Member of Parliament, Lok Sabha
- In office 1996-2009
- Preceded by: Yoganand Saraswati
- Succeeded by: Ashok Chhaviram Argal
- Constituency: Bhind

Personal details
- Born: 20 December 1950 (age 75) Madhupura, Bhind District, Madhya Pradesh
- Party: Bharatiya Janata Party
- Other political affiliations: Bahujan Samaj Party
- Spouse: Sarita Singh

Ram Lakhan Singh is an Indian politician. He was elected to the Lok Sabha, lower house of the Parliament of India from the Bhind constituency of Madhya Pradesh as a member of the Bharatiya Janata Party.
