= Samata Samaj Party =

Political party in India

- Abbreviation: SSP
- Leader: Phool Singh Baraiya
- President: Phool Singh Baraiya
- Founded: 30 October 2003
- Dissolved: 7 July 2004
- Split from: Bahujan Samaj Party
- Merged into: Lok Janshakti Party

The Samata Samaj Party (SSP) was a political party in India. It was formed on 30 October 2003 by Phool Singh Baraiya, the former Madhya Pradesh State President of the Bahujan Samaj Party (BSP), after he was expelled from that party.

== See also ==
- Bahujan Samaj Party
- Samata Party
- List of political parties in India
