= Hemant Katare =

Indian politician

Deputy Leader of Opposition
- Incumbent
- Assumed office 16 December 2023

Member of the Madhya Pradesh Legislative Assembly
- In office 2017–2018
- Preceded by: Satyadev Katare
- Constituency: Ater
- Incumbent
- Assumed office 2023

Personal details
- Born: 3 December 1985 (age 40) Manepura, Bhind district
- Party: Indian National Congress
- Parent: Satyadev Katare (father)
- Occupation: politician
- As of 23 July, 2018 Source: ["Biography" (PDF). Vidhan Sabha, Madhya Pradesh Legislative Assembly.]

Hemant Katare is a politician from Madhya Pradesh, India. He is a MLA from Ater (Vidhan Sabha constituency). He is a son of former Home Minister and Leader of opposition of M.P. Late shri Satyadev Katare. He is now the deputy leader of opposition in Madhya Pradesh Legislative Assembly.

== Personal life ==
He is the son of former Madhya Pradesh leader of opposition Satyadev Katare.

== Legal affairs ==
Bhopal police booked the former Congress MLA for allegedly abducting, raping a journalism student. After a series of rape allegations against him, the MLA claimed that the complainant was blackmailing him. Later same woman confessed that BJP leader made her file a false rape case against him. Katare who stands accused of targeting and assaulting a Dalit was absconding for a while. He surrendered before the court in April and was granted bail on furnishing a personal bond of Rs. 100,000.
