= Mehgaon Assembly constituency =

Assembly constituency in Madhya Pradesh

Coordinates: 26.49°N 78.61°E

Mehgaon
- Constituency No. 12 for the Madhya Pradesh Legislative Assembly

Constituency details
- Country: India
- Region: Central India
- State: Madhya Pradesh
- District: Bhind
- Lok Sabha constituency: Bhind
- Established: 1951
- Reservation: None

Member of Legislative Assembly
- 16th Madhya Pradesh Legislative Assembly
- Incumbent Rakesh Shukla
- Party: Bharatiya Janata Party
- Elected year: 2023
- Preceded by: O. P. S. Bhadoria

Mehgaon Assembly constituency is one of the 230 Vidhan Sabha (Legislative Assembly) constituencies of Madhya Pradesh state in central India. This constituency came into existence in 1951, as Gohad Mehgaon, one of the 230 Vidhan Sabha constituencies of the erstwhile Madhya Bharat Madhya Pradesh state.

== Overview ==
Mehgaon (constituency number 12) is one of the 5 Vidhan Sabha constituencies located in Bhind district. This constituency covers the entire Mehgaon tehsil and part of Raun tehsil.

Mehgaon is part of Bhind Lok Sabha constituency along with seven other Vidhan Sabha constituencies, namely, Ater, Bhind, Lahar and Gohad in this district and Sewda, Bhander and Datia in Datia district.

== Members of Legislative Assembly ==
Madhya Pradesh Legislative Assembly
Year	Member	Party
1957	Yugalkishore Ramkishore	Praja Socialist Party
1962	Ramdhan Singh	Indian National Congress
1967	Rai Singh Bhadoria	Bharatiya Jana Sangh
1972	Rameshwardayal Dantre	Samyukta Socialist Party
1977	Rameshwardayal Dantre	Janata Party
1980	Rai Singh Bhadoriya	Independent politician
1985	Rustam Singh	Indian National Congress
1990	Hari Singh Narwaria	Indian National Congress
1993	Naresh Singh Gurjar	Bahujan Samaj Party
1998	Rakesh Shukla	Bharatiya Janata Party
2003	Munna Singh Narwaria	Independent politician
2008	Rakesh Shukla	Bharatiya Janata Party
2013	Chaudhary Mukesh Singh Chaturvedi	Bharatiya Janata Party
2018	O. P. S. Bhadoria	Indian National Congress
2020 (by election)	O. P. S. Bhadoria	Bharatiya Janata Party
2023	Rakesh Shukla	Bharatiya Janata Party

== Election results ==
=== 2023 ===
2023 Madhya Pradesh Legislative Assembly election: Mehgaon
Party	Candidate	Votes	%	±%
BJP	Rakesh Shukla	87,153	48.01	▲2.86
INC	Rahul Singh Bhadoria	65,143	35.89	▼1.88
BSP	Rajbeer	19,506	10.75	▼2.93
ASP(KR)	Bhupendra Karana	4,488	2.47	
AAP	Satendra Bhadoriya (Lovely)	1,825	1.01	
NOTA	None of the above	905	0.5	▲0.39
Majority		22,010	12.12	▲4.74
Turnout		181,531	64.88	▲3.17
BJP hold		Swing		

=== 2020 bypolls ===
2020 Madhya Pradesh Legislative Assembly by-elections: Mehgaon
Party	Candidate	Votes	%	±%
BJP	O. P. S. Bhadoria	73,599	45.15	+23.14
INC	Hemant Satyadev Katare	61,563	37.77	−0.13
BSP	Yogesh Meghsingh Narwariya	22,305	13.68	+9.00
NOTA	None of the above	179	0.11	−0.06
Majority		12,036	7.38	−8.51
Turnout		163,006	61.71	−1.98
BJP gain from INC		Swing		

=== 2018 ===
2018 Madhya Pradesh Legislative Assembly election: Mehgaon
Party	Candidate	Votes	%	±%
INC	O. P. S. Bhadoria	61,560	37.9	
BJP	Rakesh Shukla	35,746	22.01	
Bahujan Sangharsh Dal	Ranjeet Singh Gurjar	28,160	17.34	
RLSP	Rajkumar Singh Kushwah	15,307	9.42	
BSP	Kaushal Tiwari	7,597	4.68	
SP	Suresh Singh Sikarwar	6,151	3.79	
NOTA	None of the above	283	0.17	
Majority		25,814	15.89	
Turnout		162,410	63.69	
INC gain from BJP		Swing		
