= Akoda =

Akoda Phulera
- Village
- Location in Dist: jaipur (Rajasthan), India
- Country: India
- State: Rajasthan
- District: Jaipur

Government
  - Type: panchayat

Languages
  - Official: Hindi
- Time zone: UTC+5:30 (IST)
- Postal code: 303338
- ISO 3166 code: IN-MP
- Vehicle registration: RJ-

Akoda is a town and a gram panchayat in Jaipur district near the town didwana in the state of Rajasthan, India.

== Demographics ==
As of 2001 India census, Akoda had a population of 11,034. Males constitute 55% of the population and females 45%. Akoda has an average literacy rate of 56%, lower than the national average of 59.5%; with 66% of the males and 34% of females literate. 18% of the population is under 10 years of age.

According to category wise population of Akoda has Scheduled Caste and schedule tribes are 45% (Bairwa, Parewa, Meena Raiger etc.) other backward class 26% (Jaat, Kumawat, Sain etc.) General 5% (Brahman, Jain and Chouhan) SBC 22% (Gurjar) and 2% Others.
