= Satyadev Katare =

Indian politician

- Born: 15 February 1955; Manepura, Bhind, Madhya Pradesh
- Died: 20 October 2016 (aged 61); Mumbai, Maharashtra
- Occupation: Politician
- Political party: Indian National Congress
- Spouse: Meera Katare
- Children: Hemant Katare; Yogesh Katare; Manisha Katare

Satyadev Katare was an Indian politician who served as Home Minister of Madhya Pradesh, four-time Member of the Legislative Assembly for Ater, and Leader of Opposition in the Madhya Pradesh Legislative Assembly. Katare died on 20 October 2016 in Mumbai, Maharashtra.
