= Bhind =

- City
- Bhind
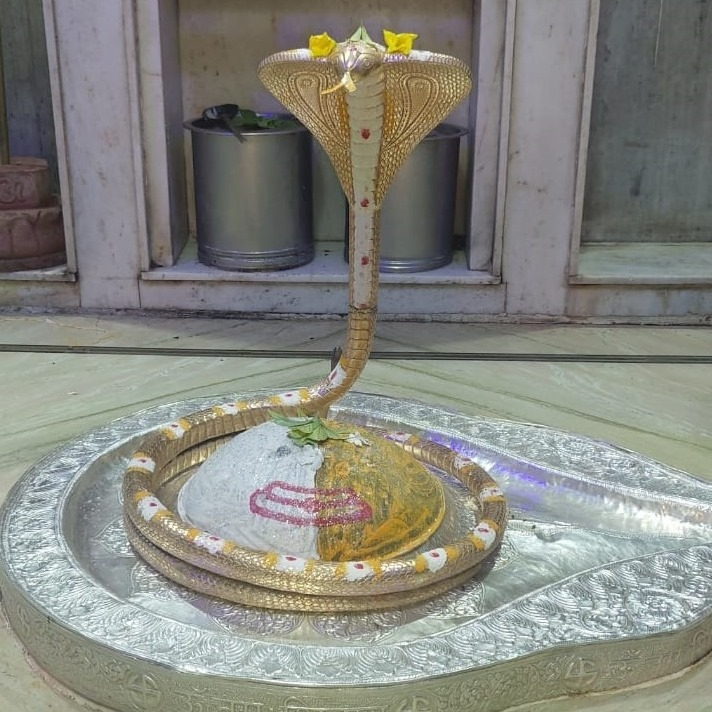
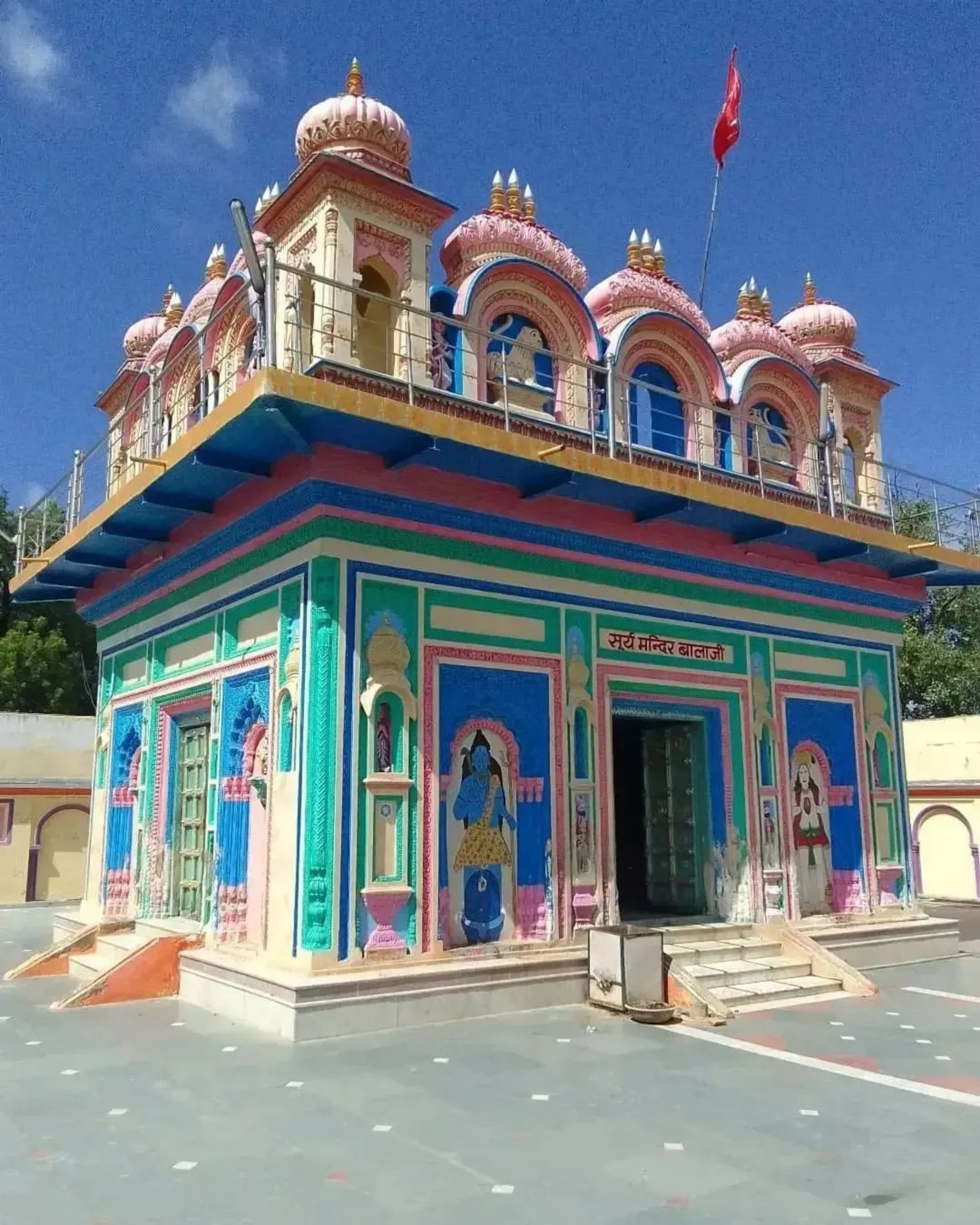
- Bankhandeshwar Mahadev Bhind, Balaji Surya Mandir, Bhind

- Location in Madhya Pradesh, India
- Coordinates: 26°33′53″N 78°47′11″E
- Country: India
- State: Madhya Pradesh
- District: Bhind
- Region: Bundelkhand
- Division: Chambal
- Founder: Chedi Kingdom

Government
  - Type: MP
  - Body: Madhya Pradesh Legislative Assembly

Area
  - Total: 82 km^{2} (32 sq mi)

Population (2011)
  - Total: 197,585
  - Density: 2,400/km^{2} (6,200/sq mi)

Language
  - Official: Hindi, Bundeli
- Time zone: UTC+5:30 (IST)
- PIN: 477001, 477105
- Telephone code: 07534
- Vehicle registration: MP-30
- Website: bhind.nic.in

Bhind is a city in the Indian state of Madhya Pradesh. It is the headquarters of the Bhind district.

== Geography ==
Bhind is located at 26.55°N 78.78°E. It has an average elevation of 474 metres (1555 ft).

== Demographics ==
As of 2011 Indian Census, Bhind had a total population of 197,585, of which 105,352 were males and 92,233 were females. Population within the age group of 0 to 6 years was 25,358. The total number of literates in Bhind was 142,923, which constituted 72.3% of the population with male literacy of 77.9% and female literacy of 65.9%. The effective literacy rate of 7+ population of Bhind was 83.0%, of which male literacy rate was 89.6% and female literacy rate was 75.4%. The Scheduled Castes and Scheduled Tribes population was 39,267 and 1,832 respectively. Bhind had 33592 households in 2011.

As of 2001 India census, Bhind had a population of 153,768. Males constitute 54% of the population.

== Place of interest ==
- Ater Fort, it was built by Bhadauria kings Badan Singh, Maha Singh and Bakhat Singh between 1664 and 1668.
- Vankhandeshwar Temple: It is located in Bhind town. It is a Shiv Mandir built by the king, Prathwiraj Chauhan in 1175 AD. It is told that "Jyoti" is continuously flamed since then.

== Notable personalities ==
- Satendra Singh Lohiya, Indian swimmer
- Arvind Singh Bhadoria, Indian Politician
- Bhagirath Prasad, Retd. Indian Administrative Service Officer, Ex. Lok Sabha MP. & Ex. Vice Chancellor DAVV Indore
- Chaudhary Rakesh Singh Chaturvedi, Indian Politician
- Lal Singh Arya, Former Minister MP Govt., National President BJP SC Morcha.

== Transportation ==
- Bhind railway station is main station of city, major trains halt here.

Nearest Airport is Gwalior Airport
