= After =

After may refer to:

== Literature ==
- After (Elgar), an 1895 poem by Philip Bourke Marston set to music by Edward Elgar
- After (Prose novel), a 2003 novel by Francine Prose
- After (Chalifour book), a 2005 book by Canadian writer Francis Chalifour
- After (Todd novel), a 2013 novel by Anna Todd
- After: A Doctor Explores What Near-Death Experiences Reveal about Life and Beyond, a 2021 book by Bruce Greyson

== Music ==
- After (band)
- After (Elgar), a poem by P. B. Marston set to music by Edward Elgar, 1895
- After (Ihsahn album), 2010
- After (Lady Lamb album), 2015
- After (Mount Eerie album), 2018
- After, a 1995 album by Sammi Cheng
- "After", a 2011 song by Moby from Destroyed
- "After", a 2023 song by Pabllo Vittar from Noitada
- "After", a 2014 song by Amy Lee featuring Dave Eggar from the album Aftermath
- "After", a 2017 song by MUNA from the album About U

== TV and film ==
- After (2009 film), a Spanish drama film
- After (2012 film), a sci-fi thriller film written and directed by Ryan Smith
- After, a 2012 film starring Julie Gayet
- After (2019 film), an American film, based on the 2013 book
- "After" (The Handmaid's Tale), a television episode
- "After" (The Walking Dead), a television episode

== Other ==
- After... (video game), a 2003 eroge visual novel
- After, in naval terminology, an adjective for distinguishing parts of a ship nearer the aft
- After (art), term included in an inscription to indicate that a work was modeled on the work of another artist

== See also ==
- Arter, eye dialect spelling of "after"
- "Afterward", a 1910 short story by Edith Wharton
- After 7 (disambiguation)
- Ater (disambiguation)
- Later (disambiguation)
