= Ater =

Ater may refer to:

== People and biblical figures ==
- Al Ater (1953–2017), an American politician
- Ater Majok (born 1987), a professional basketball player
- One or two individuals in the Bible - see List of minor Hebrew Bible figures, A–K

== Places ==
- Ater tehsil in Bhind District, India
  - Ater Assembly constituency
  - Ater Fort
- Attert (Walloon: Ater), a municipality of Wallonia in the province of Luxembourg, Belgium
- Ater, Texas, an unincorporated community in Coryell County

== See also ==
- Attaché Temporaire d'Enseignement et de Recherche (ATER), a type of teaching and research fellow in French higher education
- A. ater
- After
