= 1901 in British music =

This is a summary of 1901 in music in the United Kingdom.

== Events ==
- 1 January – The ballet Soldiers of the Queen, with 250 costumed dancers representing the Queen’s parade, opens at the Alhambra Theatre in London. It is a huge success, fueled by the patriotism surrounding the Boar War.
- 14 March – The String Quartet in B flat by Frank Bridge is performed for the first time at the Royal College of Music, London. It won the Sullivan Prize.
- 21 March – Tritons a piece for orchestra by the 21 year-old John Ireland, is performed for the first time in Alexandra House, London, conducted by Charles Villiers Stanford.
- 27 March – The Symphony No 4, Greeting to the New Century by William Wallace, is given its first performance at the Queen’s Hall, London.
- 4 April – The Serenade for small orchestra by Ralph Vaughan Williams is performed for the first time at the Winter Gardens in Bournemouth.
- April – Lucy Broadwood is a judge at the Westmoreland Festival.
- May – Australian composer Percy Grainger arrives in the UK with his mother, Rose, after a stay in Germany.
- 30 May – Much Ado About Nothing, an opera in four acts by Charles Villiers Stanford, is produced at Covent Garden in London.
- 31 May – The Bechstein Hall, later renamed the Wigmore Hall, opens with a concert featuring Ferruccio Busoni (piano) and Eugène Ysaÿe (violin). Other artists using the hall in the early days include Percy Grainger, Arthur Rubinstein, Camille Saint-Saëns and Max Reger.
- 20 June – At Queen's Hall, Edward Elgar conducts the London Philharmonic Orchestra in the world premiere of his concert-overture Cockaigne (In London Town).
- 22 June – Gustav Holst marries soprano Isobel Harrison at Fulham Register Office.
- 19 October – No 1 and No 2 Pomp and Circumstance Marches, Op. 39 by Edward Elgar are performed for the first time in Liverpool.
- 26 October – the concert overture Toussaint L’Ouverture by Samuel Coleridge-Taylor is performed for the first time in London.
- 29 October – Percy Grainger gives his first solo piano recital in London, at Steinway Hall.
- 7 November – The first performance of Percy Pitt’s Dance Rhythms, op 33, takes place at the Queen's Hall Proms, conducted by Sir Henry Wood.
- 21 November – The Piano Quartet in E minor, op. 12 by Donald Tovey is played for the first time at St James’s Hall in London.
- date unknown
  - John Ireland graduates from the Royal College of Music.
  - Ralph Vaughan Williams formally receives the degree of Doctor of Music from Cambridge University.

== Popular music ==
- "Come, Gentle Night!", words by Clifton Bingham, music by Edward Elgar.
- "In the Dawn", words by A. C. Benson, music by Edward Elgar.

== Classical music: new works ==
- Herbert Brewer – Emmaus
- Frank Bridge
  - Scherzo Phantastick
  - Berceuse for viola or cello and piano
- Samuel Coleridge-Taylor – Idyll
- Edward Elgar – Cockaigne (In London Town)
- Joseph Holbrooke – Queen Mab

== Opera ==
- Frederick Delius – A Village Romeo and Juliet (later revised, not performed until 1907)
- Charles Villiers Stanford – Much Ado About Nothing

== Musical theatre ==
- 17 June – The Toreador, with book by James T. Tanner and Harry Nicholls, music by Ivan Caryll and Lionel Monckton, and lyrics by Adrian Ross and Percy Greenbank, opens at the Gaiety Theatre (later moving to the Comedy Theatre, and runs for 675 performances.
- 18 December – Bluebell in Fairyland, with book by Seymour Hicks, with music by Walter Slaughter and lyrics by Aubrey Hopwood and Charles H. Taylor, opens at the Vaudeville Theatre, and runs for 300 performances.

== Births ==
- 23 May – Edmund Rubbra, composer (died 1986)
- 10 June – Eric Maschwitz (Holt Marvell), lyricist and broadcast executive (died 1969)
- 14 July – Gerald Finzi, composer (died 1956).
- 9 September – James Blades, orchestral percussionist (died 1999)
- 26 December – Victor Hely-Hutchinson, South African-born composer and radio executive (died 1947)
- date unknown – Ivor R. Davies, organist and composer (died 1970)

== Deaths ==
- 11 February – Henry Willis, organ builder, 79
- 31 March – Sir John Stainer, organist and composer, 60
- 3 April – Richard D'Oyly Carte, producer of Gilbert & Sullivan, 56
- 14 April – Alice Barnett, singer and actress, 54
- June – Abel Jones (Bardd Crwst), balladeer, age unknown (born 1830)
- 23 June – Charles Kensington Salaman, pianist and composer, 87
- 22 October – Frederic Archer, organist, conductor and composer, 63

== See also ==
- 1901 in the United Kingdom
