= Mihona =

- Town
- Location in Madhya Pradesh, India Mihona (India)
- Coordinates: 26.28°N 78.98°E
- Country: India
- State: Madhya Pradesh
- District: Bhind

Area
  - Total: 171 km^{2} (66 sq mi)
- Elevation: 154 m (505 ft)

Population (2001)
  - Total: 14,799
  - Density: 86.5/km^{2} (224/sq mi)
- Demonym: Mihonawale

Languages
  - Official: Hindi
- Time zone: UTC+5:30 (IST)
- Postal code: 477441
- ISO 3166 code: IN-MP
- Vehicle registration: MP-30
- Website: bhind.nic.in

Mihona is a town and a Nagar Panchayat in Bhind district in the Indian state of Madhya Pradesh.

== Geography ==
Mihona is located at 26.28°N 78.98°E. It has an average elevation of 154 metres (505 feet).

== Demographics ==
As of 2001 India census, Mihona had a population of 14,799. Males constitute 53% of the population and females 47%. Mihona has an average literacy rate of 65%, higher than the national average of 59.5%: male literacy is 74%, and female literacy is 55%. In Mihona, 15% of the population is under 6 years of age.

== Administration ==
The civic administration of the town is managed by the Mihona Nagar Panchayat and the town is divided into 15 wards.

== List of villages in Mihona ==
1. Achalpura
2. Ahroli
3. Asnehat
4. Badetar
5. Badokhari
6. Badokhri
7. Banthri
8. Banuapura
9. Barehat
10. Barehet
11. Birkhadi
12. Bhakoti
13. Biswari
14. Bohara
15. Chandokh
16. Chachipura
17. Chaklen
18. Dabreha Jagir
19. Daulatpura Sani
20. Dhohar
21. Dhonpura
22. Dolatpura Abbal
23. Dubka
24. Gudha
25. Gurira
26. Hirapura
27. Imalaha
28. Itai
29. Jaganpura
30. Jaitpura Gudha
31. Kakora
32. Kanhai Ka Pura
33. Katha
34. Kathaa
35. Kathghara Mafi
36. Khurd
37. Khurdua
38. Kunwarpura No 1
39. Lalpura
40. Lidhora
41. Lohchara
42. Machhand
43. Machhariya
44. Mahaveerganj
45. Malpura
46. Matiyavali Khurd
47. Matiyawali Bujurg
48. Morkhi
49. Nakara
50. Parrayach
51. Rahawali Behad
52. Rahawali Ubari
53. Rahawli Ubari
54. Ranapura
55. Rajpura
56. Rari Shikarpura
57. Rawatpura Sani
58. Sikari Jagir
59. Singpura
60. Surghan
61. Thanupura

== Education ==
- Govt Gandhi College, Balaji Mihona
