= Op. 31 =

In music, Op. 31 stands for Opus number 31. Compositions that are assigned this number include:

- Alkan – Preludes, Op. 31
- Barber – Summer Music
- Beethoven – Piano Sonata No. 16
- Beethoven – Piano Sonata No. 17
- Beethoven – Piano Sonata No. 18
- Britten – Serenade for Tenor, Horn and Strings
- Chopin – Scherzo No. 2
- Elgar – A Song of Flight
- Elgar – After
- Enescu – Vox Maris
- Farrenc – Piano Quintet No. 2
- Górecki – Symphony No. 2
- Gottschalk – Souvenir de Porto Rico
- Prokofiev – Tales of an Old Grandmother
- Rachmaninoff – Liturgy of St. John Chrysostom
- Saint-Saëns – Le rouet d'Omphale
- Schillings – Mona Lisa
- Schoenberg – Variations for Orchestra
- Schumann – 3 Gesänge
- Tchaikovsky – Marche slave
- Vierne – Vingt-quatre pièces en style libre
