= Kanhai Ka Pura, Madhya Pradesh =

Village in Bhind District, Madhya Pradesh

Kanhai Ka Pura Maharajpura
- Rural
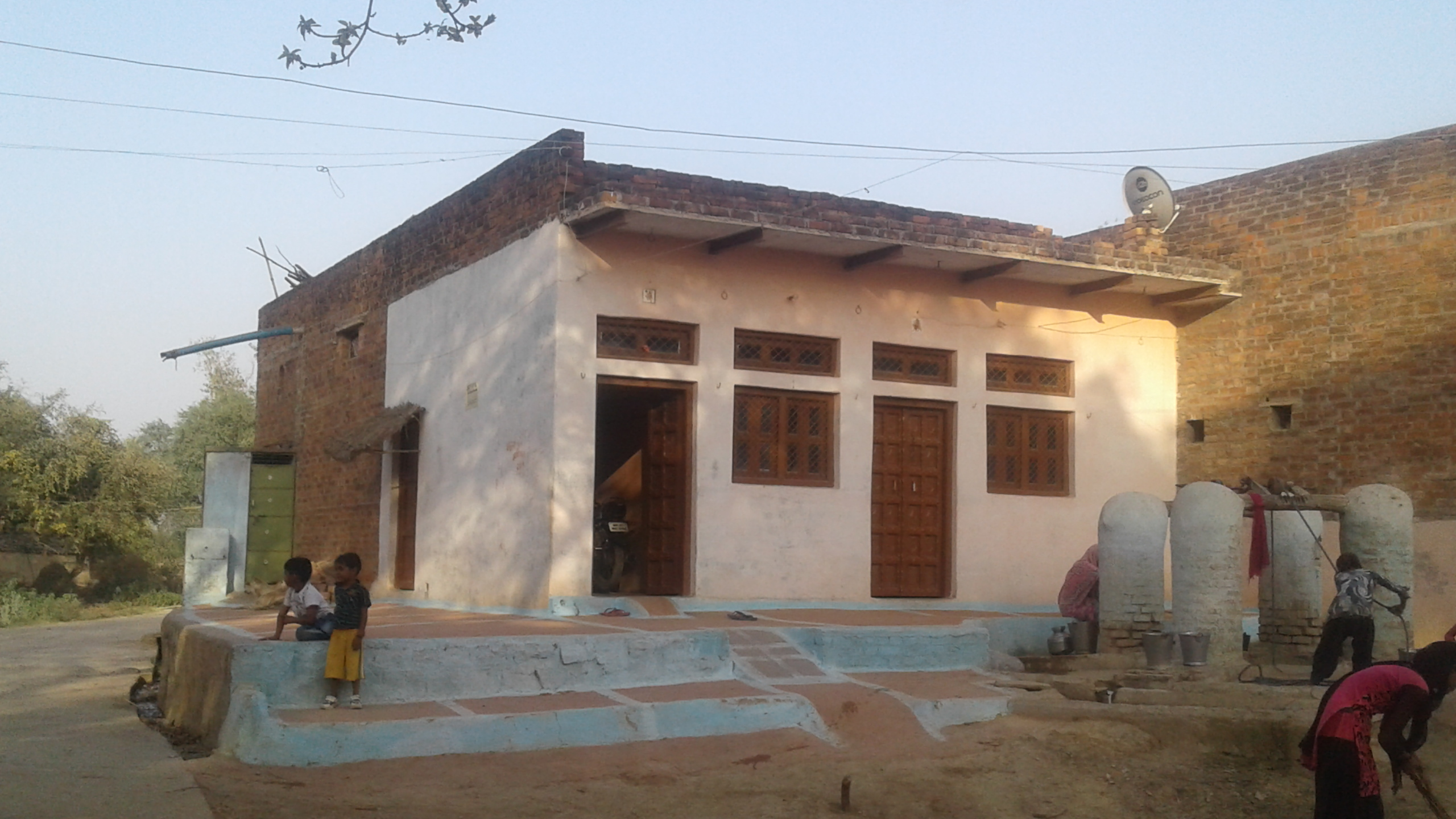

- Location in Madhya Pradesh, India Kanhai Ka Pura (India)
- Coordinates: 26.3016226°N 79.0404649°E
- Country: India
- State: Madhya Pradesh
- District: Bhind
- Block: Roun
- Tehsil: Mihona
- Founded by: Kanhai

Government
  - MLA: Amrish Sharma (Bhartiya Janta Party)
  - DM: Sanjeev Shrivastava
  - Sarpanch: Vibha Rajawat

Area
  - Total: 0.80 km^{2} (0.31 sq mi)
- Elevation: 151 m (495 ft)

Population (2020)
  - Total: 600
- Demonym: Purawale

Languages
  - Official: Hindi
- Time zone: UTC+5:30 (IST)
- PIN: 477441
- Telephone code: 07534
- Vehicle registration: MP-30
- Website: bhind.nic.in

Kanhai Ka Pura is a village in Bhind district and it comes under Surghan Gram Panchayat which comes under Mihona Tehsil and it comes under Lahar Vidhan Sabha. It is an assembly constituency in Bhind district in the Indian state of Madhya Pradesh. As of 2011 India census, Kanhai Ka Pura has a population of over 530.

== Geography ==
Kanhai Ka Pura is located at 26.3016226°N 79.0404649°E.
