= Op. 41 =

In music, Op. 41 stands for Opus number 41. Compositions that are assigned this number include:

- Beethoven - Serenade for Flute (or Violin) and Piano in D major
- York Bowen – Fantasy and Quartet, Op. 41 No. 1 (for 4 violas) and No. 2 (for standard string quartet)
- Brahms – 5 Lieder, Op. 41 (for male chorus)
- Busoni – Turandot Suite
- Chopin – Mazurkas, Op. 41
- Elgar – In the Dawn and Speak, Music!
- Madetoja – The Garden of Death (Kuoleman puutarha), suite for solo piano (1918, revised 1919)
- Mendelssohn – 6 Lieder, Op. 41 (SATB chorus or 4 solo voices)
- Nielsen – Moderen
- Ludolf Nielsen – String Quartet No. 3
- Pierné – Quintette_pour_piano_et_cordes_de_Pierné
- Prokofiev – Le pas d'acier
- Rachmaninoff – Three Russian Songs, Op. 41
- Rimsky-Korsakov – 4 Romances, Op. 41
- Saint-Saëns – Piano Quartet in B♭ major
- Schoenberg – Ode to Napoleon Buonaparte for voice, piano and string quartet, Op. 41
- Schumann – Three String Quartets
- Scriabin – Poème, Op. 41
- Sibelius – Kyllikki, suite for solo piano (1904)
- Smirnov – Tiriel
- R. Strauss – 5 Lieder, Op. 41
- Tchaikovsky – Liturgy of St. John Chrysostom
