= Ripely Pine =

Studio album by Lady Lamb
- Released: February 19, 2013
- Genre: Rock
- Length: 1:01:23
- Label: Ba Da Bing
- Producer: Nadim Issa

Lady Lamb chronology
head is swimming (bedroom recordings) (2012)	Ripely Pine (2013)	After (2015)

Professional ratings
Aggregate scores
Source	Rating
Metacritic	82/100
Review scores
Source	Rating
Consequence of Sound	A−
Pitchfork	7.8/10

Ripely Pine is the debut studio album by American musician Lady Lamb. It was released on February 19, 2013, under Ba Da Bing Records.

== Track listing ==
All tracks are written by Aly Spaltro

No.	Title	Length
1.	"Hair to the Ferris Wheel"	5:23
2.	"Aubergine"	4:12
3.	"Florence Berlin"	4:51
4.	"Bird Balloons"	6:17
5.	"Regarding Ascending The Stairs"	5:30
6.	"You Are The Apple"	7:00
7.	"Mezzanine"	3:43
8.	"Little Brother"	3:22
9.	"Crane Your Neck"	6:28
10.	"Rooftop"	2:56
11.	"The Nothing Part II"	4:31
12.	"Taxidermist, Taxidermist"	7:10
Total length:		61:23

== Personnel ==
Main musicians

- Aly Spaltro – vocals, guitar, bass, banjo, autoharp, omnichord, percussion
- Henry Jamison – bass, backing vocals
- Peter McLaughlin – drums, backing vocals

Production

- Nadim Issa – engineer, mixing, producer
- Drew Guido – assistant engineer
- Joe LaPorta – mastering
- Aly Spaltro – artwork, layout
- Shervin Lainez – photography

Additional musicians

- Walker Adams – drums (track 2)
- Alex Asher – trombone (tracks 1, 2, 6, 7)
- Jeff Beam – backing vocals (track 11)
- Erin 'Dilly Dilly' Davidson – backing vocals (tracks 8, 11)
- Maisie Degoosh – backing vocals (track 11)
- Kaitlynn Gatchell – backing vocals (track 11)
- Drew Guido – melodica (tracks 4) – sythn (tracks 11)
- Wesley Hartley – backing vocals (track 11)
- Emily Hope Price – cello (tracks 7, 10)
- Maria Im – violin (tracks 4, 7)
- Nadim Issa – piano, organ, rhodes, keys, drums (tracks 7, 12), melodica (track 5)
- Maria Jeffers – cello (track 6)
- Cole Kamen-Green – trumpet (track 2)
- Nora Krohn – viola (track 6)
- TJ Metcalf – backing vocals (track 11)
- Brooke Quiggins – violin (track 6)
- Ben Strapp – tuba (tracks 7, 9)
- Elizabeth Taillon – backing vocals (track 11)
- Hannah Tarkison – backing vocals (track 11)
- Melissa Tong – violin (track 6)
