= Music Speaks (disambiguation) =

Music Speaks is a 2014 album by Candice Glover.

Music Speaks, or Music Speaks Louder than Words may refer to:

- Music Speaks Louder Than Words, album by Russian and American musicians, 1990
- Music Speaks Louder Than Words, album by Candi Staton 1977
- Music Speaks Louder Than Words (James Blood Ulmer album), 1997
- And the Music Speaks, album by All-4-One 1995

== See also ==
- Speak, Music!, a 1901 song by Edward Elgar
