= Kripekapura =

- Village
- Location in Madhya Pradesh, India
- Coordinates: 26.56°N 78.45°E
- Country: India
- State: Madhya Pradesh
- District: Bhind
- Elevation: 147 m (482 ft)

Population (2011)
  - Total: 1,286

Languages
  - Official: Hindi
- Time zone: UTC+5:30 (IST)

Kripekapura is a remote Indian village in the Gormi tehsil, Bhind district, in the state of Madhya Pradesh. It is located 350 km south east of Delhi and 77 km north east of Gwalior. The fertile landscape is home to approximately 1286 people (census of 2011), which consist of 688 men, 598 women and 350 children.

== Education ==
The village has one government school which runs from grade 1 to 12. male and Females studying 12 and above. In recent times, some males complete university and find government or private employment. Some people are engineer, doctor, police inspector and army. The remaining population, study until 12th and stay to help their families in the farm.kripekapura is an educated peoples village, where most of population is highly educated .

== Lifestyle ==
The village lifestyle is very simple. There is full electricity and drinking water is collected from pumps and tubewell. The village life revolves around farming and tending to livestock which is the main form of occupation. Majority of the population own farm lands and animals (buffalos and cows) which they use only to collect milk. The day begins before the sun rises by feeding the animals. Once the sun has risen the people travel to their farms and continue their daily routine which depends on the season. The main crops that they grow on their farms include wheat (gēhūm̐), mustard (sarasōṁ), barley (jau), millet (baajara), sesame (til) and some lentils (daal). By midday the heat of the sun in summer prevents further farming as it becomes too hot. The farmers return home to check on their animals, shower and eat lunch. Later in the afternoon they return to their farms. As the sun begins to set and there is not much light to be found, both females and males continue to tend to their animals. Only the females take care of cooking dinner as well as other meals in the day. After dinner, the evening consists of the villagers coming together in a common space to share their experiences. The youth gather around the older members of the community and hear the traditional folk stories. In order to start their early morning work majority of the population sleep early.

== Gallery ==
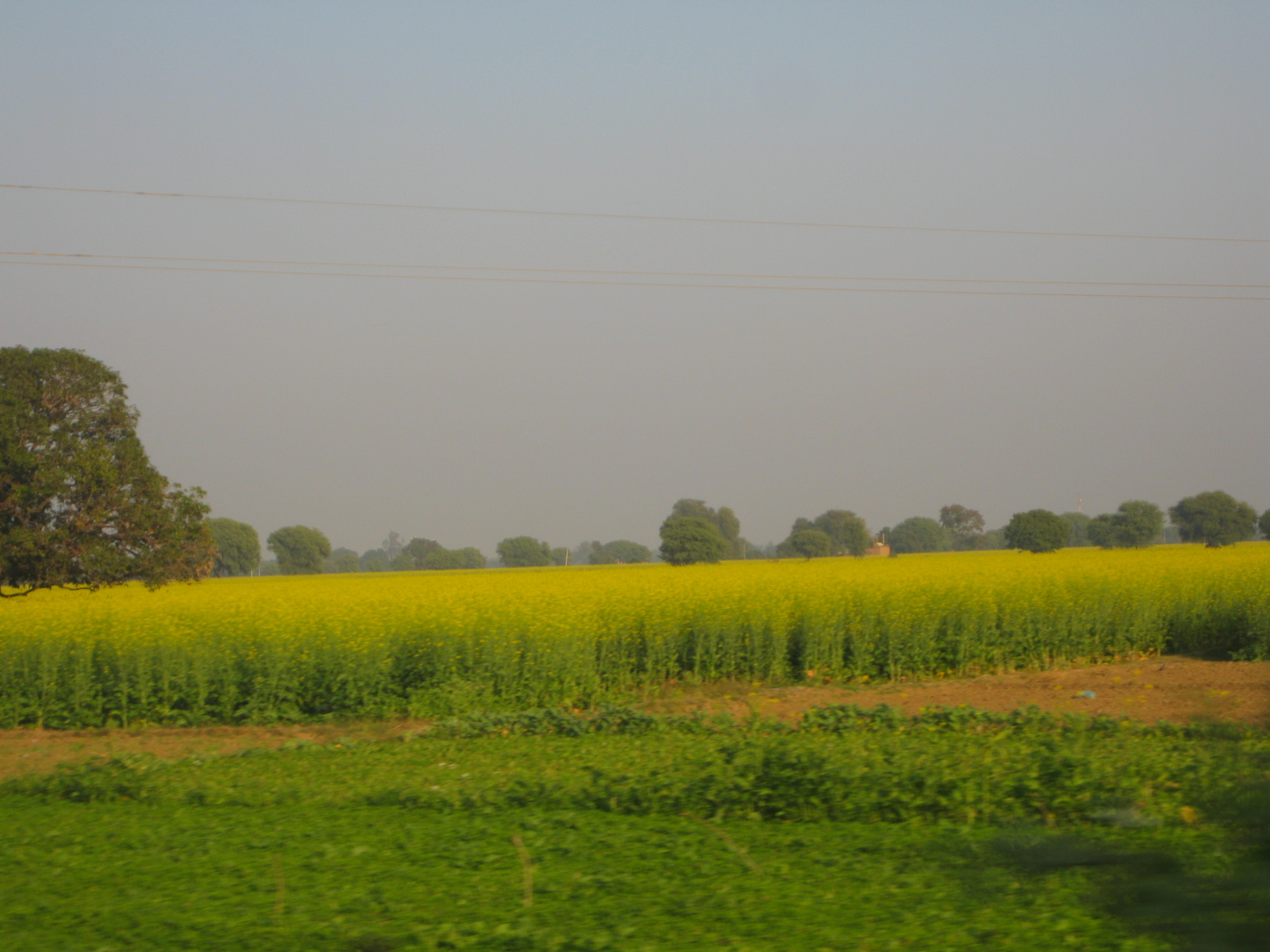
Mustard farms

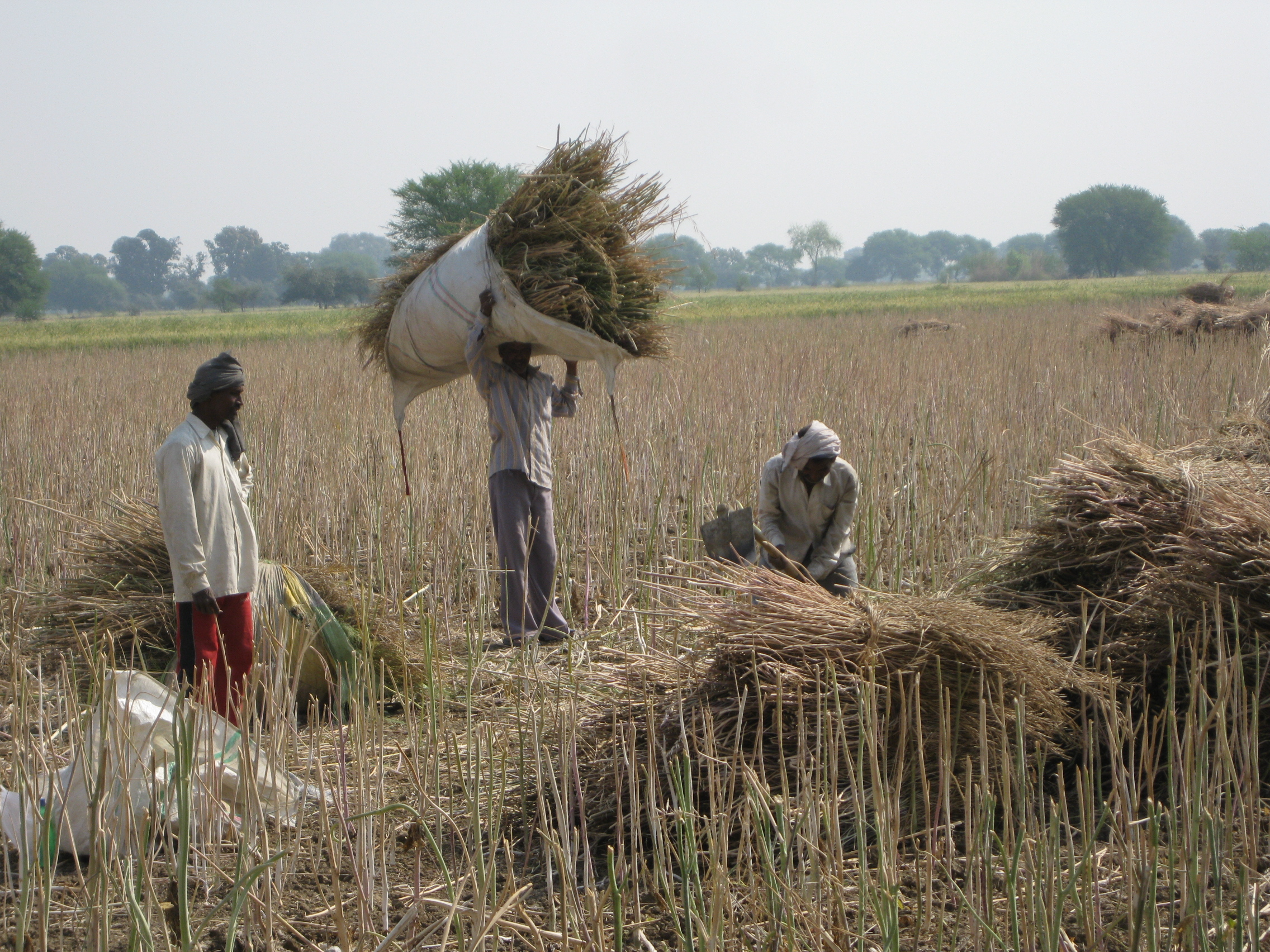
People working in farms

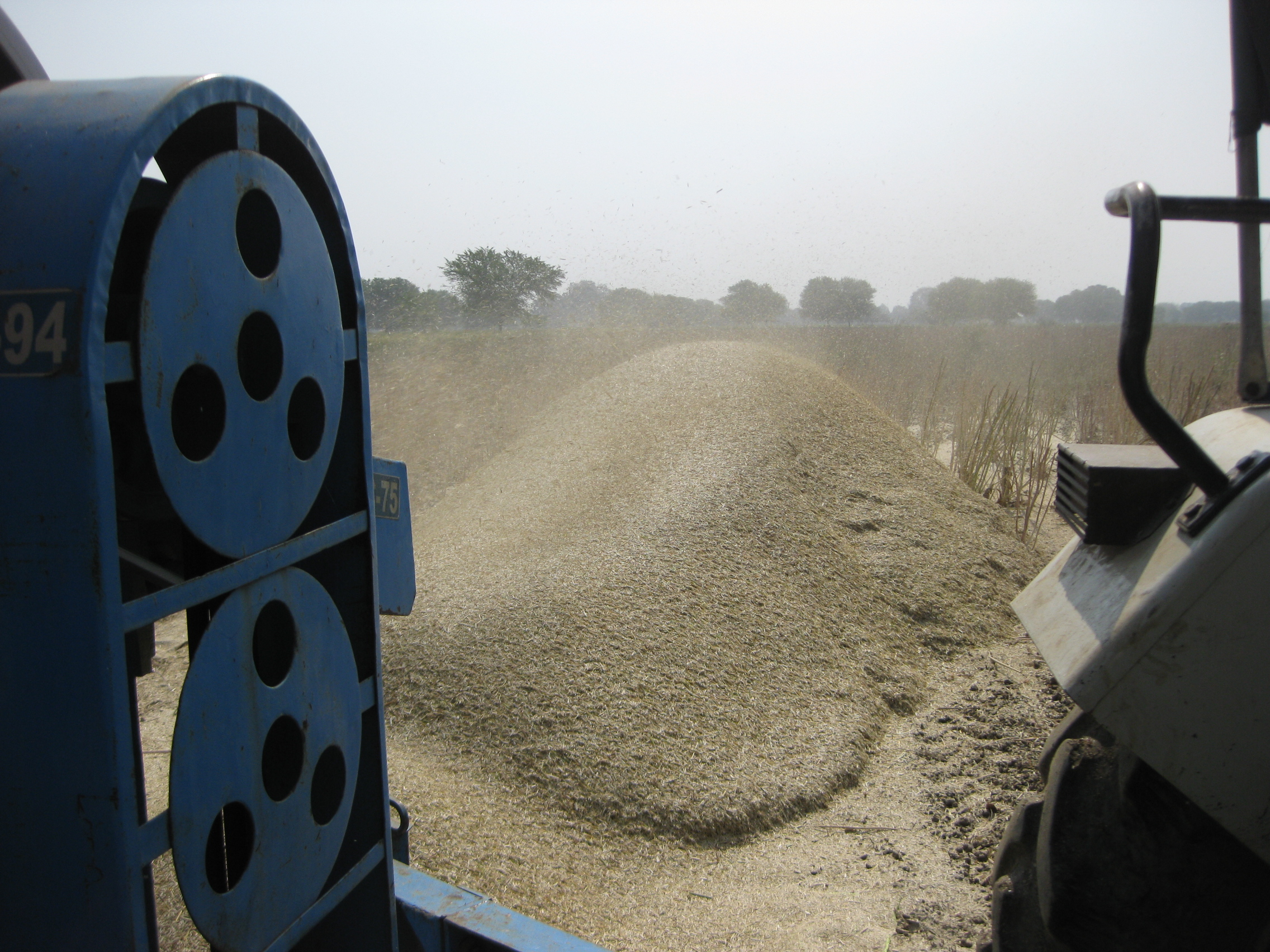
Kripekapura harvesting mustard farms

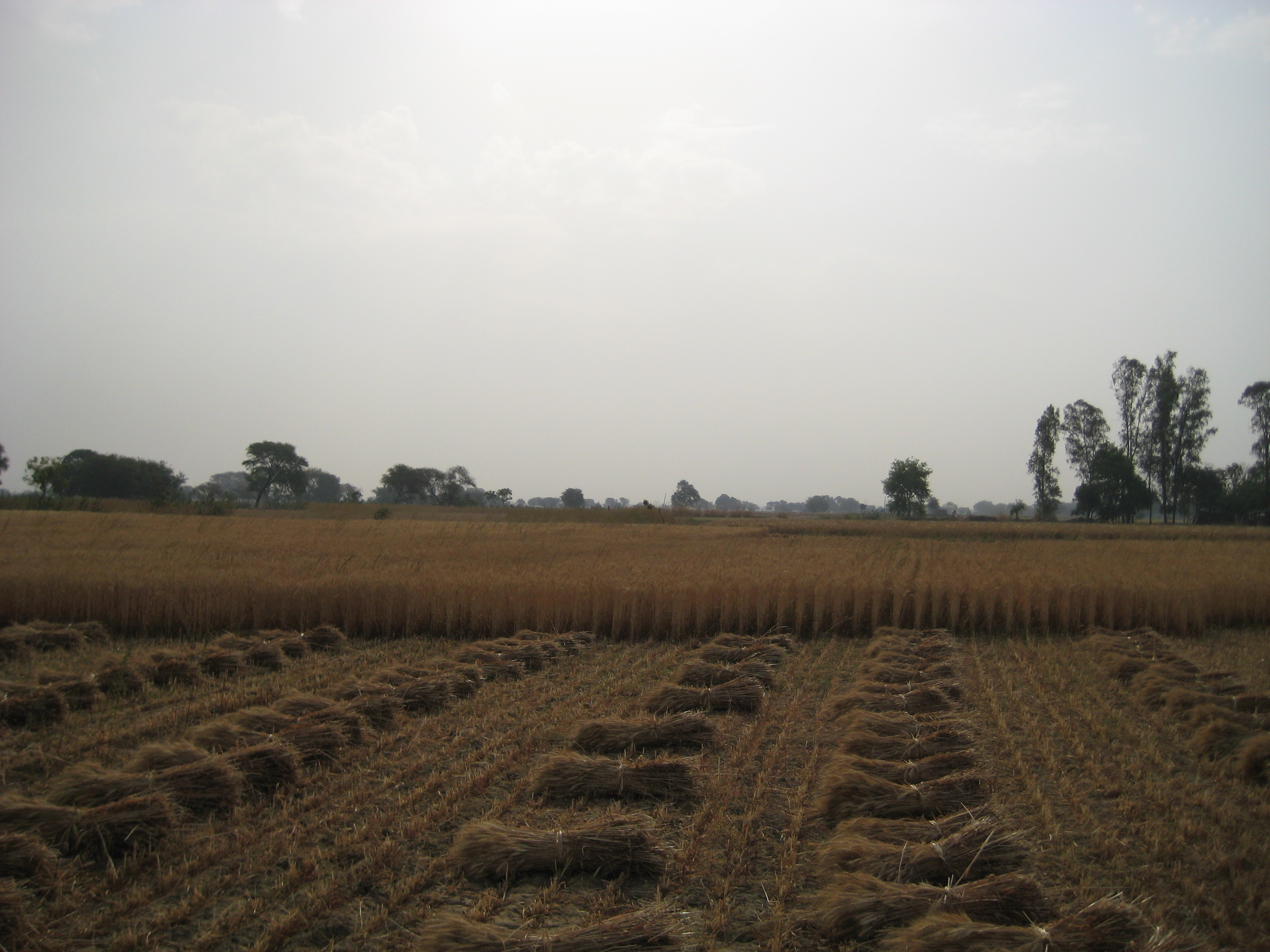
Kripekapura wheat farms

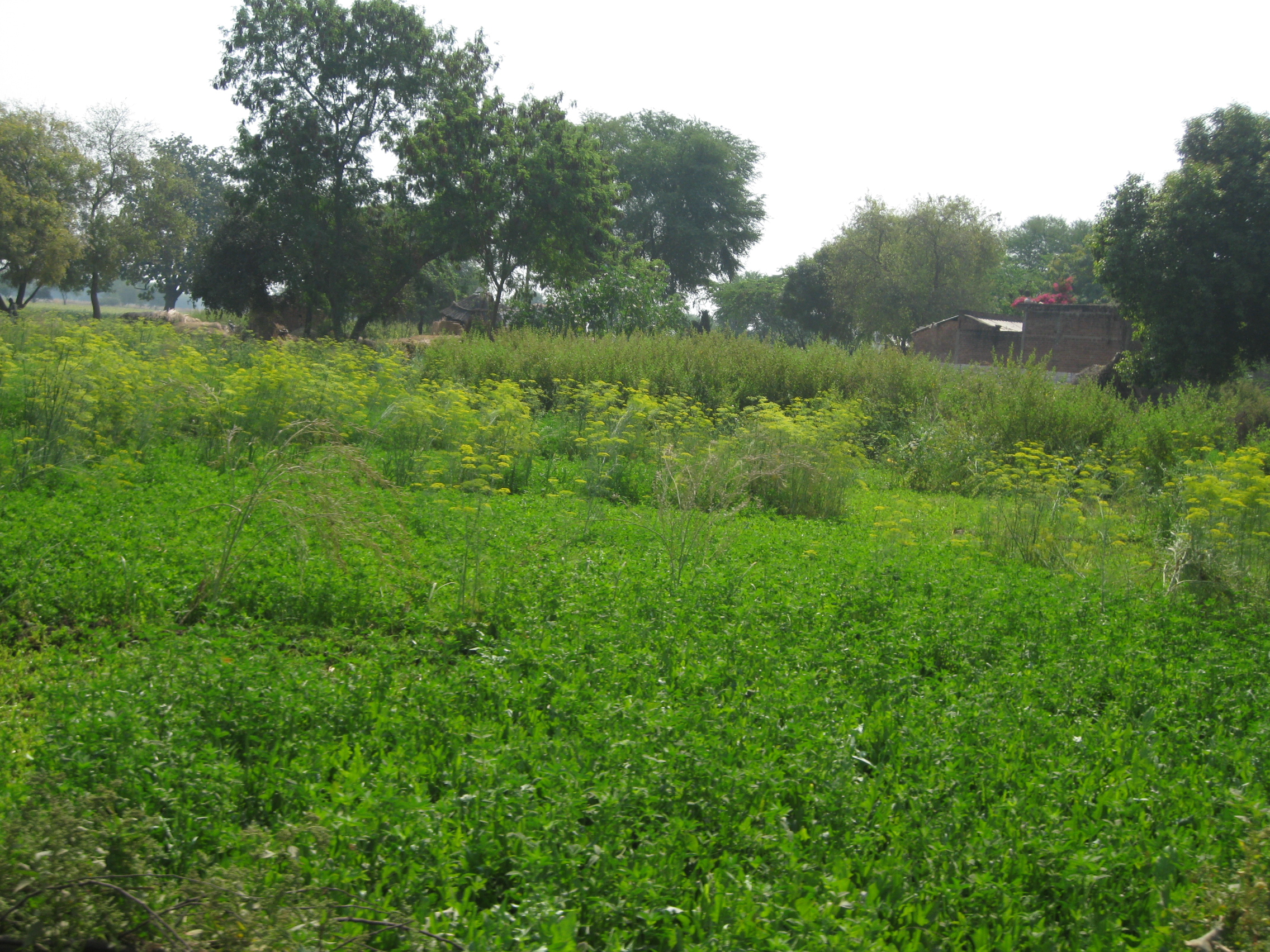
Kripekapura farms

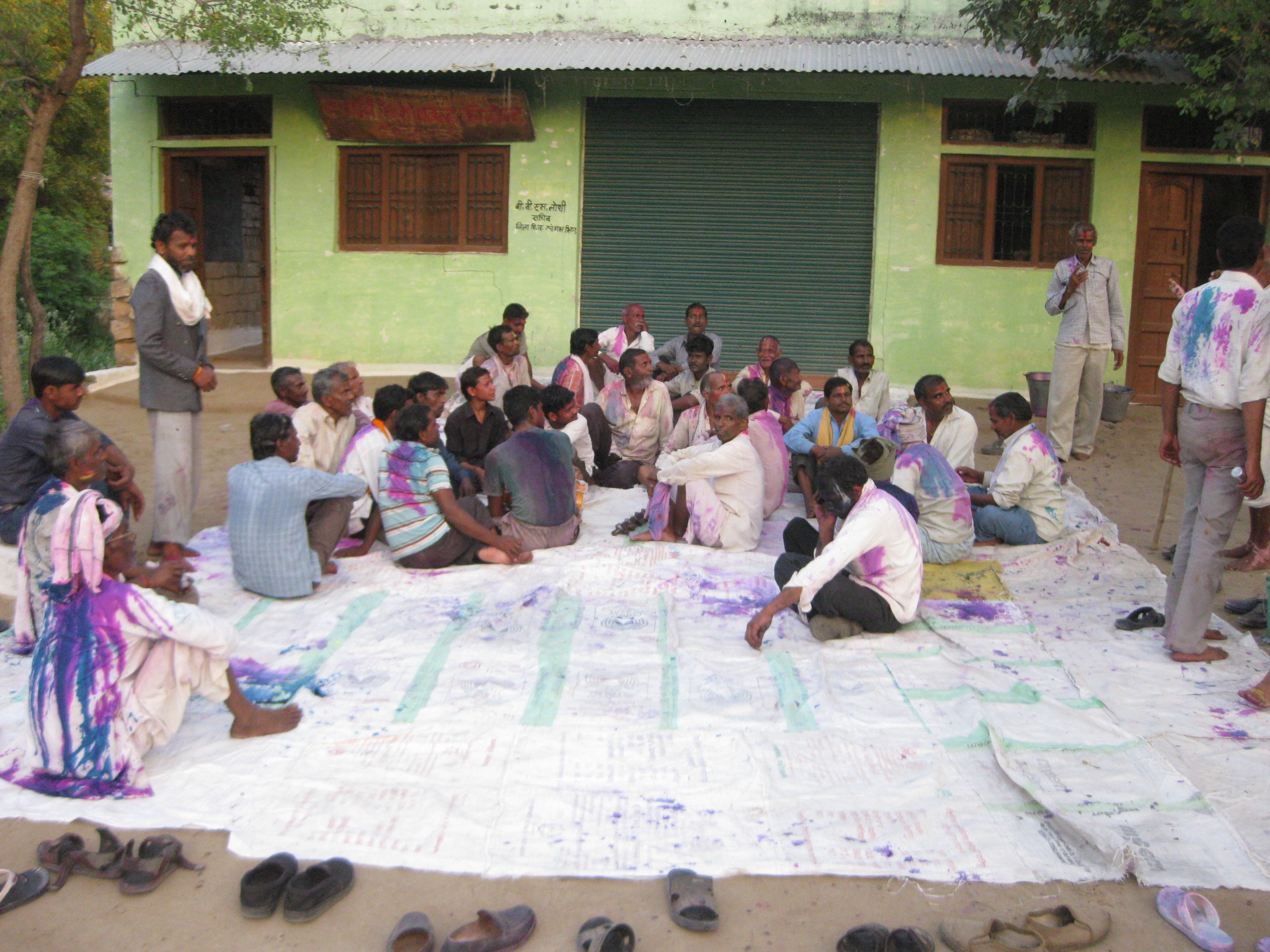
Holi festival celebration

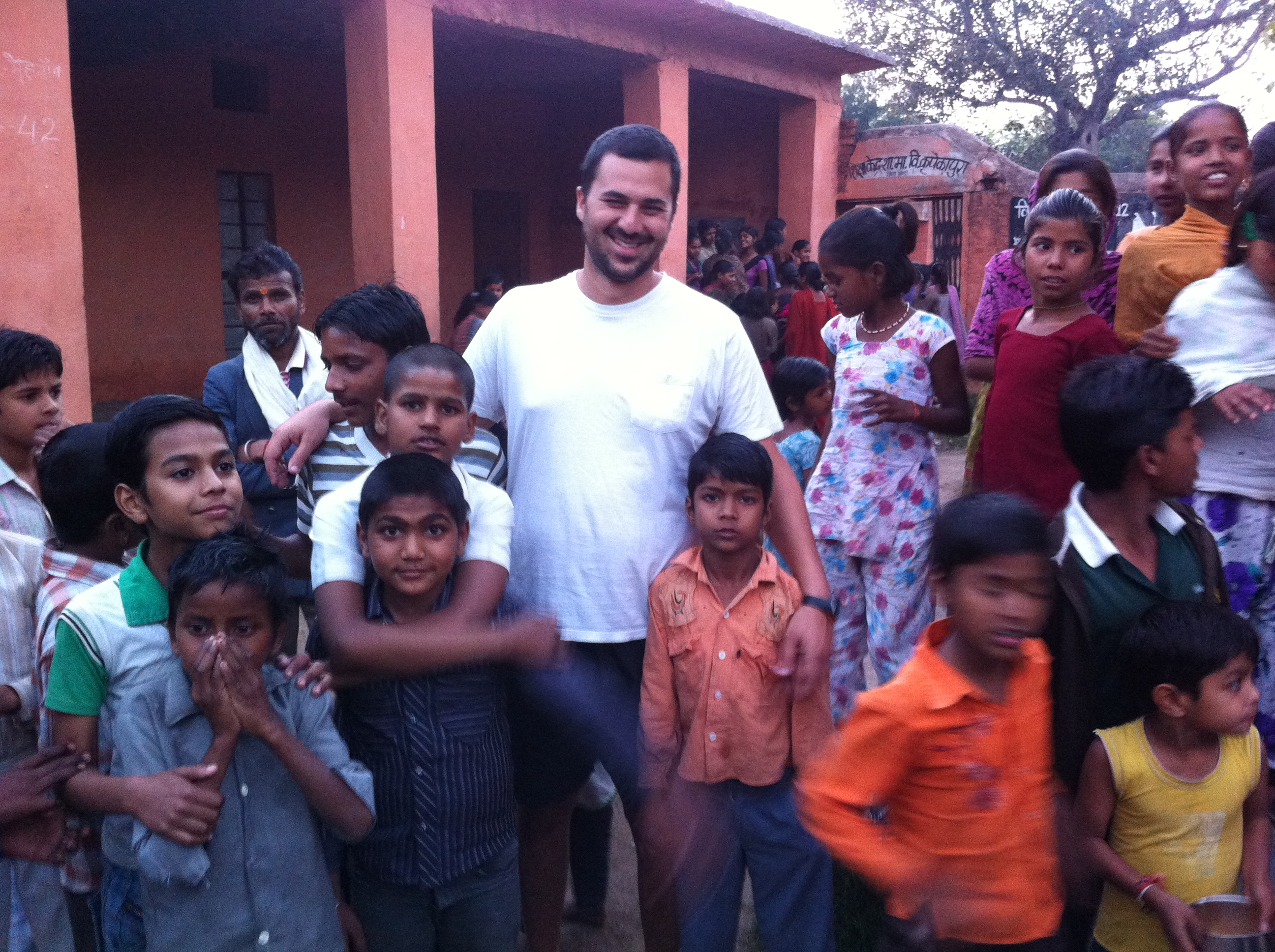
Australian tourists visiting Kripekapura

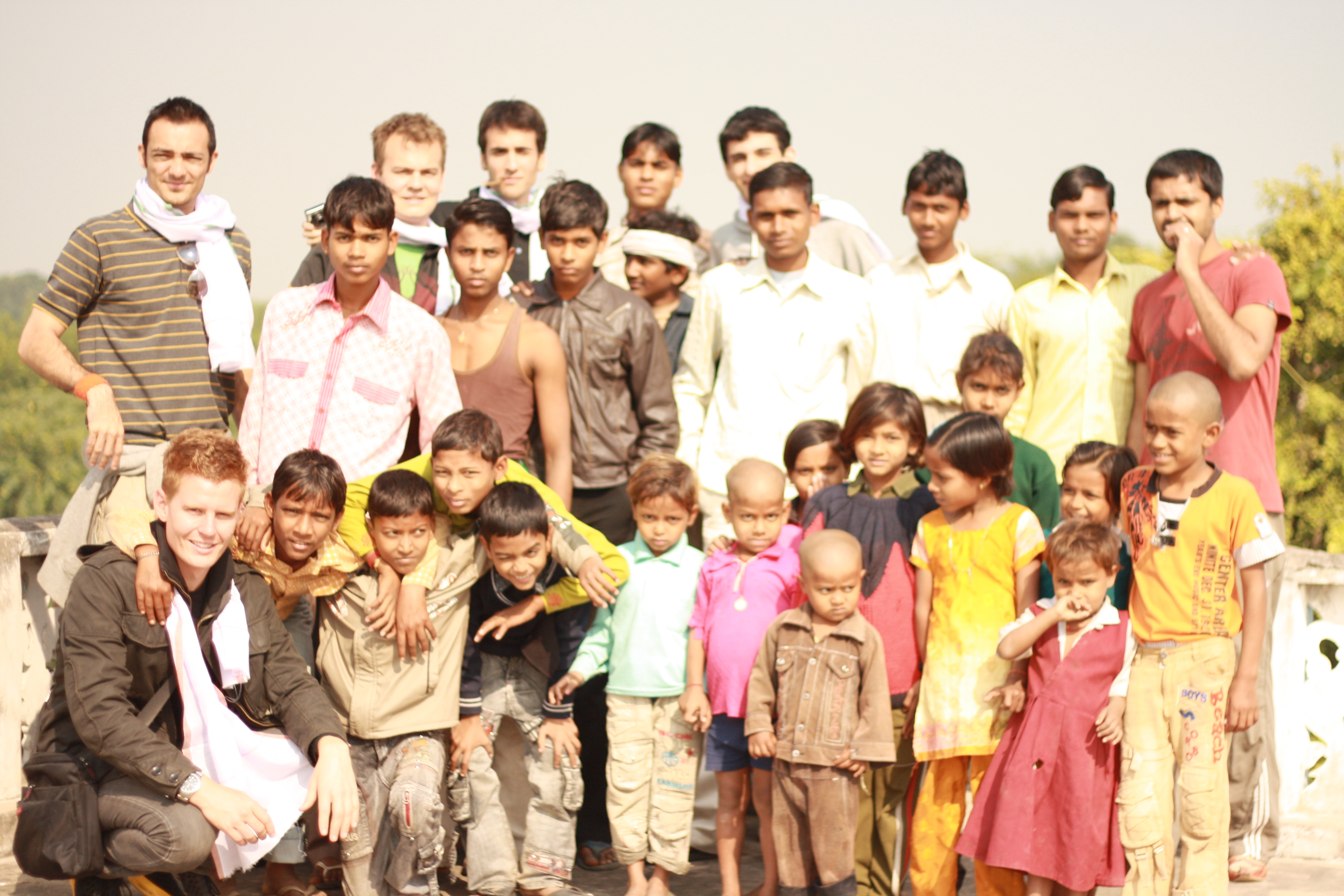
Australian tourists visiting Kripekapura, yashpal lodhi's marriage

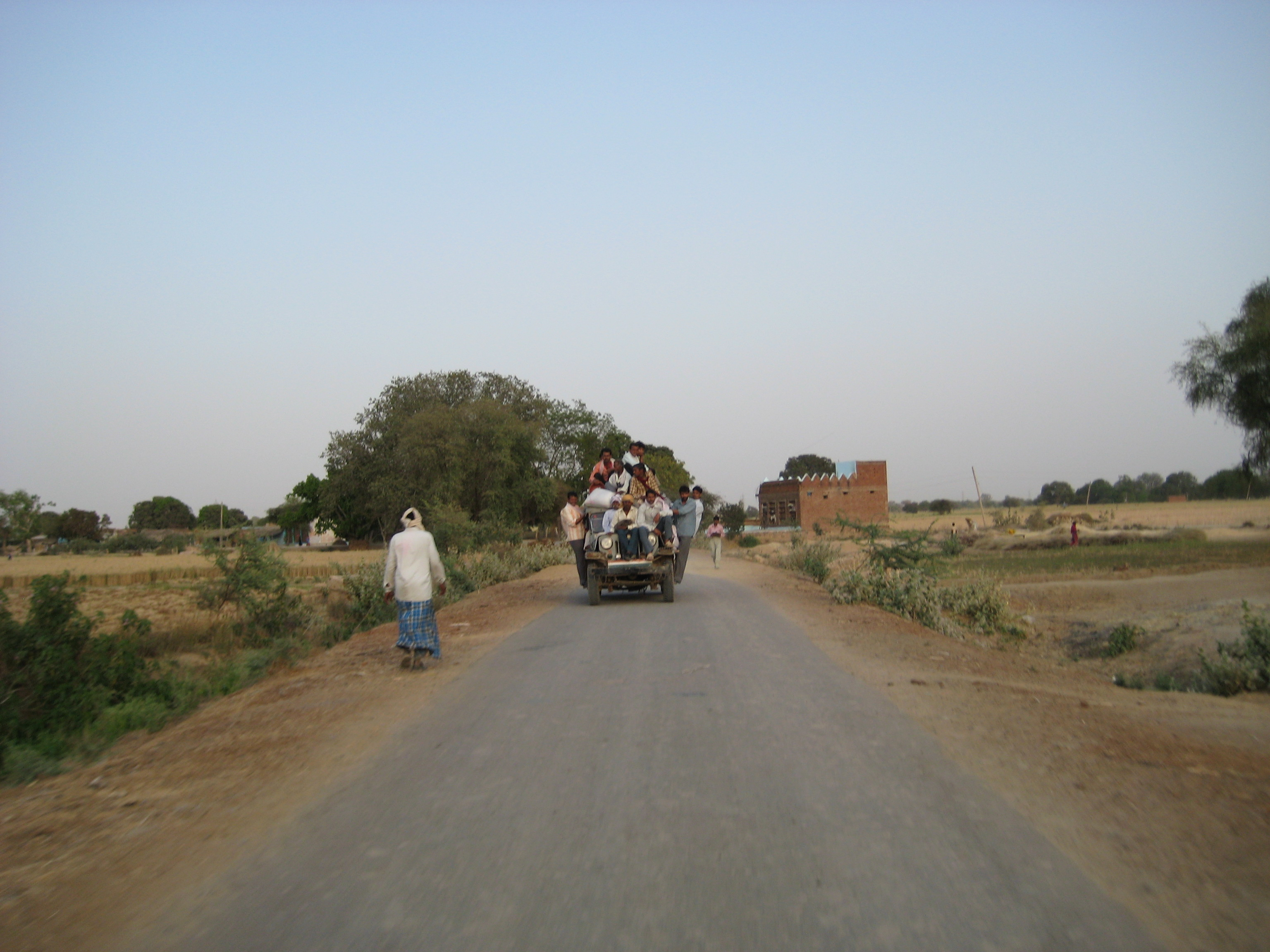
Kripekapura transport

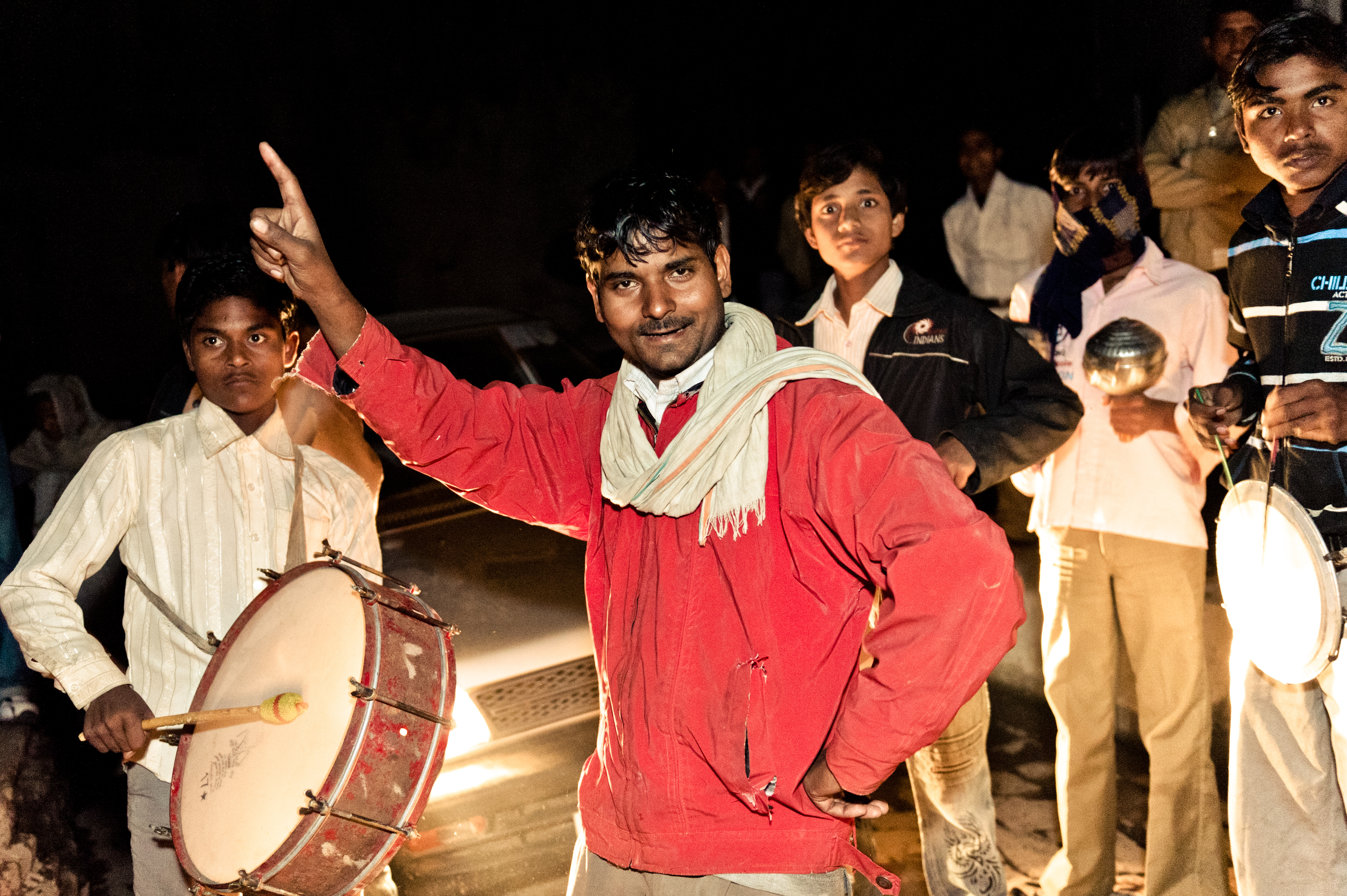
Kripekapura band baaja

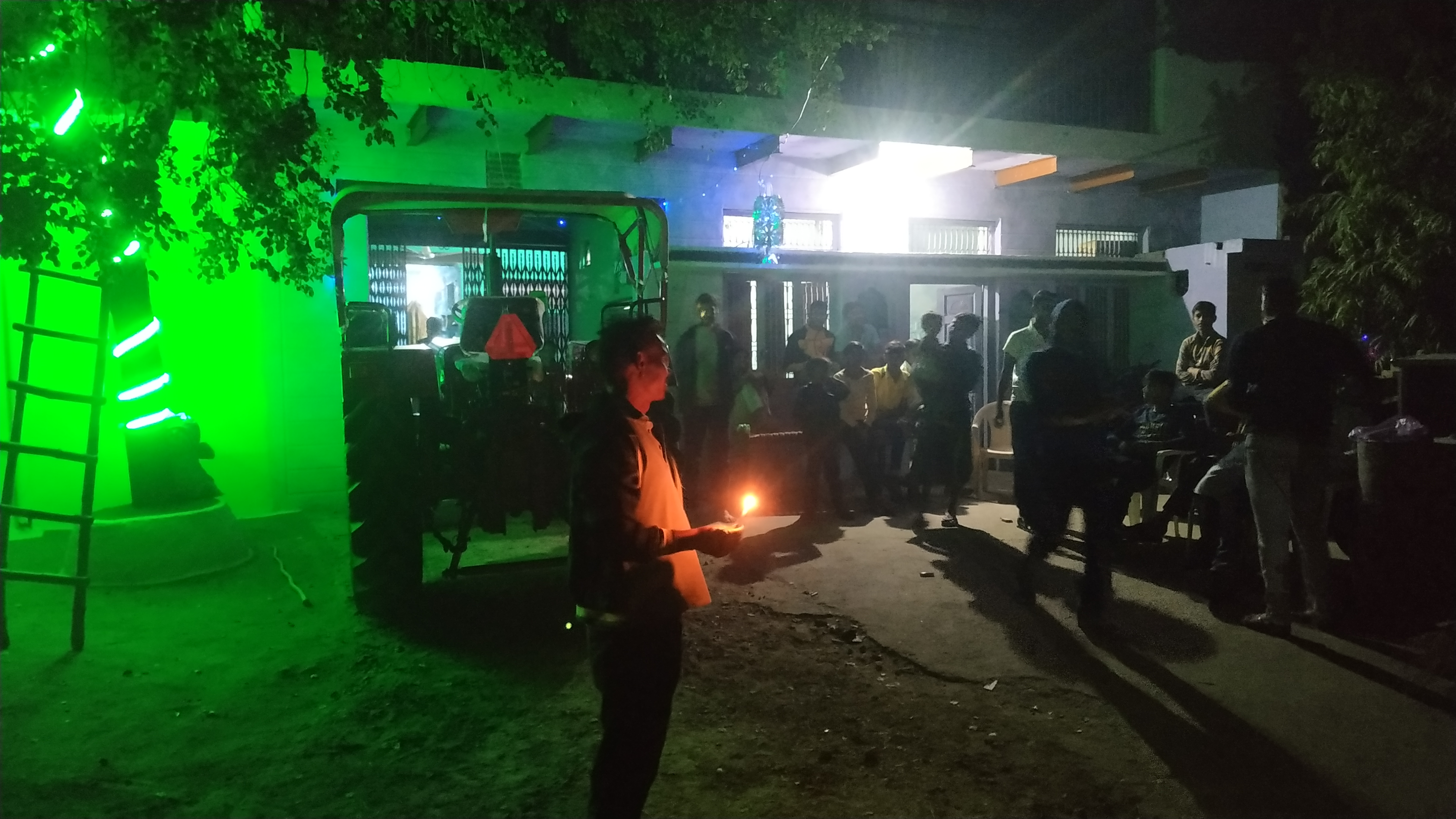
Diwali festival time

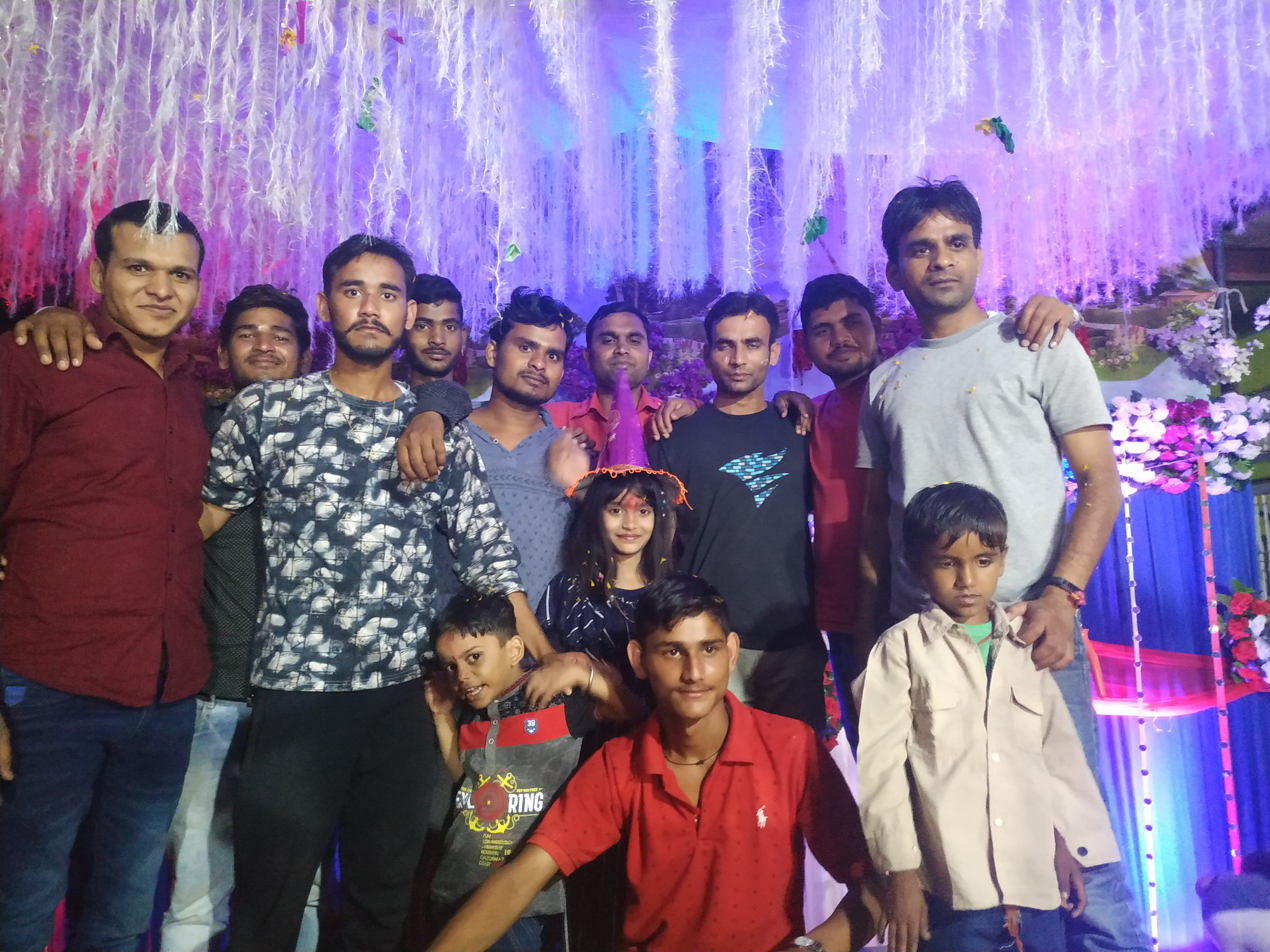
Narwaria brothers birthday party

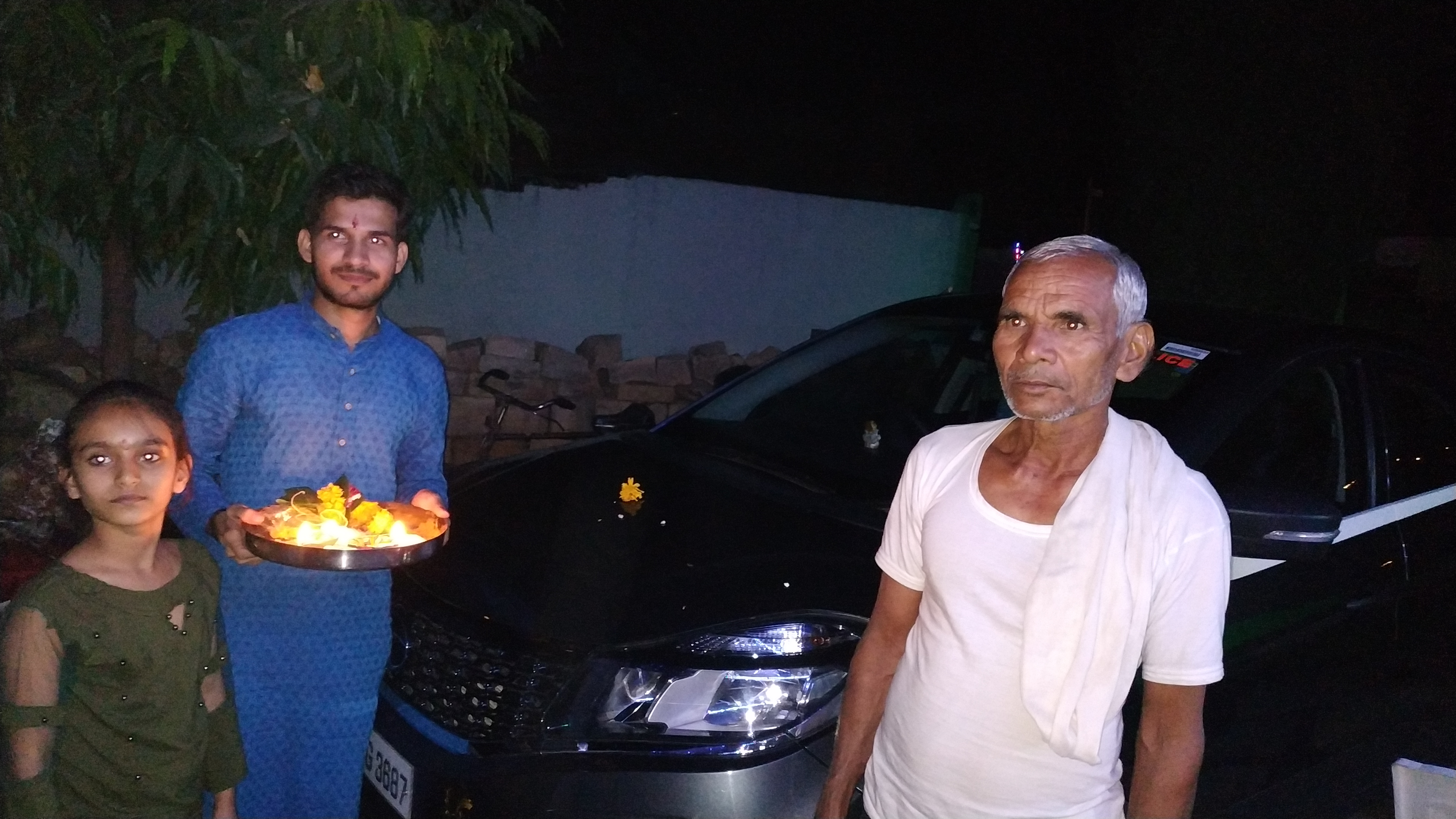
diwali time narwaria brothers

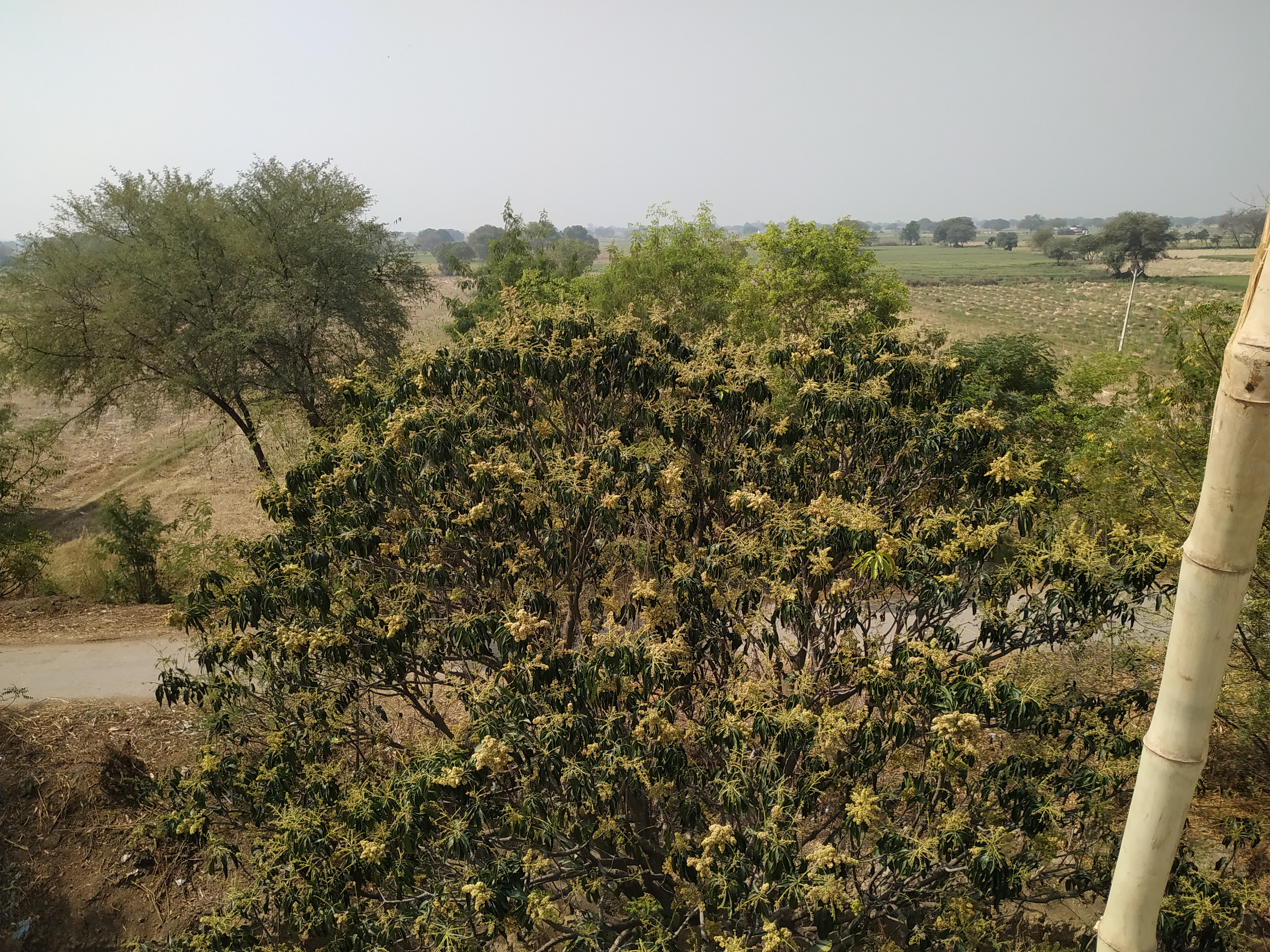
kripekapura mango tree narwaria brothers farm house

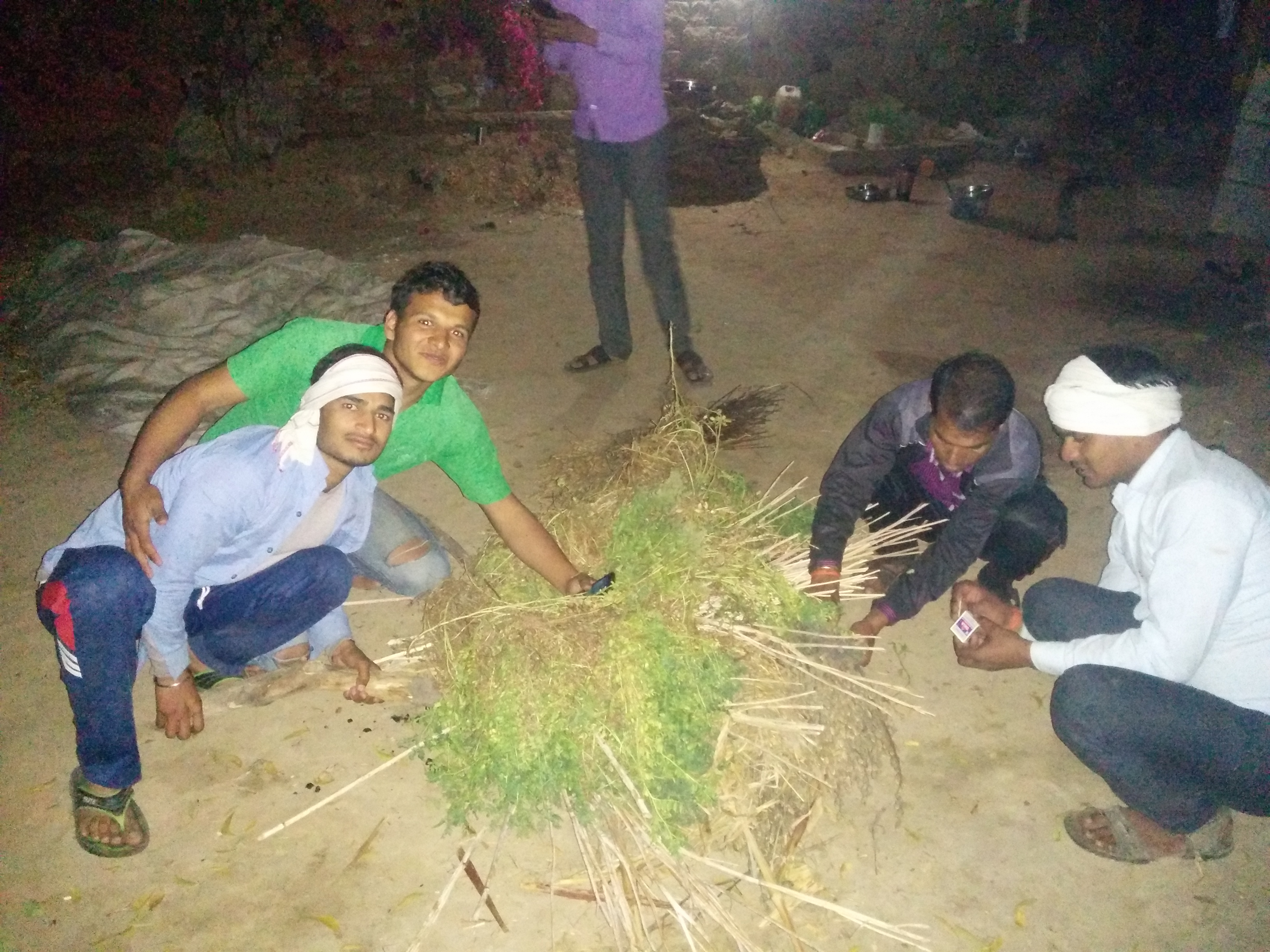
Kripekapura farm black gram

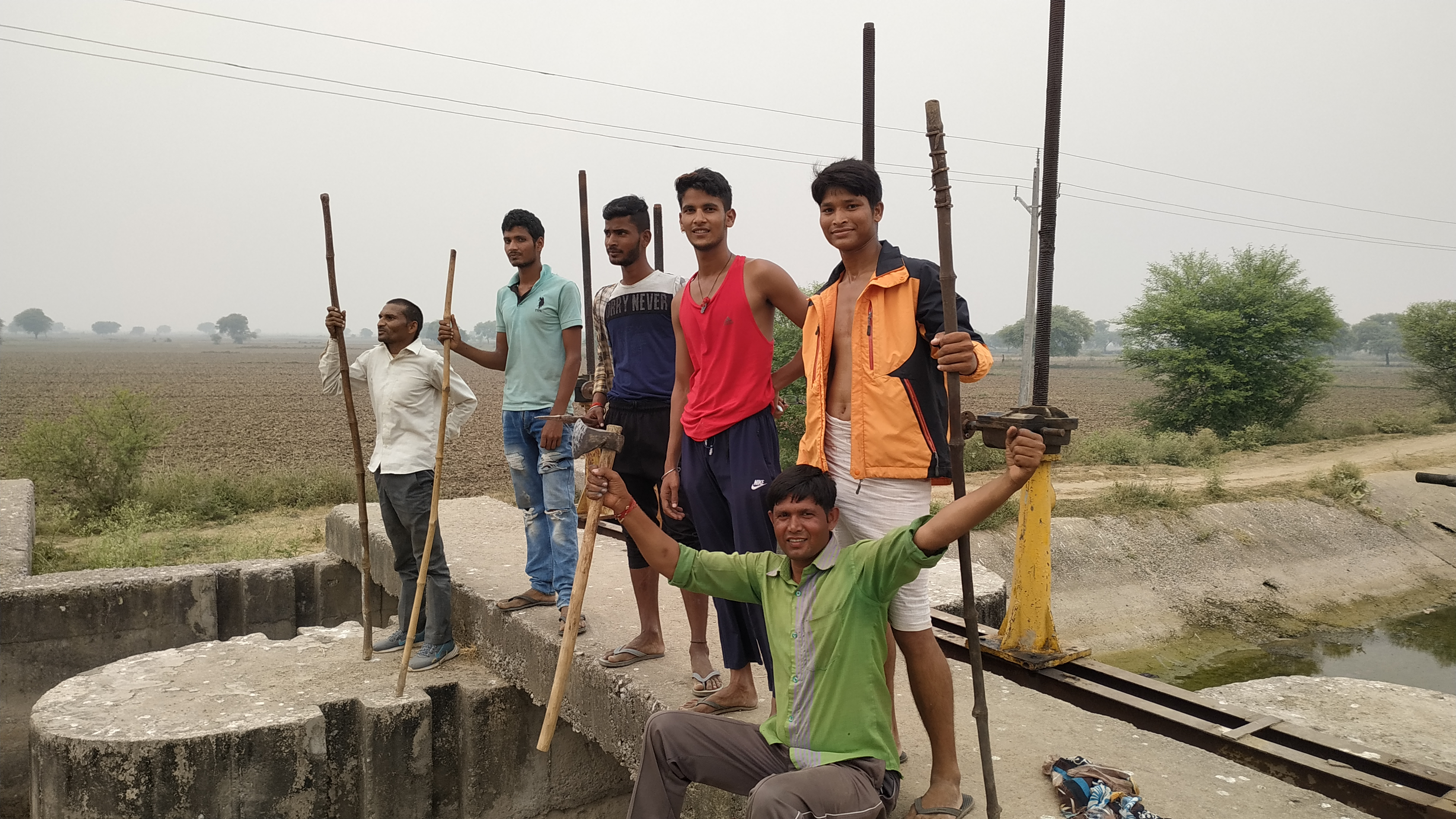
kripekapura lattha sports
