= Daboh =

- Town
- Location in Madhya Pradesh, India Daboh (India)
- Coordinates: 26.03°N 78.88°E
- Country: India
- State: Madhya Pradesh
- District: Bhind
- Elevation: 161 m (528 ft)

Population (2016)
  - Total: 58,536

Languages
  - Official: Hindi
- Time zone: UTC+5:30 (IST)
- ISO 3166 code: IN-MP
- Vehicle registration: MP

Daboh is a town and a nagar panchayat in Bhind district in the state of Madhya Pradesh, India.

== Geography ==
Daboh is located at 26.03°N 78.88°E. It has an average elevation of 161 metres (528 feet).

== Demographics ==
As of 2001 Indian census, Daboh had a population of 15,897. Males constitute 54% of the population and females 46%. Daboh has an average literacy rate of 60%, higher than the national average of 59.5%: male literacy is 72% and female literacy is 47%. In Daboh, 17% of the population is under 6 years of age.
