= Come, Gentle Night! =

Poem by Clifton Bingham

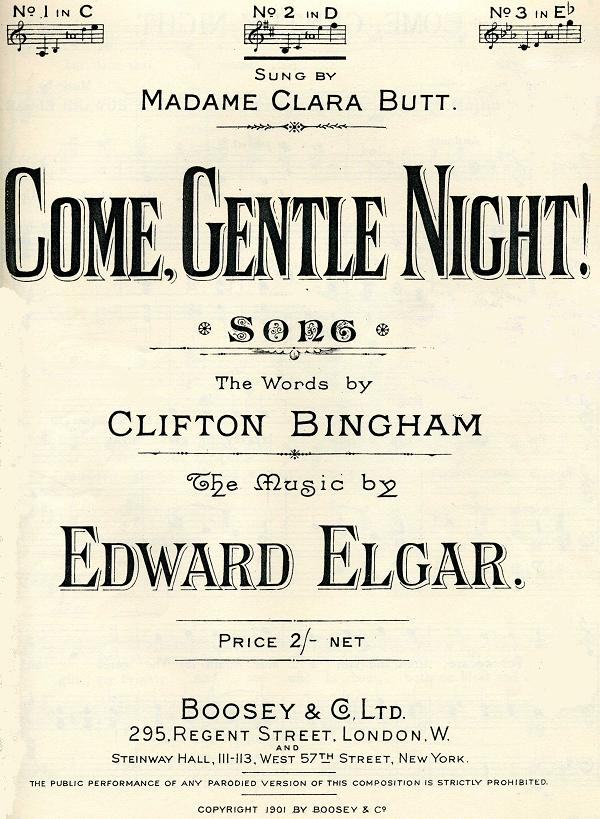

"Come, Gentle Night!" is a poem by Clifton Bingham set to music by the English composer Edward Elgar in 1901.

It is a song for soprano voice, the title page advertising that it was sung by Madame Clara Butt.

The song was written at the same time as Elgar's Cockaigne, and published in 1901 by Boosey & Co. in London and New York. It was first performed in Queens Hall, London on 12 October 1901, sung by Clara Butt.

In his book on Elgar, Thomas Dunhill criticised this and others of his songs, finding it "...almost unbelievable that a composer of such power and distinction should have been willing to attach his name to productions like After, The Pipes of Pan, Come, Gentle Night! and Pleading". Dunhill considered some "...scarcely distinguishable from pot-boilers turned out by baser English composers in the days of ballad concerts."

== Lyrics ==
Come, gentle night!

Upon our eye-lids lay thy fingers light;
For we are tired, and fain aside would lay
The cares and burdens that surround the day.

Come, peaceful night!

Thy courier-stars already glitter bright;
And we who labour, both unblest and blest,
Are weary of our work, and long for rest.

Come, holy night!

Long is the day and ceaseless is the fight;
Around us bid thy quiet shadows creep,
And rock us in thy sombre arms to sleep!

== Recordings ==
- Songs and Piano Music by Edward Elgar has "Come, gentle night!" performed by Amanda Pitt (soprano), with David Owen Norris (piano).
- Elgar: Complete Songs for Voice & Piano performed by Konrad Jarnot (baritone), with Reinild Mees (piano)
