= Chandokh =

Village in Bhind District

- Rural
- Nickname: Chandoukh
- Location in Madhya Pradesh, India Chandokh (India)
- Coordinates: 26.2728831°N 78.9860275°E
- Country: India
- State: Madhya Pradesh
- District: Bhind
- Block: Roun
- Tehsil: Mihona

Languages
  - Official: Hindi
- Time zone: UTC+5:30 (IST)
- PIN: 477441
- Telephone code: 07534
- Vehicle registration: MP-30

Chandokh is Gram Panchayat village in Mihona tehsil of Bhind district in the Indian state of Madhya Pradesh. It contains Chaklen, Chandokh and Kunwarpura No.1 villages.

== Geography ==
Chandokh is located at 26.2728831°N 78.9860275°E.
