= Jaitpura Gudha =

Village in Bhind District

- Village
- Location in Madhya Pradesh, India Jaitpura Gudha (India)
- Coordinates: 26.2852874°N 79.0032453°E
- Country: India
- State: Madhya Pradesh
- District: Bhind
- Elevation: 28 m (92 ft)

Languages, English
  - Official: Hindi
- Time zone: UTC+5:30 (IST)
- PIN Code: 477441
- Telephone code: 07534
- ISO 3166 code: IN-MP
- Vehicle registration: MP-30
- Website: Bhind.nic.in

Jaitpura Gudha is a village in Bhind District and it comes under jaitpura lidhaura padhohan ka pura Gram Panchayat which comes under Mihona Tehsil and it comes under Lahar Vidhan Sabha which is an assembly constituency in Bhind district in the Indian state of Madhya Pradesh. As of 2011 India census, Jaitpura Gudha has a population of over 1778.
