= Mehgaon =

- Town
- Nickname: mehgaon
- Location in Madhya Pradesh, India Mehgaon (India)
- Coordinates: 26°29′47″N 78°36′49″E
- Country: India
- State: Madhya Pradesh
- District: Bhind

Population (2011)
  - Total: 21,335

Languages
  - Official: Hindi
- Time zone: UTC+5:30 (IST)
- Pincode: 477557

Mehgaon is a City and a Nagar Parishad in Bhind district in the Indian state of Madhya Pradesh.

Ramdhan Singh Narwaria was the First MLA of Mehgaon. He served for three terms (1947-1952, 1952-1957, and 1962-1967).

Mehgaon is divided into 15 wards for which elections are held every 5 years. The Mehgaon Nagar Parishad has population of 21,335 of which 11,462 are males while 9,873 are females as per report released by Census India 2011.

Ramjilal (Rama) Gondiya, is a Social Activist and Local politician and Former Councillor of Mehgaon Nagar Parishad .He is very vocal about the problems in the region and actively resolved them with efficiency.

His wife Mrs.Sunita Devi has been a Councillor in Mehgaon NP and his mother Mrs. Javitri Devi was the Sarpanch of Manhad Village near Mehgaon.

== Demographics ==
o build roads within Nagar Panchayat limits and impose taxes on properties coming under its jurisdiction. Ch.Mukesh Singh Chaturvedi is a popular social activist who happens to be an ex-MLA too. He is very vocal about the problems in the region and actively resolved them with efficiency. Street Light, Roads & Development conditions are Very Poor in Mehgaon & Needs Rapid attention of authorities towards developmentof City. Mehgaon Religion Data 2011

cm rise school boys school

== Population ==
Total-21,335

Hindu - 81.32%

Muslim -13.67%

Christian - 0.06%

Sikh - 0.07%

Buddhist - 0.09%

Jain - 76%

Others - 0.04%

Not Stated-0.09%
