= Even in the Tremor =

Studio album by Lady Lamb
- Released: April 5, 2019
- Studio: Figure 8 Studios (New York City)
- Genre: Rock
- Length: 47:04
- Label: Ba Da Bing
- Producer: Aly Spaltro, Erin Tonkon

Lady Lamb chronology
After (2015)	Even in the Tremor (2019)

Professional ratings
Aggregate scores
Source	Rating
Metacritic	77/100
Review scores
Source	Rating
American Songwriter	4/5
Consequence of Sound	B+
Pitchfork	7.1/10
PopMatters	7/10

Even in the Tremor is the third studio album by American musician Lady Lamb. It was released in April 2019 on Ba Da Bing Records.

== Track listing ==
All tracks are written by Aly Spaltro, except track 11 co-written with Benjamin Lazar Davis

No.	Title	Length
1.	"Little Flaws"	4:15
2.	"Deep Love"	3:58
3.	"Even in the Tremor"	4:25
4.	"Untitled Soul"	4:37
5.	"Strange Maneuvers"	3:37
6.	"Without a Name"	3:51
7.	"Young Disciple"	3:28
8.	"Prayer of Love"	3:49
9.	"July Was Mundane"	6:54
10.	"Oh My Violence"	4:34
11.	"Emily"	3:36
Total length:		47:04

== Personnel ==
Main musicians

- Aly Spaltro – vocals, guitar, synth, percussion

Production'

- Jake Aron – mixing
- Joe LaPorta – mastering
- Aly Spaltro – producer
- Erin Tonkon – engineer, producer
- Lily Wen – assistant engineer

Additional musicians

- Benjamin Lazar Davis – bass, piano, synth, mellotron
- Jeremy Gustin – drums, percussion
- Ben Lester – pedal steel guitar
- Emily Hope Price – cello
- Emily Jane Price – violin

Artwork

- Aly Spaltro – art direction, graphic layout
- Erica Peplin – art direction
- Shervin Lainez – photography
- G.E. Ulrich – photography ("Volcano" image)
