= Machhand =

- Village
- Location in Madhya Pradesh, India Machhand (India)
- Coordinates: 26.3112°N 79.0476°E
- Country: India
- State: Madhya Pradesh
- District: Bhind
- Elevation: 28 m (92 ft)

Population (2011)
  - Total: 10,003

Languages, English
  - Official: Hindi
- Time zone: UTC+5:30 (IST)
- PIN Code: 477441
- Telephone code: 07534
- ISO 3166 code: IN-MP
- Vehicle registration: MP-30
- Website: Bhind.nic.in

Machhand is a village panchayat situated in Bhind district of the Indian State of Madhya Pradesh in central India.
