= After (Lady Lamb album) =

Studio album by Lady Lamb
- Released: March 3, 2015
- Genre: Rock
- Length: 55:57
- Label: Mom + Pop Music
- Producer: Nadim Issa, Aly Spaltro

Lady Lamb chronology
Ripely Pine (2013)	After (2015)	Even in the Tremor (2019)

Professional ratings
Aggregate scores
Source	Rating
Metacritic	81/100
Review scores
Source	Rating
AllMusic	4/5 stars
Pitchfork	7.4/10

After is the second studio album by American musician Lady Lamb. It was released in March 2015 under Mom + Pop Music.

== Track listing ==
All tracks are written by Aly Spaltro, except tracks 3 and 7 co-written with TJ Metcalfe

No.	Title	Length
1.	"Vena Cava"	3:54
2.	"Billions of Eyes"	5:12
3.	"Violet Clementine"	4:46
4.	"Heretic"	4:15
5.	"Sunday Shoes"	5:20
6.	"Spat Out Spit"	4:30
7.	"Penny Licks"	5:12
8.	"Dear Arkansas Daughter"	5:54
9.	"Milk Duds"	3:11
10.	"Ten"	4:47
11.	"Batter"	2:52
12.	"Atlas"	6:04
Total length:		55:57

== Personnel ==
Main musicians

- Aly Spaltro – vocals, guitar, bass, banjo, organ, omnichord, synth, keys, percussion
- Marco Buccelli – drums, percussion

Production

- Nadim Issa – engineer, mixing, producer
- Aly Spaltro – producer, artwork, layout
- Joe LaPorta – mastering
- Shervin Lainez – photography
- David Shetterly – typography

Additional musicians

- Jacob Augustine – backing vocals (track 3)
- Gabriel Birnbaum – bari sax (tracks 3, 6)
- Dup Crosson – backing vocals (track 3)
- Nick Grinder – trombone (tracks 3, 6, 10, 12)
- Emily Holden – violin (tracks 6, 12)
- Nadim Issa – organ (tracks 2, 3, 9), vibraphone (tracks 3, 6), piano (track 6), synth (track 7), tenori (track 7), backing vocals (track 7)
- Cole Kamen-Green – trumpet (tracks 3, 6, 10, 12)
- TJ Metcalfe – backing vocals (track 3)
- Emily Hope Price – cello (tracks 6, 8, 12), backing vocals (track 7)
- Andrew Schuyler – handclap (track 9)
- Elizabeth Taillon – backing vocals (track 3)
