= Lady Lamb =

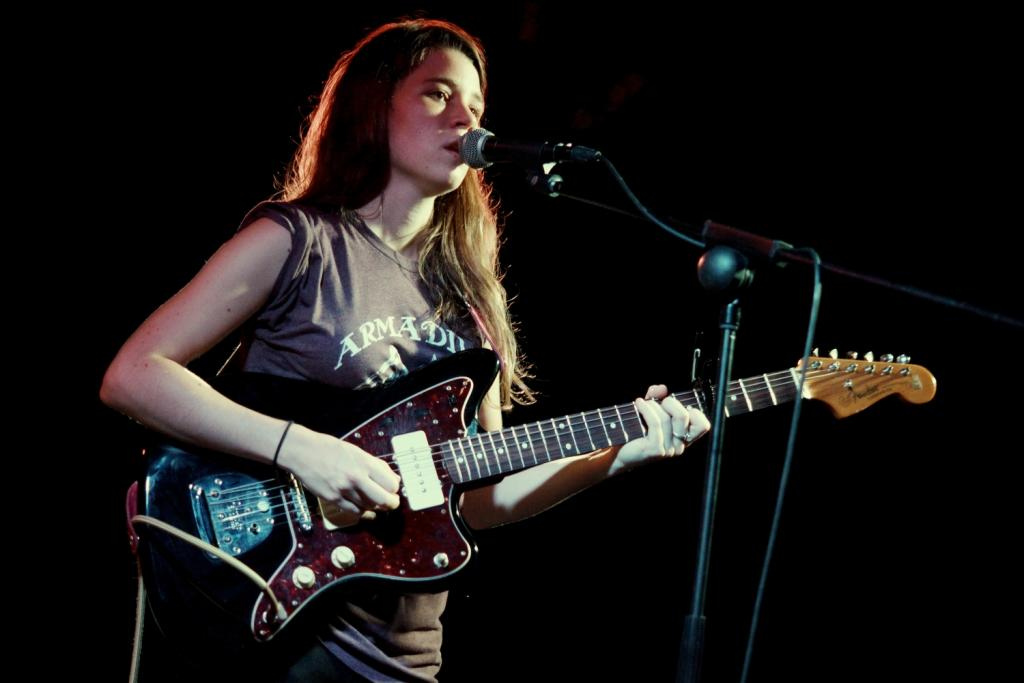
- Lady Lamb in 2013.

Background information
- Born: July 6, 1989 (age 37)
- Origin: Brunswick, Maine, United States
- Genres: Indie rock, indie folk
- Instruments: Vocals, guitar, banjo
- Years active: 2007–present
- Labels: Ba Da Bing (2013-2015, 2019-Present); Mom + Pop (2015-2019)
- Website: www.ladylambjams.com

Aly Spaltro, better known by her stage name Lady Lamb (formerly called Lady Lamb the Beekeeper) is an American singer-songwriter. Spaltro first began writing music in 2007 while working at Bart & Greg's DVD Explosion, the local video rental store in her hometown of Brunswick, Maine. Spaltro worked the closing shift, and would experiment with and record music all night into the morning. The first Lady Lamb recordings were home recordings distributed in handmade packages to the local Bullmoose Record Store in Brunswick.

In 2010, Spaltro moved to Brooklyn, New York. In 2012, Spaltro met producer Nadim Issa and recorded her debut studio record, Ripely Pine at Let Em In Music in Gowanus, Brooklyn. It was released February 19, 2013 on Brooklyn's Ba Da Bing Records.

In 2014, Spaltro recorded and co-produced her sophomore studio album, After, with Nadim Issa at Let Em In Music. Late that same year, Spaltro signed with Mom + Pop Music and released the album After on March 3, 2015. In December 2016 she released the seven track self-produced EP "Tender Warriors Club" recorded at Kristian Matsson's home studio in Sweden.

In 2019, Spaltro released Even in the Tremor, her third studio album, co-produced with New York-based producer Erin Tonkon. It was released on Ba Da Bing Records.

In 2023, Spaltro released her self-produced box-set "In The Mammoth Nothing of The Night" on Ba Da Bing Records, commemorating ten years of her first studio record, "Ripely Pine."

In November 2026, Spaltro announced a book of fan writings titled That We May Ripely Pine and the live album Lady Lamb Live at the State Theatre, both due in December.

== Discography ==
Studio albums

Year	Title	Label	Format
2007	The Tingly Circus	Self-Release	Digital
2008	Someday We Will Levitate	Self-Release	Digital
2008	Samples for Handsome Animals	Self-Release	Digital
2010	Mammoth Swoon	Self-Release	Digital
2012	head is swimming (2012 bedroom recordings)	Self-Release	Digital
2013	Ripely Pine	Ba Da Bing Records (US), BB*Island (Europe)	CD, LP, Digital
2015	After	Mom + Pop (US), BB*Island (Europe)	CD, LP, Digital
2019	Even in the Tremor	Ba Da Bing Records (US), BB*Island (Europe)	CD, LP, Digital
2023	In The Mammoth Nothing Of The Night	Ba Da Bing Records (US)	CD, 5xLP, Digital

EPs

Year	Title	Label	Format
2009	The World Tour EP	Self-Release	
2016	Tender Warriors Club EP	Mom + Pop	LP, Digital

Singles

Year	Title	Album
2011	"All I Really Want to Do"	non-album singles
2016	"See You"	Tender Warriors Club
2019	"Even in the Tremor	Even In the Tremor
2019	"Deep Love"	Even In the Tremor
2020	"We've Got A Good Thing Going"	non-album singles
2020	"Arizona"	non-album singles
2022	"Ivy"	non-album singles
2022	"Wolves of My Want"	non-album singles
2023	"Between Two Trees"	non-album singles
