= Mau, Bhind =

Mau
- City
- Location in Madhya Pradesh, India Mau (India)
- Coordinates: 26.266°N 78.666°E
- Country: India
- State: Madhya Pradesh
- District: Bhind
- Elevation: 434 m (1,424 ft)

Population (2011)
  - Total: 25,625

Languages
  - Official: Hindi
- Time zone: UTC+5:30 (IST)
- Postal code: 477222
- ISO 3166 code: IN-MP
- Vehicle registration: MP 30

Mau is a city and Tehsil in the Bhind district of the Indian state of Madhya Pradesh. The soil of Mau is very fertile and is drained by the Jhilmil river. Formerly, Mau was part of the Raun constituency. Today, Mau is a part of the Gohad constituency. Mau is a municipality, the municipality president is Mr. Sajjan Singh Yadav (BJP).

Mevaram Jatav (Congress) is MLA Mau-Gohad Constituency. Mau is part of the Chambal Division. Mrs. Sandhya Rai (BJP) is an MP from Bhind. The Mau Municipality is divided into 15 wards but now present are 17 Wards. Ward 15 Salampura (Mau), Ward 16 Kheria Jallu (Mau), Ward 17 Kitehna (Mau).

== Demographics ==
The population of the city is about 35,000. Mau has an average literacy rate of 72%, lower than the national average of 74.04%. Male literacy is 67%, and female literacy is 39%. The majority of residents in the Mau region are Yadavs. In Mau, 16% of the population is under 6 years of age.

== Rivers ==
Jhilmil is the only river in Mau. It is a relatively small river in comparison to other rivers in the area. However, the height of the river increases considerably during the rainy season.

== Roads ==
NH-719 is currently the only National Highway in the city, which is around 45 km away from Mau. Major District Road MDR 13 stems from Mau, as well as other major roads.

== Airport ==
Gwalior Airport (IATA: GWL, ICAO: VIGR) is the nearest and only airport. It is around 75 kilometres (47 mi) away.

== Healthcare ==
There is one government community health center(CHC) currently Dr Vikas Kaurav is in charge B.M.O. there. There are and many private hospitals and clinics.

== Education ==
KS College and Ch Kamal Singh College are the two main colleges in Mau.

== Soil and agriculture ==
Mostly alluvial soil.
