= Ater tehsil =

Ater is a tehsil in the Bhind district in the Indian state of Madhya Pradesh.

The villages of Ater are as follows:

Number	District	Tehsil	Village
1	Bhind	Ater	Ahrauli Ghat
2	Bhind	Ater	Ahrauli Kali
3	Bhind	Ater	Aakaun
4	Bhind	Ater	Amleda
5	Bhind	Ater	Ater
6	Bhind	Ater	Badapura
7	Bhind	Ater	Badapura
8	Bhind	Ater	Bagulari
9	Bhind	Ater	Balarpura
10	Bhind	Ater	Barauli
11	Bhind	Ater	Bhujpura
12	Bhind	Ater	Bichauli
13	Bhind	Ater	Bijaura
14	Bhind	Ater	Chilonga
15	Bhind	Ater	Chowmhon
16	Bhind	Ater	Chowki
17	Bhind	Ater	Daipura
18	Bhind	Ater	Dehra
19	Bhind	Ater	Dharai
20	Bhind	Ater	Dulhagan
21	Bhind	Ater	Ainthar
22	Bhind	Ater	Garha
23	Bhind	Ater	Gajna
24	Bhind	Ater	Ghinonchi
25	Bhind	Ater	Gauarkalan
26	Bhind	Ater	Gauarkhurd
27	Bhind	Ater	Gauhadupura
28	Bhind	Ater	Gopalpura
29	Bhind	Ater	Continue
30	Bhind	Ater	Jamhaura
31	Bhind	Ater	Jamsara
32	Bhind	Ater	Janaura
33	Bhind	Ater	Jawasa
34	Bhind	Ater	Jori Brahmin
35	Bhind	Ater	Jori Kotwal
36	Bhind	Ater	Kachpura
37	Bhind	Ater	Kadaura
38	Bhind	Ater	Kamai
39	Bhind	Ater	Kanaira
40	Bhind	Ater	Kharairi
41	Bhind	Ater	Khadit
42	Bhind	Ater	Khipona
43	Bhind	Ater	Kisupura
44	Bhind	Ater	Koshan
45	Bhind	Ater	Kyapuripura
46	Bhind	Ater	Lavan
47	Bhind	Ater	Madhiyapura
48	Bhind	Ater	Maghaira
49	Bhind	Ater	Mahapur
50	Bhind	Ater	Manepura
51	Bhind	Ater	Mussoorie
52	Bhind	Ater	Matghana
53	Bhind	Ater	Moghna
54	Bhind	Ater	Mrigpura
55	Bhind	Ater	Mudhiyapura
56	Bhind	Ater	Muratpura
57	Bhind	Ater	Nakhlouli
58	Bhind	Ater	Naripura
59	Bhind	Ater	Narsingh Garh
60	Bhind	Ater	Navali Brandavan
61	Bhind	Ater	Naib
62	Bhind	Ater	Niwari
63	Bhind	Ater	Pali
64	Bhind	Ater	Para
65	Bhind	Ater	Pariyaya
66	Bhind	Ater	Pawai
67	Bhind	Ater	Pidhaura
68	Bhind	Ater	Pipri
69	Bhind	Ater	Pithanpura
70	Bhind	Ater	Pratapura
71	Bhind	Ater	Pur
72	Bhind	Ater	Rama
73	Bhind	Ater	Raipura
74	Bhind	Ater	Ridauli
75	Bhind	Ater	Sakraya
76	Bhind	Ater	Shuklapura
77	Bhind	Ater	Simrao
78	Bhind	Ater	Soura
79	Bhind	Ater	Soi
80	Bhind	Ater	Surpura
81	Bhind	Ater	Syawali
82	Bhind	Ater	Tarsokhar
83	Bhind	Ater	Udotgarh
84	Bhind	Ater	Udotpura
85	Bhind	Ater	Vindwa
86	Bhind	Ater	Viragwarani
87	Bhind	Ater	Viragwan
