= Attaché Temporaire d'Enseignement et de Recherche =

In France, an ATER, Attaché Temporaire d'Enseignement et de Recherche (EN: Non-Tenured Teaching and Research Fellow), is a teaching and research fellow hired on a limited-time and limited-renewal contract type in French higher education, requiring, among others, the engagement to compete for a civil servant position (with no specification of date).
