= Gormi =

- Location in Madhya Pradesh, India Gormi (India)
- Coordinates: 26.599502°N 78.510186°E
- Country: India
- State: Madhya Pradesh
- District: Bhind
- Elevation: 147 m (482 ft)

Population (2001)
  - Total: 17,255

Languages
  - Official: Hindi
- Time zone: UTC+5:30 (IST)
- Postal code: 477660
- Vehicle registration: MP-30

Gormi is a block and a nagar panchayat in Bhind district in the Indian state of Madhya Pradesh. Gormi is located at 26.6°N 78.52°E. .

== Demographics ==
As of 2001 India census, Gormi had a population of 17,255. Males constitute 54% of the population and females 46%. Gormi has an average literacy rate of 62%, higher than the national average of 59.5%: male literacy is 72%, and female literacy is 50%. In Gormi, 17% of the population is under 6 years of age. There is a temple of Lord Hanuman near Dixit Market. Gormi is known as the worship place of Gautam rishi.

== Temples ==
- Mahadev mandir at Seupura
- Dhurkot the Hanuman temple
- Rangeshwar Mahadev Mandir
- Mahadev Mandir In Purani Basti
- Jain Mandir
- Ancient temple of Gautam Rishi
- Khedapati Hanuman Mandir Mehdoli
- Chinta Haran Hanuman Mandir
- Hanuman mandir kot

== Education ==
- Shri Ramnath Singh Mahavidyalaya Pharmacy, Gormi is affiliated to Rajiv Gandhi Proudyogiki Vishwavidyalaya (RGPV), Bhopal
- Shri Ramnath Singh Homeopathic Medical College and Hospital, Gormi
- Shri Gokul Singh parmar Shiksha Prasar samiti gormi
- Sanskar Shiksha Academy CBSE
- Sanskar ITI College
- Sanskar institute of vedic science
- Saraswati Shishu Vidya Mandir
- Government Higher Secondary School
- Guljhari lal high school
- patel collage gormi
- Kalyani Convent school Gormi
