= Roun =

Raun
- Town
- Location in Madhya Pradesh Raun (India)
- Coordinates: 26.34°N 78.93°E
- Country: India
- State: Madhya Pradesh
- District: Bhind

Population (2011)
  - Total: 8,505

Languages
  - Official: Hindi
- Time zone: UTC+5:30 (IST)
- Vehicle registration: MP-30
- Website: bhind.nic.in

Raun (also spelled Roun or Roan) is a town and a Municipal Council in Bhind District of Madhya Pradesh. It's also a Tehsil Headquarter.

== Geography ==
Raun is situated at 26.34°N 78.93°E. it is 37km from the district headquarters, Bhind. Sindh River flow's near the town.

== Demographics ==
As per the Census of India 2011 Roun town has population of 8,505.

== Transportation ==
Raun is located on major roadways, bhind is 37 km and Lahar is 20 km away from Raun. Public and private buses operate regularly.
