= Pleading (Elgar) =

Edward Elgar in 1917

"Pleading" is a poem written by Arthur L. Salmon, and set to music by the English composer Edward Elgar in 1908, as his Op.48.

This is one of the most popular of Elgar's songs. Elgar had returned home at the end of September 1908, feeling depressed after taking the score of his first Symphony to the publishers. Arthur Salmon had sent him a book of poems, and the loneliness expressed in "Pleading" fitted his mood. He finished the song within a week, and added the orchestration the next month. He wrote the song for, and dedicated it to his great friend Lady Maud Warrender.

It was published by Novello & Co. It has been referred to as Elgar's Op. 48, No. 1, as if a set of songs had been planned for Lady Maud Warrender, but no other Op. 48 songs are known.

== Lyrics ==
PLEADING

Will you come homeward from the hills of Dreamland,

Home in the dusk, and speak to me again?

Tell me the stories that I am forgetting,

Quicken my hopes, and recompense my pain?

Will you come homeward from the hills of Dreamland?

I have grown weary, though I wait for you yet;

Watching the fallen leaf, the faith grown fainter,

The memory smoulder’d to a dull regret.

Shall the remembrance die in dim forgetting–

All the fond light that glorified my way?

Will you come homeward from the hills of Dreamland,

Home in the dusk, and turn my night to day?

== Recordings ==
- Songs and Piano Music by Edward Elgar has "Pleading" performed by Mark Wilde (tenor), with David Owen Norris (piano).
- Elgar: Complete Songs for Voice & Piano Amanda Roocroft (soprano), Reinild Mees (piano)
- Elgar: The Collector's Edition, CD 29 Robert Tear (tenor), City of Birmingham Symphony Orchestra, Vernon Handley (conductor)
- The Songs of Edward Elgar SOMM CD 220 Catherine Wyn-Rogers (soprano) with Malcolm Martineau (piano), at Southlands College, London, April 1999
