= A Song of Flight =

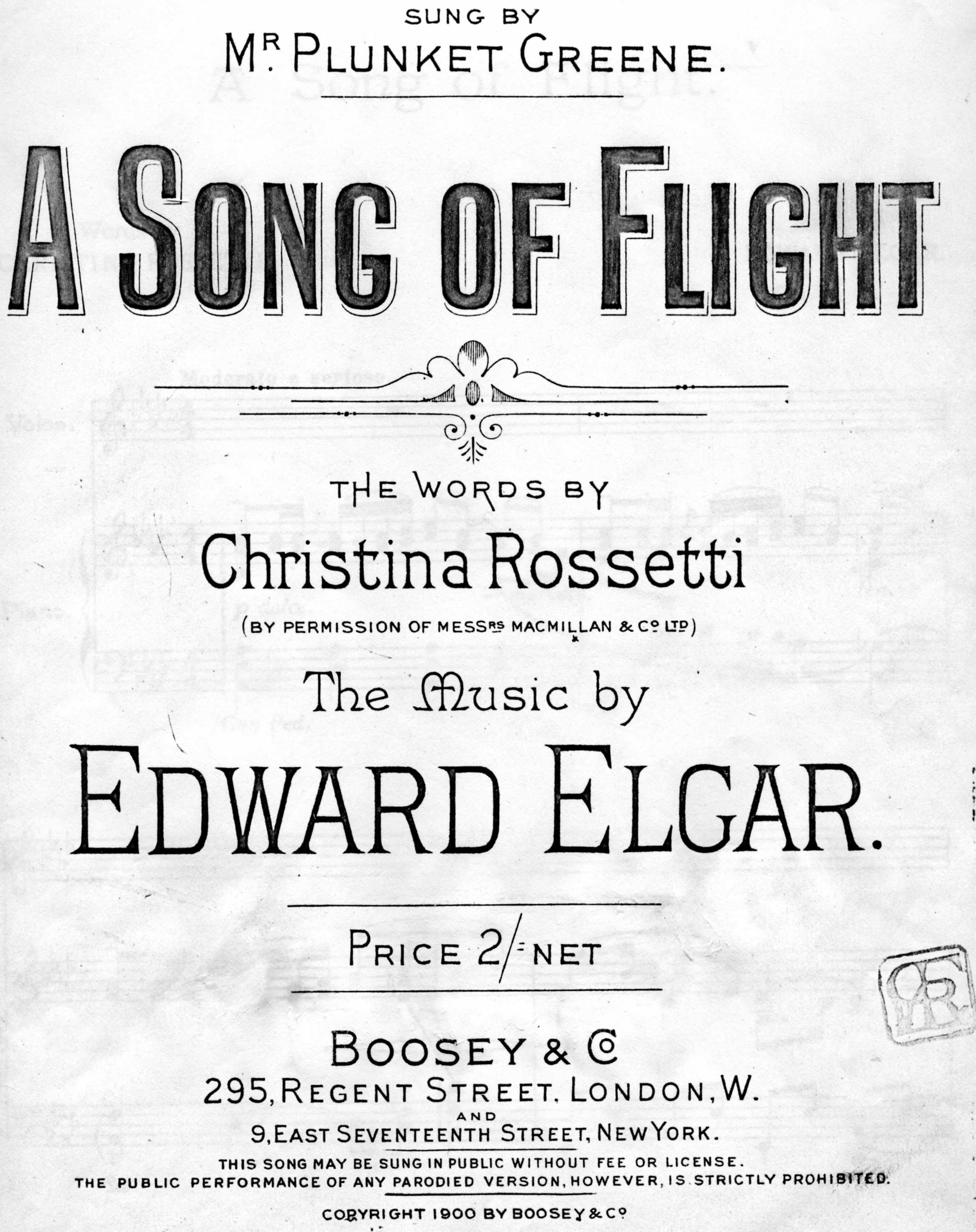

"A Song of Flight" is a song written by the English composer Edward Elgar in 1895, as his Op. 31, No. 2, with the words from a poem by Christina Rossetti.

The song was first performed by the Irish baritone Harry Plunket Greene in St. James's Hall on 2 March 1900, together with After, Op. 31, No. 1.

== Lyrics ==
A SONG OF FLIGHT

While we slumber and sleep
The sun leaps up from the deep.
Daylight born at the leap!

Rapid, dominant, free,
Athirst to bathe in the uttermost sea.

While we linger at play,
If the year would stand at May!
Winds are up and away

Over land, over sea,
To their goal wherever their goal may be.

It is time to arise
To race for the promised prize,
The Sun flies, the Wind flies.

We are strong, we are free,
And home lies beyond the stars and the sea.
