= Ater Fort =

17th century Indian fort

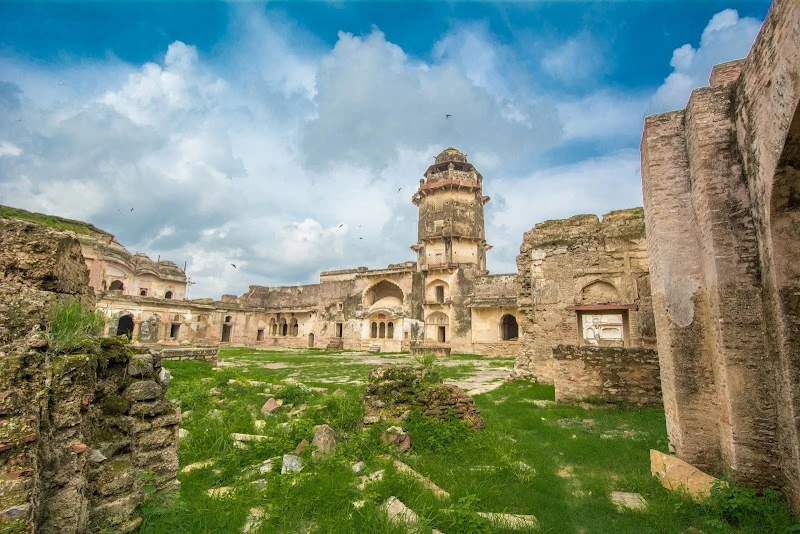

- Location in Madhya Pradesh Location in India
- 26.748°N 78.637°E
- Location: Bhind district, Madhya Pradesh, India

History
- Built: 1664-1668

Site notes
- Architect: Mia Tashe Khan
- Architectural styles: Bhadawari and Mughal influence

Ater Fort is a fort located 35 km (22 mi) west of Bhind in Bhind district, Madhya Pradesh, India. It was built by Bhadauria kings Badan Singh, Maha Singh and Bakhat Singh between 1664 and 1668.

The architecture of the fort is based on Rajput style . The fort was invaded by the Maratha sent by Bajirao under Malhar Rao Holkar command in March 1737 A.D. The Maharaja of Bhadawar, Maharaja Aniruddh Singh was the political ally of the Nawab of Awadh, Saadat Khan. The Nawab of Awadh marched to Ater via Kachora Ghat. The coalition forces of Bhadawar and Awadh surrounded the Marathas in the battle did not lasted for a long time and Malhar Rao Holkar fled from the engagement. The Coalition forces of Awadh and Bhadawar persuaded him (Malhar Rao Holkar) upto Gwalior. Bajirao with his 8,000 cavalry at Dholpur retired to Bundelkhand after the defeat of one of his powerful general. This failed expedition also dismantles the statement that "Bajirao was undefeated or invincible commander".

== Architecture ==
Khooni Darwaza, Badan Singh Ka Mahal, Hathiapor, Raja Ka Bangla, Rani Ka Bangla and Barah Khamba Mahal are some of the structures present in the fort.

== See also ==
- Ater, Madhya Pradesh
