= After 7 (disambiguation) =

After 7 is an American R&B group.

After 7 may also refer to:

- After 7 (After 7 album), 1989
- After 7 (Lay Bankz album), 2024
