= Surghan =

Village in Madhya Pradesh, India

- Postal code: 477441
- Area code: 0751
- Vehicle registration: MP30

Surghan is a village in Bhind district and it which comes under Mihona Tehsil and it comes under Lahar Vidhan Sabha. Which is an assembly constituency in Bhind district in the Indian state of Madhya Pradesh. As of 2011 India census, Surghan has a population of over 650.

== Geography ==
Surghan is located at 26.2886301°N 79.045255°E.

== Transportation ==
Near Bus Stand- Under 10 km | Mihona, Lahar, Bhind

Nearest Railway Station under 50 km | Bhind, Gwalior, Etawah

Nearest Airport under 130–150 km | Gwalior, Jhansi
