= Speak, Music! =

1901 song by Edward Elgar

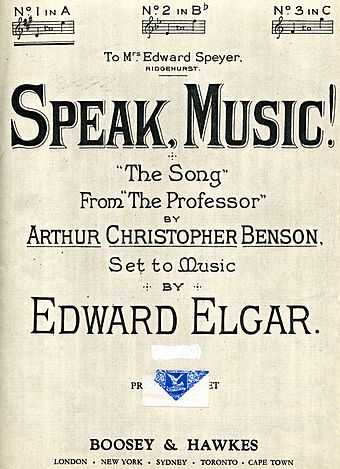

Speak, Music! is a song written by the English composer Edward Elgar in 1901 as his Op.41, No.2.

The words are from The Song in the book of verse The Professor, and other poems by A. C. Benson. It was dedicated to 'Mrs. Edward Speyer, Ridgehurst'.

At about the same time Elgar wrote a song In the Dawn, as his Op. 41, No. 1, with words from the same poem. The two songs were first performed in the Queen's Hall on 26 October 1901.

== Lyrics ==
SPEAK, MUSIC

Speak, speak, music, and bring to me
Fancies too fleet for me,
Sweetness too sweet for me,
Wake, wake, voices, and sing to me,

Sing to me tenderly; bid me rest.

Rest, Rest! ah, I am fain of it!
Die, Hope! small was my gain of it!

Song, [song] take thy parable,
Whisper, whisper that all is well,

Say, say that there tarrieth
Something, something more true than death.

Waiting to smile for me; bright and blest.

Thrill, thrill, string: echo and play for me
All, all that the poet, the priest cannot say for me;
Soar, voice, soar, heavenwards, and pray for me,

Wondering, wandering; bid me rest.

== Music ==
The uncommon time signature 15/8 is not found in any of Elgar's other songs.

== Recordings ==
- Songs and Piano Music by Edward Elgar has "Speak, Music" performed by Mark Wilde (tenor), with David Owen Norris (piano).
- Elgar: Complete Songs for Voice & Piano Amanda Roocroft (soprano), Reinild Mees (piano)
- The Songs of Edward Elgar SOMM CD 220 Catherine Wyn-Rogers (soprano) with Malcolm Martineau (piano), at Southlands College, London, April 1999
