= In the Dawn =

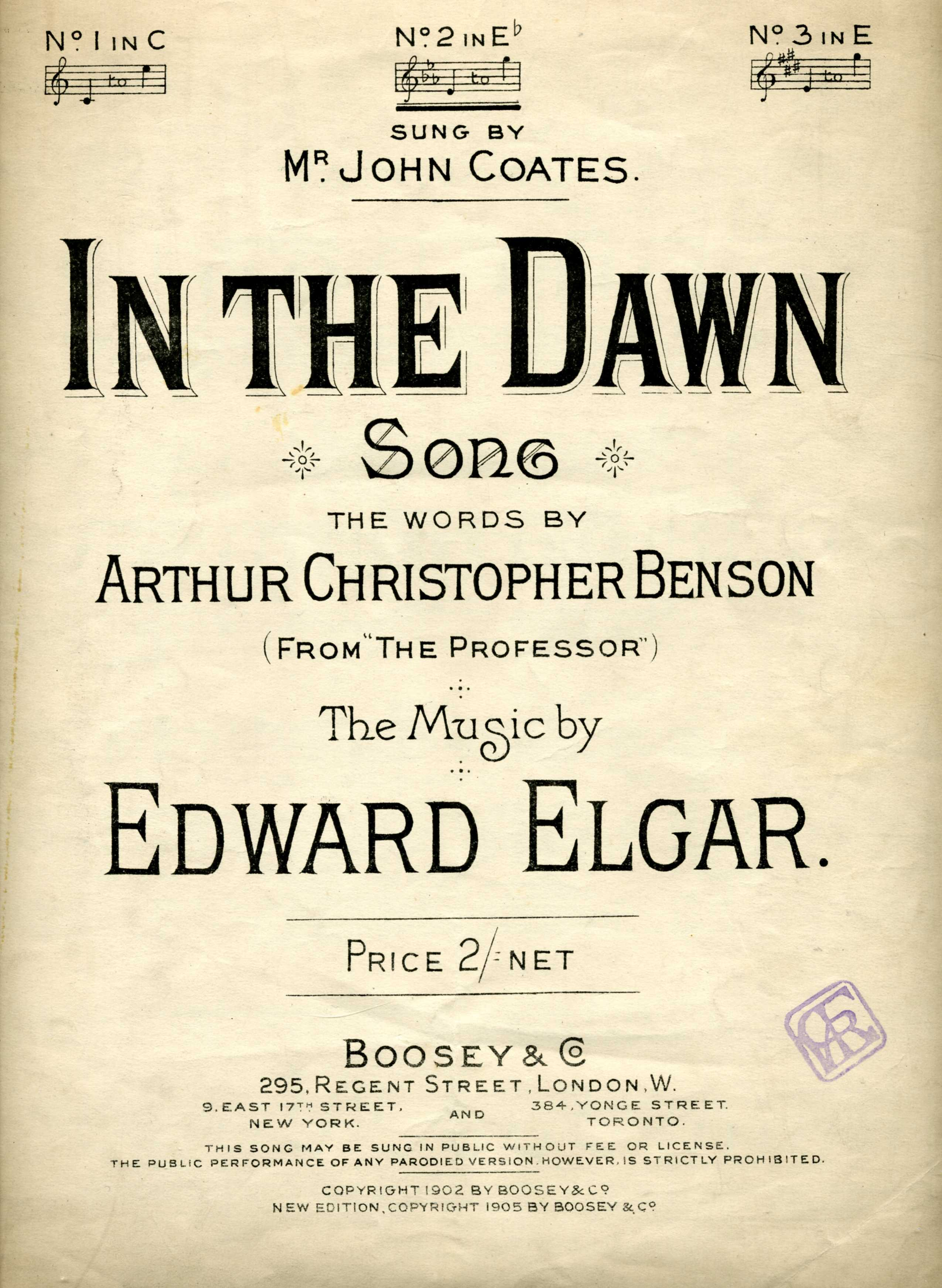

In the Dawn is a song written by the English composer Edward Elgar in 1901 as his Op.41, No.1.

The words are from a poem in the book of verse The Professor and other poems by Arthur Christopher Benson.

At about the same time Elgar wrote a song Speak, Music!, as his Op.41, No.2, with words from the same poem.

The two songs were first performed in the Queen's Hall on 26 October 1901. The cover of the song, published by Boosey & Co, indicates that it was sung by John Coates (tenor), who recorded the song in 1915.

== Lyrics ==
Some souls have quickened, eye to eye,

And heart to heart, and hand in hand;

The swift fire leaps, and instantly

They understand.

Henceforth they can be cold no more;

Woes there may be, ay, tears and blood,

But not the numbness, as before

They understood.

Henceforth, though ages roll

Across wild wastes of sand and brine,

Whate’er betide, one human soul

Is knit with mine.

Whatever joy be dearly bought,

Whatever hope my bosom stirs,

The straitest cell of secret thought

Is wholly hers.

Ay, were I parted, life would be

A helpless, heartless flight along

Blind tracks in vales of misery

And sloughs of wrong.

Nay, God forgive me!

Life would roll like some dim moon thro’ cloudy bars;

But to have loved her sets my soul

Among the stars.

== Recordings ==
- An early recording, probably the first, was made on 14 April 1915 by John Coates for the Gramophone Company 02583 (matrix HO 751ac).
- Songs and Piano Music by Edward Elgar has "In the Dawn" performed by Mark Wilde (tenor), with David Owen Norris (piano).
- Elgar: Complete Songs for Voice & Piano Amanda Roocroft (soprano), Reinild Mees (piano)
- The Songs of Edward Elgar SOMM CD 220 Neil Mackie (tenor) with Malcolm Martineau (piano), at Southlands College, London, April 1999
