= Shervin Lainez =

Shervin Lainez is a music photographer who was born in Washington, DC He currently resides in Brooklyn, New York.

Lainez began his career in DC photographing independent bands, and went on to photograph the likes of Regina Spektor, St. Vincent, Sara Bareilles, Tame Impala, Panic! at the Disco, Wilco, Phoenix, Chvrches, and Ellie Goulding, Alabama Shakes, Tegan and Sara, The Decemberists, My Morning Jacket, and Broken Social Scene. His distinctive style of portraits captures a direct and stylized snapshot of each musician he shoots.

Lainez's photographs have appeared in publications throughout the world, including Spin, Wall Street Journal, The New York Times, Rolling Stone, and Billboard.
