= After (Elgar) =

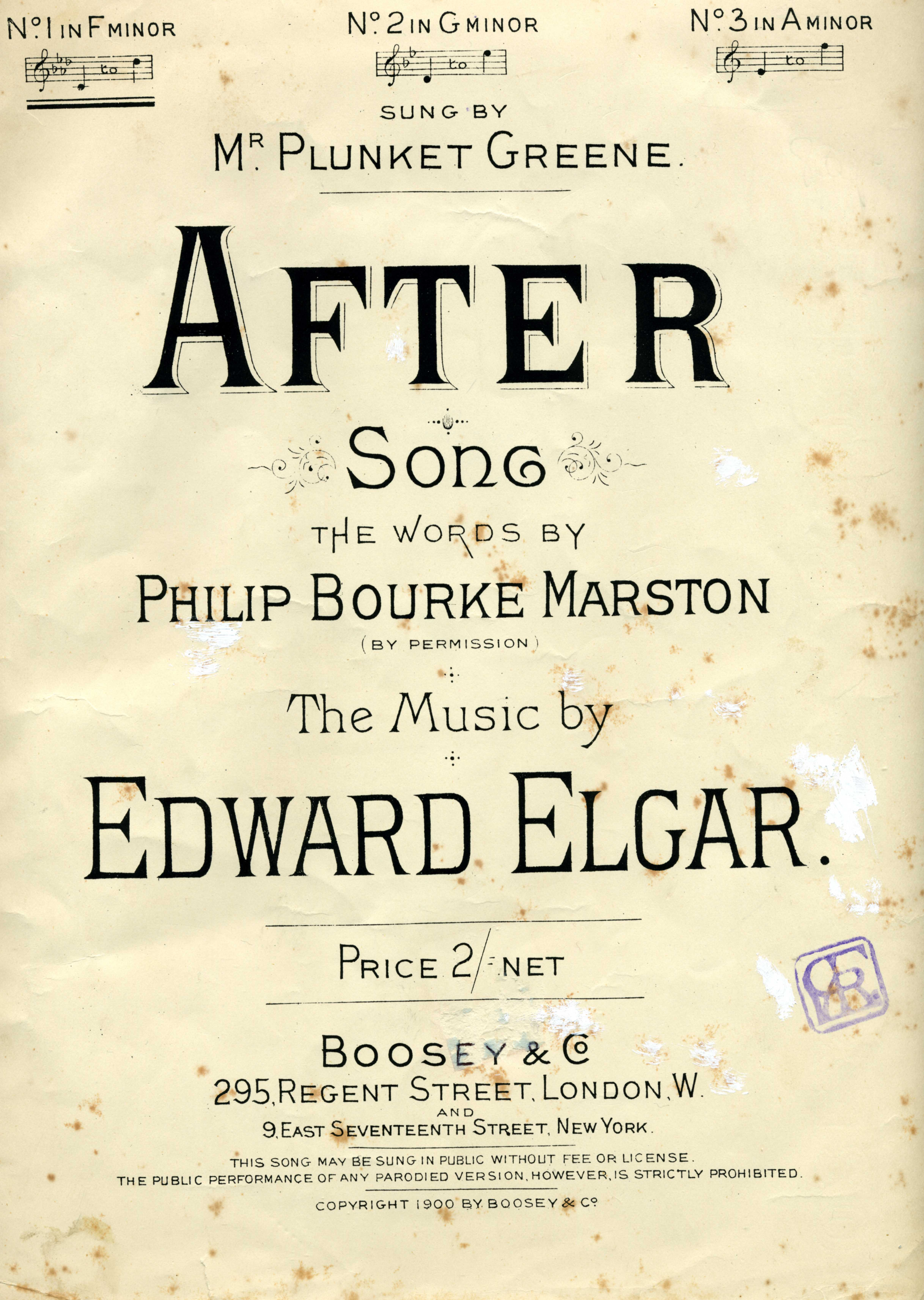

"After" is a song written by the English composer Edward Elgar in 1895, as his Op. 31, No. 1, with the words from a poem by Philip Bourke Marston.

The manuscript is dated 21 June 1895.

The song was first performed by the Irish baritone Harry Plunket Greene in St. James's Hall on 2 March 1900, together with A Song of Flight, Op. 31, No. 2.

== Lyrics ==
A little time for laughter,
A little time to sing,
A little time to kiss and cling,
And no more kissing after.

A little while for scheming
Love's unperfected schemes;
A little time for golden dreams,
Then no more any dreaming.

A little while 'twas given
To me to have thy love;
Now, like a ghost, alone I move
About a ruined heaven.

A little time for speaking
Things sweet to say and hear;
A time to seek, and find thee near,
Then no more any seeking.

A little time for saying
Words the heart breaks to say;
A short, sharp time wherein to pray,
Then no more need for praying;

But long, long years to weep in,
And comprehend the whole
Great grief, that desolates the soul,
And eternity to sleep in.

== Recordings ==
- Songs and Piano Music by Edward Elgar has "After" performed by Amanda Pitt (soprano), with David Owen Norris (piano).
