= Bhind district =

District of Madhya Pradesh in India

- District of Madhya Pradesh
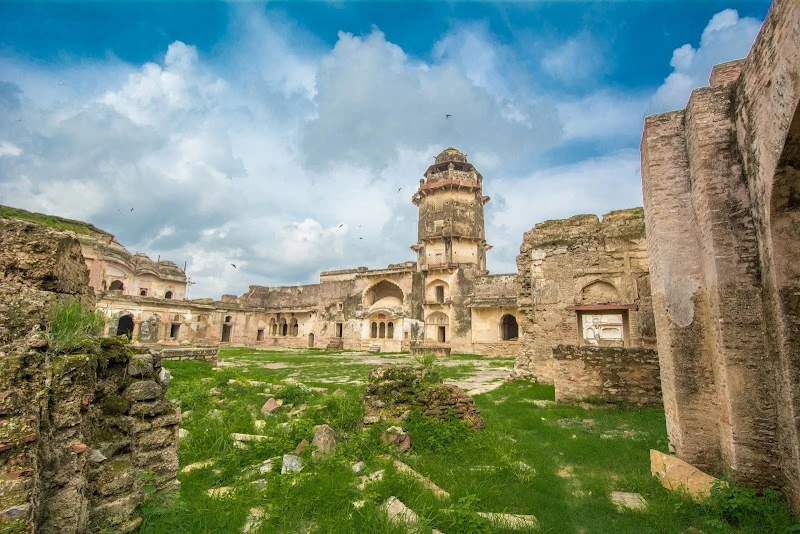
- Fort of Ater

- Location of Bhind district in Madhya Pradesh
- Coordinates (Bhind): 26.6°N 78.8°E
- Country: India
- State: Madhya Pradesh
- Division: Chambal division
- Headquarters: Bhind
- Tehsils: 10: Bhind Rural, Bhind Urban, Ater, Gormi, Mau, Mehgaon, Gohad, Lahar, Mihona, Raun.

Government
  - District Magistrate: Kirodi Lal Meena, IAS
  - Lok Sabha constituencies: Bhind
  - SP: Asit Yadav, IPS

Area
  - Total: 4,459 km^{2} (1,722 sq mi)

Population (2011)
  - Total: 1,703,005
  - Density: 381.9/km^{2} (989.2/sq mi)

Demographics
  - Literacy: 75.3 per cent
  - Sex ratio: 838

Language
  - Official: Hindi
  - Dialect: Bundeli, Braj bhasha.
- Time zone: UTC+05:30 (IST)
- Vehicle registration: MP-30
- Major highways: NH 719 (earlier NH92)
- Website: bhind.nic.in

Bhind district (Hindi pronunciation: [bʱɪɳɖ]) is a district in the Chambal division of the Indian state of Madhya Pradesh. The district headquarters is Bhind.

== History ==
The region was originally held by the Bhadauria Rajputs (a branch of the Chahamanas of Shakambhari) for twenty-two generations. Bhind as a town was firstly established by the Maharaja of Bhadawar, Badan Singh Devju in the 16th century on the name of his spiritual master, Bhindi Rishi. The town firstly suffered pillage during the raid of Marathas under Bajirao I in 1737 A.D. Later in 1796 A.D., it was invaded by a Maratha general, Pragdas under Daulat Rao Sindhia of Gwalior State. The Raja of Bhadawar had to retire from his capital to Nowgawan.

=== Historical Places of Bhind ===
- Dandraua Hanuman Mandir (Mehgaon) is an ancient Hanuman Mandir. Hanuman ji is best known as Dr. Hanuman.
- Vyankateshwar/Vankhandeshwar Mandir built by Raja Badan Singh of Bhadawar.
- Akoda is the place where Kherapati Hanuman Mandir (Panjay Sarkar). This town is situated 10 km (6.2 mi) from Bhind.
- Naarada (Lahar) is the place where mythological saint Maharshi Narada prayed.
- Pandari is a village in Bhind Tehsil, where Pandavas took refuge during Agyatvas period of their banishment. Pandari is originated from the word Pandav Vati.
- Gauri Tal is a lake built at Bhind town by Raja Badan Singh of Bhadawar.
- Machhand is a village in Mihona Tehsil, noted as the place of penance of Machhendranath, the Guru of Guru Gorakhnath.
- Giant Lingam of lord Shiva at Boreshwarnath temple which is situated in Ater Tehsil at Dulhagan village and contains an ancient Shiva temple.
- Gahiyar baba mandir located in village devgarh Umri.
- Jaaga Sarkar Hanuman Mandir is an famous Hanuman mandir located at Loharpura tehsil Mau Bhind. L L
- Chhatris or Maths of former Raja & Ranis of Bhadawar in Nawada Baag.
- Ater Fort of the Bhadauria Rajas in the Ater Tehsil.

== Geography ==
Bhind is surrounded by Agra, Etawah, Jalaun and Jhansi districts of Uttar Pradesh state to the north and the east, and the Madhya Pradesh districts of Datia to the south, Gwalior to the southwest, and Morena to the west. The geography of the district is characterised by uneven ravines, plain fertile fields and scanty forests. The total area of the district is 4,459 km^{2} (1,722 sq mi).

Bhind's soil is drained by the Chambal, Sindh, Kunwari or Kwari, Pahuj and Baisali rivers aided by an extensive canal system.

== Demographics ==
Historical population
Year	Pop.	±% p.a.
1901	432,296	—
1911	412,684	−0.46%
1921	393,849	−0.47%
1931	430,376	+0.89%
1941	494,059	+1.39%
1951	527,978	+0.67%
1961	641,169	+1.96%
1971	793,955	+2.16%
1981	973,816	+2.06%
1991	1,219,000	+2.27%
2001	1,428,559	+1.60%
2011	1,703,005	+1.77%

Religions in Bhind district (2011)
Religion	Percent
Hinduism	93.68%
Islam	3.92%
Jainism	1.17%
Buddhism	0.72%
Other or not stated	0.51%

According to the 2011 census Bhind District had a population of 1,703,005, roughly equal to the nation of The Gambia or the US state of Nebraska. This gives it a ranking of 286th in India (out of a total of 640).

The district has a population density of 382 inhabitants per square kilometre (990/sq mi). Its population growth rate over the decade 2001-2011 was 19.25%.

Bhind has a sex ratio of 837 females for every 1000 males, and a literacy rate of 64.29%. 25.42% of the population lives in urban areas. Scheduled Castes and Scheduled Tribes make up 22.01% and 0.36% of the population respectively.

Hindi is the predominant language, spoken by 99.59% of the population.

The dominant castes of Bhind are Gadariya, Rajput, Brahmin, Soni, Kushwaha, Kayastha, and Jain with sizeable number of Lodhis and Yadavs.

== Administration ==
Bhind district administration is headed by the District Magistrate of Bhind. The DM is assisted by a chief executive officer (CEO), Additional District Magistrates (ADM) and two Joint Collector.

The district is divided into 5 sub-divisions and 6 development blocks. Each sub-division headed by a Sub Divisional magistrate. It is further divided into 10 tehsils.

1	Bhind Nagar
2	Bhind Rural
3	Ater
4	Lahar
5	Mehgoan
6	Mau
7	Roun
8	Mihona
9	Gohad
10	Gormi

== Tourist attractions ==
=== Chhatri of Malhar Rao Holkar, Alampur ===
Maharani Ahilyabai Holkar built the chhatri of Malhar Rao Holkar at Alampur in Bhind district in 1766. It is marked by carvings. It is built on the pattern of the chhatris of Holkar rulers at Indore.

=== Shri Rawatpura Dham ===
The temple of Hindu Lord Hanuman is situated at Lahar tehsil of Bhind. This place is known as Rawatpura Dham and is under in Lahar tehsil.

=== Fort of Ater ===
Ater Fort was built by king Badan Singh Bhadauria from 1664 to 1668. The Fort of Ater is located near Ater town, 35 km (22 mi) from Bhind and 40 km (25 mi) from Porsa Morena.

=== National Chambal (Gharial) Wildlife Sanctuary ===
National Chambal (Gharial) Wildlife Sanctuary is situated on the Chambal River, and is inhabited by crocodiles, ghariyals, Ganges dolphins, and migratory birds. A boat cruise is organised by local forest officials. The sanctuary is 22 kilometres (14 mi) from Bhind town.

=== Gohad Fort ===
Gohad Fort was built by the bamrolia Jats in 1505. Government offices are currently situated on its premises.

=== Ancient Dandraua Temple Mehgaon Tehsil ===
This is a temple to the Hindu God Hanuman, believed to possess curing powers. Worshipers go to the temple every Tuesday and Saturday. Another Panchmukhi Hanuman mandir in Heerapura 10 km (6.2 mi) from Lahar.

== Notable personalities ==
- Kaptan Singh Solanki
- Satendra Singh Lohiya
- Arvind Singh Bhadoria
- Bhagirath Prasad
- Govind Singh
- Satyadev Katare
- Chaudhary Rakesh Singh Chaturvedi
- Mukul Trivedi IFS

== Villages ==
- Kanawar
- Kachaungara
- Phoop
- Nahara
- Kosad
- Chillonga
- Jampura
- Bharoli
- Bilav
- Barakalan
- Nayagaon
- Devgarh
- Akoda
- Bhadakur
- Roor
- Umari
- Deenpura
- Manphoolpura
- Jabarpura
- Motipura (ahir)
- Kiti
- Gehvad
- Kripekapura
