= Sirmour Assembly constituency =

Constituency of the Madhya Pradesh legislative assembly in India

Coordinates: 24.84°N 81.36°E

Sirmour
- Constituency No. 68 for the Madhya Pradesh Legislative Assembly

Constituency details
- Country: India
- Region: Central India
- State: Madhya Pradesh
- District: Rewa
- Lok Sabha constituency: Rewa
- Established: 1951
- Reservation: None

Member of Legislative Assembly
- 16th Madhya Pradesh Legislative Assembly
- Incumbent Divyaraj Singh
- Party: Bharatiya Janata Party
- Elected year: 2023
- Preceded by: Rajkumar Urmaliya

Sirmour Assembly constituency (or Sirmaur) is one of the 230 Vidhan Sabha (Legislative Assembly) constituencies of Madhya Pradesh state in central India. This constituency came into existence in 1951, as one of the 48 Vidhan Sabha constituencies of the erstwhile Vindhya Pradesh state.

== Overview ==
Sirmour (constituency number 68) is one of the eight Vidhan Sabha constituencies located in Rewa district. This constituency comprises Sirmour Revenue Inspector's (R.I.) circle of Sirmour tehsil, Sirmaur nagar panchayat, Baikunthpur nagar panchayat and Dabhaura and Jawa R.I. circles of Teonthar tehsil.

Sirmour is part of Rewa Lok Sabha constituency along with seven other Vidhan Sabha segments of this district, namely, Semariya, Teonthar, Mauganj, Deotalab, Mangawan, Rewa, and Gurh.

== Members of Legislative Assembly ==
=== Vindhya Pradesh Legislative Assembly ===
Election	Name	Party
1952	Narmada Prasad Singh	Kisan Mazdoor Praja Party

=== Madhya Pradesh Legislative Assembly ===
Election	Name	Party
1957	Champa Devi	Indian National Congress
1962	Jamuna Prasad	Praja Socialist Party
1967	Jamuna Prasad	Praja Socialist Party
1972	Rajmani Patel	Indian National Congress
1977	Sita Prasad Sharma	Janata Party
1980	Rajmani Patel	Indian National Congress (Indira)
1985	Rajmani Patel	Indian National Congress
1990	Ramlakhan Sharma	Janata Dal
1993	Ramlakhan Sharma	Communist Party of India (Marxist)
1998	Rajmani Patel	Indian National Congress
2003	Ramlakhan Sharma	Communist Party of India (Marxist)
2008	Rajkumar Urmaliya	Bahujan Samaj Party
2013	Divyaraj Singh	Bharatiya Janata Party
2018	Divyaraj Singh	Bharatiya Janata Party
2023	Divyaraj Singh	Bharatiya Janata Party

== Election results ==
=== 2023 ===
2023 Madhya Pradesh Legislative Assembly election: Sirmour
Party	Candidate	Votes	%	±%
BJP	Divyaraj Singh	54,875	38.42	−0.53
BSP	V. D. Pandey	41,085	28.77	+14.22
INC	Ramgarib Vanvasi	35,560	24.9	−3.49
SP	Laxman Tiwari	2,065	1.45	−7.33
CPI(M)	Kanti Kumar Dubey	1,688	1.18	+0.86
Rashtravadi Bharat Party	Er. Avinash Shukla	1,379	0.97	
NOTA	None of the above	920	0.64	+0.13
Majority		13,790	9.65	−0.91
Turnout		142,818	64.62	−0.29
BJP hold		Swing		

=== 2018 ===
2018 Madhya Pradesh Legislative Assembly election: Sirmour
Party	Candidate	Votes	%	±%
BJP	Divyaraj Singh	49,443	38.95	
INC	Aruna Vivek Tiwari	36,042	28.39	
BSP	Ramgarib Banvasi	18,466	14.55	
SP	Pradeep Singh Patna	11,144	8.78	
Sapaks Party	Satish Shukla	1,564	1.23	
NOTA	None of the above	651	0.51	
Majority		13,401	10.56	
Turnout		126,932	64.91	
BJP gain from		Swing		

== See also ==
- Sirmaur
