= Rewa Lok Sabha constituency =

Lok Sabha Constituency in Madhya Pradesh

Coordinates: 24.55°N 81.29°E

Rewa
- Lok Sabha constituency
- Interactive Map Outlining Rewa Lok Sabha constituency

Constituency details
- Country: India
- Region: Central India
- State: Madhya Pradesh
- Assembly constituencies: Sirmour; Semariya; Teonthar; Mauganj; Deotalab; Mangawan; Rewa; Gurh
- Established: 1951
- Total electors: 18,52,126
- Reservation: None

Member of Parliament
- 18th Lok Sabha
- Incumbent Janardan Mishra
- Party: Bharatiya Janata Party
- Elected year: 2019

Rewa Lok Sabha constituency is one of the 29 Lok Sabha constituencies in Madhya Pradesh state in central India. This constituency came into existence in 1951 as one of the 4 constituencies in Vindhya Pradesh state. This constituency presently covers the entire Rewa district.

== Assembly segments ==
Before delimitation of parliamentary constituencies in 2008, Rewa Lok Sabha constituency comprised the following eight Vidhan Sabha (legislative assembly) segments:

#	Name	District	Member	Party	2024 Lead
68	Sirmour	Rewa	Divyaraj Singh	BJP	BJP
69	Semariya	Rewa	Abhay Mishra	INC	BJP
70	Teonthar	Rewa	Sidhhrath Tiwari	BJP	BJP
71	Mauganj	Rewa	Pradip Patel	BJP	BJP
72	Deotalab	Rewa	Girish Gautam	BJP	BJP
73	Mangawan (SC)	Rewa	Narendra Prajapati	BJP	BJP
74	Rewa	Rewa	Rajendra Shukla	BJP	BJP
75	Gurh	Rewa	Nagendra Singh	BJP	BJP

== Members of Parliament ==
Indian National Congress is the most successful political party in Rewa Lok Sabha elections.
1. INC (6 terms) (33.3%)
2. BJP (5 terms) (27.8%)
3. BSP (3 terms) (16.7%)
4. Independent (2 terms) (11.1%)
5. JP (1 term) (5.56%)
6. JD (1 term) (5.56%)

Year	Member	Party
1952	Rajbhan Singh Tiwari	Indian National Congress
1957	Shiv Dutt Upadhyaya	Indian National Congress
1962	Shiv Dutt Upadhyaya	Indian National Congress
1967	S.N.Shukla	Indian National Congress
1971	Martand Singh Ju Deo	Independent
1977	Yamuna Prasad Shastri	Janata Party
1980	Martand Singh Ju Deo	Independent
1984	Martand Singh Ju Deo	Indian National Congress
1989	Yamuna Prasad Shastri	Janata Dal
1991	Bheem Singh Patel	Bahujan Samaj Party
1996	Buddhasen Patel	Bahujan Samaj Party
1998	Chandramani Tripathi	Bharatiya Janata Party
1999	Sundar Lal Tiwari	Indian National Congress
2004	Chandramani Tripathi	Bharatiya Janata Party
2009	Deoraj Singh Patel	Bahujan Samaj Party
2014	Janardan Mishra	Bharatiya Janata Party
2019	Janardan Mishra	Bharatiya Janata Party
2024	Janardan Mishra	Bharatiya Janata Party

== Election results ==
Lok Sabha	Poll Date	Turnout	Winner				Runner-up				Margin	
Lok Sabha	Poll Date	Turnout	Party	Candidate	Votes	%	Party	Candidate	Votes	%	Votes	%
1st Lok Sabha	27/3/1952	34.36	INC	Rajbhan Singh Tiwari	26,549	27.19	KMPP	Kamlakar Singh	23,248	23.81	3301	3.38
2nd Lok Sabha	25/2/1957	35.46	INC	Shiv Dutt Upadhyaya	41,745	29.74	RRP	Ram Kumar Shastri	25,658	18.28	16,087	11.46
3rd Lok Sabha	19/2/1962	47.4	INC	Shiv Dutt Upadhyaya	56,616	28.28	Socialist	Acheelal Singh	42,441	21.2	14175	7.08
4th Lok Sabha	15/2/1967	60.68	INC	S.N.Shukla	1,40,468	41.4	SSP	M Singh	82,629	24.3	57,839	17.1
5th Lok Sabha	3/1/1971	61.57	Independent	Martand Singh	2,59,136	74.2	INC	S.N.Shukla	59,442	17.02	1,99,694	57.18
6th Lok Sabha	16/3/1977	58.25	JP	Yamuna Prasad Shastri	1,76,634	48.14	Independent	Martand Singh	1,69,941	46.31	6693	1.82
7th Lok Sabha	3/1/1980	57.26	Independent	Martand Singh	2,94,234	73.43	JP	Yamuna Prasad Shastri	55,883	13.95	2,38,351	59.49
8th Lok Sabha	24/12/1984	56.44	INC	Martand Singh	2,23,619	50.94	JP	Yamuna Prasad Shastri	1,06,790	24.32	1,16,829	26.61
9th Lok Sabha	22/11/1989	50.73	JD	Yamuna Prasad Shastri	2,15,420	41.15	INC	Praveen Kumari	1,40,664	26.87	74,756	14.28
10th Lok Sabha	26/5/1991	42.11	BSP	Bheem Singh Patel	1,45,373	32.79	INC	Sriniwas Tiwari	1,31,057	29.56	14,316	3.23
11th Lok Sabha	7/5/1996	46.84	BSP	Buddhasen Patel	1,58,379	26.91	BJP	Praveen Kumari	1,45,997	24.81	12,382	2.1
12th Lok Sabha	28/2/1998	58.84	BJP	Chandramani Tripathi	2,76,367	36.68	BSP	Bheem Singh Patel	2,07,394	27.53	68,973	9.15
13th Lok Sabha	18/9/1999	54.64	INC	Sundar Lal Tiwari	2,75,115	37.19	BSP	Ramlakhan Singh Patel	2,10,964	28.52	64,151	8.67
14th Lok Sabha	5/5/2004	43.17	BJP	Chandramani Tripathi	2,32,021	36.78	BSP	Pradeep Kumar Patel	1,87,269	29.69	44,752	7.1
15th Lok Sabha	23/4/2009	48.34	BSP	Deoraj Singh Patel	1,72,002	28.49	INC	Sundar Lal Tiwari	1,67,726	27.83	4021	0.67
16th Lok Sabha	10/4/2014	53.73	BJP	Janardan Mishra	3,83,320	46.17	INC	Sundar Lal Tiwari	2,14,594	25.85	1,68,726	20.32
17th Lok Sabha	6/5/2019	60.41	BJP	Janardan Mishra	5,83,745	57.61	INC	Siddharth Tiwari "Raj"	2,70,938	26.74	3,12,807	20.87

=== General Elections 2024 ===
2024 Indian general election: Rewa
Party	Candidate	Votes	%	±%
BJP	Janardan Mishra	477,459	52.00	−5.61
INC	Neelam Abhay Mishra	2,85,085	30.94	+4.2
BSP	Adv. Abhishek Master Buddhsen Patel	1,17,221	12.77	+3.78
NOTA	None of the above	6,936	0.76	+0.47
Majority		1,93,374	11.06	−9.81
Turnout		9,18,129	49.43	▼10.98
BJP hold		Swing		

=== General Elections 2019 ===
2019 Indian general elections: Rewa
Party	Candidate	Votes	%	±%
BJP	Janardan Mishra	583,745	57.61	+11.44
INC	Siddharth Tiwari "Raj"	2,70,938	26.74	+0.89
BSP	Vikas Singh Patel	91,126	8.99	−12.16
CPI(M)	Girijesh Singh Sengar	10,453	1.03	new
NOTA	None of the above	2,891	0.29	−0.99
Margin of victory		3,12,807	20.87	+0.55
Turnout		10,14,632	60.41	+6.68
BJP gain from INC		Swing		

=== General Elections 2014 ===
2014 Indian general elections: Rewa
Party	Candidate	Votes	%	±%
BJP	Janardan Mishra	383,320	46.17	+26.9
INC	Sundar Lal Tiwari	2,14,594	25.85	−1.98
BSP	Deoraj Singh Patel	1,75,567	21.15	−7.34
SAP	Abdul Wafati Ansari	7,527	0.91	new
AAP	Purnanand Tiwari	5,835	0.70	new
NOTA	None of the above	10,658	1.28	N/A
Margin of victory		1,68,726	20.32	+19.65
Turnout		8,30,002	53.73	+5.39
BJP gain from BSP		Swing		

=== General Elections 2009 ===
2009 Indian general elections: Rewa
Party	Candidate	Votes	%	±%
BSP	Deoraj Singh Patel	172,002	28.49	N/A
INC	Sunder Lal Tiwari	1,67,981	27.83	N/A
BJP	Chandra Mani Tripathi	1,16,300	19.27	N/A
SP	Pushpraj Singh	1,09,684	18.17	N/A
Margin of victory		4,021	0.67	N/A
Turnout		6,03,641	48.34	N/A
BSP gain from BJP		Swing		

== Towns and villages in Rewa Lok Sabha constituency ==
- Rewa
- Mangawan
- Teonthar
- Mauganj
- Gurh
- Malpar

== See also ==
- Rewa district
- List of constituencies of the Lok Sabha
