= Rewa, Madhya Pradesh =

Rewa The City of Waterfalls
- City
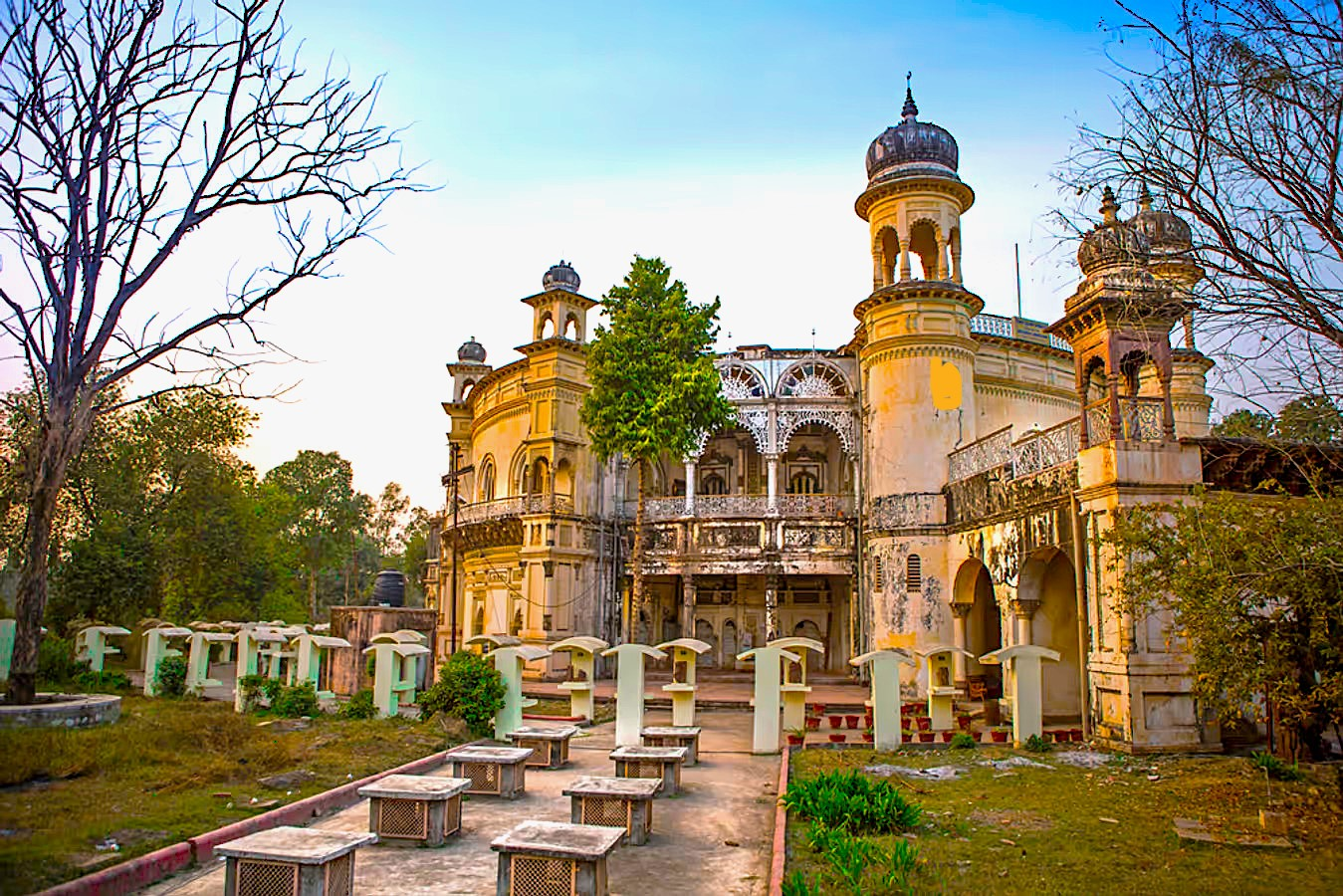
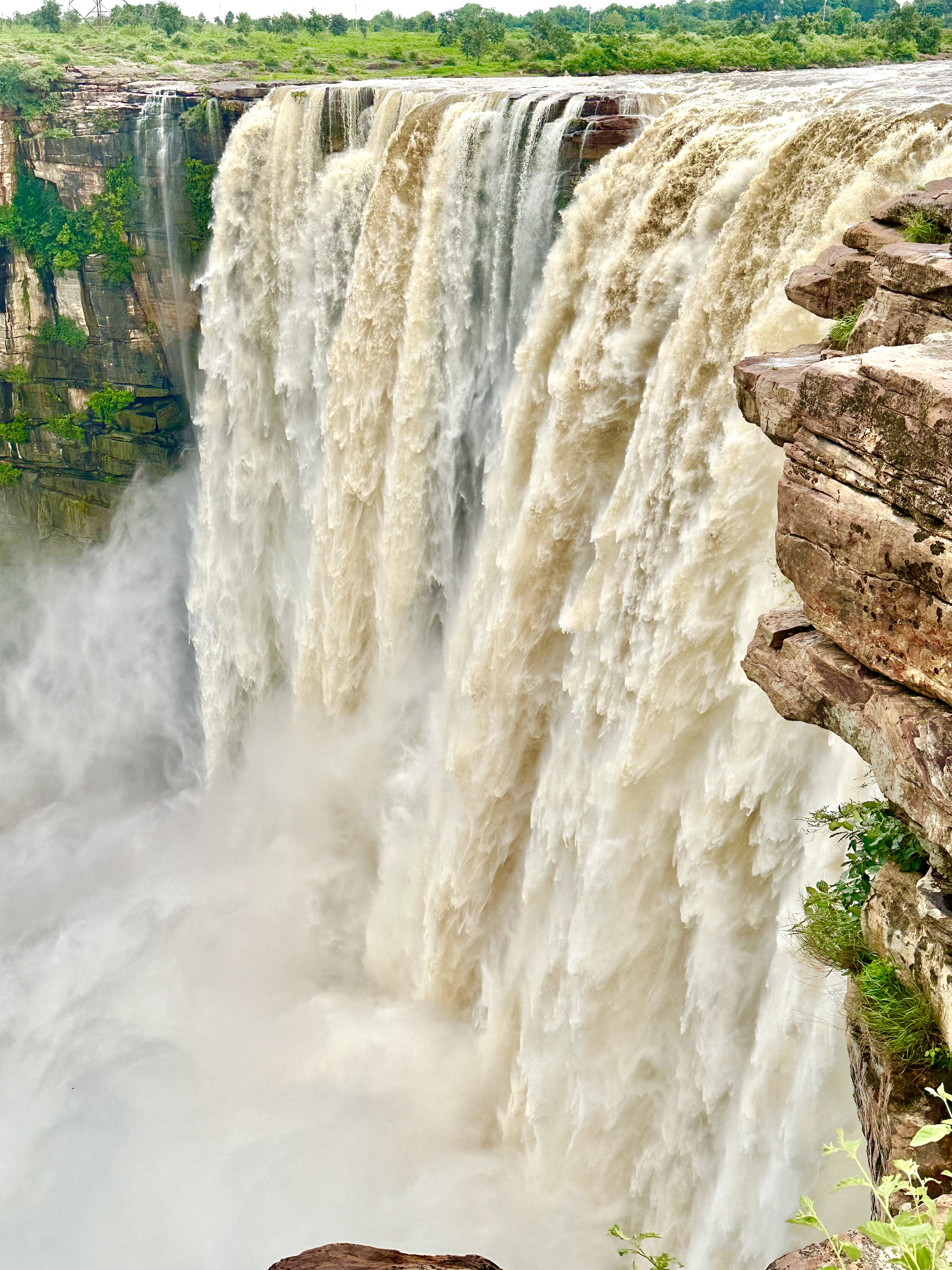
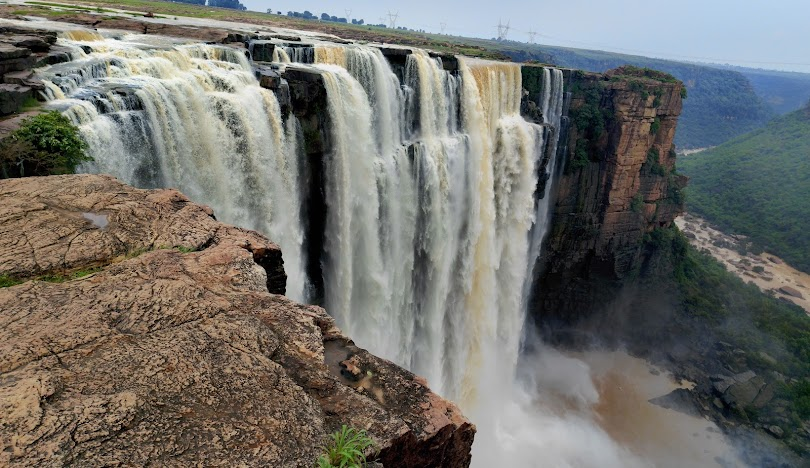
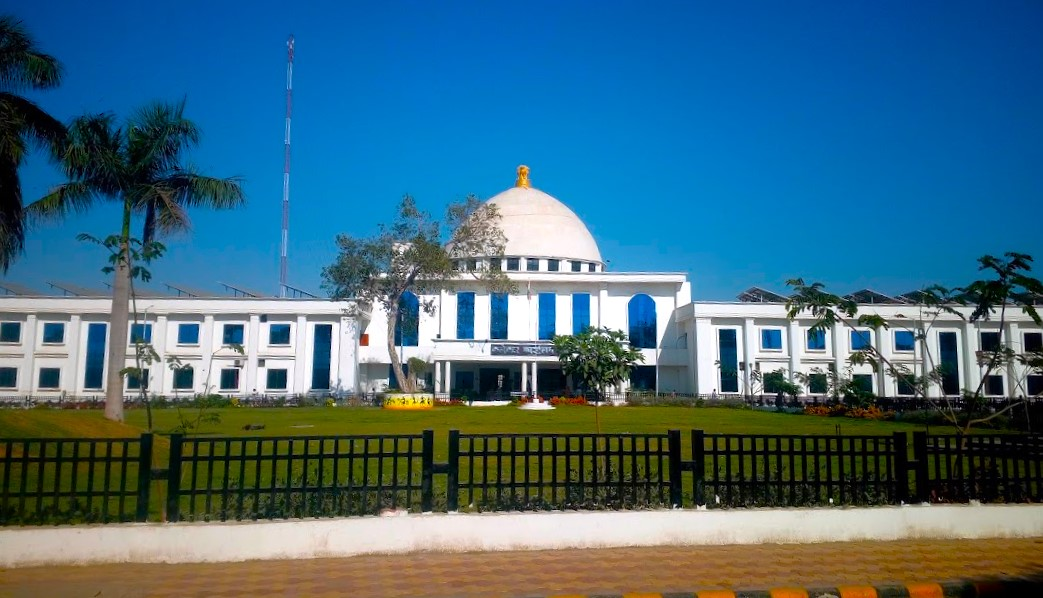
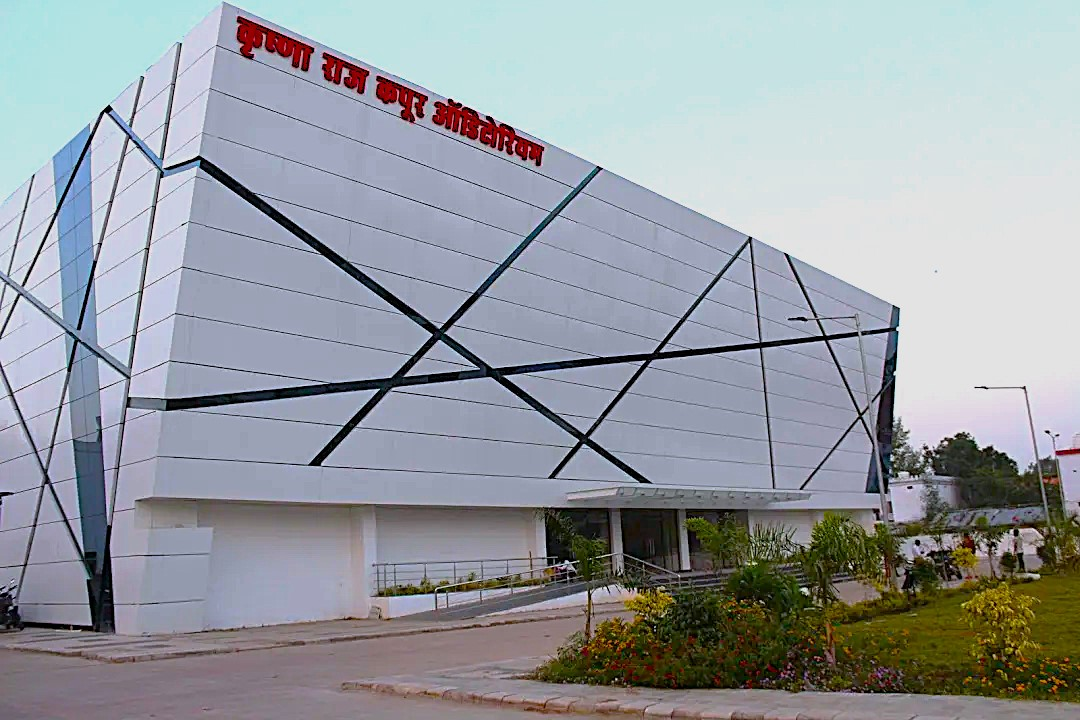
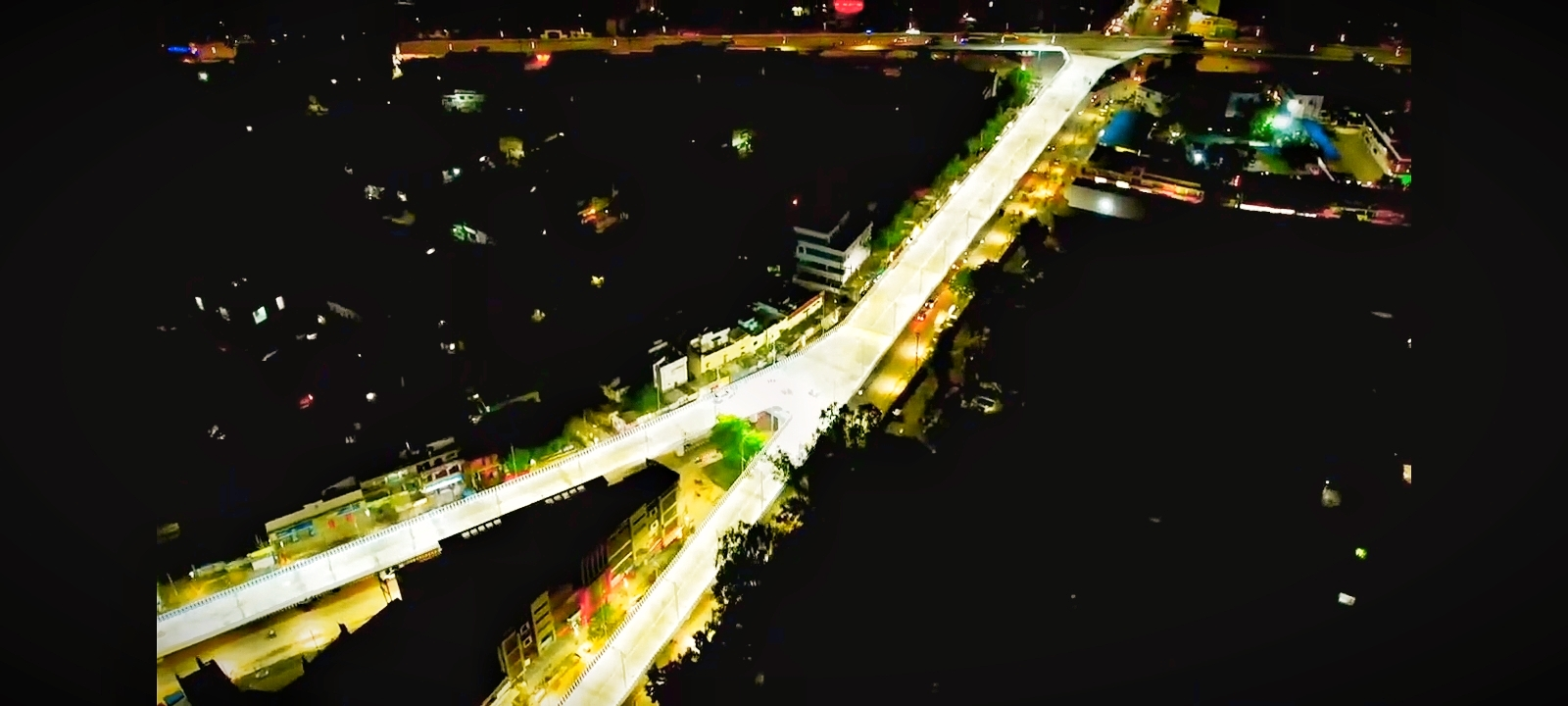
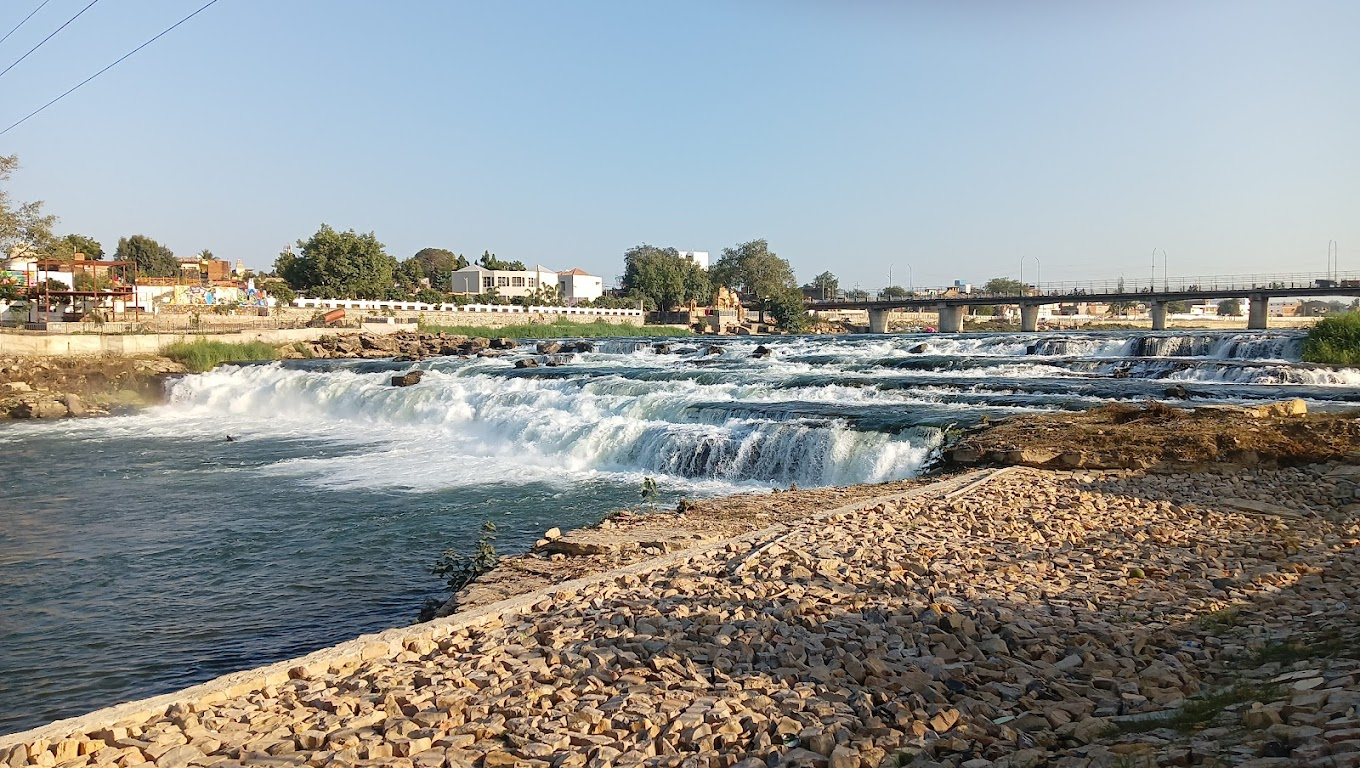
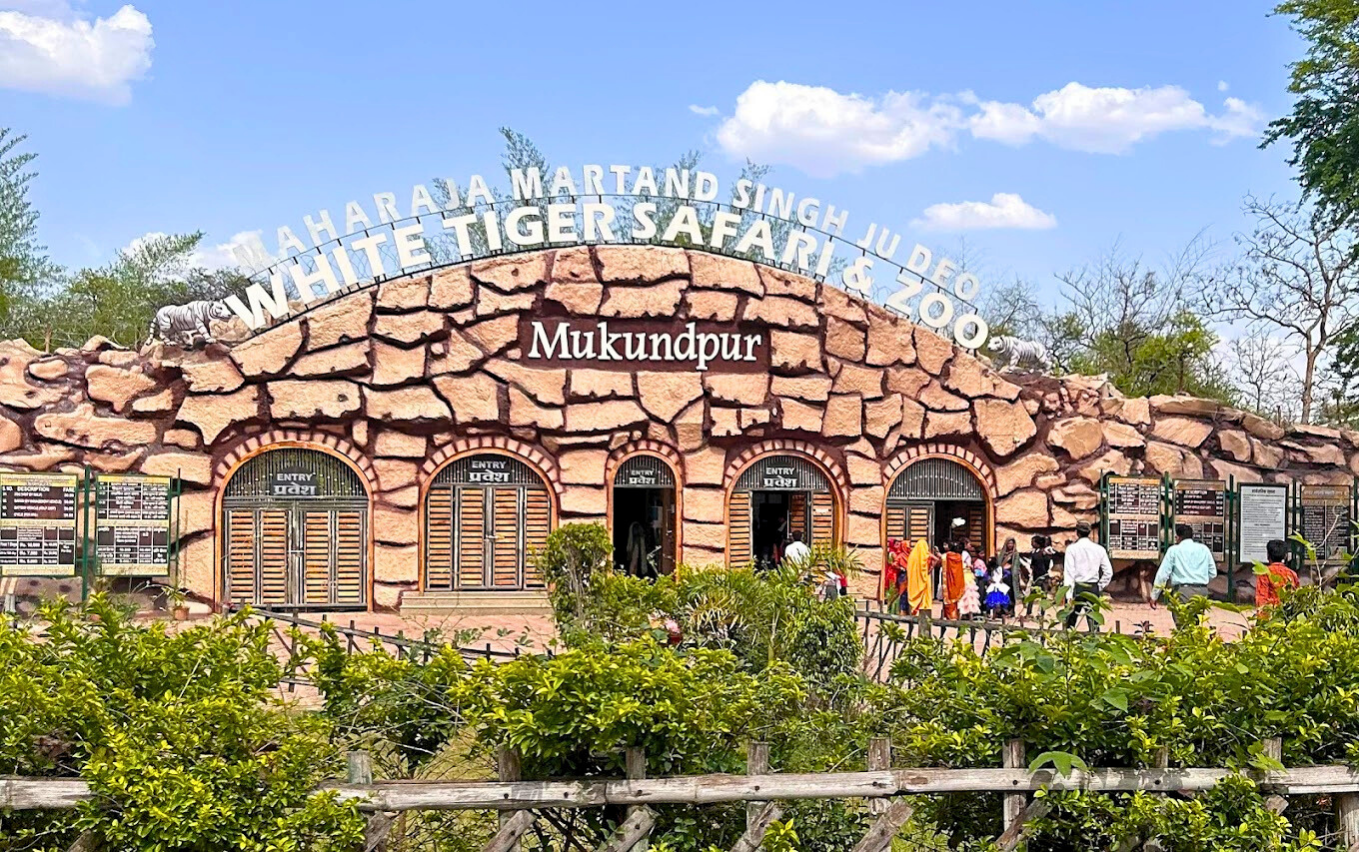
- From top, left to right: Venkat Bhawan,Chachai Falls, Bahuti Falls, Collectorate, Krishna Raj Kapoor Auditorium, Night view Sirmour Chowraha, Eco Park and White Tiger Safari & Zoo Mukundpur

- Location within Madhya Pradesh Location within India
- Coordinates: 24°32′17″N 81°17′43″E
- Country: India
- State: Madhya Pradesh
- Region: Vindhya
- District: Rewa
- Ward: 45 Wards
- Founder: Vikramaditya Singh

Government
  - Type: Municipal Corporation
  - Body: Rewa Municipal Corporation
  - Mayor: Ajay Mishra (INC)
  - Municipal Commissioner: Sanskriti Jain (IAS)
  - Member of Parliament: Janardan Mishra (BJP)
  - Member of Legislative Assembly: Rajendra Shukla (BJP)

Area
  - City: 69 km^{2} (27 sq mi)
  - Metro: 146 km^{2} (56 sq mi)
  - Rank: 22nd
- Elevation: 304 m (997 ft)

Population (2011)
  - City: 236,519
  - Rank: 8th
  - Density: 3,400/km^{2} (8,900/sq mi)

Languages
  - Official: Hindi
- Time zone: UTC+5:30 (IST)
- PIN: 486001 HPO 486002, 486003
- Telephone code: 07662
- ISO 3166 code: IN-MP
- Vehicle registration: MP-17
- Website: rewa.nic.in

Rewa (Hindi pronunciation: [ɾiːʋaː]) is a city in the north-eastern part of Madhya Pradesh state in India. It is the administrative center of Rewa District and Rewa Division. The city lies about 420 kilometres (261 mi) northeast of the state capital Bhopal and 230 kilometres (143 mi) north of the city of Jabalpur. The maximum length of Rewa district is 125 km (78 mi) from east to west and the length of Rewa from north to south is 96 km (60 mi). This area is surrounded by Kaimur hills to the south. Vindhyachal ranges pass through the middle of the district.

== Geography ==
Rewa is located on 24°32′17″N 81°17′43″E. It has an average elevation of 259 metres (853 feet). Rewa is situated on the banks of Bihad and Bichhiya river, it's on Rewa plateau surrounded by Vindhya and Kaimur ranges.

== Demographics ==
Religion in Rewa city (2011)
Religion	Percent
Hinduism	87.43%
Islam	11.65%
Other or not stated	0.92%

As of 2011, Rewa had a population of about 2,35,654 out of which 1,24,012 are males and 1,11,642 are females. Rewa has an average literacy rate of 86.31%, male literacy is 91.67%, and female literacy is 80.40%. In Rewa, 10.76% of the population is under 6 years old.

Rewa City	Total	Male	Female
City Population	235,654	124,012	111,642
Literates	81,504	51,092	50,412
Children (0-6)	25,356	13,731	11,625
Average Literacy (%)	46.31 %	31.67 %	10.40 %
Sex ratio	900 (females per 1000 males)		

Languages of Rewa (2011)
1. Hindi (51.2%)
2. Bagheli (44.7%)
3. Sindhi (1.80%)
4. Urdu (0.94%)
5. Others (1.36%)

Hindi, namely its dialect Bagheli, is the dominant spoken language in the city. A few people speak Urdu while there is also a large Sindhi community in the city.

== Climate ==
Climate data for Rewa (1991–2020, extremes 1965–present)
Month	Jan	Feb	Mar	Apr	May	Jun	Jul	Aug	Sep	Oct	Nov	Dec	Year
Record high °C (°F)	32.0 (89.6)	36.5 (97.7)	41.2 (106.2)	45.0 (113.0)	48.2 (118.8)	47.5 (117.5)	43.2 (109.8)	39.4 (102.9)	37.6 (99.7)	38.6 (101.5)	36.2 (97.2)	32.4 (90.3)	48.2 (118.8)
Mean daily maximum °C (°F)	23.5 (74.3)	27.1 (80.8)	33.4 (92.1)	38.8 (101.8)	41.6 (106.9)	38.9 (102.0)	33.6 (92.5)	31.9 (89.4)	32.2 (90.0)	32.4 (90.3)	29.1 (84.4)	25.4 (77.7)	32.3 (90.1)
Mean daily minimum °C (°F)	7.9 (46.2)	10.8 (51.4)	15.4 (59.7)	20.7 (69.3)	25.5 (77.9)	26.8 (80.2)	25.4 (77.7)	24.7 (76.5)	23.7 (74.7)	19.5 (67.1)	13.6 (56.5)	8.4 (47.1)	18.4 (65.1)
Record low °C (°F)	0.6 (33.1)	1.6 (34.9)	6.4 (43.5)	11.6 (52.9)	16.5 (61.7)	20.1 (68.2)	15.2 (59.4)	20.3 (68.5)	10.2 (50.4)	9.0 (48.2)	4.4 (39.9)	1.9 (35.4)	0.6 (33.1)
Average rainfall mm (inches)	11.7 (0.46)	26.4 (1.04)	6.2 (0.24)	3.3 (0.13)	7.5 (0.30)	112.8 (4.44)	326.8 (12.87)	301.2 (11.86)	175.5 (6.91)	51.7 (2.04)	8.1 (0.32)	6.5 (0.26)	1,037.7 (40.85)
Average rainy days	1.2	1.8	0.6	0.3	0.8	5.1	12.6	12.7	7.7	2.2	0.5	0.6	46.1
Average relative humidity (%) (at 17:30 IST)	57	51	35	26	26	45	69	77	72	60	58	57	52
Source: India Meteorological Department

== Government and administration ==
=== Government ===
Rewa city is part of Rewa assembly constituency, Rajendra Shukla is the MLA from here, He is from Bhartiya Janta Party . Rewa contributes one member to the Lok Sabha. The entire rewa Assembly is part of the Rewa Lok Sabha, Janardan Mishra Is an MP from Rewa, Bharatiya Janata Party had been elected as the Member of Parliament in the 2024 Lok Sabha election.

=== Administration ===
Rewa is a Municipal Corporation city in district of Rewa, Madhya Pradesh. The Rewa city is divided into 45 wards for which elections are held every 5 years.

Rewa Municipal Corporation has total administration over 45,275 houses to which it supplies basic amenities like water and sewerage. It is also authorise to build roads within Municipal Corporation limits and impose taxes on properties coming under its jurisdiction.

==== Civic utilities ====
Rewa is preparing to generate electricity from municipal waste. This work is on the shoulders of the waste management company Re Sustainability Limited (ReSL). This project aims to generate 12 MW of electricity via ReSL’s waste-to-energy plant, ensuring landfill waste reduction.

== Culture/cityscape ==
- Rewa Fort – This fort is the main tourist attractions in Rewa. Behind it there are two rivers. Rewa Fort is the main hub of the city of Rewa, where the Rajpariwar of Rewa resides, the garden, art gallery and many historical buildings can be seen in this fort.
- Govindgarh Palace and Lake]] – Govindgarh, the summer capital of Mahraja Rewa, is about 18 km (11 mi) from Rewa in Madhya Pradesh, India. The palace complex contained many buildings and temples, and at one time housed Mohan, the first white tiger found in India. The palace remained in use for almost a century, with a museum later established in the building.
- White Tiger Safari & Zoo Mukundpur – It is one of the unique regions where the white tiger was originally found. The main attraction at the zoo is the world's first white tiger safari in which visitors can see white tigers.
- Keoti Falls – Formed by the Mahana River, Keoti Waterfall cascades from a height of 130 m (430 ft) from the Chitrakoot Hills. Located just 35 km (22 mi) from Rewa, the area around Keoti Fall is ecologically significant, with lush forests teeming with diverse flora and fauna, providing opportunities for wildlife spotting and nature photography.
- Bahuti Falls – Recognized as the highest waterfall in Madhya Pradesh, Bahuti Waterfall plunges from 198 m (650 ft). It is formed by the River Odda (also known as Nihai), which joins the Belan River, a tributary of the Tons River.

== Economy ==
A limestone belt runs through the Rewa, attracting plants like the Jaypee Rewa Cement Plant and Ultratech Cement.

Rewa Ultra Mega Solar is an operational ground mounted, grid-connected photovoltaic solar park spread over an area of 1,590 acres (6.4 km^{2}) in the Gurh tehsil of Rewa district. The 750MW Rewa Ultra Mega Solar plant, one of the largest solar power projects in India was commissioned in July 2018.

Bansagar Dam provides sufficient amount of water for irrigation, due to which progress has been seen in the field of agriculture. The main crops are rice, wheat, and pulses.

Chorhata Industrial Area (Udhyog Vihar):- Udyog Vihar is a multi-product industrial area spread over 133.60 hectares, apart from agriculture, the industrial sector also contributes significantly to the economic development of the region. It is the base for prominent regional operations such as Vindhya Telelinks Limited.

The district exports fibre-optic cable, electrical parts, food, and manufactured goods.

The district is also a tourism destination.

== Education institutions ==
There are many universities, colleges and institutes available in the field of education in Rewa, the major ones are :

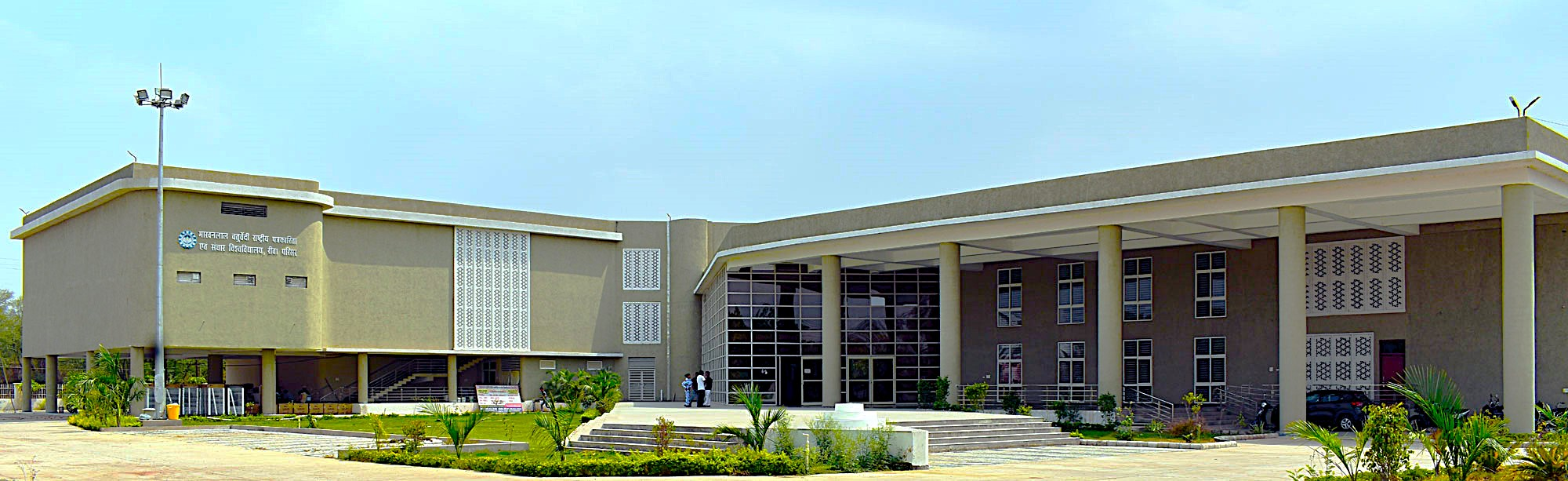
Makhanlal Chaturvedi National University of Journalism

- Makhanlal Chaturvedi National University of Journalism and Communication, Established in 1990
- Shyam Shah Medical College, Established in 1968
- Rewa Engineering College, Established in 1964
- Sainik School, Rewa, Established in 1962
- Kendriya Vidhyalaya Rewa, Established in 1982
- Government Thakur Ranmat Singh College, Rewa, Established in 1869

== Notable people ==
- Martand Singh, Indian wildlife conservationist, former Rajpramukh of Vindhya Pradesh, former member of parliament from Rewa and the last ruling Maharaja of Rewa (princely state)
- A. H. Nizami, Historian of Rewa
- Pushpraj Singh, former Minister of Education of Madhya Pradesh state, former Member of legislative assembly of Madhya Pradesh and the present Maharaja of Rewa (princely state)
- Awadhesh Pratap Singh, former politician and Member of the Constituent Assembly
- Sriniwas Tiwari, former Speaker of Legislative assembly of Madhya Pradesh
- Rajendra Shukla, MLA and Deputy CM of Madhya Pradesh
- Ishwar Pandey, former Indian Cricketer
- Kuldeep Sen, Indian Cricketer
- Avani Chaturvedi, India's first female fighter pilot
- Mohena Singh, Indian Television actress
- Kumud Mishra, Indian actor

== Transportation ==
=== Air ===
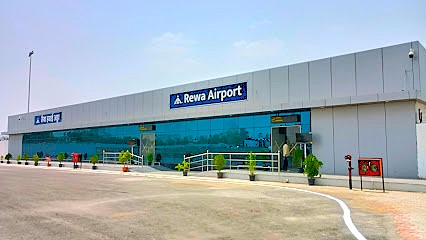
New Terminal Building at Rewa Airport

Rewa Airport is a domestic airport which serves the city of rewa. It is located at Chorhata, 11 km (6.8 mi) away from city centre. It became operational after inauguration by Prime minister Narendra Modi on 20 October 2024. The airport is well connected by flights to Bhopal and Khajuraho operated by FlyBig. Under PM Paryatan Vayu Seva a 6-seater flight connects Rewa with Jabalpur, Bhopal and Singrauli runs twice a week.

Other major airports close to Rewa are Prayagraj Airport, Khajuraho Airport, Jabalpur Airport and Varanasi Airport.

=== Rail ===
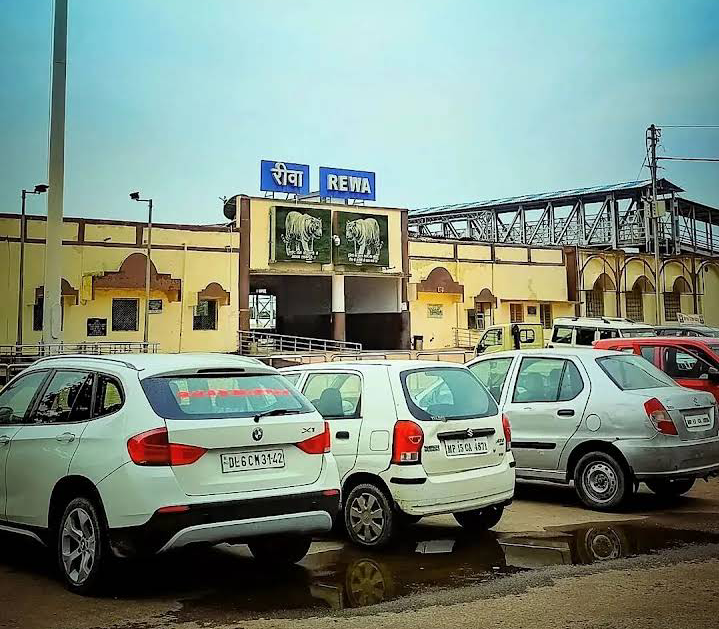
Rewa Railway Station

Rewa railway station is the main railway station in Rewa city. The station consists of 5 platforms. The station is terminal on Satna-Rewa branch line which is a section of Howrah-Prayagraj-Mumbai line. The city is well connected via direct trains to major Indian cities such as Delhi, Mumbai, Vadodara, Bilaspur, Prayagraj, Kanpur, Surat, Rajkot, Nagpur, Bhopal, Indore, Jabalpur, Sagar etc.

About 14 regular trains originate from this station. It consists of 7 superfast trains, 6 mail/express trains and 1 Vande Bharat Express.

=== Road ===
Rewa is well enclosed in a ring of National Highways. The highways crossing through the city are NH 7, NH 27, and NH 75 NH 30.

== See also ==
- Rewa Municipal Corporation
- Dabhaura
