= Girish Gautam =

Former Speaker of the Madhya Pradesh Legislative Assembly

Speaker of the Madhya Pradesh Legislative Assembly
- In office 22 February 2021 - 3 February 2023
- Preceded by: N. P. Prajapati
- Succeeded by: Narendra Singh Tomar

Member of Madhya Pradesh Legislative Assembly
- Incumbent
- Assumed office 2008
- Preceded by: Panchu Lal Prajapati
- Constituency: Deotalab
- In office 2003–2008
- Preceded by: Sriniwas Tiwari
- Succeeded by: Panna Bai Prajapati
- Constituency: Mangawan

Personal details
- Born: 28 March 1953 (age 73) Karaundi, Vindhya Pradesh (now in Madhya Pradesh), India
- Party: Bharatiya Janata Party
- Spouse: Lalita Gautam
- Children: 1 son(Rahul Gautam), 2 daughters(Rajani Gautam, Ruchi Gautam )
- Education: B.Sc, LL.B

Girish Gautam is an Indian politician and Member of Madhya Pradesh Legislative Assembly from Deotalab Assembly constituency who is served as Speaker of Madhya Pradesh Legislative Assembly.

== Personal life ==
He was born on 28 March 1953 in Rewa, Madhya Pradesh.
