= Abhay Mishra =

Indian politician (born 1967)

Neelam Abhay Mishra (born 1967) is an Indian politician from Madhya Pradesh. He is a three time MLA from Semariya Assembly constituency in Rewa District. He won the 2023 Madhya Pradesh Legislative Assembly election, representing the Indian National Congress.

== Early life and education ==
Mishra is from Semaria, Rewa District, Madhya Pradesh. He is the son of Brijkishore Mishra. He completed his B.A. at a college affiliated with Awadhesh Pratap Singh University, Rewa, Madhya Pradesh.

== Career ==
Mishra won from Semariya Assembly constituency in the 2023 Madhya Pradesh Legislative Assembly election representing the Indian National Congress. He polled 56,024 votes and defeated his nearest rival, K. P. Tripathi of the Bharatiya Janata Party, by a margin of 637 votes. He first became an MLA winning the 2008 Madhya Pradesh Legislative Assembly election on the Bharatiya Janata Party ticket from Semariya Assembly constituency defeating Lalmani Pandy of BSP by a margin of 5,783 votes. Later, he retained the seat for BJP in the 2013 Assembly election. He won for the third time in the 2023 election. In between, he contested from Rewa Lok Sabha constituency on Congress ticket and lost the 2024 Indian general election in Madhya Pradesh. He lost to Janardan Mishra of the BJP by a margin of 193,374 votes.
