= Sainik School, Rewa =

Coordinates: 24°33′10.95″N 81°17′49.66″E

- Rewa, Madhya Pradesh; India

Information
- Type: Public, Boarding
- Mottoes: Knowledge is Power
- Established: 20 July 1962; 64 years ago
- Founder: Lt. Gen. R. R. Narang
- Principal: Col. Avinash Rawal
- Headmaster: Squadron Leader C. H. Thrilok Kumar
- Grades: 6th to 12th
- Gender: Coeducational
- Campus size: 274-acre (1.11 km^{2})
- Affiliation: CBSE
- Alumni: Sainwinians
- Website: sainikschoolrewa.ac.in

Sainik School Rewa is one of the 33 Sainik Schools of India. It is a purely residential school. The medium of instruction is English. Established by Government of India on 20 July 1962 at the sprawling estate known as Yuvraj Bhawan along with the land donated by HH Samrajya Maharajadhiraja Bandhresh Shri Maharaja Martand Singh Ju Deo Bahadur, Maharaja of erstwhile princely state of Rewa, the school prepares boys to join the indian armed forces. The school has contributed about 950 officers. It is affiliated to Central Board of Secondary Education and is a member of Indian Public Schools Conference (IPSC).

The school prepares boys for entry into the National Defence Academy, Khadakwasla, Pune and Indian Naval Academy (INA).

== Administration ==
The administration of Sainik School is vested in an autonomous body known as Sainik Schools Society under Ministry of Defence, India. Sainik Schools Society is headed by the Board of Governors under the Chairmanship of Raksha Mantri. The Chief Ministers/Education Ministers of the states where the Sainik Schools are located, are members of the Board of Governors. There is a Local Board of Administration for each school with a senior defence service officer as its Chairman. The Air Officer Commanding-in-Chief, Central Air Command, Allahabad is the Chairman of the Board for Sainik School Rewa. The Principal is the administrative and academic head of the institute. He is assisted by two other service officers viz. Vice Principal and Administrative Officer. The service officers are specially selected and are on deputation from Ministry of Defence.

== Campus ==
Sainik School Rewa is located in Rewa, in the Indian state Madhya Pradesh. The campus spreads across 274 acres (1.11 km^{2}) of land. The climate of Rewa is dry in summer and quite cold in winters. Rewa is located on the Varanasi–Kanyakumari highway (NH 7) at a distance of 550 km from Bhopal, 235 km from Jabalpur and 578 km from Raipur. It is accessible by road and rail. The school is 2 km from Rewa Bus Stand and 6 km away from Rewa Railway Station. Direct trains are available from Bhopal, Jabalpur, Allahabad and New Delhi.

=== Main building ===
The main building houses the administrative offices including the office of the Principal, vice Principal, Administrative Officer, Senior Master and Quarter Master of the school. It has class-rooms for all the students from class VI to XII, an IT centre with fifty computers, Laboratories (Physics, Chemistry, Biology and Languages), Auditorium, Library, Staff Room, Art Room, Audio-Visual Room, Wood, Metal and Electrical Workshop, NCC Office and Armoury, Emergency Care Room.

=== Hostel Blocks ===
The school is fully residential. All cadets are accommodated in Dormitories/Hostels (referred as Houses) under direct supervision of Housemasters who act as their guides and guardians. The housemasters are assisted in their job by attached housemaster and Matron/Hostel Superintendents who take care of cadets' personal hygiene and comforts. At present the school has five senior and five junior Houses. Earlier there were three junior Houses that were named after the characters of Hindu Mythology namely Abhimanyu, Bharat, and Luv-Kush. Later two more houses, namely Dhruv and Eklavya were added.

Senior Houses are named after important rivers and mountain ranges of Madhya Pradesh. The hostels have study room, recreation area, colour TV sets, table tennis rooms etc.

House Colours and Emblems
House	Colour	Symbol	Origin of Name
Senior Houses (9th to 12th)
Betwa	Orange	Rhino	Betwa River
Chambal	Black	Bison	Chambal River
Narmada	Royal Blue	Lion	Narmada River
Satpura	Red	Elephant	Satpura Mountain Range
Vindhya	Yellow	White Tiger	Vindhya Mountain Range
Junior Houses (6th to 8th)
Junior Betwa	Orange	Rhino	Betwa River
Junior Chambal	Green	Bison	Chambal River
Junior Narmada	Royal Blue	Lion	Narmada River
Junior Satpura	Red	Elephant	Satpura Mountain Range
Junior Vindhya	Yellow	White Tiger	Vindhya Mountain Range

=== Cadets Mess ===
The campus has a central cadets' mess which caters for members in one sitting. Both vegetarian and non-vegetarian food is served as per choice of the cadets.

=== Athletic Field ===
The campus has many playgrounds for different games. Campus has basketball courts, volleyball courts, hockey ground, tennis court, skating rink, swimming pool, horse riding facilities and football fields. It also has one athletic field where annual athletic events are conducted, the field has 400 meter track for racing and other track events, it also has pole vault, high jump, long jump, hammer throw, short-put and triple jump fields. There are three permanent helipads in athletic field.

== N.C.C. ==
N.C.C. is an integral part of students' life in Sainik Schools. The School has an Independent Company of Junior and Senior Division. N.C.C. unit of school comprises all the three wings of NCC i.e. the Army, Naval and Air.

== Sports and Games ==
Morning P.T. and evening games are compulsory for all cadets. The School has facilities for Volleyball, Basketball, Football, Badminton, Hockey and Tennis. The school has a gym. Coaching is provided by qualified instructors from the defence services for the games and physical training. Indoor games like TT, Chess and Carrom are also available. The School has an obstacle course to test and improve students' courage, physical endurance and physique. P.T. is compulsory and all students are to take part in regular physical training, including cross country runs. Centralised mountaineering and trekking courses and camps are also conducted by the Sainik Schools Society.

== Notable alumni ==
Alumni of the Sainik School Rewa or SSR are known as Sainwinian. The school counts numerous politicians, bureaucrats, doctors, engineers, journalists, entrepreneurs, business leaders and a legion of military leaders as its alumni.

- Admiral Dinesh K Tripathi, PVSM, AVSM, NM, ADC - Chief of the Naval Staff
- General Upendra Dwivedi, PVSM, AVSM, ADC - Chief of the Army Staff
- Satyavrat Chaturvedi and Sundar Lal Tiwari both active politicians are alumni of SSR.
- Lieutenant General K. T. Parnaik, PVSM, UYSM, YSM (Retd) - Governor of Arunachal Pradesh
- Lieutenant General A. K. Singh, PVSM, AVSM, SM, VSM, ADC (Retd) - Lieutenant Governor of the Andaman and Nicobar Islands (Retd).
- Lieutenant General Munish Sibal, PVSM, AVSM** (Retd)
- Lieutenant General DS Chauhan, PVSM, AVSM (Retd)
- Major General MP Singh (Retd)
- Air Vice Marshal Navin Verma, AVSM (Retd)
- Air Vice Marshal AK Tiwari (Retd)
- Air Marshal PK Roy, PVSM, AVSM, VM, VSM, ADC (Retd)
- Lieutenant General Sandeep Singh, AVSM*, SM, VSM
- Lieutenant General AT Parnaik, SM, VSM
- Major General NP Gadkari
- Major General PN Tripathi, VSM
- Vice Admiral Dinesh Prabhakar, NM, VSM
- Major General VP Chaturvedi
- Rear Admiral Rakesh Pandit, NM
- Vice Admiral Atul Kumar Jain, PVSM, AVSM, VSM

The school alumni have received 3 Vir Chakra, 3 Shaurya Chakra, 4 Sena Medal (Gallantry) and numerous distinguish service medals.
