= Divyaraj Singh =

Indian politician

Member of Madhya Pradesh Legislative Assembly
- Incumbent
- Assumed office 2013
- Preceded by: Rajkumar Urmaliya
- Constituency: Sirmour

Personal details
- Party: Bharatiya Janata Party
- Profession: Politician

Divyaraj Singh is an Indian politician from Madhya Pradesh. He is a three time elected Member of the Madhya Pradesh Legislative Assembly from 2013, 2018, and 2023, representing Sirmour Assembly constituency as a Member of the Bharatiya Janata Party. He is the grandson of His Highness Samrajya Maharajadhiraja Bandhresh Shri Maharaja Martand Singh Ju Deo Bahadur, the last ruling Maharaja of Rewa (princely state).

== Political career ==
In the 2013 Madhya Pradesh Legislative Assembly elections, Singh contested from the Sirmour Assembly constituency as a candidate of the Bharatiya Janata Party. He ran against Indian National Congress candidate Aruna Vivek Tiwari and won the election with a narrow margin of 5,288 votes, securing a total of 40,018 votes, while Tiwari received 34,730 votes.

In the 2018 Madhya Pradesh Legislative Assembly elections, Singh was again nominated by the BJP for the same constituency and once more faced off against INC's Tiwari. This time, Singh won with a larger margin of 13,401 votes, receiving a total of 49,443 votes compared to Tiwari's 36,042 votes.

In the 2023 Madhya Pradesh Legislative Assembly elections, Singh again contested from the Sirmour constituency on a BJP ticket. He faced candidates from both the Bahujan Samaj Party's candidate V. D. Pandey and INC's candidate Ramgarib Vanvasi. Singh won the election with a margin of 13,790 votes, receiving a total of 54,875 votes. Pandey, the BSP candidate, secured 41,085 votes, while Vanvasi of the INC obtained 35,560 votes.

== See also ==
- List of chief ministers of Madhya Pradesh
- Madhya Pradesh Legislative Assembly
