= Pushpraj Singh =

Indian politician

Pushparaj Singh

Member of Madhya Pradesh Legislative Assembly
- In office 1990–2003
- Preceded by: Prem Lal Mishra
- Succeeded by: Rajendra Shukla
- Constituency: Rewa

Minister of Education, Madhya Pradesh Government
- In office 1993–1998

Personal details
- Born: 3 July 1960 (age 66)
- Party: Bhartiya Janta Party
- Other political affiliations: Indian National Congress; Independent
- Children: Mohena Singh, Divyaraj Singh
- Parent(s): Maharaja Martand Singh, Maharani Pravin Kumari
- Profession: Politician

Pushpraj Singh or is the present "Descendent of Baghel dynasty" of Rewa and he is the son of His Highness Samrajya Maharajadhiraja Bandhresh Shri Maharaja Martand Singh Ju Deo Bahadur, the last ruling Maharaja of Rewa (princely state) and he is a former minister of education of Madhya Pradesh state in the Digvijaya Singh government. His daughter Mohena Singh is Indian television actress and son Divyaraj Singh is BJP legislator from Sirmour, Rewa.

Pushparaj Singh is the son of Martand Singh, who was the last rulling Maharaja of rewa.

== Early life ==
Pushpraj Singh was born on 3 July 1960 in Madhya Pradesh, India. After his father's death in 1995, he retained the title of Maharaja of Rewa (princely state). His mother's name is Maharani Pravin Kumari who was the princess of Cutch State (also spelled Kutch). Pushpraj Singh spouse's name is Madhu Singh and the couple has one son and daughter.

== Political career ==
Pushparaj Singh debuted in politics by contesting assembly elections as INC candidate in 1990 from Rewa constituency. He won this election by a margin of 27,546 against incumbent Premlal Mishra. He continued with his victory campaign in 1993 and 1998 elections until he was defeated by BJP candidate Rajendra Shukla in 2003.
