= Nagendra Singh (disambiguation) =

Nagendra Singh was the president of the International Court of Justice.

Nagendra Singh may also refer to:

- Nagendra Singh (Gurh politician) (born 1942)
- Nagendra Singh (politician, born 1943) (from Nagod)
- Nagendra Singh Yadav, Indian politician
