= Sundar Lal Tiwari =

Indian politician (1957–2019)

Member of the Madhya Pradesh Legislative Assembly
- In office 2013 – 2018
- Preceded by: Nagendra Singh
- Succeeded by: Nagendra Singh
- Constituency: Gurh

Member of Parliament, Lok Sabha
- In office 1999 – 2004
- Preceded by: Chandramani Tripathi
- Succeeded by: Chandramani Tripathi
- Constituency: Rewa

Personal details
- Born: 13 December 1957 Teoni, Madhya Pradesh, India
- Died: 11 March 2019 (aged 61) Rewa, Madhya Pradesh, India
- Party: Indian National Congress (1989-2019)
- Spouse: Rashmi Tiwari
- Children: Siddharth Tiwari
- Parent: Sriniwas Tiwari (father)
- Education: LLB
- Source: ["Biography:Tiwari, Sunder Lal" (PDF). Madhya Pradesh Legislative Assembly.]

Sundar Lal Tiwari (13 December 1957 – 11 March 2019) was an Indian politician and a member of the Indian National Congress party.

== Political career ==
Sundar Lal Tiwari became an MP in Lok Sabha from Rewa in 1999. He was elected as an MLA of the Madhya Pradesh Legislative Assembly in 2013.

Unlike other members of parliament from Rewa, taking the legacy of his Father Sriniwas Tiwari, Sunderlal Tiwari not just focussed on his parliamentary area but focussed on the development of Whole Vindhya region. Specific areas also include Hanumangarh, area in Sidhi District. Sunderlal did several political programmes in HanumanGarh and Sidhi with Help of Dwarika Prasad Dubey (a national celebrated politician and associate of Sriniwas Tiwari).

== Personal life ==
Sundar Lal Tiwari was the son of Sriniwas Tiwari, a prominent Congress politician from Madhya Pradesh. He was married to Rashmi Tiwari, and they had a son and a daughter. His son Siddharth Tiwari is also an Indian politician.

== See also ==
- Madhya Pradesh Legislative Assembly
- 2013 Madhya Pradesh Legislative Assembly election
