= Sriniwas Tiwari =

Indian politician

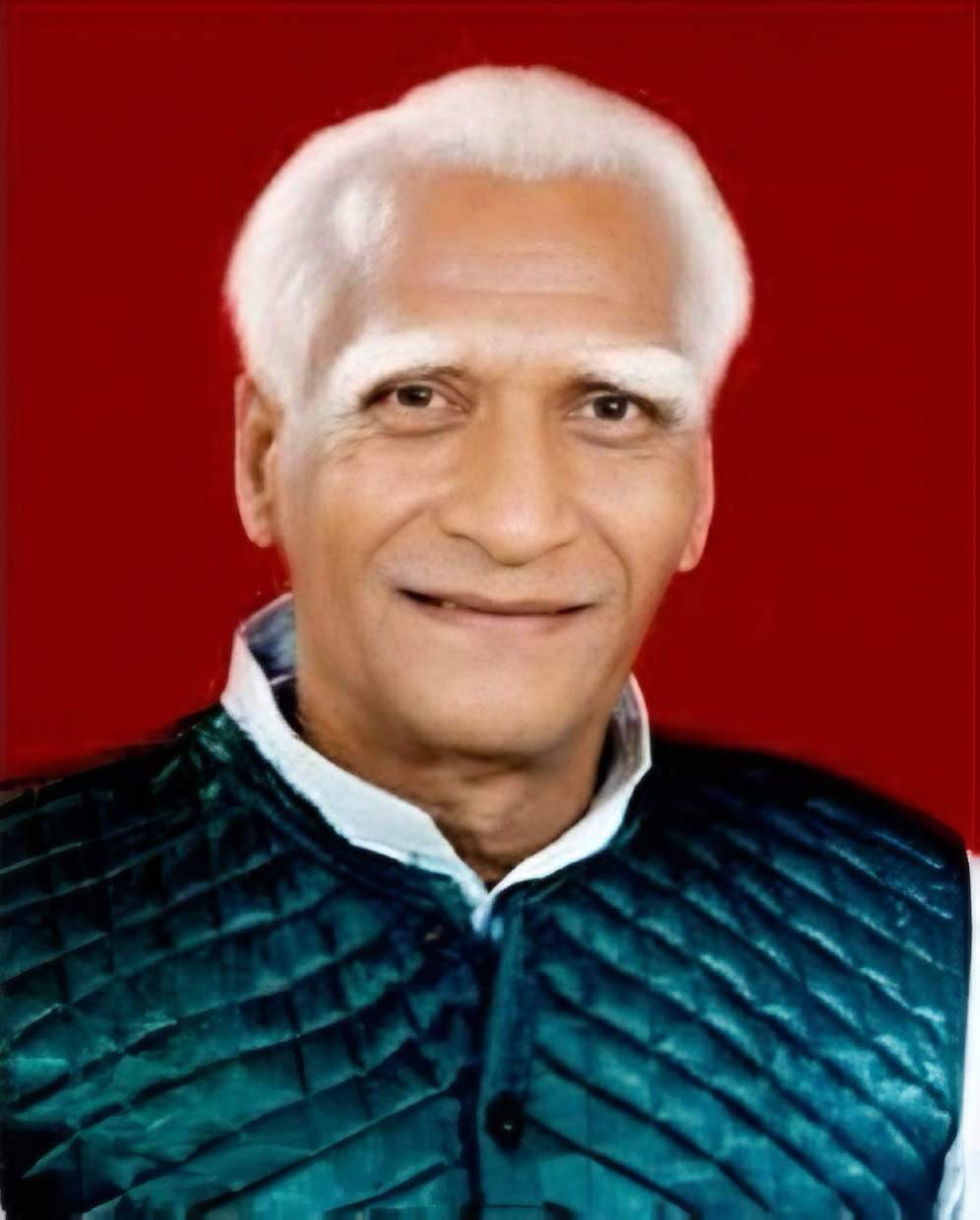

Member of Madhya Pradesh Legislative Assembly
- In office 1990 – 2003
- Preceded by: Champa Devi
- Succeeded by: Girish Gautam
- Constituency: Mangawan
- In office 1977 – 1985
- Preceded by: Triveni Prasad
- Succeeded by: Garud Kumar
- Constituency: Teonthar
- In office 1972 – 1977
- Preceded by: Rukmini Raman Pratap Singh
- Succeeded by: Rukmini Raman Pratap Singh
- Constituency: Mangawan

Member of Vindhya Pradesh Legislative Assembly
- In office 1952 – 1956
- Preceded by: Constituency established
- Succeeded by: Constituency dissolved
- Constituency: Mangawan

Personal details
- Born: 17 September 1926 Shahpur, Rewa State, British India
- Died: 19 January 2018 (aged 91) New Delhi, India
- Party: Socialist Party (1948-1964, 1972-1973); Samyukta Socialist Party (1964-1972); Indian National Congress (1973-2018)
- Spouse: Shravan Kumari
- Children: Arun Tiwari; Sundar Lal Tiwari
- Parents: Mangaldeen Tiwari (father); Kaushalya Devi (mother)
- Education: Durbar College, Rewa
- Nickname(s): White Tiger

Shriyut Sriniwas Tiwari (17 September 1926 – 19 January 2018) was a politician from Rewa, Madhya Pradesh, India. He had a long career in Madhya Pradesh state politics. He was a six-time member of the Madhya Pradesh Legislative Assembly. For most of his political career, he was a member of the Indian National Congress, and had stints in Socialist Party and Samyukta Socialist Party in his younger days. He was Madhya Pradesh assembly speaker from 1993 to 2003.

He also was a member of the Vindhya Pradesh Legislative Assembly between 1952 and 1956, before it was merged into Madhya Pradesh. He was bitterly opposed to the merger and advocated the separation of the Vindhya Pradesh region from Madhya Pradesh during his political career. He was known as the White Tiger of Madhya Pradesh. He is considered an influential politician in Madhya Pradesh and is often identified with the political group led by Narayan Prasad Shukla during a significant phase of state politics.

His political associate of Sidhi, Dwarika Prasad Dubey (Nausa) taking his legacy forward in Sidhi District of Vindhy held several veteran governmental and State to Semi National organizational positions in Congress Party. Dubey also was an MLA candidate from GopadBanas and his victory of Jila Panchayat in 2009 is considered as one of the biggest Panchayati Raj Victories of India.

He lost the election from Sirmour in the 2008 Madhya Pradesh Legislative Assembly election.

== Personal life ==
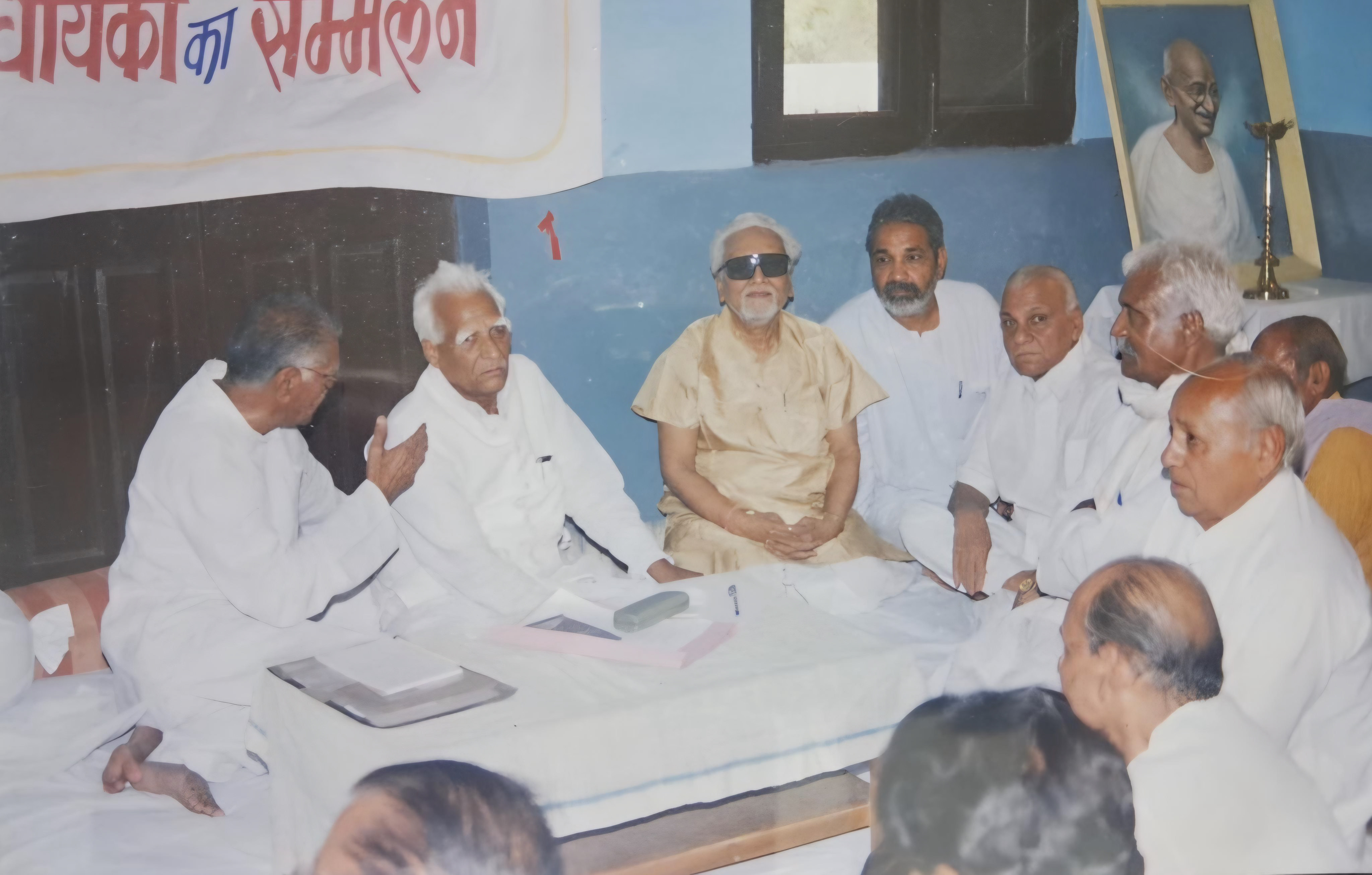
Sriniwas Tiwari with Narayan Prasad Shukla and other former Members of the Legislative Assembly.

Sriniwas Tiwari was born on 17 September 1926 in Shahpur, a village in the Rewa princely state, to Mangaldeen Tiwari and Kaushalya Devi. He was a native of Tiuni, a village in Rewa district. Tiwari was a freedom fighter and a lawyer who graduated with a Master of Arts degree in Hindi and an LL.B. from Durbar College, Rewa.

On 21 May 1937, he married Shravan Kumari, the daughter of Ramniranjan Mishra of Jhiria village in Satna district. He had two sons, Arun Tiwari and Sundar Lal Tiwari. Sundar Lal Tiwari was also an Indian National Congress politician who served as MP and MLA in the Madhya Pradesh Legislative Assembly. His P.A. was Ramesh Tiwari.

Tiwari died on 19 January 2018, aged 91.
