= Shiv Dutt Upadhyaya =

Indian politician

Shiv Dutt Upadhyaya was born in Dwarahat district of Almora in Uttarakhand, India. He joined Pandit Motilal Nehru as his personal secretary in 1923. After the death of Pandit Motilal Nehru, he was retained by Pandit Jawaharlal Nehru, with whom he remained associated till the latter's death. Upadhyaya was elected to the Lok Sabha from the Satna constituency in the erstwhile Vindhya Pradesh in 1952. He was re-elected to Lok Sabha in 1957 and 1962 from Rewa in Madhya Pradesh. In 1967 he was elected unopposed to the Rajya Sabha.

He was awarded the Padmasri in 1983.

He remained closely associated with the Nehru-Gandhi family from 1923 until his death in 1984 and finds mention in Jawaharlal Nehru's last will & testament.
