= Mohena Singh =

Indian actress, dancer, choreographer and YouTuber

Mohena Kumari Singh
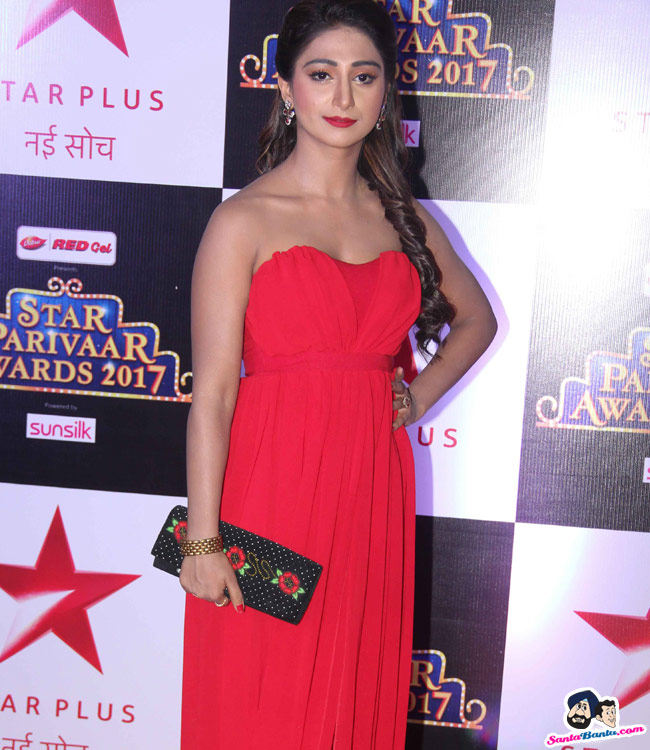
- Mohena Singh at the Star Parivaar Awards 2017
- Born: Mohena Kumari Singh
- Other names: Mohena Singh, Mo
- Education: University of Mumbai
- Occupation: Choreographer • Dancer • Youtuber • Former Actress
- Years active: 2011–2019
- Known for: Dance India Dance; Yeh Rishta Kya Kehlata Hai
- Spouse: Suyesh Rawat (m. 2019)
- Children: 2
- Father: Pushpraj Singh
- Relatives: Martand Singh (grandfather); Satpal Maharaj (father-in-law)

Mohena Singh, also known as Mohena Kumari Singh, is an Indian dancer, choreographer, YouTuber and former television actress and a member of the royal family of Rewa. She is known for playing the role of Keerti Goenka Singhania in Star Plus's Yeh Rishta Kya Kehlata Hai.

== Personal life ==
Mohena Kumari Singh is the princess of Rewa; she belongs to the royal family of Rewa and she is the granddaughter of His Highness Samrajya Maharajadhiraja Bandhresh Shri Maharaja Martand Singh Ju Deo Bahadur, the last ruling Maharaja of Rewa (princely state). On 14 October 2019, she married Suyesh Rawat, who is the son of Uttarakhand Cabinet Minister Satpal Maharaj. The couple welcomed a baby boy on 15 April 2022 and a baby girl on 2 April 2024.

== Career ==
Her first television appearance was on Dance India Dance in 2012, after which she was Remo D'Souza's assistant choreographer on various projects like ‘Student Of The Year’, Dedh Ishquiya, and Yeh Jawani Hai Deewani. She started her acting career as Sara in Dil Dostii Dance (2015). She also worked as a choreographer in many seasons of the celebrity dance reality show, Jhalak Dikhhla Jaa. She appeared in the serial Yeh Rishta Kya Kehlata Hai and was also seen in Silsila Pyaar Ka on Star Plus (2016). On Dance India Dance, she finished in fifth place overall. She also was a part of the YouTube channel, 'Rimorav Vlogs' along with her Yeh Rishta Kya Kehlata Hai co-stars Rishi Dev and Gaurav Wadhwa, which got more than 2 million subscribers in less than 2 years. Following a split with them in September 2019, she started her own YouTube channel 'MOHENA VLOGS'.

== Filmography ==
=== Television ===
Year	Title	Role	Notes	Ref.
2011-2012	Dance India Dance (Season 3)	Contestant	4th runner-up	
2013	Qubool Hai	Herself	Special appearance	
2015	Dil Dostii Dance	Sara		
2015	Pyaar Tune Kya Kiya	Jhanvi	Season 5	
2015-2016	Twist Wala Love - Fairy Tales Remixed	Natasha	Special appearance	
2015-2016	Gumrah: End of Innocence	ASP Sumedha	Season 5	
2012-2015	Jhalak Dikhhla Jaa	Choreographer	Seasons 5–8	
2016	Silsila Pyaar Ka	Aarati Singh	Cameo	
2012-2019	Fear Files	Ranjhana		
2014-2016	Naya Akbar Birbal	Rajkumari Roopali		
2016–2019	Yeh Rishta Kya Kehlata Hai	Keerti Goenka Singhania	Lead role	
2017	Ishqbaaaz	Keerti Goenka Singhania	Guest Appearance	
2019	Kitchen Champion	Contestant		

=== Films ===
Year	Title	Role	Notes
2013	ABCD	Dancer	Song: "Man Basiyo Sawariyo"

=== Music videos ===
- Tumhari Aarzoo by Mohit Chauhan
- Gucci Volt Tum by Gippy Grewal

== Awards and nominations ==
Year	Award	Category	Show	Result
2019	Indian Telly Award	Best Actress in a Supporting Role	Yeh Rishta Kya Kehlata Hai	Won
