= Narendra Prajapati =

Indian politician

Member of Madhya Pradesh Legislative Assembly
- Incumbent
- Assumed office 2023
- Preceded by: Panchu Lal Prajapati
- Constituency: Mangawan

Personal details
- Political party: Bharatiya Janata Party
- Profession: Politician

Narendra Prajapati is an Indian politician from Madhya Pradesh. He is a Member of the Madhya Pradesh Legislative Assembly from 2023, representing Mangawan Assembly constituency as a Member of the Bharatiya Janata Party.

== Political career ==
In the 2023 Madhya Pradesh Legislative Assembly elections, Prajapati was nominated by the Bharatiya Janata Party to contest the Mangawan Assembly constituency. He ran against Indian National Congress candidate Babita Saket and won the election with a margin of 31,912 votes. Prajapati received a total of 78,754 votes, while Babita Saket secured 46,842 votes.

== Controversies ==
On 23 November 2024 after the arrest of Mauganj MLA Pradeep Patel for attempting to demolish an illegal encroachment near Mahadevan Mandir in Devra Mauganj, Narendra Prajapati while speaking to the press in his support said that "Only those who say Jai Shree Ram will stay in India."

== See also ==
- List of chief ministers of Madhya Pradesh
- Madhya Pradesh Legislative Assembly
