= Mukundpur =

Coordinates: 24.427°N 81.248°E

Mukundpur is a village in Amarpatan tehsil, Maihar district, Madhya Pradesh State, India.

The first white tiger was spotted by Rewa Maharaja (King) Martand Singh in 1951 in this region. To commemorate this, the World's First White Tiger Safari Maharaja Martan Singh Judeo White Tiger Safari And Zoo was inaugurated on 3 April 2016 in the Jungles of Mukundpur.
