= Nagendra Singh (Gurh politician) =

Indian politician (born 1942)

Nagendra Singh (born 1942) is an Indian politician from Madhya Pradesh. He is a five time MLA from Gurh Assembly constituency in Rewa District. He won the 2023 Madhya Pradesh Legislative Assembly election, representing Bharatiya Janata Party.

== Early life and education ==
Singh is from Rewa, Madhya Pradesh. He late father, Yadunath Singh, was a farmer. He completed his L.L.B. in 1967 at B.A. in 1964 at T.R.S College, Rewa, which is affiliated with Dr. Hari Singh Gour University.

== Career ==
Singh won from Gurh Assembly constituency representing Bharatiya Janata Party in the 2023 Madhya Pradesh Legislative Assembly election. He polled 68,715 votes and defeated his nearest rival, Kapidhwaj Singh of the Indian National Congress, by a margin of 2,493 votes. He started his political career with the Indian National Congress and first became an MLA winning the 1985 Madhya Pradesh Legislative Assembly election. Later, after a break of four terms, he won the 2003 Madhya Pradesh Legislative Assembly election representing the BJP, and retained the seat in the 2008 Madhya Pradesh Legislative Assembly election. Then, he lost the 2013 Assembly election to Sunder Lal Tiwari of the Indian National Congress. However, he regained the seat for the BJP, winning the 2018 Madhya Pradesh Legislative Assembly election and won for a fifth term in the 2023 Assembly election.
