= Rajmani Patel =

Indian politician

Member of Parliament, Rajya Sabha
- In office 3 April 2018 – 3 April 2024
- Preceded by: Satyavrat Chaturvedi, INC
- Constituency: Madhya Pradesh

Member of the Madhya Pradesh Legislative Assembly
- In office 1998–2003
- Preceded by: Ramlakhan Sharma
- Succeeded by: Ramlakhan Sharma
- Constituency: Sirmour
- In office 1980–1990
- Preceded by: Sita Prasad Sharma
- Succeeded by: Ramlakhan Sharma
- In office 1972–1977
- Preceded by: Jamuna Prasad
- Succeeded by: Sita Prasad Sharma

Personal details
- Born: 20 July 1945 (age 80) Baraoun(बरौ) Village, Semariya, Rewa district
- Party: Indian National Congress
- Children: 2 Sons
- Parent: Jamuna Prasad Patel (father)
- Education: LLB
- Alma mater: APS University, Rewa
- Profession: Activist, politician
- Website: http://rajmanipatel.in
- As of 17 June, 2018 Source: ["Affidavit:Patel, Rajmani" (PDF). Vidhan Sabha, Madhya Pradesh Legislative Assembly.]

Rajmani Patel is an Indian politician from the Indian National Congress who was elected to the Rajya Sabha from Madhya Pradesh on 15 March 2018.

== Early life ==
Born in a village called Barron (Bairon) in Rewa district of Madhya Pradesh to Jamuna Prasad Patel.

== Career ==
He was the treasurer of Advocates Association in 1965. He worked against feudalism and subsequently went to jail.

== Politics ==
Very active during 1978–79 in Congress agitations, he was first elected to the Madhya Pradesh Legislative Assembly in the year 1972 from Sirmour and subsequently in 1980, 1985 and 1998.

He also served as Working President of MP Congress.
