= A. H. Nizami =

Indian historian, scholar, and academician (1911–2005)

Professor Akhtar Hussain Nizami
- Born: 1 December 1911; Rewa, Rewa State, British India (now in Madhya Pradesh, India)
- Died: 16 December 2005 (aged 94); Rewa, Madhya Pradesh, India
- Occupations: Historian, professor, college principal, archivist

Academic background
- Education: Aligarh Muslim University (B.A., M.A.); Agra University (LL.B.)

Academic work
- Era: 20th–21st century
- Discipline: Medieval Indian history, Baghelkhand regional history, Persian historiography
- Institutions: Aligarh Muslim University; Thakur Ranmat Singh College, Rewa(Darbar College, Rewa); Government College, Sidhi; Government Post Graduate College, Guna; Government College, Betul; Indian Council of Historical Research
- Notable works: Catalogue of Persian Manuscripts and Records in the Shri Raghubir Library, Sitamau, Survey of Kheechi Chauhan History, Ajeet Fateh Nayak Raysa: Baghelkhand Ka Alha

Akhtar Hussain Nizami (also spelt Akhtar Husain Nizami or Prof. A. H. Nizami; 1 December 1911 – 16 December 2005) was an Indian historian, linguist, archivist, and academician. An authority on medieval Indian history and the regional history of Baghelkhand, Bundelkhand, Malwa, and Rajputana, he served for over three decades in the Madhya Pradesh Education Service as a professor of history and principal of various government postgraduate colleges.

Proficient in Urdu, Hindi, Persian, English, and Arabic, Nizami was widely recognized for his translations and cataloguing of medieval Persian manuscripts, his pioneering archival work on the Baghela dynasty of Rewa, and his long-standing contributions to the Indian Historical Records Commission and the Indian History Congress.

== Early life and education ==
Akhtar Hussain Nizami was born on 1 December 1911 in Rewa, the capital of the princely state of Rewa in the Baghelkhand Agency, to Hifzul Kareem.

He completed his high school examination under the Allahabad Board in 1927. In October 1927, he enrolled at Aligarh Muslim University (AMU), residing at Nasrullah Hostel. He passed his Intermediate examination in 1929 and graduated first-class with a Bachelor of Arts (B.A.) degree in English literature in 1931, receiving the University Gold Medal for academic excellence. He subsequently earned his Master of Arts (M.A.) in History from AMU in April 1934. During his student years at Aligarh, he was a member of the Qirat Class and served as the Secretary of the Sultania Historical Society (1931–1932).

Later in his career, he earned a Bachelor of Laws (LL.B.) degree from Agra University in 1948, and pursued doctoral (Ph.D.) research at Aligarh Muslim University between 1951 and 1954. Alongside his expertise in Islamic historiography and Persian chronicles, he conducted extensive studies of Hindu and Jain religious texts.

== Academic and administrative career ==
Nizami began his teaching career as a Junior Lecturer in the Department of History at Aligarh Muslim University between 1934 and 1939. In 1935, Maharaja Gulab Singh of Rewa invited him back to his hometown and appointed him as a lecturer in history at Darbar College, Rewa (now Government Thakur Ranmat Singh College, Rewa).

He taught history in Rewa from 1935 to 1963, mentoring generations of students and scholars in the Vindhya region. Serving in the Madhya Pradesh Education Service, he was promoted to the post of Principal and headed three government colleges prior to his retirement:

- Principal, Government College, Sidhi: 1963–1964
- Principal, Government Post Graduate College, Guna: 1964–1965
- Principal, Government College, Betul: 1966–1967

He retired from government service in 1967, settling at Mohalla Raniganj Marg in Rewa. Between 1960 and 1968, he served on various academic committees for Saugar University and Jiwaji University, Gwalior, and guided Ph.D. scholars across the universities of Agra, Sagar, Gwalior, Jhansi, Rewa, and Jabalpur. From 1982 to 1984, he was a Research Fellow of the Indian Council of Historical Research (ICHR), New Delhi, affiliated through Aligarh Muslim University.

== Historical research and institutional roles ==
Nizami played a key role in unearthing, preserving, and cataloguing primary historical records in central India, particularly concerning the Baghela dynasty, the Malwa Sultanate, and the Indian Rebellion of 1857 in Baghelkhand. Notably, he recovered and transcribed into legible script the historical correspondence of Baghela Sardars (including Thakur Ranmat Singh) addressed to Tatya Tope from the custody of Faujdar Abdul Majid Khan.

His major institutional appointments and memberships included:

- Indian Historical Records Commission, New Delhi: member (1943–1961)
- Indian History Congress: life member (from 1944 until his death)
- Shri Raghuraj Sahitya Parishad, Rewa: prime minister / general secretary (1937–1944)
- Baghelkhand and Vindhya Pradesh Historical Records Commission: secretary, surveyor, and researcher (1945–1950)
- History of the Freedom Movement Project (Vindhya Pradesh Committee): vice-president and research director (1953–1957); in-charge of pilot project (1963–1964)
- Madhya Pradesh Itihas Parishad: member (1957)
- Madhya Pradesh Regional Records Survey Committee: member (from 1961 until his death)
- Hindi Sahitya Sammelan, District Sidhi: president (1962–1963)

== Works and publications ==
Nizami authored and translated several books and published nearly four dozen research articles in English, Hindi, and Urdu in leading historical journals.

=== Books and monographs ===
- Catalogue of Persian Manuscripts and Records in the Shri Raghubir Library, Sitamau (1980–1982), Sitamau.
- Survey of Kheechi Chauhan History (co-authored with Raghunath Singh Khichi; edited by Thakur Gopal Singh Khichi; 1990), Indroka / Jodhpur (also translated into Hindi by Dr. Prakash Purohit, Bhanwarlal Suthar, and Gangasingh Khichi).
- Madhyakaleen Futuh (1990–1992), Tonk, Rajasthan – Urdu translation of Amir Khusrau's Persian account of Sultan Alauddin Khalji's military campaigns (Khaza'in ul-Futuh).
- Padshahnama – Hindi translation of Muhammad Waris's Persian chronicle, published by Natnagar Shodh Sansthan, Sitamau (Mandsaur).
- History & Culture of Nagaur (Rajasthan) through Persian Sources (also titled Nagaur Through the Ages; 1999), Jodhpur.
- Madhyakaleen Jain Dharma Ka Itihas [History of Medieval Jainism] (2005), New Delhi (in Hindi).
- History of the Parihar Rulers of Uchahara (Nagod, District Satna).
- Ajeet Fateh Nayak Raysa: Baghelkhand Ka Alha (Ajeet Fateh Raysa) – A historical study of the Baghelkhand ballad evaluated against Persian sources, published by Madhya Pradesh Hindi Granth Academy (ISBN 81-7327-181-X).

=== Selected research papers ===
- "Genealogical Resources of the Baghela Dynasty of Rewa", Proceedings of the Indian History Congress (1945/1946).
- "Chanderi Under Malwa Sultans", published in Pandit Kailashchandra Shastri Abhinandan Granth.
- "Baghelkhand during the Great Rebellion of 1857–58", cited in D. E. U. Baker, Baghelkhand, Or, the Tigers' Lair.

== Death ==
Nizami remained active in historical guidance and writing into his nineties. He died on 16 December 2005 in Rewa at the age of 94.
