= Semariya Assembly constituency =

Constituency of the Madhya Pradesh legislative assembly in India

Coordinates: 24.79°N 81.15°E

Semariya
- Constituency No. 69 for the Madhya Pradesh Legislative Assembly

Constituency details
- Country: India
- Region: Central India
- State: Madhya Pradesh
- District: Rewa
- Lok Sabha constituency: Rewa
- Established: 2008
- Total electors: 226,107
- Reservation: None

Member of Legislative Assembly
- 16th Madhya Pradesh Legislative Assembly
- Incumbent Abhay Mishra
- Party: Indian National Congress
- Elected year: 2023
- Preceded by: K. P. Tripathi

Semariya is one of the 230 Vidhan Sabha (Legislative Assembly) constituencies of Madhya Pradesh state in central India.

It is part of Rewa district.

== Members of the Legislative Assembly ==
Before 2008, this area came under Rewa Assembly constituency.

Election	Name	Party
2008	Abhay Mishra	Bharatiya Janata Party
2013	Neelam Abhay Mishra	Bharatiya Janata Party
2018	K. P. Tripathi	Bharatiya Janata Party
2023	Abhay Mishra	Indian National Congress

== Election results ==
=== 2023 ===
2023 Madhya Pradesh Legislative Assembly election: Semariya
Party	Candidate	Votes	%	±%
INC	Abhay Mishra	56,024	34.92	+5.52
BJP	K. P. Tripathi	55,387	34.53	−0.57
BSP	Pankaj Singh	44,158	27.53	−0.67
NOTA	None of the above	1,069	0.67	+0.34
Majority		637	0.39	−5.31
Turnout		160,418	70.95	+1.96
INC gain from BJP		Swing		

=== 2018 ===
2018 Madhya Pradesh Legislative Assembly election: Semariya
Party	Candidate	Votes	%	±%
BJP	K. P. Tripathi	47,889	35.1	
INC	Triyugi Narayan Shukla	40,113	29.4	
BSP	Pankaj Singh	38,477	28.2	
Rashtriya Apna Dal	Ramrati Kewat	1,485	1.09	
NOTA	None of the above	452	0.33	
Majority		7,776	5.7	
Turnout		136,434	68.99	
BJP hold		Swing		

== See also ==
- Semariya
