= Champa Devi =

Indian politician

Champa Devi was an Indian politician from the state of the Madhya Pradesh. She represented Sirmour Vidhan Sabha constituency of Madhya Pradesh Legislative Assembly by winning General election of 1957.
