= Panna Bai Prajapati =

Indian politician

Member of Madhya Pradesh Legislative Assembly
- In office 2008–2013
- Constituency: Mangawan

Personal details
- Political party: Bharatiya Janata Party
- Profession: Politician

Panna Bai Prajapati is an Indian politician from Madhya Pradesh. She was a Member of the Madhya Pradesh Legislative Assembly from 2008, representing Mangawan Assembly constituency as a Member of the Bharatiya Janata Party.

== Political career ==
In the 2008 Madhya Pradesh Legislative Assembly elections, Prajapati was nominated by the Bharatiya Janata Party to contest the Mangawan Assembly constituency. She ran against Indian National Congress candidate Vindra Prasad and won the election with a small margin of 3,199 votes. Prajapati received a total of 24,579 votes, while Prasad secured 21,380 votes.

In the 2013 Madhya Pradesh Legislative Assembly elections, Prajapati was again nominated by the Bharatiya Janata Party to contest from the same constituency. She ran against Bahujan Samaj Party candidate Sheela Tyagi, who won the election by a narrow margin of 275 votes. Prajapati received a total of 40,074 votes, while Tyagi garnered 40,349 votes.

== See also ==
- List of chief ministers of Madhya Pradesh
- Madhya Pradesh Legislative Assembly
