= Sheela Tyagi =

Indian politician

Member of Madhya Pradesh Legislative Assembly
- In office 2013–2018
- Preceded by: Panna Bai Prajapati
- Constituency: Mangawan

Personal details
- Party: Indian National Congress
- Profession: Politician

Sheela Tyagi is an Indian politician from Madhya Pradesh. She was a Member of the Madhya Pradesh Legislative Assembly from 2013, representing Mangawan Assembly constituency as a Member of the Bahujan Samaj Party.

== Political career ==
In the 2008 Madhya Pradesh Legislative Assembly election, Sheela Tyagi was nominated by the Bahujan Samaj Party to contest from the Mangawan Assembly constituency. She ran against BJP candidate Panna Bai Prajapati and INC candidate Vindra Prasad. Tyagi lost the election by a margin of 6,742 votes, with BJP's Prajapati winning. Tyagi received a total of 17,837 votes, Prajapati secured 24,579 votes, and INC candidate Prasad received 21,380 votes.

In the 2013 Madhya Pradesh Legislative Assembly election, Tyagi and Prajapati again contested from the same constituency, representing their respective parties. This time, Tyagi won by a narrow margin of 275 votes, receiving 40,349 votes, while BJP's Prajapati received 40,074 votes.

In the 2018 Madhya Pradesh Legislative Assembly election, Tyagi was once more nominated by the Bahujan Samaj Party for the Mangawan constituency. She contested against BJP's Prajapati and INC candidate Babita Saket. Tyagi lost with securing 11,969 votes, while Prajapati received 64,488 votes, and INC candidate Saket garnered 45,958 votes.

== See also ==
- List of chief ministers of Madhya Pradesh
- Madhya Pradesh Legislative Assembly
