= Rewa Municipal Corporation =

Madhya Pradesh administrative body, India

Type
- Type: Municipal corporation of Rewa, Madhya Pradesh

History
- Founded: 1950; 76 years ago

Leadership
- Municipal commissioner: Akshat Jain, IAS
- Mayor: Ajay Mishra, INC

Structure
- Seats: 45
- Political groups: BJP: 18 seats [Independent]: 10 seats INC: 17 seats

Elections
- Last election: 2022

Website
- mcrewa.com

Rewa Municipal Corporation is responsible for the civic infrastructure and administration of the city of Rewa in Madhya Pradesh state of India. The organization is known as Nagar Palik Nigam Rewa and in short as RMC. It was established in 1950. This civic administrative body administers an area of 69 km^{2}. RMC is headed by Mayor of Rewa.

== Overview ==
The governing structure of RMC consists of political and administrative wings. The political wing is an elected body of councilors headed by a mayor. The municipal commissioner from the IAS cadre heads the administrative wing and is responsible for strategic and operational planning and management of the corporation. The commissioner takes decisions on behalf of the board or the standing committee formed from the elected councilors to perform the duties of the corporation.

== History ==
Rewa Municipality Corporation was formed in the form of a municipal corporation in the year 1950, in January 1981, the status of Nagar Palik Nigam was given by the Madhya Pradesh government. At present, Rewa has a total of 45 wards in the city, in which 6 wards are reserved for Schedule Castes and Scheduled Tribes, in which ward number 1 and 43 belong to Scheduled Tribes and ward number 28, 38, 39, 40 is reserved for Schedule Castes.

== Services ==
The RMC is responsible for administering and providing basic infrastructure to the city.

- City bus service - RCTSL
- Water Purification and Supply
- Sewage treatment and Disposal
- Garbage disposal and Street Cleanliness
- Solid Waste Management
- Disaster Management
- Building and Maintenance of Roads, Streets and Flyovers.
- Street Lighting
- Maintenance of Parks, Gardens and Open Plots (Spaces)
- Cemeteries and Crematoriums
- Registering of Births and Deaths
- Conservation of Heritage Sites
- Disease control, including Immunization
- Maintaining (Public) Municipal managed schools.

== List of mayors ==
No.	Name	Term		Party name
No.	Name	Start	End	Party name
1	Ameer Ullah Khan	1995	1997	Indian National Congress
2	Savitri Pandey	1997	-	Indian National Congress
3	Kamaljeet Singh Dang	1997	-	Indian National Congress
4	Rajendra Tamrakar	1998	1999	Bharatiya Janata Party
5	Asha Singh	1999	2005	Bharatiya Janata Party
6	Virendra Gupta	2005	2010	Bharatiya Janata Party
7	Shivendra Singh Patel	2010	2015	Bharatiya Janata Party
8	Mamta Gupta	2015	2022	Bharatiya Janata Party
9	Ajay Mishra	2022	Incumbent	Indian National Congress

== Reception ==
=== Awards and recognition ===
- On 13 January 2017, Municipal Corporation created World Record by creating Largest Human Depiction of Dustbin under Swacchta Survekshan 2017 to create awareness among the people regarding use of dustbin. Approx 6574 students from various school participated in this event. Event was inaugurated by Shri Rajendra Shukla Minister Commerce, Industry and Employment Government of Madhya Pradesh along with mayor Smt. Mamta Gupta, Commissioner Municipal corporation Rewa. Shri karmveer sharma (IAS).
- In the survey 2017 of the Ministry of Urban Administration, Government of India, the city of Rewa has made its 38th place in the country, while it is on the Third place in the Progress towards Cleanliness. Due to which the Union Minister of Urban Administration, Wakaiah Naidu has given the cleanliness award to Rewa during a program on Thursday.
