= Shivendra Singh Patel =

Indian politician

Shivendra Singh Patel is an Indian politician belonging to the Bharatiya Janata Party. He was the mayor of Rewa, Madhya Pradesh. He held the post of Rewa's Nagar president one time and two times Rewa's Nagar vice president.
