= Siddharth Tiwari =

Indian politician

Member of Madhya Pradesh Legislative Assembly
- Incumbent
- Assumed office 2023
- Preceded by: Shyamlal Dwivedi
- Constituency: Teonthar

Personal details
- Party: Bharatiya Janata Party
- Profession: Politician

Siddharth Tiwari is an Indian politician from Madhya Pradesh. He is a Member of the Madhya Pradesh Legislative Assembly from 2023, representing Teonthar Assembly constituency as a member of the Bharatiya Janata Party.

== Political career ==
In the 2023 Madhya Pradesh Legislative Assembly elections, Tiwari received a ticket from the Bharatiya Janata Party to contest from the Teonthar Assembly Constituency. He faced off against the Indian National Congress candidate, Rama Shankar Singh. Tiwari won the election by a narrow margin of 4,746 votes, securing a total of 61,082 votes, while Singh garnered 56,336 votes.

Ganesh Prasad Tiwari served as a government-appointed Personal Assistant to Siddharth Tiwari.

== See also ==
- List of chief ministers of Madhya Pradesh
- Madhya Pradesh Legislative Assembly
