= Chandramani Tripathi =

Indian politician

Chandramani Tripathi (1 July 1946 – 23 March 2013) was an Indian politician and a member of the Bharatiya Janata Party (BJP) political party. He was elected to the 12th Lok Sabha in 1998 from Rewa constituency in Madhya Pradesh state. He was re-elected to the 14th Lok Sabha in 2004 from the same constituency. He died in March 2013 at Medanata, Gurgaon after a short illness.
