= Rajkumar Urmaliya =

Indian politician

- राजकुमार उरमलिया
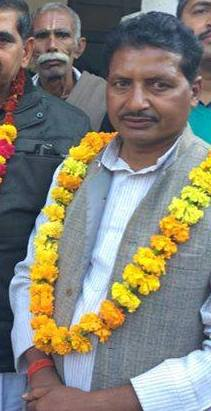

Member of the Madhya Pradesh Legislative Assembly for Sirmour (Vidhan Sabha constituency)
- In office 2008–2013
- Preceded by: Ram Lakhan Sharma
- Succeeded by: Divyraj Singh

Vice Chairman State Unit Bahujan Samaj Party, Madhya Pradesh
- In office 2009–2012

Personal details
- Born: Barhula, Rewa, Madhya Pradesh, India
- Party: Bahujan Samaj Party
- Children: 2
- Education: Graduate from APS University

Rajkumar Urmaliya is a former Member of Legislative Assembly from Sirmour Constituency in Rewa District (Vindhya Region) in the Indian state of Madhya Pradesh from 2008 to 2013.

== Education ==
He graduated in 1988 from Awdesh Pratap Singh University Rewa.

== Politician ==
He started his political Journey in 2003 when he sought the nomination in the Vidhansabha Election from Sirmour (Vidhan Sabha constituency) from Bahujan Samaj Party. He was defeated by RamLakhan Sharma (MCP) by a margin of 208 votes.

He won his second election in 2008 against the powerful political personality Shri Nivas Tiwari (Indian National Congress) and represented Sirmour Constituency from 2008 to 2013 in Madhya Pradesh Vidhanabha.

He was defeated in 2013 by Yuvraj DivyaRaj Singh Bhartiya Janata Party.

== Judgements ==
Shriniwas Tiwari vs Rajkumar Urmalia on 3 May 2013 Judgement : Madhya Pradesh High Court.

== Sources ==
- ADR. "RAJKUMAR URMALIYA(Bahujan Samaj Party(BSP)):Constituency- Sirmour(Rewa) - Affidavit Information of Candidate:". myneta.info.
- Nomination materials
- "Sirmour (Madhya Pradesh) Election Results 2014, Current and Previous MLA". elections.in.
- Rajkumar Urmaliya on Facebook
- "Department of Public Relations :: Madhya Pradesh". ocpwebserver.com.
