= Deotalab Assembly constituency =

Constituency of the Madhya Pradesh legislative assembly in India

Coordinates: 24.68°N 81.72°E

Deotalab
- Constituency No. 72 for the Madhya Pradesh Legislative Assembly

Constituency details
- Country: India
- Region: Central India
- State: Madhya Pradesh
- District: Rewa
- Lok Sabha constituency: Rewa
- Established: 1972
- Reservation: None

Member of Legislative Assembly
- 16th Madhya Pradesh Legislative Assembly
- Incumbent Girish Gautam
- Party: Bharatiya Janata Party
- Elected year: 2023
- Preceded by: Panchu Lal Prajapati

Deotalab is one of the 230 Vidhan Sabha (Legislative Assembly) constituencies of Madhya Pradesh state in central India.

It is part of Rewa district. As of 2023, it is represented by Girish Gautam of the Bharatiya Janata Party.

== Members of the Legislative Assembly ==
Election	Name	Party
1962	Raghavendra Singh	Indian National Congress
1967	C. Lal	Indian National Congress
1972	Ram Khelawan	Samyukta Socialist Party
1977	Khelawan Bhir	Janata Party
1980	Ram Khelawan	Indian National Congress (Indira)
1985	Bindra	Indian National Congress
1990	Jai Karan Saket	Bahujan Samaj Party
1993	Jai Karan Saket	Bahujan Samaj Party
1998	Panchu Lal Prajapati	Bharatiya Janata Party
2003	Panchu Lal Prajapati	Bharatiya Janata Party
2008	Girish Gautam	Bharatiya Janata Party
2013	Girish Gautam	Bharatiya Janata Party
2018	Girish Gautam	Bharatiya Janata Party
2023	Girish Gautam	Bharatiya Janata Party

== Election results ==
=== 2023 ===
2023 Madhya Pradesh Legislative Assembly election: Deotalab
Party	Candidate	Votes	%	±%
BJP	Girish Gautam	63,722	40.99	+7.76
INC	Padmesh Gautam	39,336	25.3	+2.89
BSP	Amarnath-Patel Uraf-W-Bhiya	30,251	19.46	−12.97
SP	Seema Jaiveer Singh Sengar	14,152	9.1	+7.47
AAP	Dileep Singh	1,756	1.13	+0.61
Independent	Ramyagya Sondhiya	1,613	1.04	
NOTA	None of the above	1,176	0.76	+0.3
Majority		24,386	15.69	+14.89
Turnout		155,459	63.3	+0.87
BJP hold		Swing		

=== 2018 ===
2018 Madhya Pradesh Legislative Assembly election: Deotalab
Party	Candidate	Votes	%	±%
BJP	Girish Gautam	45,043	33.23	
BSP	Seema Jaiveer Singh Sengar	43,963	32.43	
INC	Vidya Wati Patel	30,383	22.41	
SP	Ramyagya Sondhiya (Ad.)	2,213	1.63	
Independent	Akhilesh Saket	2,210	1.63	
Independent	Ashok Kumar Pandey	1,796	1.32	
Independent	Abhishek Master Buddhsen Patel	1,759	1.3	
NOTA	None of the above	623	0.46	
Majority		1,080	0.8	
Turnout		135,568	62.43	
BJP hold		Swing		

== See also ==
- Rewa district
- List of constituencies of the Madhya Pradesh Legislative Assembly
- Deotalab
