= Gurh Assembly constituency =

Constituency of the Madhya Pradesh legislative assembly in India

Coordinates: 24.50°N 81.50°E

Gurh
- Constituency No. 75 for the Madhya Pradesh Legislative Assembly

Constituency details
- Country: India
- Region: Central India
- State: Madhya Pradesh
- District: Rewa
- Lok Sabha constituency: Rewa
- Established: 1957
- Reservation: None

Member of Legislative Assembly
- 16th Madhya Pradesh Legislative Assembly
- Incumbent Nagendra Singh
- Party: Bharatiya Janata Party
- Elected year: 2023
- Preceded by: Sundar Lal Tiwari

Gurh Assembly constituency is one of the 230 Vidhan Sabha (Legislative Assembly) constituencies of Madhya Pradesh state in central India.

It is part of Rewa district.

== Members of the Legislative Assembly ==
| Election | Member | Party |
|---|---|---|
| 1957 | Shivnath Patel | Bharatiya Jana Sangh |
| 1962 | Vrajraj Singh | Indian National Congress |
| 1967 | M. Prasad | Indian National Congress |
| 1972 | Rampal Singh | Indian National Congress |
| 1977 | Chandramani Tripathi | Janata Party |
| 1980 | Rajendra Prasad | Indian National Congress (Indira) |
| 1985 | Nagendra Singh | Indian National Congress |
| 1990 | Vishambhar Nath Pandey | Communist Party of India |
| 1993 | Budhasen Patel | Bahujan Samaj Party |
| 1998 | Vidyawati Patel | Bahujan Samaj Party |
| 2003 | Nagendra Singh | Bharatiya Janata Party |
| 2008 | Nagendra Singh | Bharatiya Janata Party |
| 2013 | Sundar Lal Tiwari | Indian National Congress |
| 2018 | Nagendra Singh | Bharatiya Janata Party |
| 2023 | Nagendra Singh | Bharatiya Janata Party |

== Election results ==
=== 2023 ===
2023 Madhya Pradesh Legislative Assembly election: Gurh
| Party | Candidate | Votes | % | ±% |
|---|---|---|---|---|
| BJP | Nagendra Singh | 68,715 | 41.62 | +12.85 |
| INC | Kapidhwaj Singh | 66,222 | 40.11 | +17.98 |
| BSP | Smt. Saroj Ravind Kol (Advocate) | 18,348 | 11.11 | −7.18 |
| AAP | Prakhar Pratap Singh | 2,213 | 1.34 | +0.23 |
| CPI | Lalmani Tripathi | 1,516 | 0.92 | |
| NOTA | None of the above | 290 | 0.18 | −0.38 |
| Majority | | 2,493 | 1.51 | −3.78 |
| Turnout | | 165,104 | 70.77 | −0.46 |
| BJP hold | | Swing | | |

=== 2018 ===
2018 Madhya Pradesh Legislative Assembly election: Gurh
| Party | Candidate | Votes | % | ±% |
|---|---|---|---|---|
| BJP | Nagendra Singh | 42,569 | 28.77 | |
| SP | Kapidhwaj Singh | 34,741 | 23.48 | |
| INC | Sunderlal Tiwari | 32,735 | 22.13 | |
| BSP | Muniraj Patel | 27,063 | 18.29 | |
| AAP | Balendra Kumar Shukla | 1,639 | 1.11 | |
| Independent | Ramniwash Vishwakarma | 1,623 | 1.1 | |
| NOTA | None of the above | 831 | 0.56 | |
| Majority | | 7,828 | 5.29 | |
| Turnout | | 147,940 | 71.23 | |
| BJP gain from INC | | Swing | | |

=== 2013 ===
2013 Madhya Pradesh Legislative Assembly election: Gurh
| Party | Candidate | Votes | % | ±% |
|---|---|---|---|---|
| INC | Sundar Lal Tiwari | 33,741 | 25.33 | |
| BJP | Nagendra Singh | 32359 | 24.29 | |
| BSP | Muniraj Patel | 26099 | 19.59 | N/A |
| Independent | Kapidhwaj Singh | 25510 | 19.15 | |
| Independent | Nityanand Kushwaha | 2319 | 1.7 | |
| Independent | Ramkripal Saket | 2008 | 1.51 | |
| Independent | Ram Sundar Sharma | 1120 | 0.84 | |
| BSCP | Dherend Singh | 1107 | 0.83 | N/A |
| AD(K) | Abhishek Kumar Patel | 1088 | 0.82 | |
| SP | Amresh Patel | 1084 | 0.81 | |
| RSAD | Ramkrishan Shyamlal Yadav | 996 | 0.75 | |
| Independent | Mahesh Bhupati | 971 | 0.73 | |
| NPEP | Brijkishor Sharma | 682 | 0.51 | |
| Independent | Sudhansu Kumar | 577 | 0.43 | |
| Independent | Dineshdhar Dwivedi | 522 | 0.39 | |
| RPI(A) | Ramavatar Loni | 566 | 0.38 | |
| RPD | Ramkisan Nirat (Saket) | 474 | 0.36 | |
| NOTA | None of the Above | 2968 | 2.00 | |
| Majority | | | | |
| Turnout | | 120331 | 62.95 | |
| Swing to INC from BJP | | Swing | | |

== See also ==
- Gurh
