= Janardan Mishra =

Indian politician (born 1956)

Member of Parliament, Lok Sabha
- Incumbent
- Assumed office 16 May 2014
- Preceded by: Deoraj Singh Patel
- Constituency: Rewa

Personal details
- Born: 1 May 1956 (age 70) Hinauta, Madhya Pradesh, India
- Party: Bhartiya Janata Party
- Spouse: Vijay Kumari
- Children: 2
- Parent: Shri Ramadhar Mishra (Father)

Janardan Ramdhar Prasad Mishra (born 1 May 1956; Hindi pronunciation: [d͡ʒən̪aːɾd̪ən̪ mɪʃɾaː]) is a member of the Bhartiya Janata Party and has won the 2014 Indian general elections and also the 2019 Indian general elections from the Rewa Lok Sabha constituency.

He is District President of the Bharatiya Janata Party and a Member of Parliament.

In 2024 Lok Sabha Election, Janardan Mishra won with 4,79,754 votes. He defeated Neelam Abhay Mishra of Indian National Congress by 193374 votes.

In August 2026, Mishra created controversy by making derogatory remarks against those demanding revisit on Third Modi ministry policy on Ethanol fuel.
