= Deoraj Singh Patel =

Indian politician

Deoraj Singh Patel (born 30 December 1968 Village Sumedha, Rewa district) is an Indian politician, belonging to Bahujan Samaj Party. In the 2009 election he was elected to the 15th Lok Sabha from the Rewa Lok Sabha constituency of Madhya Pradesh.

He is married to Nisha Singh and has one daughter and two sons.
