= K. P. Tripathi =

Indian politician from Madhya Pradesh

Member of the Madhya Pradesh Legislative Assembly
- In office 2018–2023
- Preceded by: Neelam Abhay Mishra
- Constituency: Semariya

Personal details
- Born: 10/08/1979 Hardi, Rewa
- Party: Bharatiya Janata Party
- Education: B.Sc., LLB
- Alma mater: Model Science College, Rewa
- Occupation: Agriculture

K. P. Tripathi (born 10 August 1979) is an Indian politician, who represents the Semariya constituency in the Madhya Pradesh Legislative Assembly. He is a member of Bharatiya Janta Party.

== Early life and education ==
He was born on 10 Aug. 1979 at Hardi village of Semariya region. He completed his B.Sc. in 1998 from Model Science College, in Rewa and his LLB from Thakur Ranmat Singh College, Rewa.

== Political career ==
He became a member of the Madhya Pradesh Legislative Assembly by winning the Semariya seat in the 2018 Madhya Pradesh Legislative Assembly election.
