= Yamuna Prasad Shastri =

Indian politician

Yamuna Prasad Shastri was a member of Lok Sabha from Rewa, Madhya Pradesh. He was member of Bharatiya Lok Dal later on changed alliance with Janata Party. He was also a member of Madhya Pradesh Legislative Assembly He joined the Communist Party of India (Marxist) in 1993.

He participated in the Goa Liberation Movement in 1955 and lost his right eye vision due to torture by Portuguese police and later in March 1975 became totally blind. Many schools and colleges have been dedicated in his memory.
