= White Tiger Safari & Zoo Mukundpur =

Maharaja Martand Singh Judeo
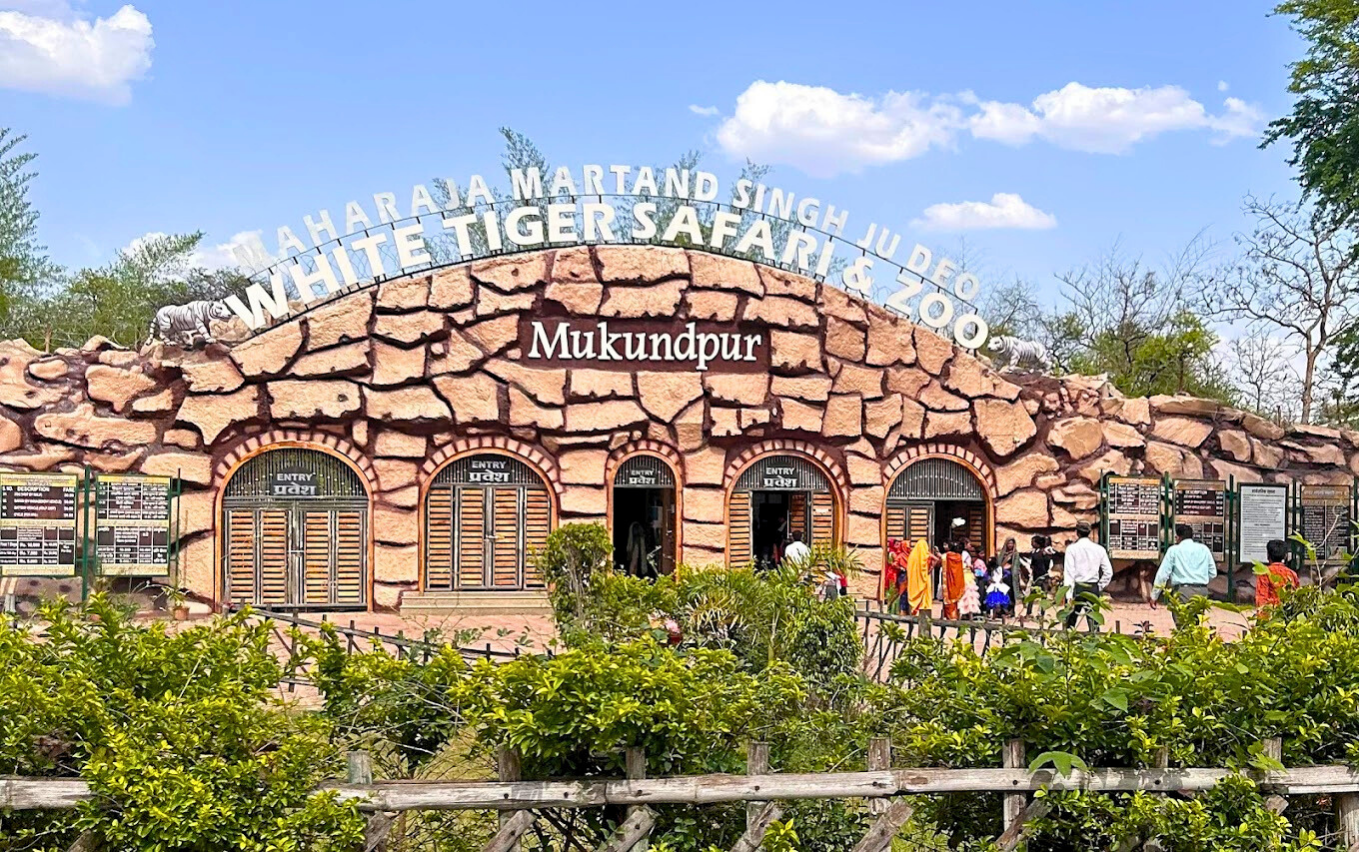
- Interactive map of Maharaja Martand Singh Judeo
- 24.4281835°N 81.24793790°E
- Date opened: 3 April 2016; 10 years ago
- Location: Mukundpur, Amarpatan, Maihar, Madhya Pradesh, India
- Land area: 100 Hectares
- No. of species: 100+
- Major exhibits: Gallery, Butterfly Park
- Website: www.whitetigersafari.in

Maharaja Martand Singh Judeo White Tiger Safari and Zoo, also known as Mukundpur White Tiger Safari, is located in Mukundpur of Maihar district of Rewa division. The main attraction at the zoo is the World's First White Tiger Safari in which visitors can see white tigers. The zoo also houses 40 different endangered species and more than 60 species of non-endangered species within its premises.

White Tiger Safari & Zoo Mukundpur was named after His Highness Maharaja Martand Singh Judeo of Rewa (princely state). Maharaja Martand Singh Judeo of Rewa (princely state) was an Indian wildlife conservationist, he discovered and captured the world's first famous white tiger, later named Mohan, in 1951. He found the rare cub in the forests of the former Rewa (princely state), located in the present-day Madhya Pradesh region of India. The discovery marked a major milestone in wildlife history, as almost all white tigers in captivity today in the world are descendants of Mohan.

== History ==
A part of the former princely state of Rewa, and now a part of Maihar district, the world's first white tiger, Mohan, a mutant variant of the Bengal tiger, was reported and captured. The zoo was established in the region in June 2015, and opened for the public in April 2016.

== Location ==
The Maharaja Martand Singh Judeo White Tiger Safari and Zoo is located in the Mukundpur of Maihar district of Rewa division. The zoo is 15 km far from Rewa and 64 km far from Maihar.

Geographically, it is one of the unique regions where the white tiger was originally found. The overall habitat includes tall trees, shrubs, grasses and bushes with mosaic of various habitat types including woodland and grassland. It spreads in area of 100 hectare of undulating topography. The natural stream flows from the middle of the zoo and the perennial river Beehad flows parallel to the northern boundary of the zoo.

== Exhibits ==
=== Mammals ===
- Jungle Cat (Felis chaus)
- Rhesus Macaque (Macaca mulatta)
- Ruddy Mongoose (Herpestes smithii)
- Indian Grey Mongoose (Herpestes edwardsi)
- Small Indian Civet (Viverricula indica)
- Common Palm Civet (Paradoxurus hermaphrodites)
- Indian Hare (Lepus nigricollis)
- Madras Tree Shrew (Anathana ellioti)
- Common Langur (Presbytis entellus)

=== Reptiles ===
- Crocodile (Crocodylus palustris)
- Indian Roofed Turtle (Pangshura tecta)
- Indian Flapshell Turtle (Lissemys punctata)
- Brook's House Gecko (Hemidactylus brookii)
- Yellow-green House Gecko (Hemidactylus flaviviridis)
- Asian House Gecko (Hemidactylus frenatus)
- Bark Gecko (Hemidactylus leschenautia)
- Indian Garden Lizard (Calotes versicolor)
- Blanfor's Rock Agama (Pssamophilus blanfordanus)
- Fan-Throated Lizard (Sitana ponticeriana)
- Common Snake Skink (Lygosoma punctatus)
- Common Indian Skink (Eutropis carinata)
- Common Indian Monitor (Varanus bengalensis)
- Common Worm Snake (Ramphotyphlops braminus)
- Beaked Worm Snake (Gryphotyphlops acutus)
- Indian Rock Python (Python molurus)
- Common Sand Boa (Gongylophis conicus)
- Indian Rat Snake (Ptyas mucosa)
- Common Trinket Snake (Coelognathus Helena Helena)
- Common Wolf Snake (Lycodon aulicus)
- Barred Wolf Snake (Lycodon straitus)
- Buff Stiped Keelback (Amphiesma stolatum)
- Indian Green Keelback (Macropisthodon plumbicolor)
- Checkered Keelback Water Snake (Xenochrophis piscator)
- Common Kukri Snake (Oligodon arnensis)
- Banded Racer Snake (Argyrogena fasciolata)
- Common Cat Snake (Boiga trigonata)
- Forsten's Cat Snake (Boiga forsteni)
- Green Vine Snake (Ahaetulla nasutus)
- Spectacled Cobra (Naja naja)
- Common Krait (Bungarus caeruleus)
- Russell's Viper (Daboia russelii)
- Indian Saw-Scaled Viper (Echis carinatus)
