= Dabhaura =

Town in Madhya Pradesh, India

- Town
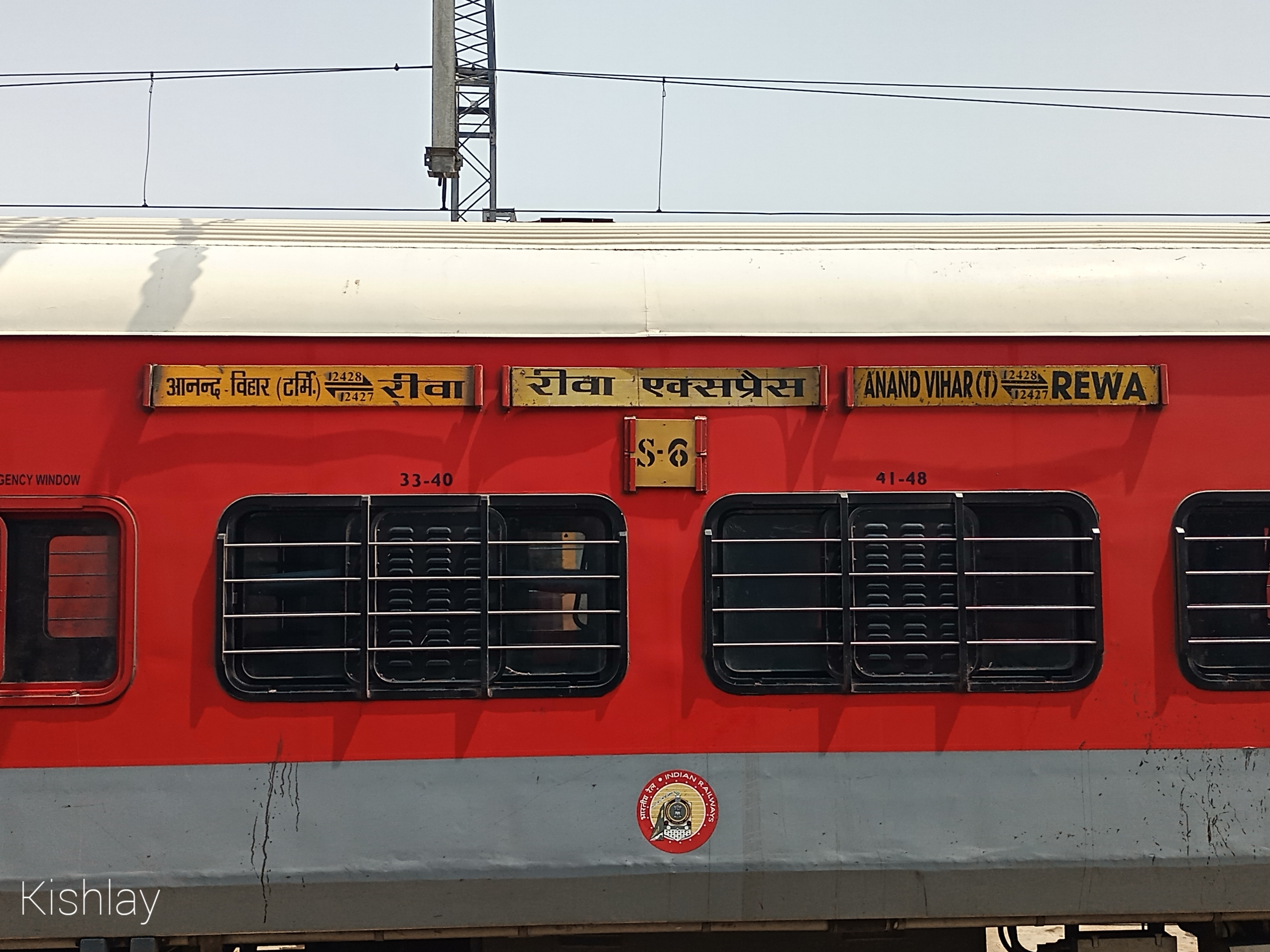
- Rewa-Delhi Express which stops at Dabhaura

- Location in Madhya Pradesh, India Dabhaura (India)
- Coordinates: 25.11°N 81.30°E
- Country: India
- State: Madhya Pradesh
- District: Rewa
- Elevation: 305 m (1,001 ft)

Population (2011)
  - Total: 8,260

Languages
  - Official: Hindi
- Time zone: UTC+5:30 (IST)

Dabhaura is a Nagar Parishad in Rewa district of Madhya Pradesh in India. It is located on Jabalpur Prayagraj Railway Section, and a major railway station of this section.

== Geography ==
Dabhaura is located in 25.11°N 81.30°E. It has an average elevation of 305 metres (1,000 feet).

It is located northwest part and Baghelkhand region of Madhya Pradesh. 486556 is pin code of Dabhaura.

== Demographics ==
As per Census of India 2011 Dabhaura town has population of 8,260 of which 4,270 are males while 3,990 are females.
