= Martand Singh =

Indian conservationist and politician (1923–1995)

Member of Parliament, Lok Sabha
- In office 1971–1977
- Preceded by: S.N.Shukla
- Succeeded by: Yamuna Prasad Shastri
- Constituency: Rewa

Member of Parliament, Lok Sabha
- In office 1980–1989
- Preceded by: Yamuna Prasad Shastri
- Succeeded by: Yamuna Prasad Shastri
- Constituency: Rewa

Personal details
- Born: 15 March 1923 Rewa, Bagelkhand Agency, British India
- Died: 20 November 1995 (aged 72) India
- Spouse: Maharani Pravina Kumari
- Children: Pushpraj Singh
- Parent: Maharaja Gulab Singh
- Occupation: Conservationist; Parliamentarian; Maharaja of Rewa
- Awards: Padma Bhushan

Maharaja Martand Singh Ju Deo Bahadur (15 March 1923 – 20 November 1995) was an Indian wildlife conservationist, former member of parliament from Rewa, former Rajpramukh of Vindhya Pradesh and the last ruling Maharaja of princely state of Rewa.

== Life and career ==
Born in 1923 to Maharaja Gulab Singh Judeo Bahadur at Fort of Govindgarh, then the Maharajah of Rewa, he did his college studies at Daly College, Indore and continued at Mayo College, Ajmer from where he graduated in 1941. After the imprisonment of his father Maharaja Gulab Singh Je Deo Bahadur in 1946 by the British authorities for his freedom struggle, Martand Singh became the Maharajah of Rewa and retained the title, but not the power, until the government abolished royalty in 1970.

Fascinated by the white tiger, he worked to protect the mutant variety of Bengal tiger and Maharaja Martand Singh of Rewa (princely state) discovered and captured the world's first famous white tiger, later named Mohan, in 1951. He found the rare cub in the forests of the former Rewa (princely state), located in the present-day Madhya Pradesh region of India. The discovery marked a major milestone in wildlife history, as almost all white tigers in captivity today in the world are descendants of Mohan and he made the region poacher-free. He also reared a white tiger (named Mohan) which he captured in 1951. After the abolition of royalty, Singh represented Rewa in the 5th Lok Sabha (1971), 7th Lok Sabha (1980) and the 8th Lok Sabha (1984). The Government of India awarded him the third-highest civilian honour of the Padma Bhushan, in 1986, for his contributions to society.

His Highness Maharaja Martand Singh was married to Princess Pravina of Cutch State (also spelled Kutch) and the couple had one son. He died on 20 November 1995, at the age of 72. He was again in the news in 2013 when his son filed a lawsuit regarding the allegedly illegal sale of Rewa Kothi, their Mumbai bungalow with a reported value of ₹2 billion, using a fake power of attorney. Martand Singh's property is controlled by His Highness Maharaja Martand Singh Charitable Trust.

Singh committed to nature conservation and the fight against poaching. The foundation of the Bandhavgarh National Park in the Vindhya Mountains was his initiative. In particular, the preservation of the white tiger was close to his heart. He succeeded in breeding the mutant in captivity for the first time with Mohan. All white Bengal tigers living today ultimately trace their pedigree back to this specimen.

== Honours ==
- World's first White Tiger Safari located at Mukundpur, Satna was named after him as Maharaja Martand Singh Ju Deo White Tiger Safari and Zoo.
- Martand Singh was awarded the Padma Bhushan in 1986 by the Government of India for wildlife conservation.

== Cabinet ==
- Munshi Ramgopal Misra
- Munshi Vishnu prasad
- Seth Umashankar Shah
- Seth Mohanlal Jain Singhai
- Lal Mahesh Pratap Singh (Baderi)
- Lal Chatradharl Singh (Chandia)
- Tiwari Umadatta (Manikwar)
- Lal Govind Singh (Kripalpur)

(Information provided by Pushpraj Singh in an interview based on Royal texts.)
