= Teonthar Assembly constituency =

Constituency of the Madhya Pradesh legislative assembly in India

Coordinates: 24.98°N 81.64°E

Teonthar
- Constituency No. 70 for the Madhya Pradesh Legislative Assembly
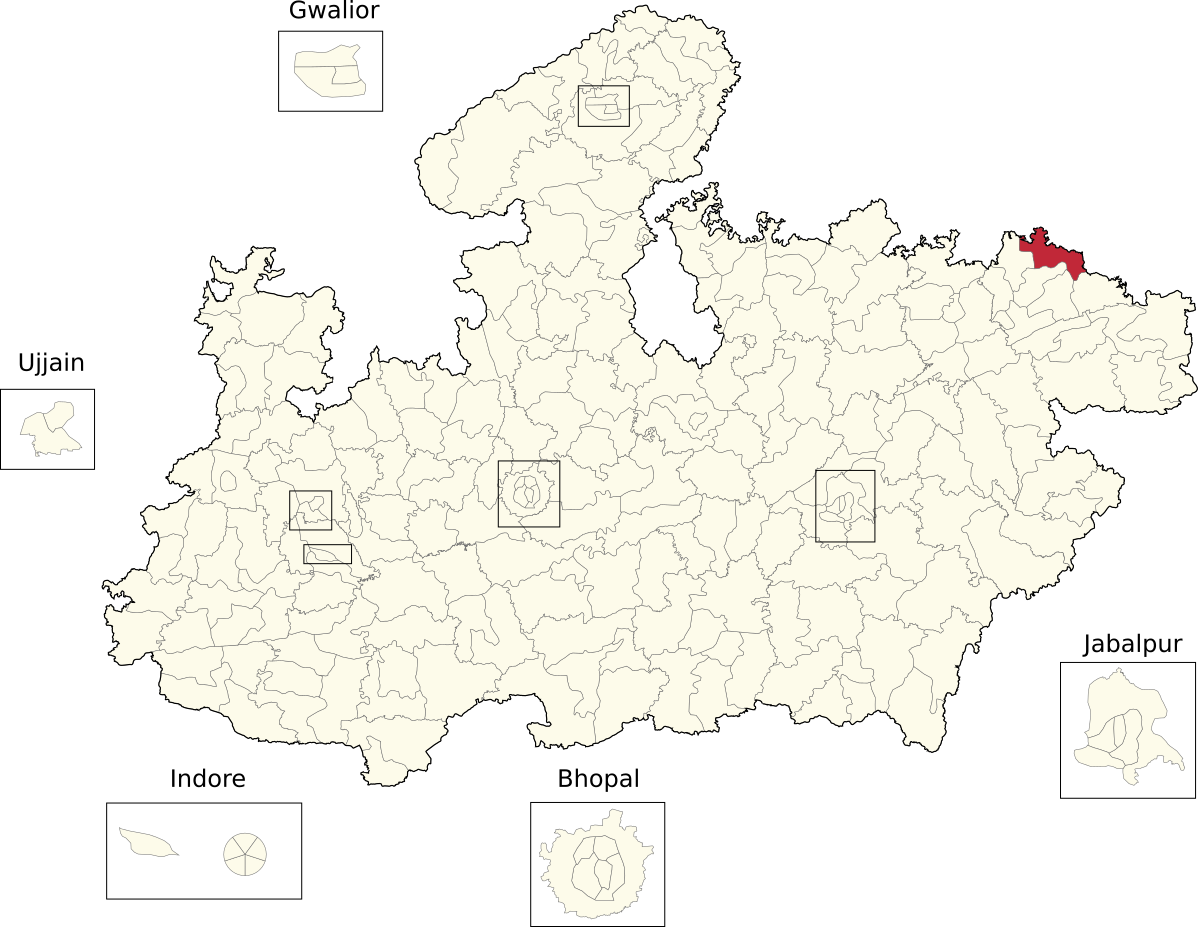

Constituency details
- Country: India
- Region: Central India
- State: Madhya Pradesh
- District: Rewa
- Lok Sabha constituency: Rewa
- Established: 1962
- Reservation: None

Member of Legislative Assembly
- 16th Madhya Pradesh Legislative Assembly
- Incumbent Siddharth Tiwari
- Party: Bharatiya Janata Party
- Elected year: 2023

Teonthar Assembly constituency is one of the 8 Vidhan Sabha (Legislative Assembly) constituencies of Rewa District and of the 230 constituencies of Madhya Pradesh state in central India.

This constituency came into being since 1962 Legislative Assembly elections.

The incumbent MLA is Siddharth Tiwari from BJP since 2023 elections.

== Members of the Legislative Assembly ==
Year	Member	Party
2018	Shyamlal Dwivedi	Bharatiya Janata Party
2023	Siddharth Tiwari	Bharatiya Janata Party

== Election results ==
=== 2023 ===
2023 Madhya Pradesh Legislative Assembly election: Teonthar
Party	Candidate	Votes	%	±%
BJP	Siddharth Tiwari	61,082	40.99	+0.36
INC	Rama Shankar Singh	56,336	37.8	+1.29
BSP	Devendra Singh	24,393	16.37	+2.97
Vindhya Janta Party	Commando Arun Gautam (Ex-Army)	1,791	1.2	
NOTA	None of the above	1,148	0.77	+0.54
Majority		4,746	3.19	−0.93
Turnout		149,025	68.53	−0.21
BJP hold		Swing		

=== 2018 ===
2018 Madhya Pradesh Legislative Assembly election: Teonthar
Party	Candidate	Votes	%	±%
BJP	Shyamlal Dwivedi	52,729	40.63	
INC	Ramashankar Singh	47,386	36.51	
BSP	Geeta Rajmani Majhi	17,396	13.4	
Independent	Ramashray Harijan	1,450	1.12	
Independent	Ranjan Tripathi	1,308	1.01	
Sapaks Party	Dharmendra Kumar Ga Utam (Dadu)	1,295	1.0	
NOTA	None of the above	300	0.23	
Majority		5,343	4.12	
Turnout		129,792	68.74	
BJP gain from		Swing		

=== Older results ===
Legend
Affiliation	Full form
BJP	Bharatiya Janata Party
BJS	Bharatiya Jana Sangh
BSP	Bahujan Samaj Party
CPI	Communist Party of India
INC	Indian National Congress
JD	Janata Dal
JNP	Janata Party
LKD	Lok Dal
SOC	Socialist
SSP	Sanghata Socialist Party

Electoral Results by election year
Year	Electors	Votes Polled	Percentage Voting	Total Candidates	Women candidates	Winner	Votes garnered	Percentage	Affiliation	Runner up	Votes garnered	Affiliation
1962	55532	24477	44.08	N.A.	N.A.	Lal Kamleshwar Singh	7819	31.95	INC	Mayavir Singh	7660	SOC
1967	63876	37631	58.91	N.A.	N.A.	K. Singh	14633	38.89	INC	M. Singh	11100	SSP
1972	73561	45899	62.40	6	0	Triveni Prasad	11358	24.75	BJS	Ganga Singh	10939	CPI
1977	83256	51817	62.24	N.A.	N.A.	Shrinivas Tiwari	19564	37.76	INC	Ramlakhana Singh	18801	JNP
1980	90289	52936	58.63	N.A.	N.A.	Shrinivas Tewari	16632	31.42	INC	Susheel Kumar	10455	BJP
1985	100939	64676	64.07	N.A.	N.A.	Garud Kumar	20371	31.50	INC	Ramakant Tiwari	20229	LKD
1990	134080	90829	67.74	13	0	Ramakant Tiwari	33413	36.79	INC	Ram Lakhan Singh	30478	JD
1993	147415	97128	65.89	20	1	Ramlakhan Singh	30614	31.52	JD	Ramakant Tiwari	22326	INC
1998	159776	104430	65.34	9	0	Ramakant Tiwari	33599	32.17	BJP	Ramgarib Banvasi	26590	BSP
2003	182491	116852	64.07	13	0	Ramkant tiwari	37110	31.76	BJP	Ramgarib Banvasi	34320	BSP
2008	137929	92481	67.27	16	3	Ram Garib Kol	25987	28.10	BSP	Kaushlesh Dwivedi	19600	INC
2013	177822	120831	67.95	19	2	Pd. Ramakant Tiwari	44347	36.70	BJP	Ramashankar Singh	34590	INC

== See also ==
- Teonthar
