= Rewa Assembly constituency =

Constituency of the Madhya Pradesh legislative assembly in India

Coordinates: 24.54°N 81.30°E

Rewa
- Constituency No. 74 for the Madhya Pradesh Legislative Assembly

Constituency details
- Country: India
- Region: Central India
- State: Madhya Pradesh
- District: Rewa
- Lok Sabha constituency: Rewa
- Established: 1951
- Reservation: None

Member of Legislative Assembly
- 16th Madhya Pradesh Legislative Assembly
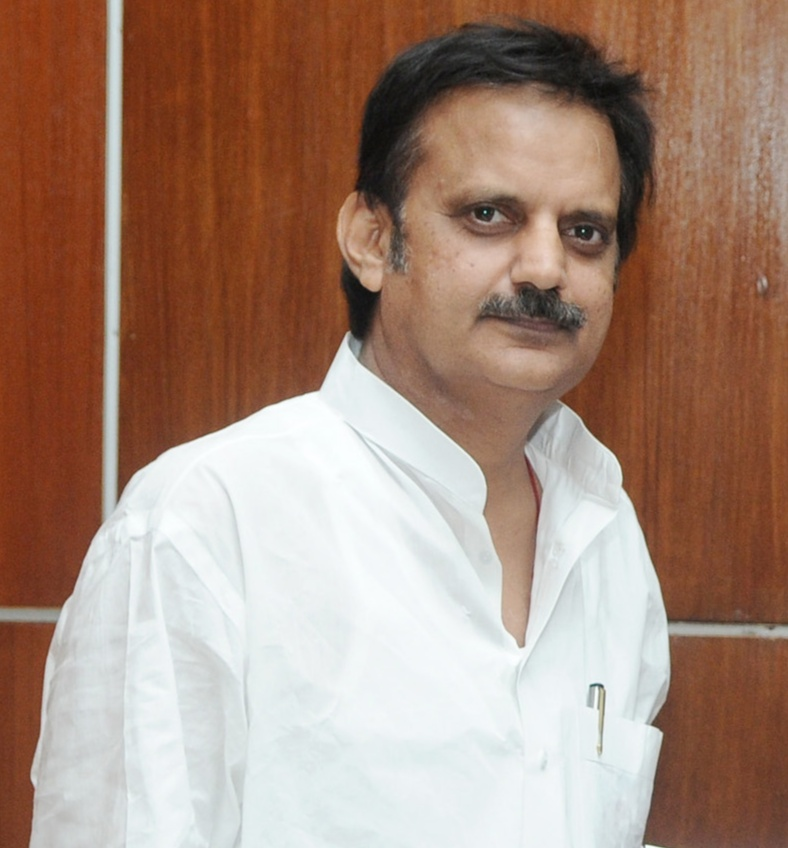
- Incumbent Rajendra Shukla
- Party: Bharatiya Janata Party
- Elected year: 2023
- Preceded by: Pushpraj Singh

Rewa Assembly constituency is one of the 230 Vidhan Sabha (Legislative Assembly) constituencies of Madhya Pradesh state in central India.

== Overview ==
Rewa is one of the 8 Vidhan Sabha constituencies located in Rewa district. This constituency covers the entire area of Rewa Municipality and is part of the Huzur tehsil of the district.

== Members of Legislative Assembly ==
=== Vindhya Pradesh Legislative Assembly ===
Year	Member	Party
1952	Jagdish Chandra Joshi	Socialist Party

=== Madhya Pradesh Legislative Assembly ===
Year	Member	Party
1957	Joshi Jagdinsh Chand	Independent politician
1962	Shatrughan Singh	Indian National Congress
1967	Shatrughan Singh	Indian National Congress
1972	Muni Prasad Shukla	Indian National Congress
1977	Prem Lal Mishra	Janata Party
1980	Muni Prasad Shukla	Indian National Congress (Indira)
1985	Prem Lal Mishra	Janata Party
1990	Pushpraj Singh	Indian National Congress
1993	Pushpraj Singh	Indian National Congress
1998	Pushpraj Singh	Independent politician
2003	Rajendra Shukla	Bharatiya Janata Party
2008	Rajendra Shukla	Bharatiya Janata Party
2013	Rajendra Shukla	Bharatiya Janata Party
2018	Rajendra Shukla	Bharatiya Janata Party
2023	Rajendra Shukla	Bharatiya Janata Party

== Election results ==
=== 2023 ===
2023 Madhya Pradesh Legislative Assembly election: Rewa
Party	Candidate	Votes	%	±%
BJP	Rajendra Shukla	77,680	51.16	+0.12
INC	Rajendra Sharma	56,341	37.11	−0.7
BSP	Madhumas Chandra Soni	8,524	5.61	+0.91
AAP	Eng. Deepak Singh Patel	5,034	3.32	+2.97
NOTA	None of the above	893	0.59	+0.11
Majority		21,339	14.05	+0.82
Turnout		151,827	68.9	+1.96
BJP hold		Swing		

=== 2018 ===
2018 Madhya Pradesh Legislative Assembly election: Rewa
Party	Candidate	Votes	%	±%
BJP	Rajendra Shukla	69,806	51.04	
INC	Abhay Mishra	51,717	37.81	
BSP	Kasim Khan	6,427	4.7	
AD(S)	Krishna Kumar Gupta (K.K.)	1,603	1.17	
NOTA	None of the above	660	0.48	
Majority		18,089	13.23	
Turnout		136,778	66.94	
BJP hold		Swing		
