= Mangawan Assembly constituency =

Constituency of the Madhya Pradesh legislative assembly in India

Coordinates: 24.65°N 81.55°E

Mangawan
- Constituency No. 73 for the Madhya Pradesh Legislative Assembly

Constituency details
- Country: India
- Region: Central India
- State: Madhya Pradesh
- District: Rewa
- Lok Sabha constituency: Rewa
- Established: 1972
- Reservation: SC

Member of Legislative Assembly
- 16th Madhya Pradesh Legislative Assembly
- Incumbent Narendra Prajapati
- Party: Bharatiya Janata Party
- Elected year: 2023
- Preceded by: Panchu Lal Prajapati

Mangawan is one of the 230 Vidhan Sabha (Legislative Assembly) constituencies of Madhya Pradesh state in central India. It is part of Rewa district. As of 2023, it is represented by Narendra Prajapati of the Bharatiya Janata Party.

== Members of the Legislative Assembly ==
Year	Member	Party
1957	Rukmani Raman Pratap Singh	Independent politician
1962	Rukmani Raman Pratap Singh	Indian National Congress
1967	Rukmani Raman Pratap Singh	Indian National Congress
1972	Shriniwas Tiwari	Samyukta Socialist Party
1977	Rukmani Raman Pratap Singh	Indian National Congress
1980	Champa Devi	Indian National Congress (Indira)
1985	Champa Devi	Indian National Congress
1990	Shriniwas Tiwari	Indian National Congress
1993	Shriniwas Tiwari	Indian National Congress
1998	Shriniwas Tiwari	Indian National Congress
2003	Girish Gautam	Bharatiya Janata Party
2008	Panna Bai Prajapati	Bharatiya Janata Party
2013	Sheela Tyagi	Bahujan Samaj Party
2018	Panchu Lal Prajapati	Bharatiya Janata Party
2023	Narendra Prajapati	Bharatiya Janata Party

== Election results ==
=== 2023 ===
2023 Madhya Pradesh Legislative Assembly election: Mangawan
Party	Candidate	Votes	%	±%
BJP	Narendra Prajapati	78,754	50.47	▲1.93
INC	Babita Saket	46,842	30.02	▼4.57
BSP	Ramayan Saket	22,895	14.67	▲5.66
NOTA	None of the above	1,947	1.25	▼0.86
Majority		31,912	20.45	▲6.5
Turnout		156,044	62.53	▲2.6
BJP hold		Swing		

=== 2018 ===
2018 Madhya Pradesh Legislative Assembly election: Mangawan
Party	Candidate	Votes	%	±%
BJP	Panchu Lal Prajapati	64,488	48.54	
INC	Babita Saket	45,958	34.59	
BSP	Sheela Tyagi	11,969	9.01	
Independent	Mahendra Dahiya	1,373	1.03	
Jan Samman party	Manindra Saket	1,315	0.99	
NOTA	None of the above	2,797	2.11	
Majority		18,530	13.95	
Turnout		132,862	59.93	
BJP gain from		Swing		

== See also ==
- Mangawan
