= Gurh =

- Town
- Location in Madhya Pradesh, India Gurh (India)
- Coordinates: 24.52°N 81.52°E
- Country: India
- State: Madhya Pradesh
- District: Rewa
- Elevation: 305 m (1,001 ft)

Population (2001)
  - Total: 12,445

Languages
  - Official: Hindi
- Time zone: UTC+5:30 (IST)
- ISO 3166 code: IN-MP
- Vehicle registration: MP

Gurh is a town and a nagar panchayat in Rewa district in the Indian state of Madhya Pradesh. It is 23 kilometres (14 miles) from Rewa city. It is also famous for the Bhairav Baba statue. Kasthar Nath Swami Temple and Local Overview

The Kasthar Nath Swami Temple is a symbol of deep faith and devotion in the region. This town is administratively divided into 15 wards. The first ward begins at Chandehri, while the last ward is Gudhwa. The area is well-equipped with paved roads, electricity, and all essential public facilities.

Dr. Balmik Prasad Verma – A medical doctor who practiced abroad before returning to Gurh around 1975, where he served the local community.

Located just 5 kilometers from Gurh town, the region is home to Asia’s largest solar power plant, adding to its prominence.

Notable personalities such as Chandan Shukla Tejju are known for their positive contributions and respected character within the community. [1][2]

---

See also

Gurh

Chandehri

Solar Power in India

Notable people from Rewa district Its nearest towns are Manikwar 18 km Mangawan 25 km and Rewa District 23 km.

== Geography ==
Gurh is located at 24.52°N 81.52°E. It has an average elevation of 305 metres (1,000 feet).

== Demographics ==
As of 2001 India census, Gurh had a population of 12,445. Males constitute 52% of the population and females 48%. Gurh has an average literacy rate of 57%, lower than the national average of 59.5%: male literacy is 69%, and female literacy is 43%. In Gurh, 17% of the population is under 6 years of age.

== Rewa Solar Plant ==
The 750MW Rewa Ultra Mega Solar plant, one of the largest solar power projects in India was commissioned in July 2018. Rewa Ultra Mega Solar is an operational ground mounted, grid-connected photovoltaic solar park spread over an area of 1,590 acres (6.9 km2) in the Gurh tehsil of Rewa district.

== Transport ==
Nearest Airport is Rewa Airport.

By bus Bus stand available in the city bus stand Gurh. It's connected nearby cities by bus service.
