= Misirgawan, Hanumana =

Village in Madhya Pradesh, India

Coordinates: 24.735°N 82.135°E

Misirgawan is a village in Hanumana Tehsil in the Rewa District of the Indian state of Madhya Pradesh. It is part of Rewa Division and is located 90 kilometres (56 mi) east of the district headquarters Rewa, 7 kilometres (4.3 mi) from Hanumana, and 555 kilometres (345 mi) from the state capital, Bhopal.

Misirgawan's pin code is 486335 and the postal head office is Mauganj.

== Neighbouring Villages ==
Malaigawan (3 km), Naun Kalan (1 km), Naunkhurd (3 km), Lasa (6 km), Hanumana (7 km) are the nearby villages to Misirgawan.

== Colleges near Misirgawan ==
Seth Raghunath Prasad Arts & Commerce Degree College located Hanumana, which is 7 kilometres (4.3 mi) from Misirgawan.
