= Malpar =

- village
- Location in Madhya Pradesh, India Malpar (India)
- Coordinates: 25.0088°N 81.6394°E
- Country: India
- State: Madhya Pradesh
- District: Rewa
- Tehsils: Teonthar

Government
  - Body: Gram panchayat

Area
  - Total: 2.15 km^{2} (0.83 sq mi)
- Elevation: 110 m (360 ft)

Population (2011)
  - Total: 759
  - Density: 353/km^{2} (914/sq mi)
- Demonym: मलपरहा

Languages
  - Official: Hindi, Bagheli language
- Time zone: UTC+5:30 (IST)
- PIN: 486220
- ISO 3166 code: IN-MP
- Vehicle registration: MP 17
- Lok Sabha Constituency: Rewa (Lok Sabha constituency)
- Sex ratio: 1169 ♂/♀
- Average Literacy Rate: 79.19%
- Vidhan Sabha constituency: Teonthar

Malpar is a village and a gram panchayat in Rewa district in the Indian state of Madhya Pradesh.

== Location ==
The village is located at a distance of 2.8 kilometers from the town of Teonthar. It is 80 kilometers from district headquarters in Rewa and about 60 kilometers from Prayagraj. The village is situated on the banks of Tamsa River.

Distance of Malpar from various places
City	Distance (Approx) in km
Delhi	763
Mumbai	1,342
Bhopal	572
Varanasi	170
Prayagraj	61

== Transportation ==
Main modes of transportation are buses and taxis.Nearest railway stations are Shankargarh, Prayagraj and Rewa. Nearest airport is prayagaraj Airport.

== Demographics ==
Malpar is a medium-sized village with totaE 143 families residing. The village has a population of 759 of which 350 aren males while 409 are females as per 2011 Census of India. 12.65% of total population of village is under 6 years of age. Average Sex Ratio of Malpar village is 1169 which is higher than Madhya Pradesh state average of 931. Malpar village has literacy rate of 79.19% compared to 69.32% of Madhya Pradesh. In Malpar Male literacy stands at 92.05% while female literacy rate was 68.42%. Malpar village is administrated by Sarpanch (Head of Village) who is elected representative of the village.

Demographics of Malpar
1. Males (46.1%)
2. Females (53.9%)
