= Keoti Fort =

Fort in India

- Part of Madhya Pradesh, India
- Rewa District, Madhya Pradesh, India
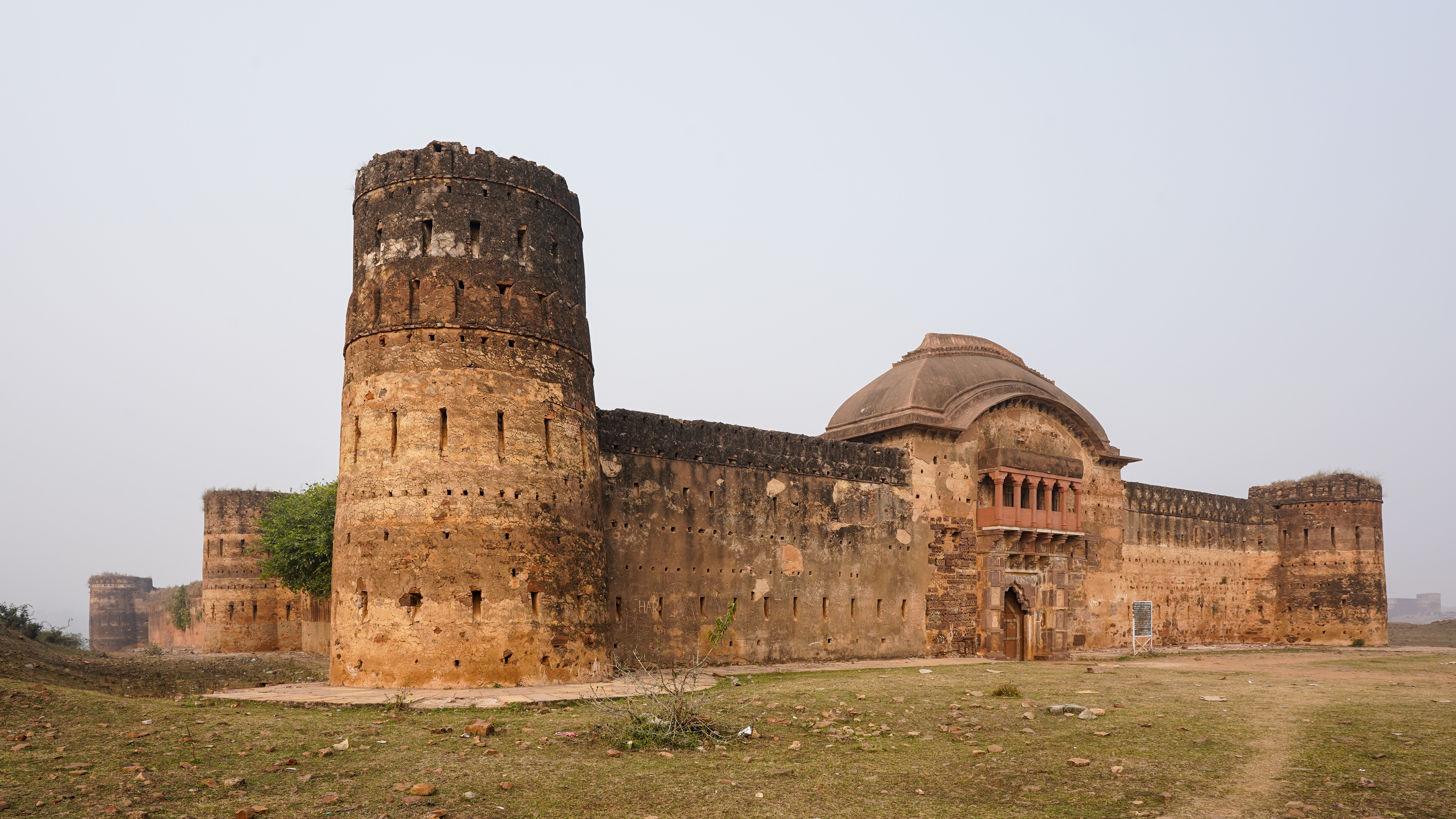
- Keoti Fort, front and south side, ca. 2024

Site information
- Type: Fort
- Open to the public: yes
- Condition: dilapidated

Location
- Keoti fort within Madhya Pradesh
- Location within Madhya Pradesh
- Coordinates: 24.81714°N 81.45725°E

Keoti Fort (also Keonti Fort) is an Indian fortress (qila) situated on the Rewa Plateau about 53 kilometres (33 mi) north-east of the city of Rewa, in Rewa district in the Indian state of Madhya Pradesh.

== History ==
Keoti Fort is said to have been constructed by Raja Parmal Dev in 1500 AD, who was a Baghel Rajput King and son of Maharaja of Rewa (princely state) mentioned in an account of the Indian Rebellion of 1857. Thakur Ranmat Singh Baghel was a descendent of Kothi Royal Family of Kothi State, a Baghel Rajput sardar (commander) in the army of Maharaja Raghuraj Singh of Rewa (princely state) and later a prominent leader in the Rebellion in Rewa State during 1857 revolt in Baghelkhand, went into hiding in Keoti Fort along with his uncle Thakur Shyam Shah Baghel. In a battle at the Keoti Fort, Ranmat Singh killed the British Colonial who came to arrest him, thereby defeating the British forces.

The Maharaja Raghuraj Singh of Rewa wanted Ranmat Singh to surrender to the British authorities with the assurance that he would not be killed. However his Diwan Dinbandhu Pandey of Rewa acted as an informant for the British, which led to the capture of Ranmat Singh by the British authorities. He was hanged in 1860 for the murder of the British officers along with his active role in 1857 revolt against the British authorities in Baghelkhand where he defeated the British authorities in multiple battles across areas like Nagod, Bhilsain, Chitrakoot, Nowgong, and Keoti.

During the Revolt of 1857 in Baghelkhand, the Kothi State (Kothi princely state, Satna) is noted for helping Thakur Ranmat Singh Baghel. Historical accounts mention that Raja Bahadur Avdhoot Singh Baghel of Kothi State provided rebels with shelter, ammunition, food, money, and support for recruiting fighters.

== Geography ==
Keoti Fort is situated on the Rewa Plateau near the northern end of the Vindhya Escarpment. The fort is built on the right bank of a ravine that the Mahana River has cut into the escarpment. The 98 m (322 ft) high Keoti Falls is on the opposite side of the ravine, visible from the northern part of the fort. The elevation of Keoti Fort is 280 m (920 ft) above mean sea level.

Keoti Fort is about 53 km (33 mi) from the city of Rewa. The nearest airport is located at Prayagraj (Allahabad) in Uttar Pradesh, a distance of 114 km (71 mi).

== Architecture ==
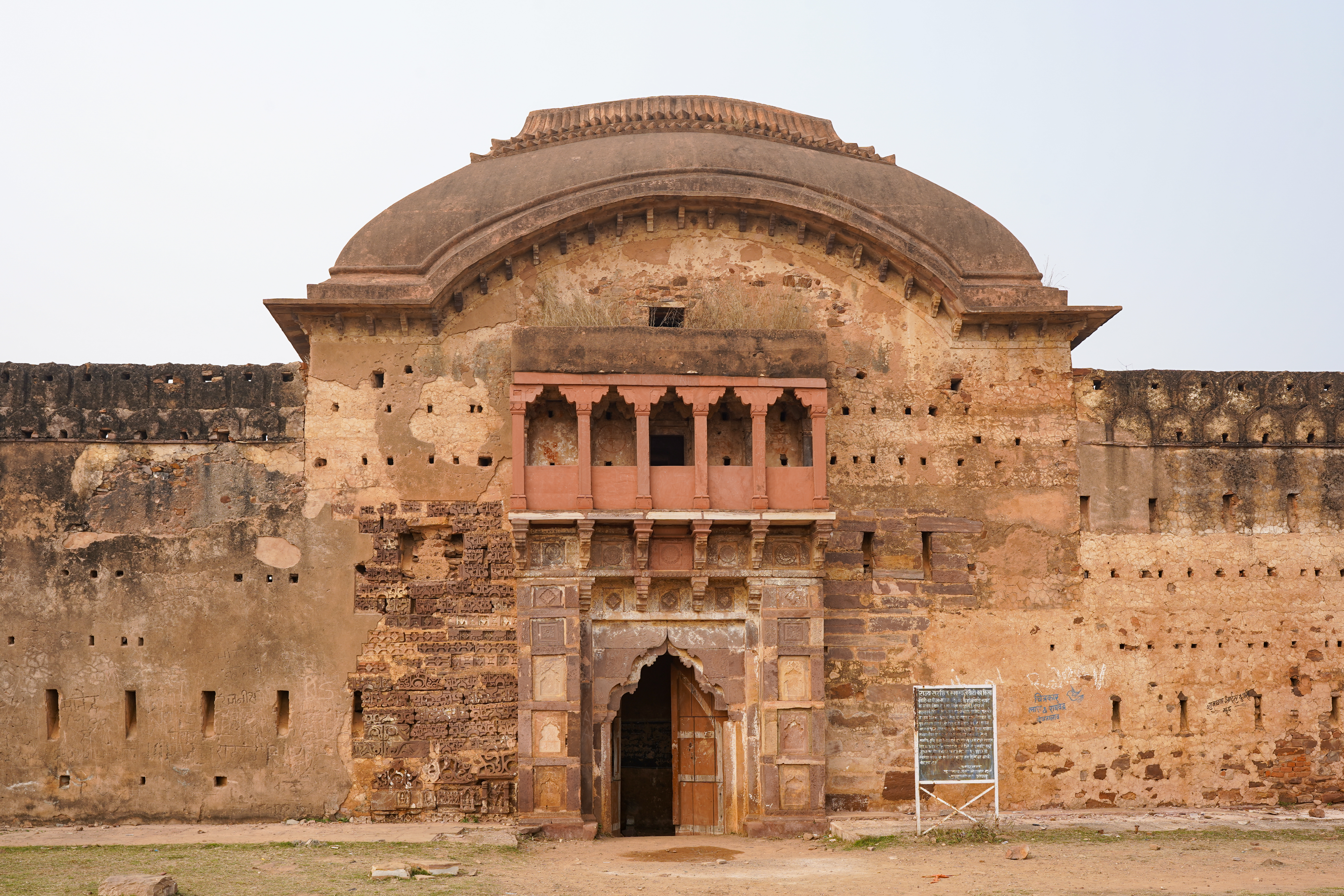
Entrance in the east facade

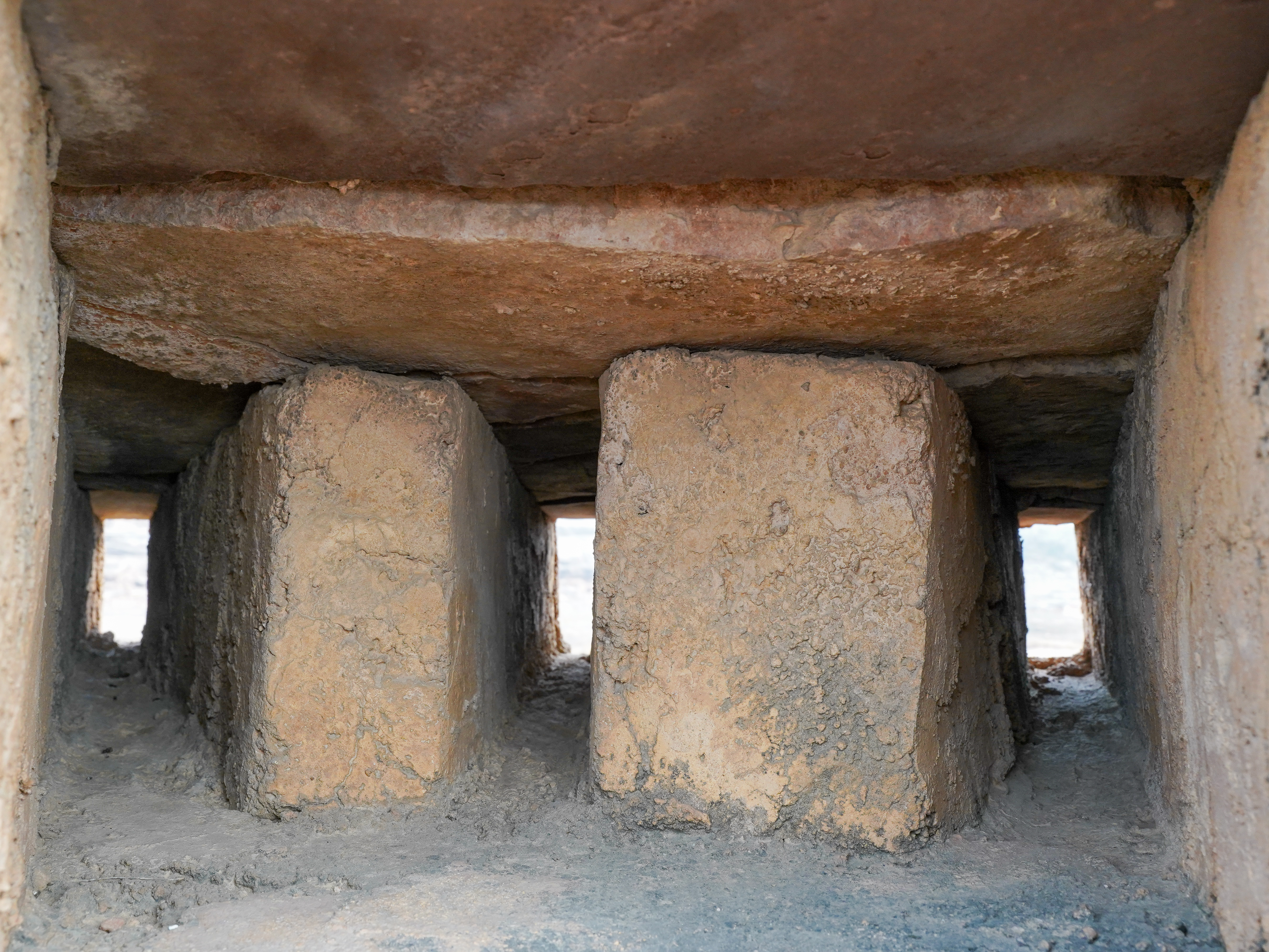
Loophole with 3 angles of fire

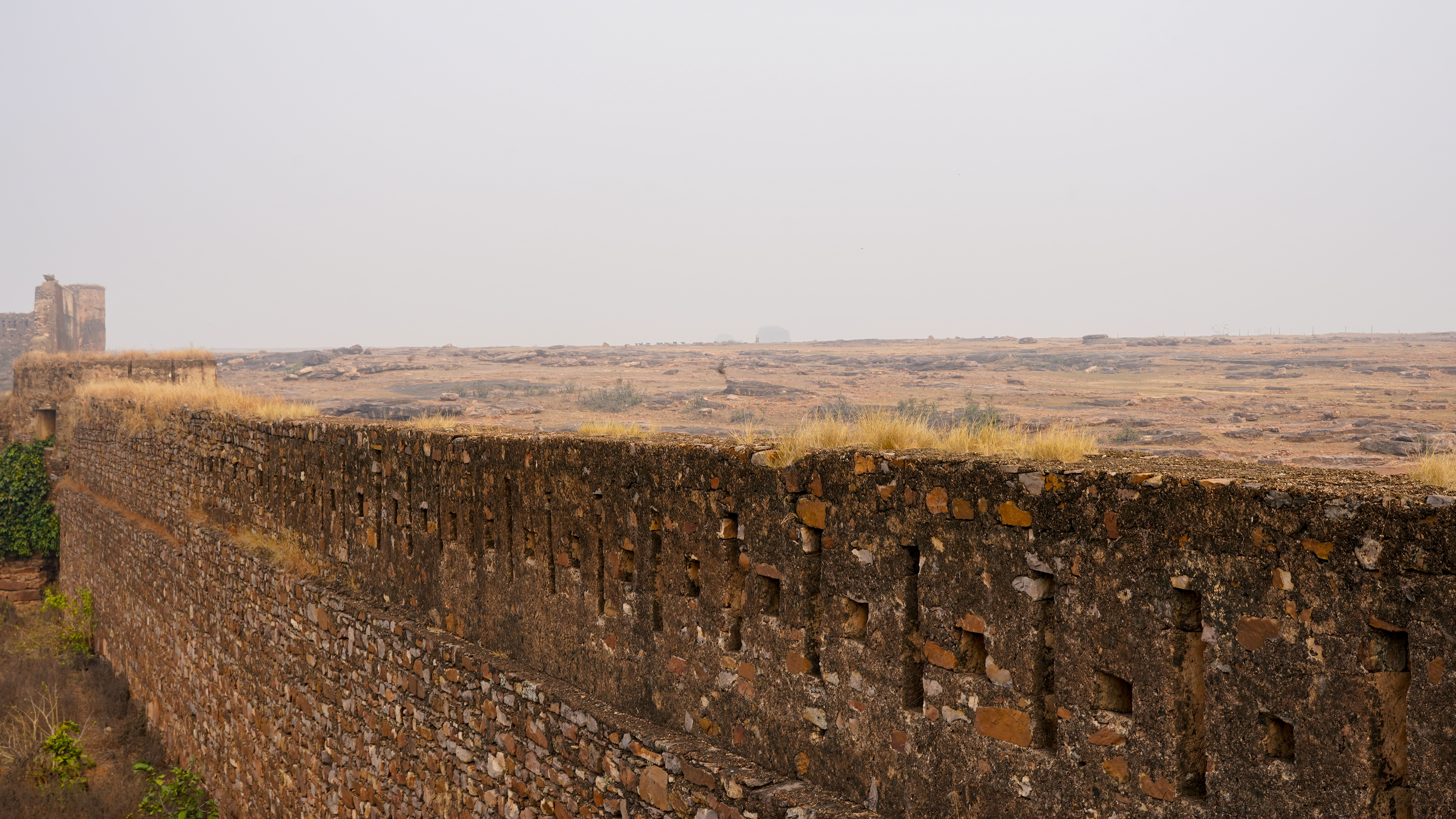
North-east wall with loopholes facing the flat plateau

The west wall of the fort runs along the Mahana ravine for about 200 m (660 ft). The south wall extends about 100 m (330 ft) east from the ravine. The east wall with the main entrance is about 40 m (130 ft) long. There after, the fort depth narrows to about 25 m (82 ft) at the northern end of the fort. The total area enclosed by the walls is about 1.0 ha (2.5 acres). Towers are located at the corners of the outer walls.

The construction material is stone and clay mortar. Loopholes with three angles of fire are built into the outer walls at regular intervals and at various heights. These are useful for defense against enemy coming across the flat plateau.

== Tourism ==
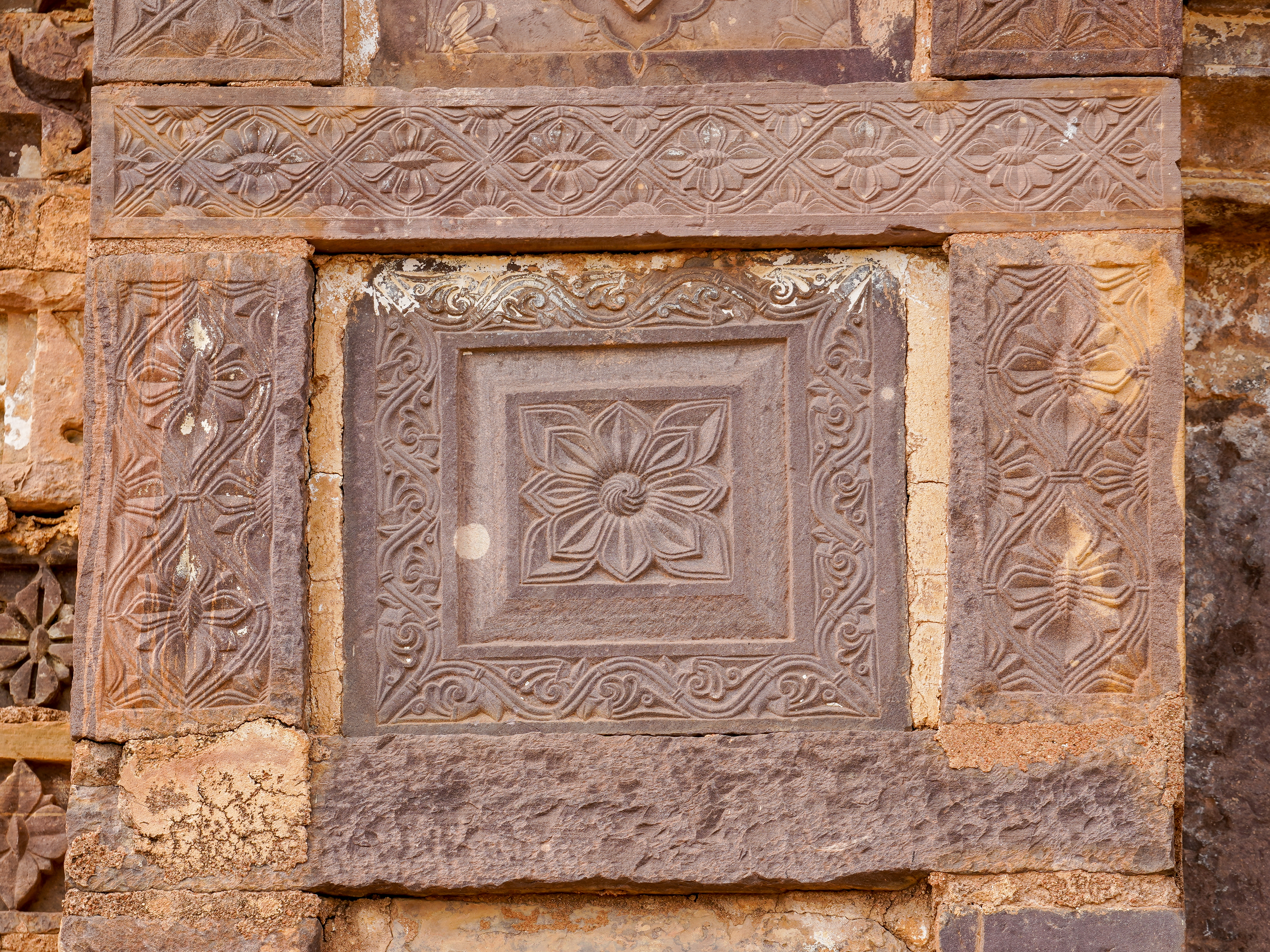
Ornamental tiles near he east entrance

The fort is open to the public. Entrance is free (January 2024). Fairs are held annually which attract many people. The carvings and stone artefacts, the natural beauty and the view of the Keoti Falls across the gorge behind the fort are attractions that draw visitors.

== Controversies ==
In 2016, the MP Government denotified the fort as a "protected heritage site" and transferred it to the Madhya Pradesh Tourism Board to be developed as a heritage hotel. In July 2021, the MP Tourism Board issued a tender for development of the Keoti Fort. However, it was reported that the fort had not been leased out and was falling into a state of disrepair. A local news report claims that the fort is being neglected by the administration and is frequented by petty criminals. These factors may deter tourists.

== Popular culture ==
The Hindi movie Bindhi aur Bandook (1972) was shot at Keoti Fort.

== Gallery ==
=== Exterior views ===
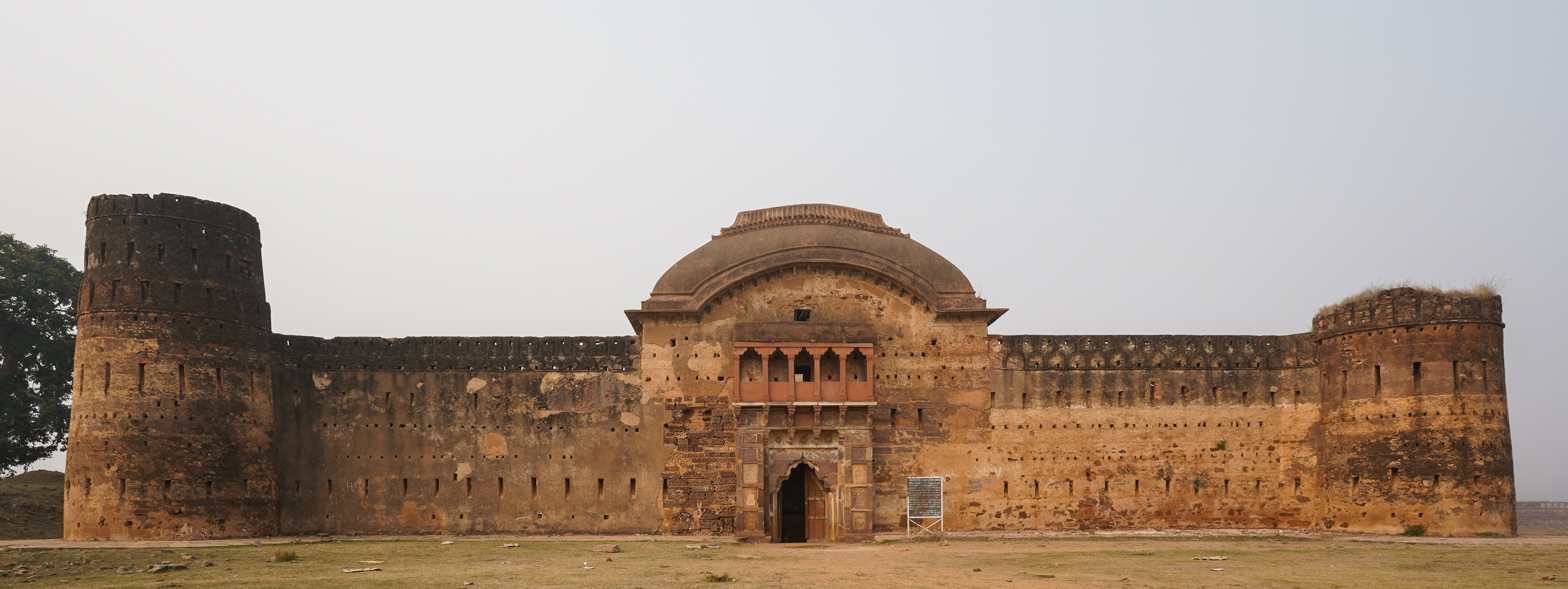
Front (east) facade

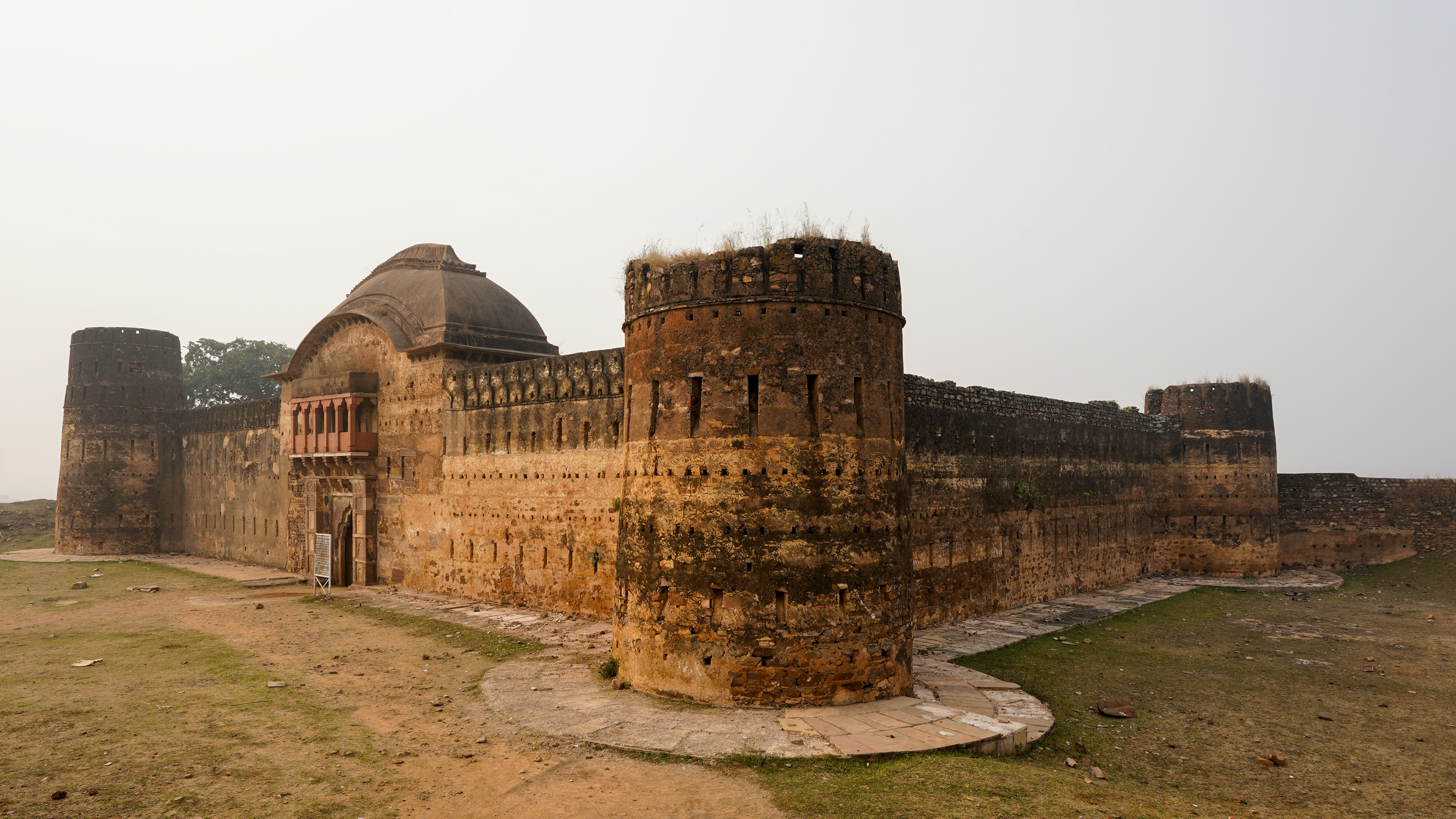
Front and north side

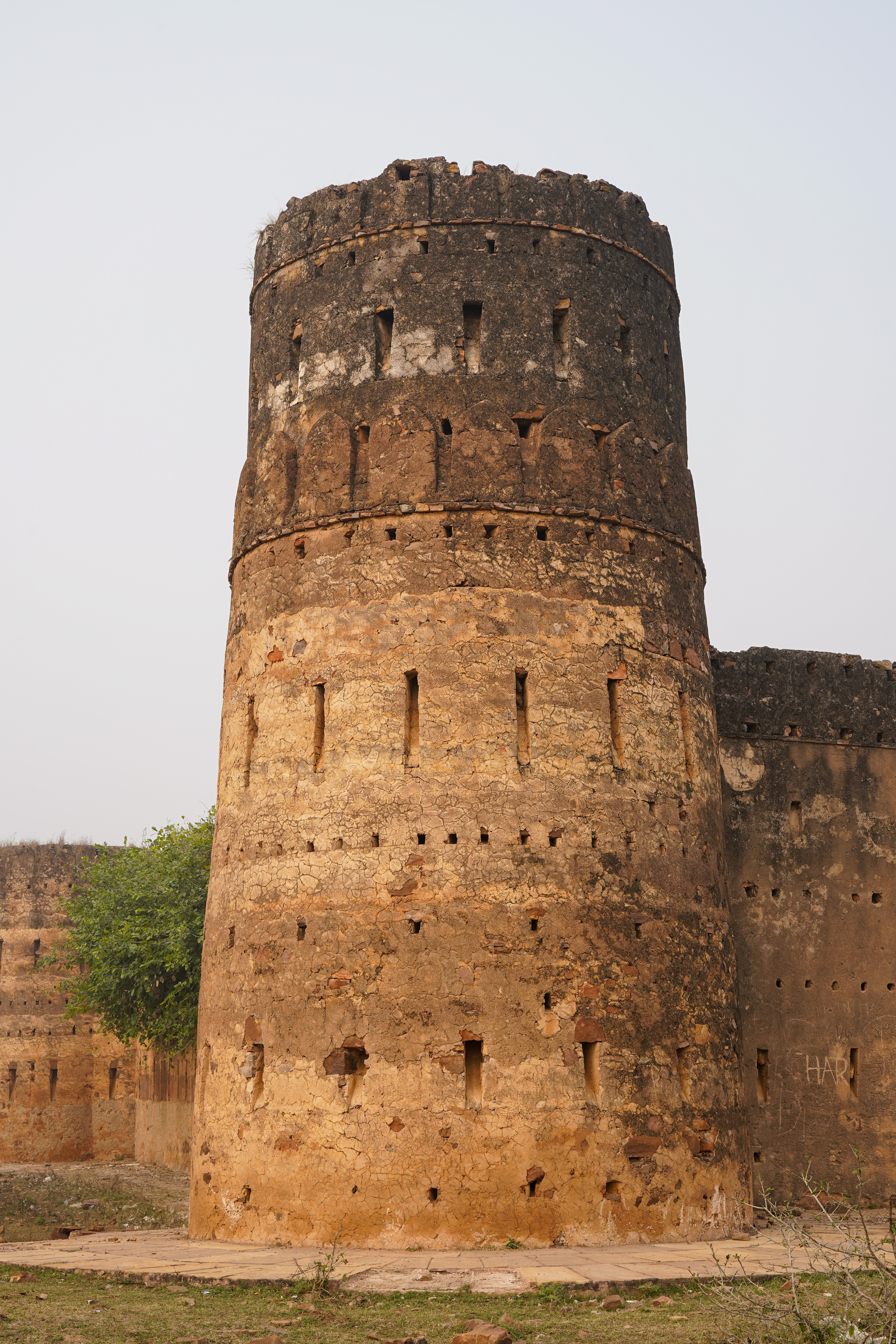
Tower on south-east corner

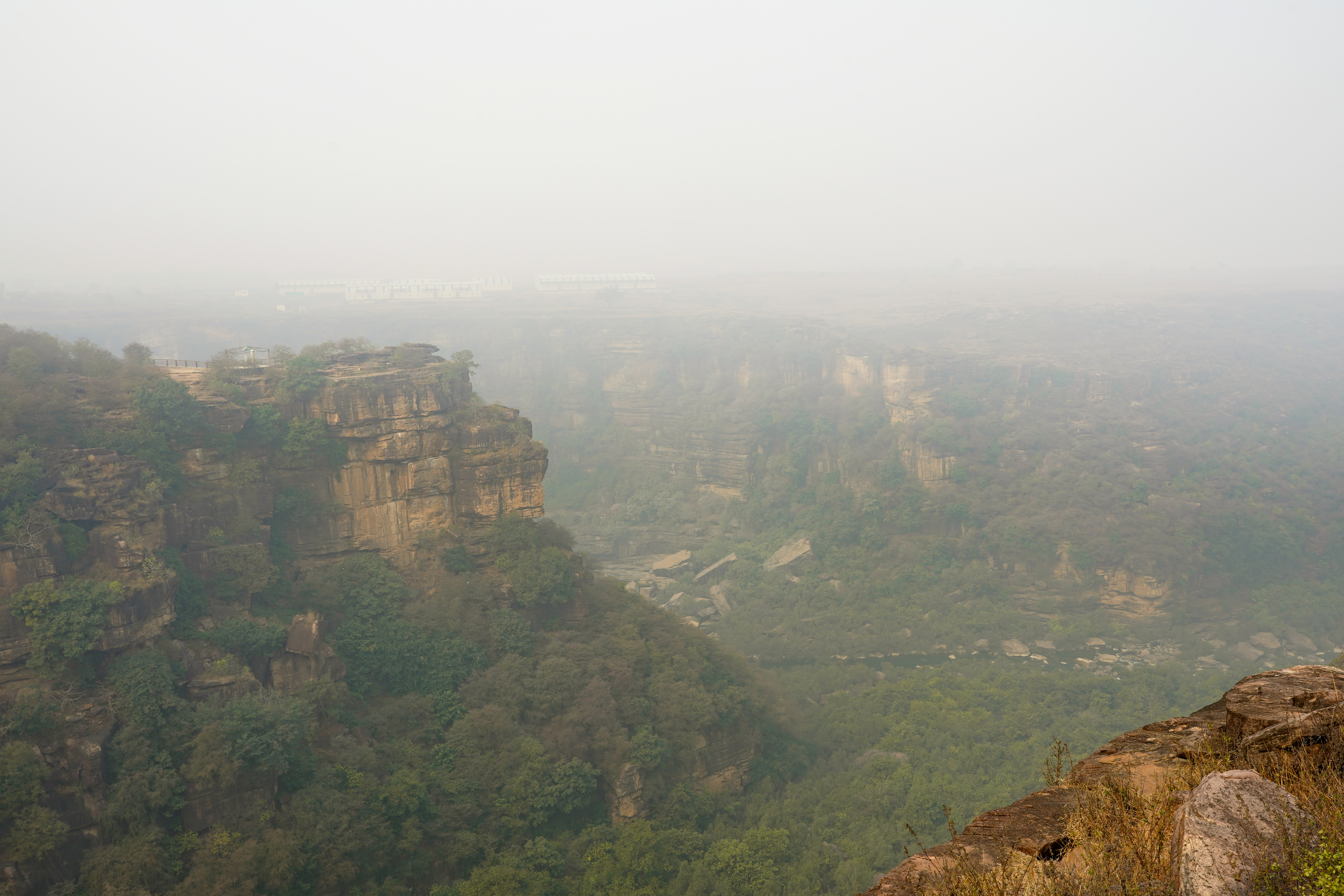
Gorge of the Mahana River behind the fort

=== Interior views ===
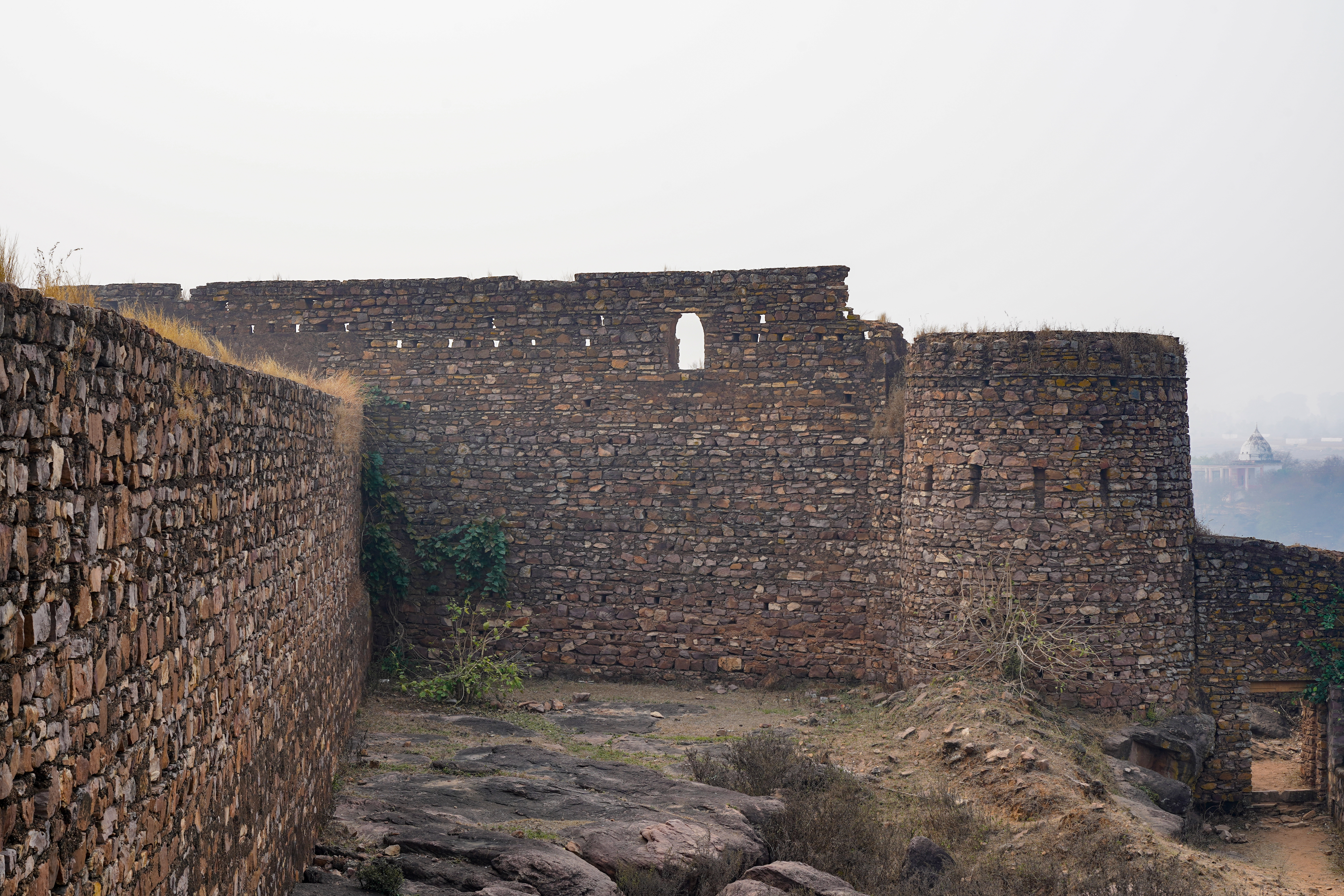
Inside south-west part, tower overlooking the ravine, loopholes near the top of the wall

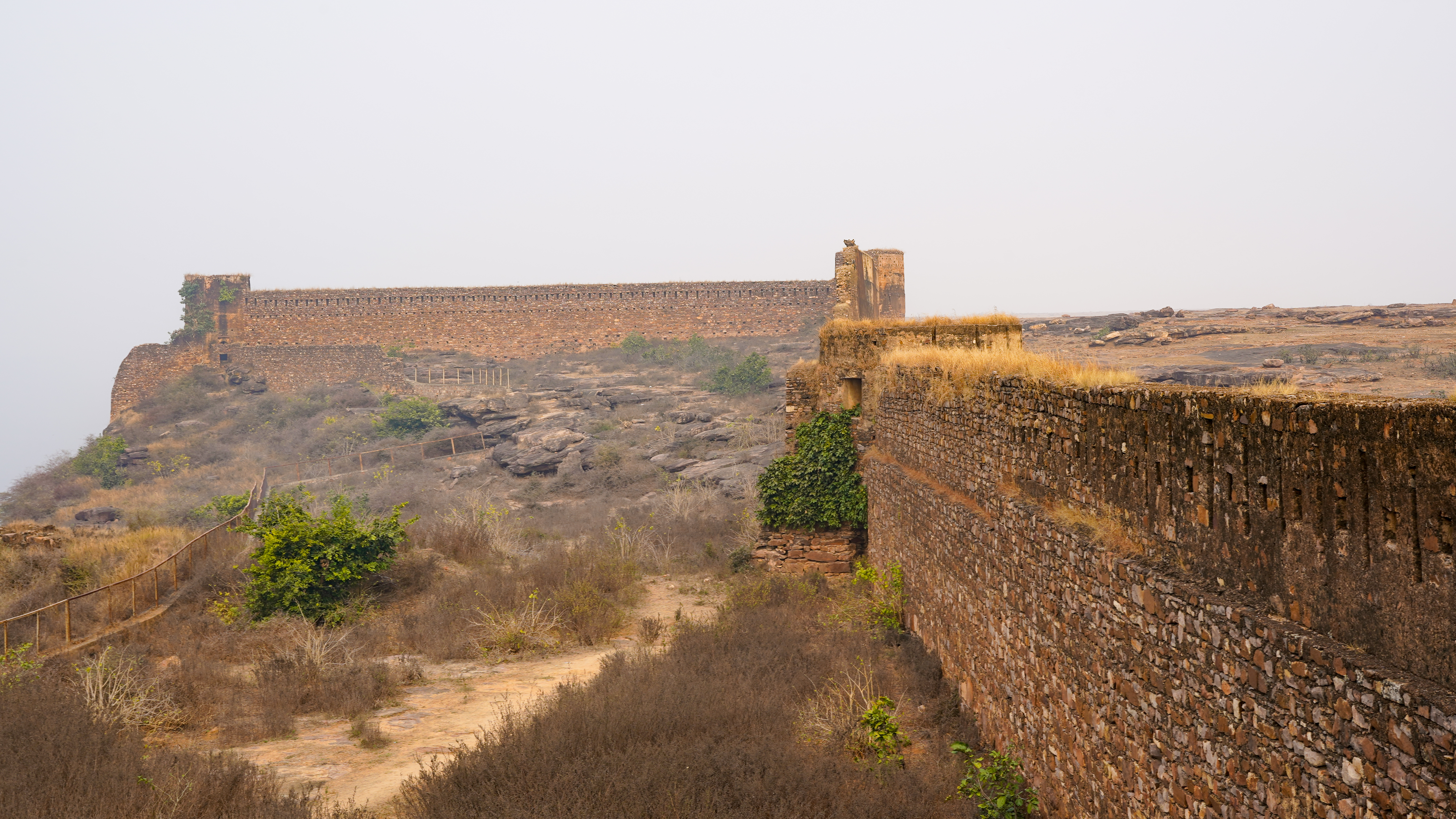
Northern inside of the fort: ravine on left, north wall in centre, east wall on right

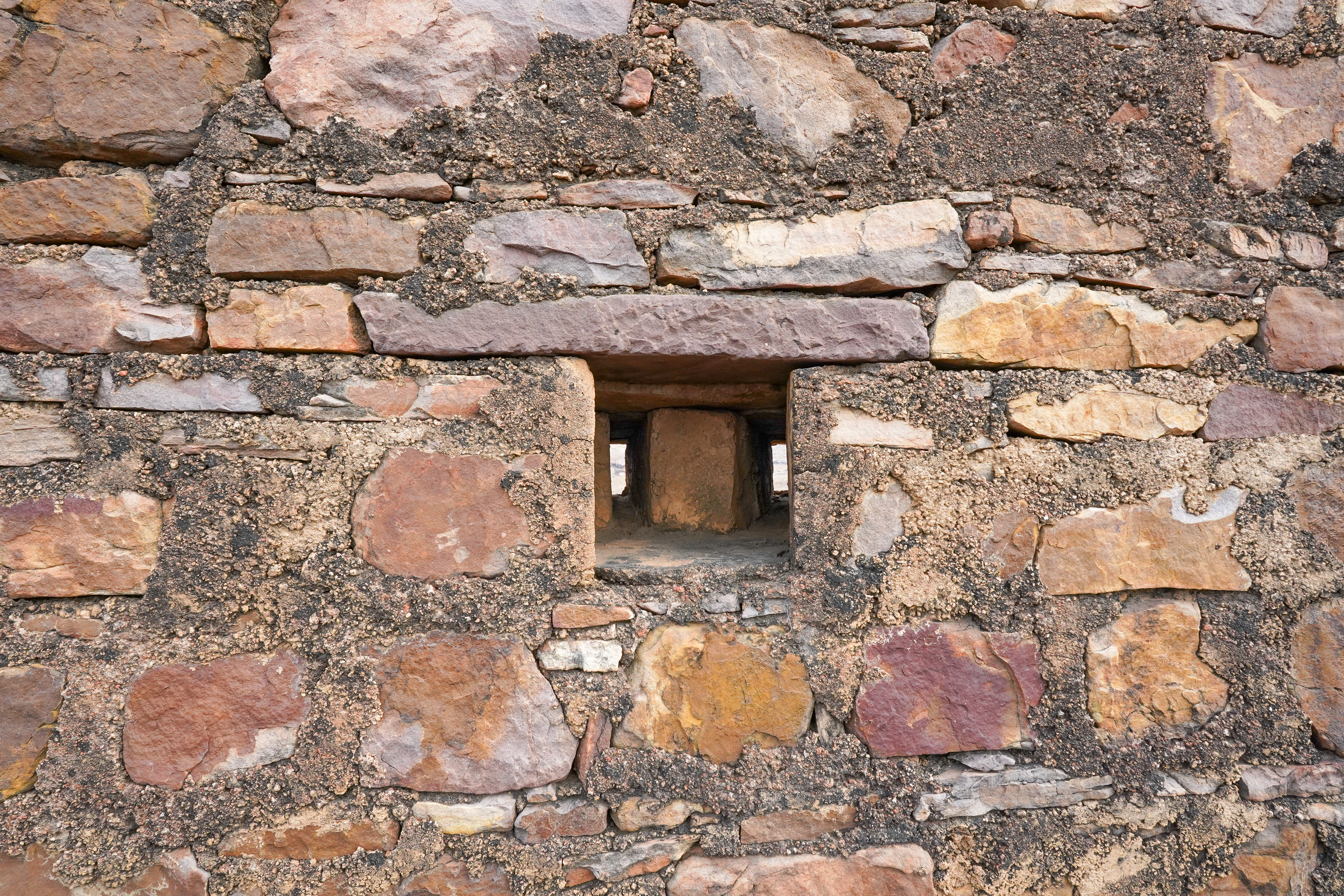
Loophole in outer wall for firearms

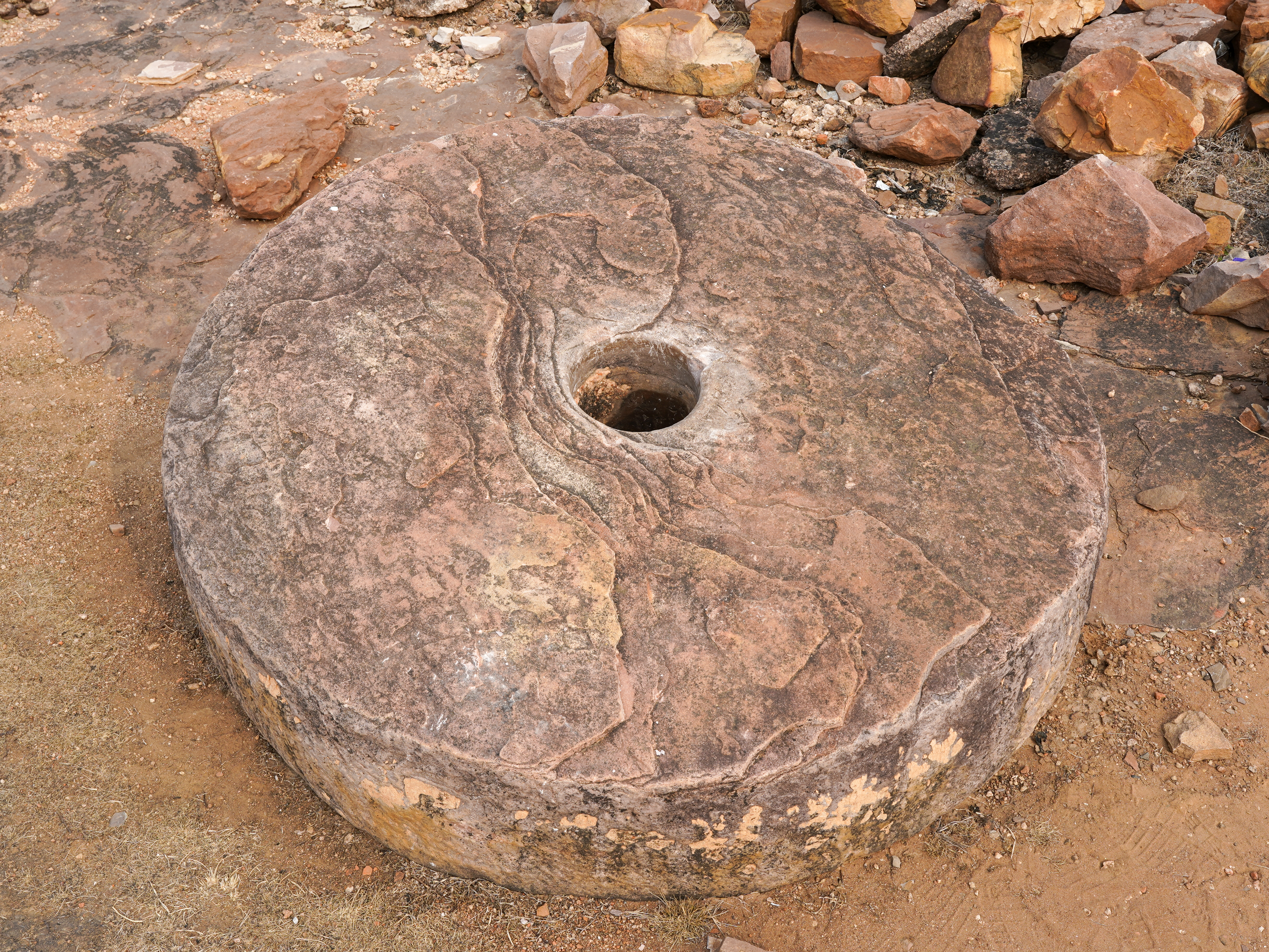
Grinding stone inside the fort

== See also ==
- List of forts in Madhya Pradesh
- Keoti Falls
