= Sirmaur, Madhya Pradesh =

Sirmaur
- Town
- Location in Madhya Pradesh, India Sirmaur (India)
- Coordinates: 24.85°N 81.38°E
- Country: India
- State: Madhya Pradesh
- District: Rewa
- Elevation: 291 m (955 ft)

Population (2001)
  - Total: 10,938

Languages
  - Official: Hindi
- Time zone: UTC+5:30 (IST)
- Postal code: 486448
- ISO 3166 code: IN-MP
- Vehicle registration: MP

Sirmaur is a town and a nagar panchayat in Rewa district in the Indian state of Madhya Pradesh. It is about 42 kilometers from Rewa.

== Geography ==
Sirmaur is located at 24.85°N 81.38°E. It has an average elevation of 291 metres (954 feet).

The Rewa Plateau covers the Huzur, Sirmaur, and Mauganj tehsils of Rewa district. The height decreases from south to north.

Significant waterfalls on the Tamsa or Tons and its tributaries, as they come down from the Rewa Plateau, are: Chachai Falls (127m) on the Bihad River, a tributary of the Tamsa, the Keoti Falls (98m) on the Mahana River, a tributary of the Tamsa, Odda Falls (145m) on the Odda River, a tributary of the Belah River, which is itself a tributary of the Tamsa, and Purwa Falls (70m) on the Tamsa or Tons.

== Demographics ==
As of 2001 India census, Sirmaur had a population of 10,938. Males constitute 54% of the population and females 46%. Sirmaur has an average literacy rate of 60%, higher than the national average of 59.5%: male literacy is 70%, and female literacy is 49%. In Sirmaur, 15% of the population is under 6 years of age.

== Transport ==
By air

Nearest airport in Prayagraj, Uttar Pradesh.

By bus

Bus stand available in the city bus stand Sirmaur.

== See also ==
- Sirmour (Vidhan Sabha constituency)
