= List of forts in Madhya Pradesh =

List of forts in Madhya Pradesh state in India

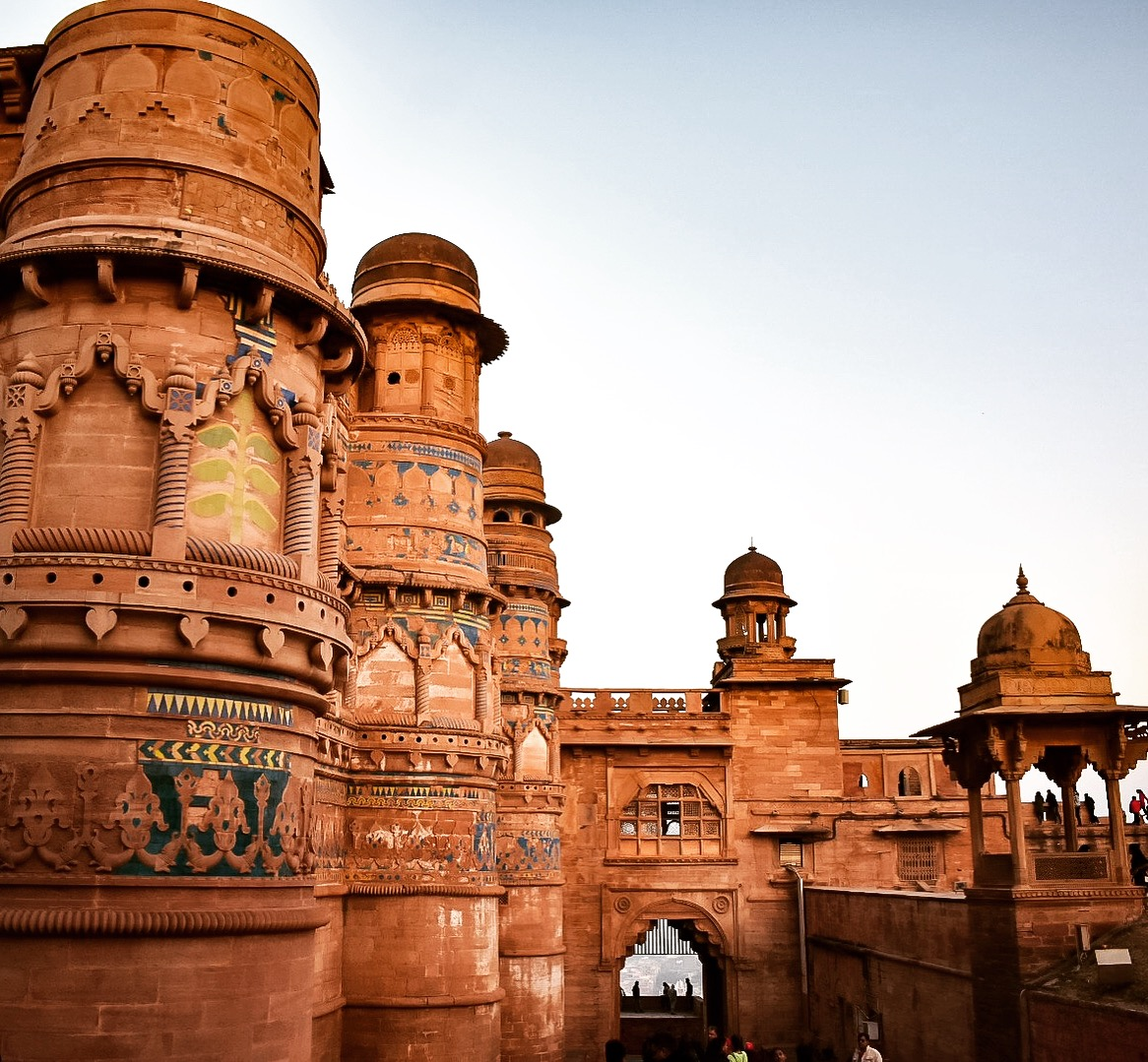
Gwalior fort

ater fort Bhind

- Ahilya Fort, Khargone
- Ajaigarh Fort, Panna
- Asirgarh Fort, Burhanpur
- Bajrangarh Fort, Guna
- Bandhavgarh Fort, Umariya
- Chanderi fort, Ashoknagar
- Champavati Fort, Guna
- Dhar Fort, Dhar
- Garh Kundar, Niwari
- Ginnorgarh, Bhopal
- Gohad Fort, Bhind
- Gwalior Fort, Gwalior
- Hinglajgarh, Mandsaur
- Keoti Fort, Rewa
- Madan Mahal, Jabalpur
- Mandsaur Fort, Mandsaur
- Mandu fort complex, Dhar
- Narwar Fort, Shivpuri
- Orchha Fort, Niwari
- Raisen Fort, Raisen
- Sabalgarh Fort, Morena
- Utila Fort, Gwalior
- Rewa Fort, Rewa
- Rahatgarh Fort, Sagar
