= Sirmaur =

Sirmaur may refer to the following in India:

- Sirmaur district, a district in Himachal Pradesh
  - Sirmauri language, a Western Pahari (Indo-Aryan) language spoken in the district
- Sirmur State, a former princely state covering the present-day district
- Sirmaur, Rewa, a town in Madhya Pradesh
