= Rewa division =

Administrative division of Madhya Pradesh, India

Coordinates: 24.53°N 81.3°E

Map of Rewa Division

Rewa Division is an administrative geographical unit of Madhya Pradesh state of India situated in the northeast part of state bordering with Uttar Pradesh, Chhattisgarh and Baghelkhand region of Madhya Pradesh. Rewa is the administrative headquarters of the division. As of 2024, the division consists of districts of Rewa, Satna, Sidhi, Singrauli, Mauganj and Maihar. The division forms a part of the Baghelkhand region of Madhya Pradesh. The divisional headquarters are in the Kothi Compound area of Rewa.

== District in Rewa Division ==
1. Rewa District
2. Satna District
3. Sidhi District
4. Singrauli District
5. Mauganj District
6. Maihar district

== Top Cities of Rewa Division ==
- Satna
- Rewa
- Singrauli
- Sidhi
- Maihar
- Mauganj
- Chitrakoot
- Nagod
- Amarpatan
- Hanumana
- Teonthar
- Semaria
