= Chakghat =

- Town
- Location in Madhya Pradesh, India Chakghat (India)
- Coordinates: 25°1′29″N 81°44′15″E
- Country: India
- State: Madhya Pradesh
- District: Rewa

Population (2001)
  - Total: 9,103

Languages
  - Official: Hindi
- Time zone: UTC+5:30 (IST)
- ISO 3166 code: IN-MP
- Vehicle registration: MP

Chakghat is a town and a nagar panchayat in Teonthar Block Rewa district in the state of Madhya Pradesh, India.

== Geography ==
Chakghat is located on 25°1′29″N 81°44′15″E. It has an average elevation of 305 metres (1,000 feet).

The Tamsa River flows through the middle of the city.

== Demographics ==
As of 2001 India census, Chakghat NP had a population of 18,000. Males constitute 43% of the population and females 57%. 18% of the population is under 6 years of age.

== Education ==
Government Boys Higher Secondary School Chakghat was established in 1965 and managed by the Department of Education.

Government Girls Higher Secondary School Chakghat was established in 1982 and managed by the Department of Education.

Nehru Smarak College Chakghat was established in 1965.

Chakghat city is an educational hub in this area. Ten Private schools in chakghat and three degree college and one pharmacy college.

== Notable people ==
- Ramakant Tiwari, MP Government Minister

== Transport ==
By bus

Bus stand available in the city bus stand chakghat.

By Train

Nearest Railway Station in Shankargarh, Uttar Pradesh.

By air

Nearest Airport in Prayagraj, Uttar Pradesh.
