= Agdal, Rewa =

Agdal
- Village
- Interactive map of Agdal
- Coordinates: 24.5087°N 81.2080°E
- Country: India
- State: Madhya Pradesh
- District: Rewa

Agdal is a village in Rewa district of the Madhya Pradesh state of India.
