= Tamsa River =

River in India

Location
- Country: India
- State: Madhya Pradesh, Uttar Pradesh

Physical characteristics
- Source
  - location: Maihar tehsil, Maihar district, Kaimur Range, Madhya Pradesh
  - elevation: 610 m (2,000 ft)
- Mouth: Ganges
  - location: About 30 km SE of Prayagraj
  - coordinates: 25°16′31″N 82°04′59″E
- Length: 264 km (164 mi)
- Basin size: 16,860 km^{2} (6,510 sq mi)

The Tamsa River or the Tons River is a major tributary of the Ganges flowing through the Indian states of Madhya Pradesh and Uttar Pradesh.

== Course ==
The Tamsa rises in a tank at Tamakund in the Kaimur Range at an elevation of 610 metres (2,000 ft) in the Maihar district. Then it flows through the fertile districts of Maihar and Rewa. At the edge of the Purwa plateau, the Tamsa and its tributaries form many waterfalls. The river receives the Belan in UP and joins the Ganges at the town of Sirsa, just under 34 kilometres (21 mi) downstream of the confluence of the Ganges and Yamuna. The total length of the river is 264 kilometres (164 mi). It has a total drainage area of 16,860 square kilometres (6,510 sq mi).

While descending through the Rewa Plateau and draining northwards, the Tamsa makes a vertical fall of 70m known as Purwa Falls. Some of the more notable waterfalls on the tributaries of the Tamsa River, as they come down from the Rewa Plateau, are Chachai Falls (127m) on the Beehar River, a tributary of the Tamsa; the Keoti Falls (98m) on the Mahana River, a tributary of the Tamsa; and Odda Falls (145m) on the Odda River, a tributary of the Belan River, which is itself a tributary of the Tamsa.

== Significance ==
This river bears significance to Hindus due to its identification with the river where Rama spent his first night during his fourteen years of forest exile, according to the Ramayana. When Rama left Ayodhya, people followed him, and were not ready to return to their homes. In the evening, Rama, Lakshmana, and Sita and all the people reached the banks of the Tamsa. Rama and everyone agreed to spend the night at the banks of the Tamsa river and continue the journey the next morning. However, Rama left behind the people as they slept and continued his journey further.

The ashrama of sage Valmiki is regarded to have been located at the banks of the Tamsa river. When Sita was left behind by Rama after her departure from Ayodhya, she is said to have come to the banks of the Tamsa river some 15 km away from the city, where she met Valmiki, who requested Sita to live in his ashrama. Sita is believed to have spent most of her remaining life here, and her twin sons Lava and Kusha received education and trained in military skills under Valmiki's tutelage.

Also on the banks of the Tamsa was the ashrama of Bharadvaja, mentioned in the Valmiki Ramayana; it is here that on seeing the plight of a bird couple, Valmiki composed his first shloka.

== Towns And villages situated on Tamsa River ==
- Maihar
- Pathrahta
- Cheruia
- Pipraon
- Malpar
- Chakghat
- Meja
- Teonthar
- Mau
- Ballia
- Azamgarh
- Ambedkar Nagar district
- Mori
