= Purwa Falls =

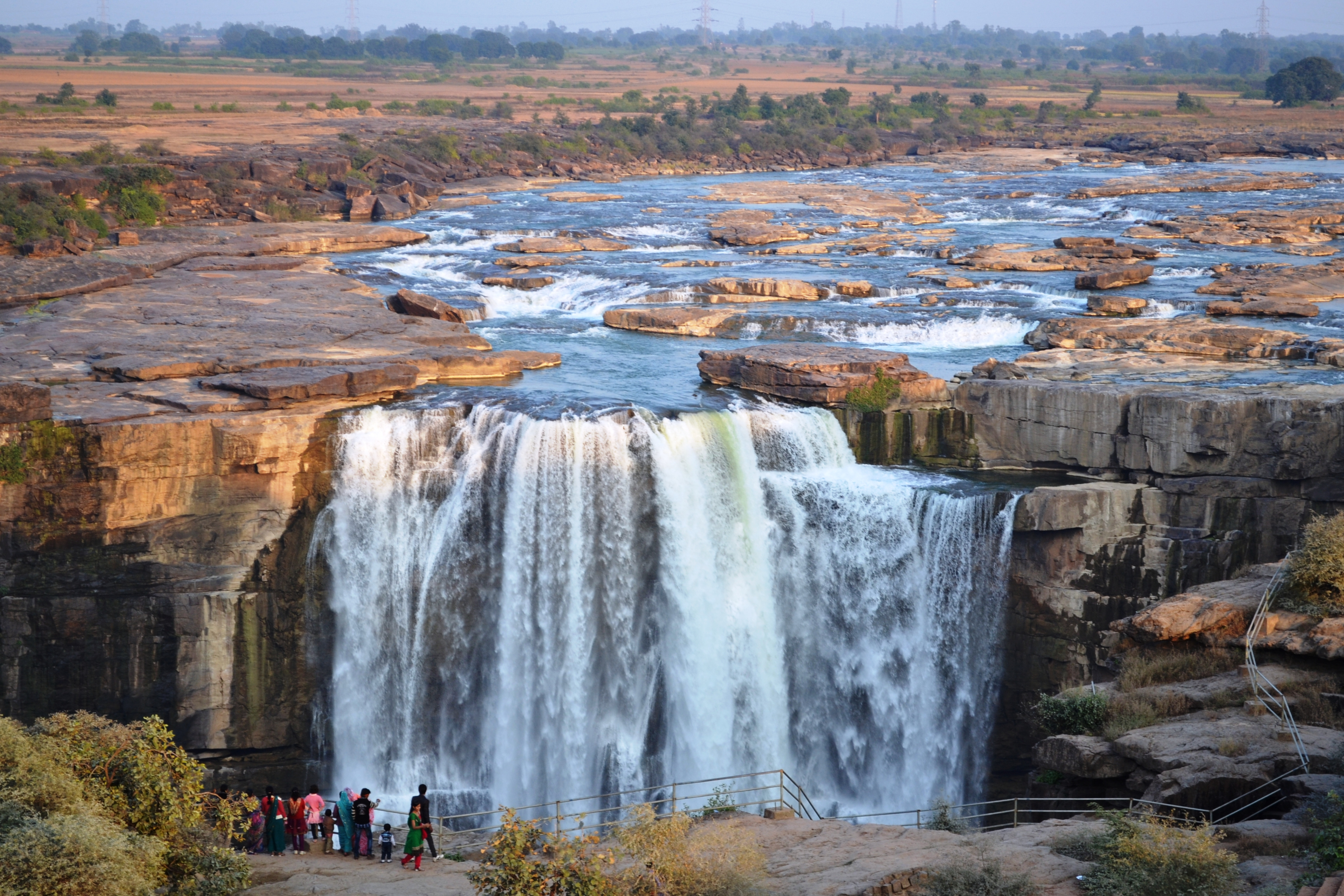
- Interactive map of Purwa Falls
- Location: Rewa district, Madhya Pradesh, India
- Coordinates: 24.783°N 81.265°E
- Total height: 70 metres (230 ft)
- Watercourse: Tamasa or Tons

The Purwa Falls is a waterfall on the Tamsa River in Rewa district in the Indian state of Madhya Pradesh. It is located in Semariya, a town in Rewa district, near Basavan Mama, a sacred and tourist place.

== The falls ==
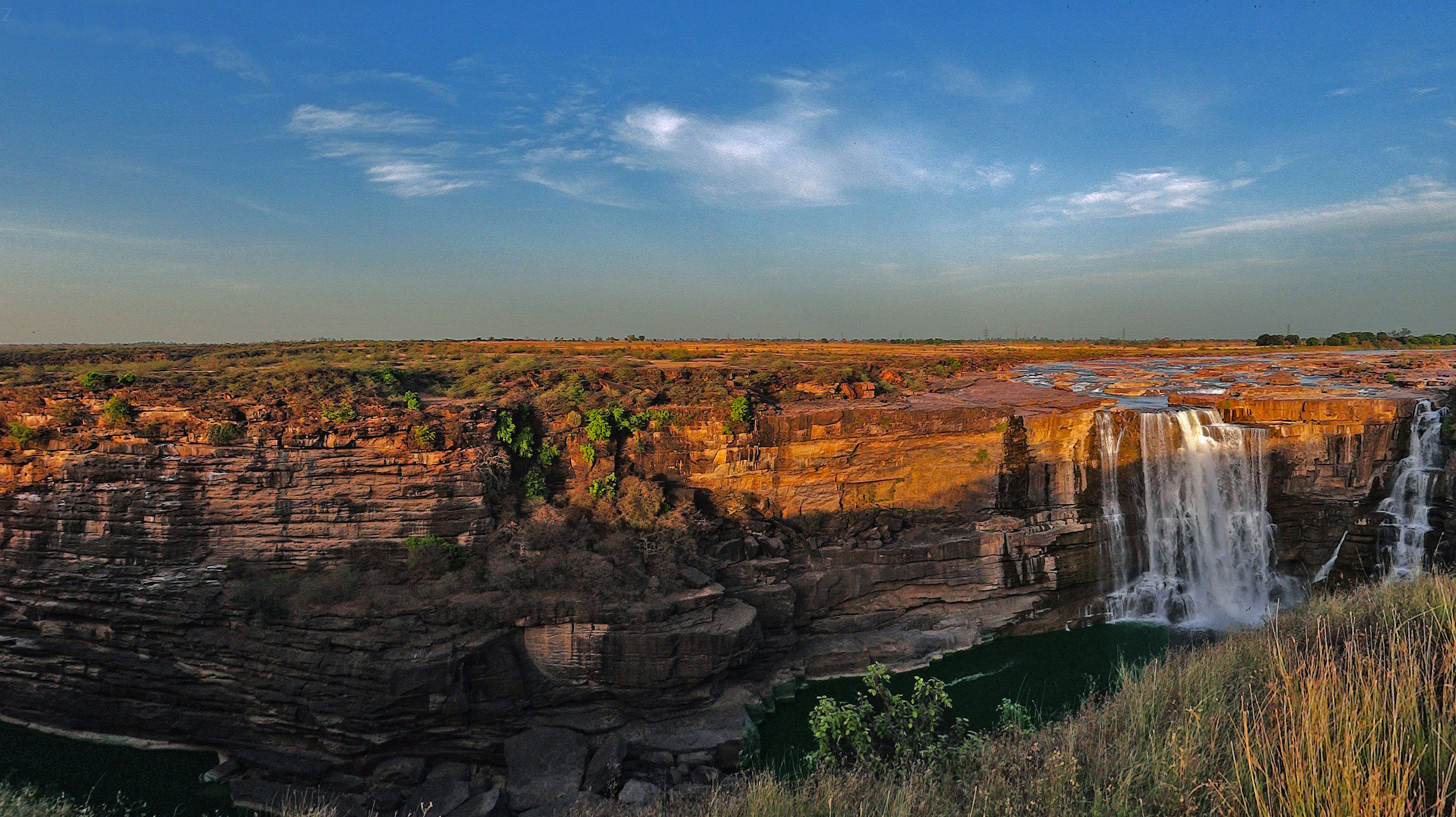
Purva Falls

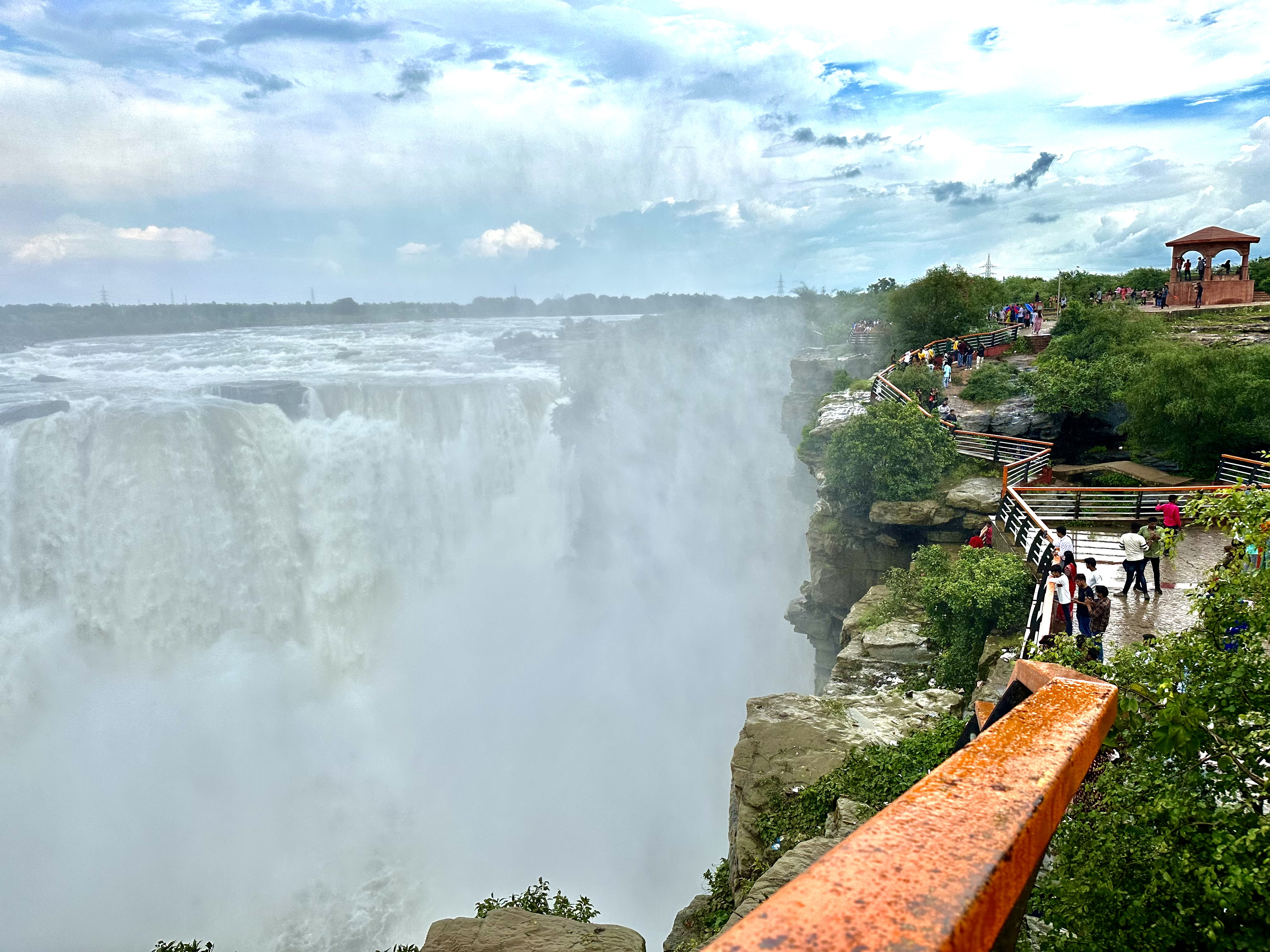
Purva Falls

After appearing from a pond in the Maihar district and While descending through the Rewa Plateau and draining northwards, the Tamsa makes a vertical fall of 70 metres (230 ft), creating the Purwa Falls.

The Purwa Falls is an example of a nick point caused by rejuvenation. Knick point, also called a nick point or simply nick, represents breaks in slopes in the longitudinal profile of a river caused by rejuvenation. The break in channel gradient allows water to fall vertically giving rise to a waterfall.

== See also ==
- List of waterfalls
- List of waterfalls in India
