= Keoti Falls =

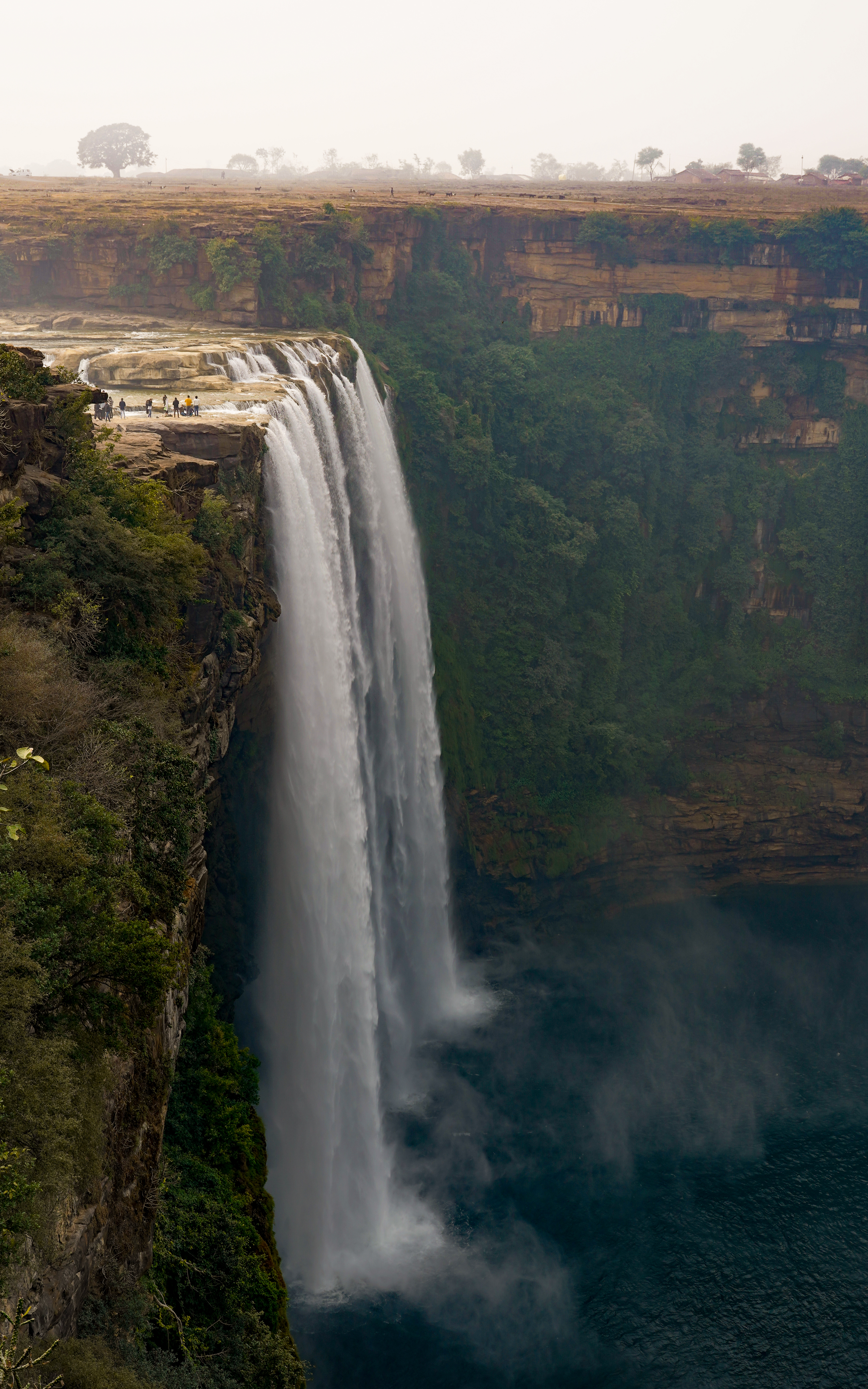
- Keoti Fall in Rewa district, Madhya Pradesh as on 15 August 2021
- Interactive map of Keoti Falls
- Location: Rewa district, Madhya Pradesh, India
- Coordinates: 24°48′58″N 81°27′11″E
- Type: Segmented
- Total height: 98 metres (322 ft)
- Number of drops: 1
- Watercourse: Mahana river, a tributary of Tamsa or Tons River

Keoti Falls (also spelt Kevti) is in Rewa district in the Indian state of Madhya Pradesh. It is the 24th highest waterfall in India.

== The Falls ==
The Keoti Falls is on the Mahana river, a tributary of Tamsa or Tons River as it comes down from the Rewa Plateau. It has a total height of 98 metres (322 ft). World Waterfall Database puts the height of the waterfall at 130 metres (430 ft). It is a segmented type waterfall with a single drop.

Knick point, also called a nick point or simply nick, represents breaks in slopes in the longitudinal profile of a river caused by rejuvenation. The break in channel gradient allows water to fall vertically giving rise to a waterfall. Keoti Falls is an example of a nick point caused by rejuvenation.

== Location ==
It is situated 46 kilometres (29 mi) from Rewa District, at the edge of the Chitrakoot Hills, a part of the Kaimur Range near Sirmour Constituency.

== See also ==
- List of waterfalls
- List of waterfalls in India
- List of waterfalls in India by height
- Keoti Fort
