= Chachai Falls =

Waterfall in India

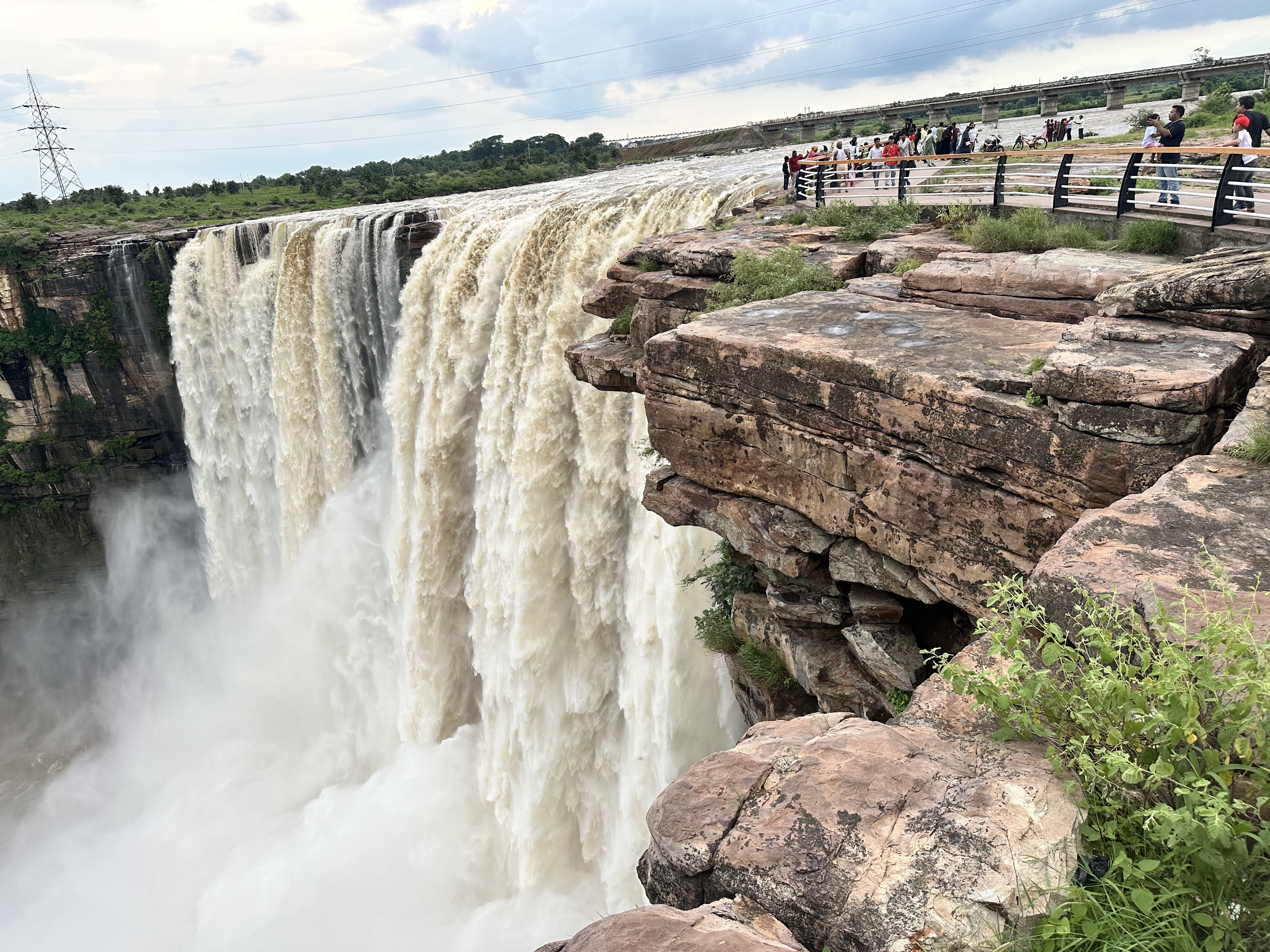
- Chachai Waterfall during monsoon
- Interactive map of Chachai Falls
- Location: Rewa district, Madhya Pradesh, India
- Coordinates: 24°47′31″N 81°18′10″E
- Type: segmented
- Total height: 130 metres (430 ft)
- Number of drops: 1
- Watercourse: Bihad River, a tributary of Tamsa or Tons River

Chachai Falls is in Rewa district in the Indian state of Madhya Pradesh. It is the 23rd highest waterfall in India.

== The Falls ==
The Chachai Falls is on the Bihad River, a tributary of Tamsa or Tons River as it comes down from the Rewa Plateau. It has a total height of 130 metres (430 ft).

Chachai Falls is an example of a nick point caused by rejuvenation. Knick point, also called a nick point or simply nick, represents breaks in slopes in the longitudinal profile of a river caused by rejuvenation. The break in channel gradient allows water to fall vertically giving rise to a waterfall.

== Location ==
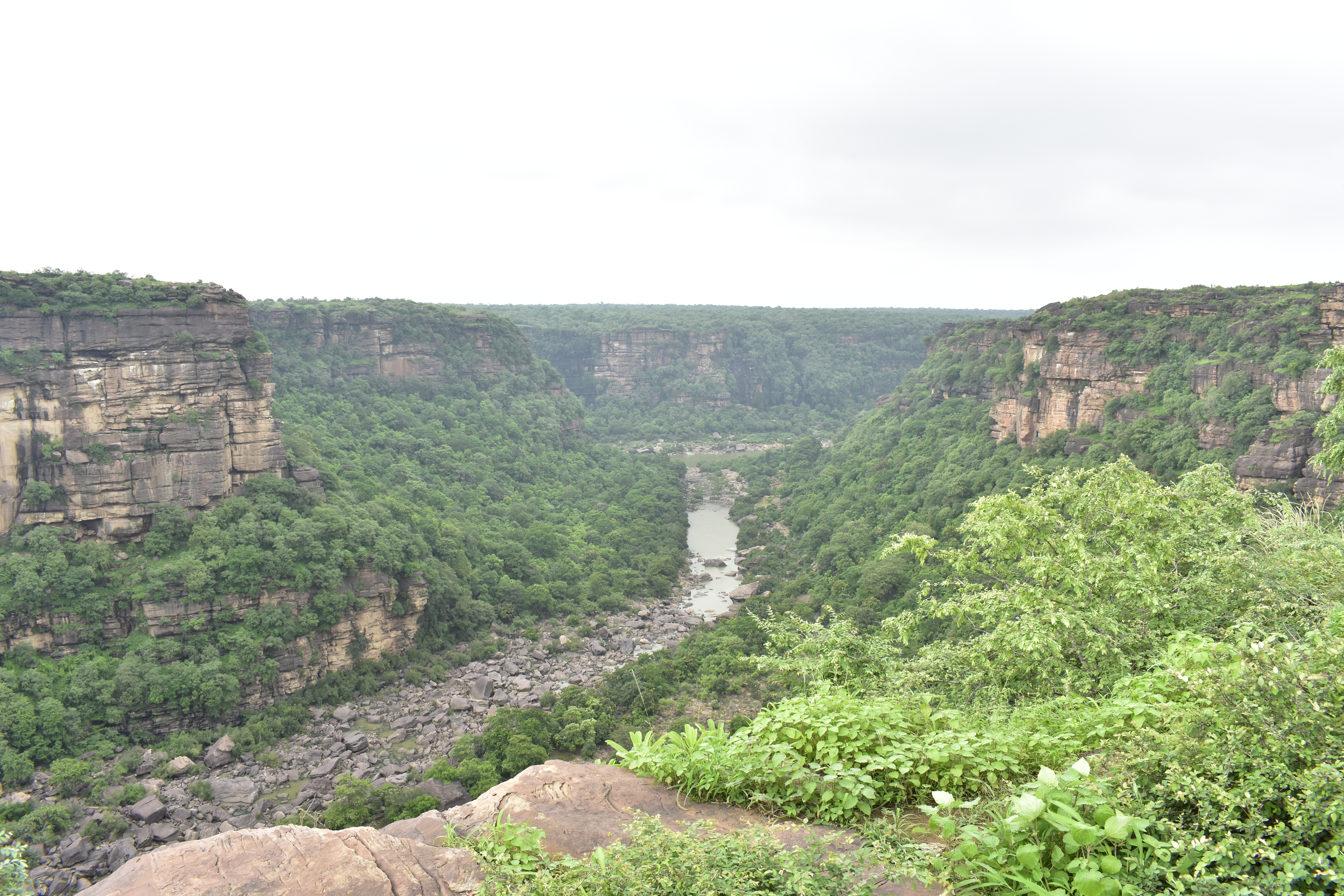
A view of Chachai Falls in Rewa

It is situated 46 kilometres (29 mi) from Rewa, at the edge of the Chitrakoot Hills, which are part of the Kaimur Range. The rail accessibility is from Semaria, at a distance of 10 kilometers from Chachai. These falls can easily be reached either from Rewa or Satna.

== See also ==
- List of waterfalls
- List of waterfalls in India
- List of waterfalls in India by height
