= Rewa Ultra Mega Solar =

Solar park in Madhya Pradesh, India

Rewa Ultra Mega Solar Power Project
- Country: India
- Location: Rewa district, Madhya Pradesh
- Coordinates: 24.4802°N 81.5744°E
- Status: Commissioned
- Commission date: 5 July 2018
- Construction cost: ₹4,500 crore (US$658 million)
- Owners: Madhya Pradesh Urja Vikas Nigam Limited; Solar Energy Corporation of India
- Operator: Rewa Ultra Mega Solar Limited (RUMSL)

Solar farm
- Type: Flat-panel PV
- Site resource: 5.0-5.5 kWh/m^{2} per day
- Site area: 1,590 acres (640 ha)

Power generation
- Units operational: 3 x 250 MW
- Nameplate capacity: 750 MW

Rewa Ultra Mega Solar is an operational ground mounted, grid-connected photovoltaic solar park spread over an area of 1,590 acres (6.4 km^{2}) in the Gurh tehsil of Rewa district of Madhya Pradesh, India. It started producing power in 2018 and reached its full capacity of 750MW in January 2020. The project was dedicated to the nation by the Prime Minister of India Shri Narendra Modi on July 10, 2020. It was the first solar project in India to break the grid parity barrier. It achieved a first-year tariff of INR 2.97/unit, while the previous record was INR 4.34/unit.

The project was commissioned by Rewa Ultra Mega Solar Limited, a joint venture between Madhya Pradesh UrjaVikas Nigam Limited and Solar Energy Corporation of India. The 750 MW capacity was auctioned in three packages of 250 MW each. RUMSL invited bids from solar power developers in January 2017. Twenty firms submitted bids, from which eighteen were shortlisted based on their financial and technical proposal to participate in the bidding process. The three winning bidders were Mahindra Renewables, Acme Solar, and Solenergi.

Rewa Solar Power Project has been awarded World Bank Group's President award for Innovation and Excellence. This recognition also highlights the contributions of Manu Srivastava, a 1991 Batch IAS officer, whose leadership was instrumental in the project's success.

It has been included in Prime Minister's Book of Innovation 2017.

About 24% of the park's produced energy goes to the Delhi Metro Rail Corporation, where it meets 60% of the daytime demand of the Delhi Metro.
