= Rewa Plateau =

Plateau in India

- रीवा पठार
- Location within Madhya Pradesh Location within India

Highest point
- Coordinates: 24°15′N 81°10′E

Geography
- Location: Rewa, Rewa, Madhya Pradesh, India

Geology
- Mountain type: Plateau

The Rewa Plateau covers a portion of Rewa district in the Indian state of Madhya Pradesh.

The Rewa Plateau lies between the Kaimur Range in the south and Vindhya Range or Binj Pahar in the north. To the north of the Binj Pahar are the alluvial plains known as Uprihar. The plateau covers the Huzur, Sirmaur and Mauganj tehsils of Rewa district. The height decreases from south to north. The Kaimur Range is more than 450 metres (1,480 ft). The alluvial plains of Teonthar are just around 100 metres (330 ft). A series of plateaux runs along the Kaimur Range. These fluvial plateaux, consists of a series of descending plateaux, starting with the Panna Plateau in the west, followed by Bhander Plateau and Rewa Plateau and ending with Rohtas Plateau in the east.

== Alluvium ==
The Ken valley separates the Rewa Plateau from the Satna Plateau. Because of the flatness they can also be called high plains. Only the southern part of the Rewa Plateau is hilly.

The Rewa plateau from Rehli in the southwest to Satna in the northeast is covered with alluvium of the Pleistocene and recent periods.

== Rivers and waterfalls ==
The plateau is drained by the Tamas or Tons and the Son and their tributaries. Tke Kaimur Range forms the watershed between the two rivers. Most of the rivers originate in the Kaimur Range.

Significant waterfalls on the Tamas or Tons and its tributaries, as they come down from the Rewa Plateau, are: Chachai Falls (127m) on the Bihad River, a tributary of the Tamas, the Keoti Falls (98m) on the Mahana River, a tributary of the Tamas, Bahuti Falls (145m) on the Odda River, a tributary of the Belah River, which is itself a tributary of the Tamas, and Purwa Falls (70m) on the Tamsa or Tons.
