= Rewa district =

City and district of Madhya Pradesh in India

- District of Madhya Pradesh
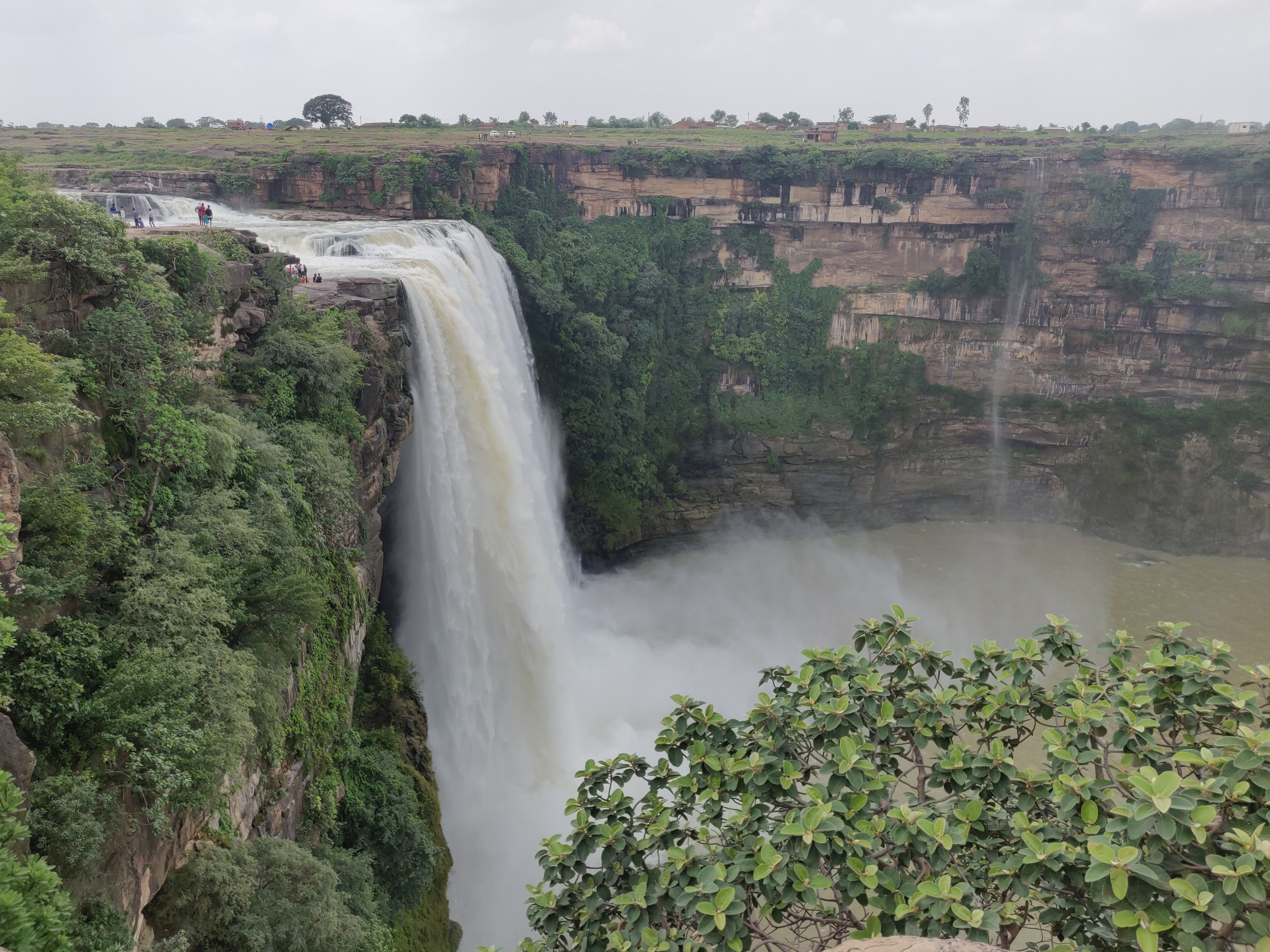
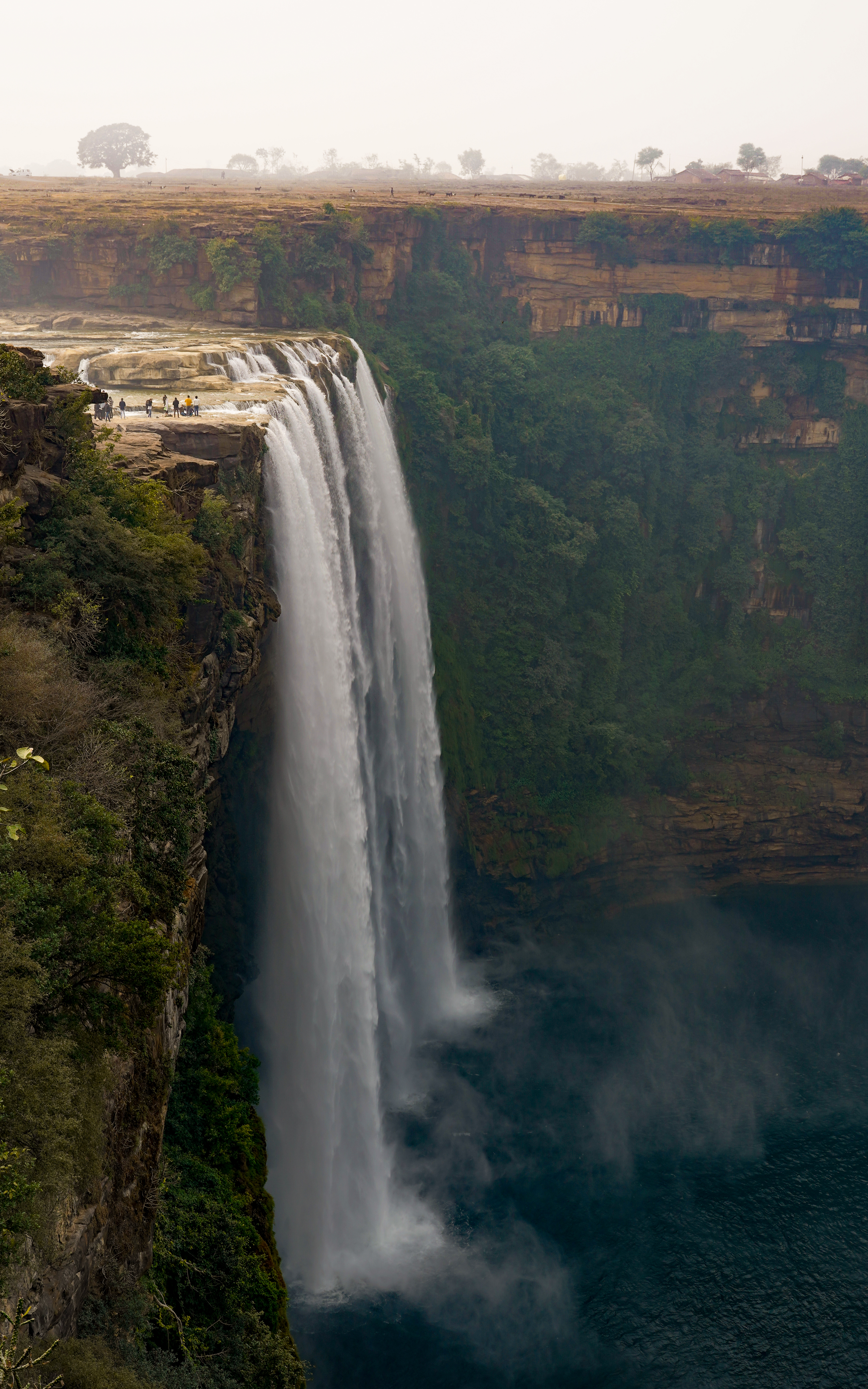
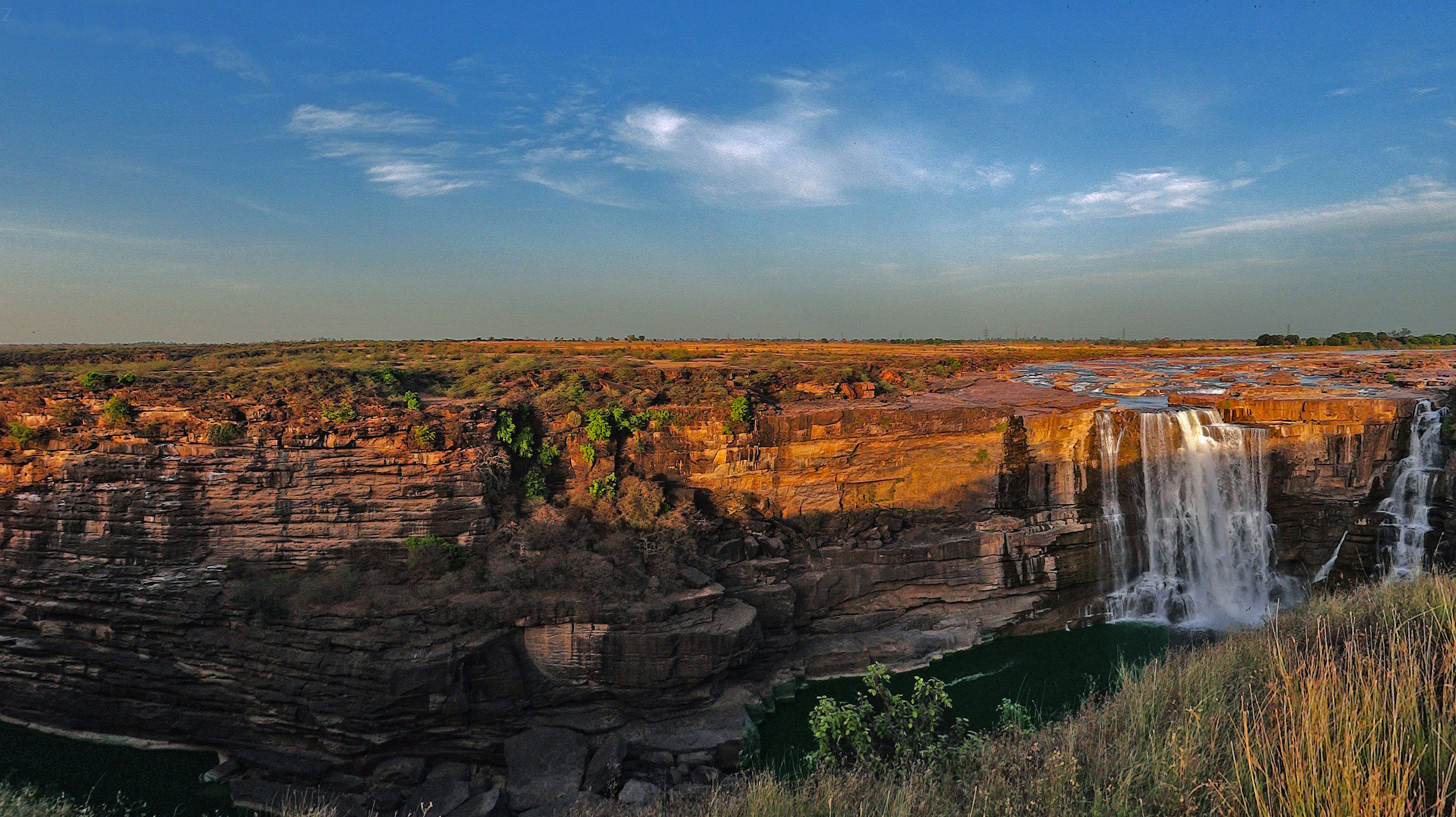
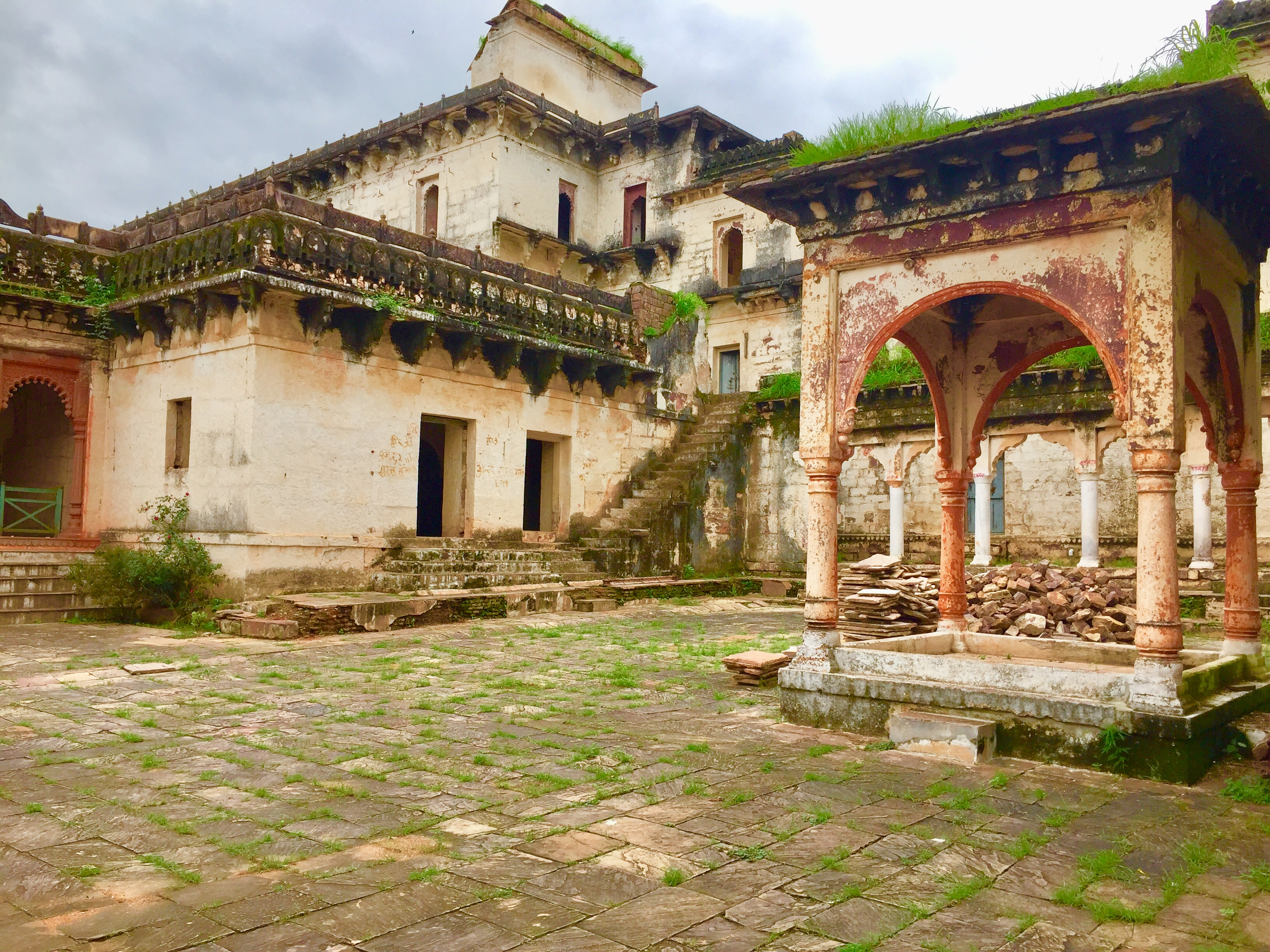
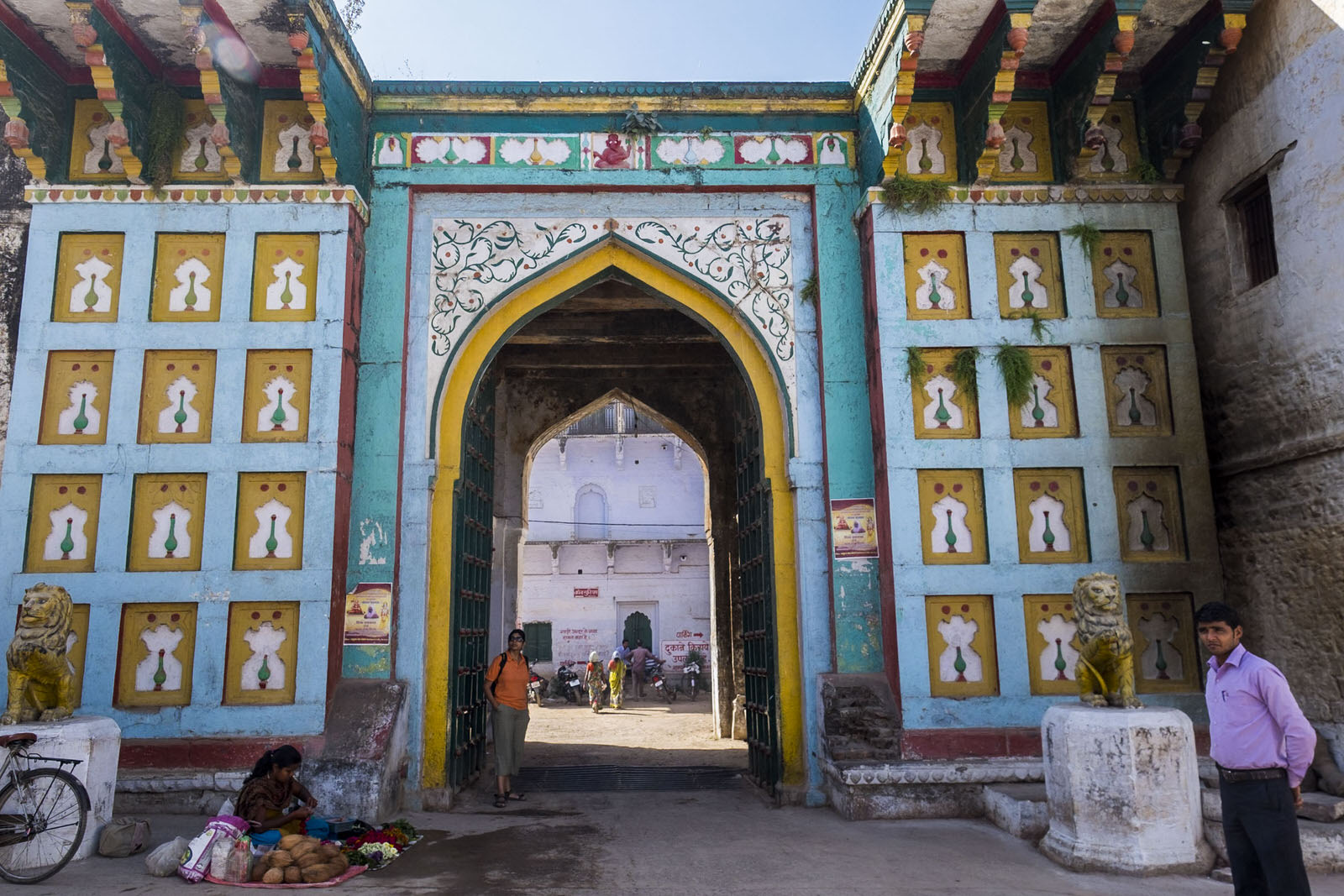
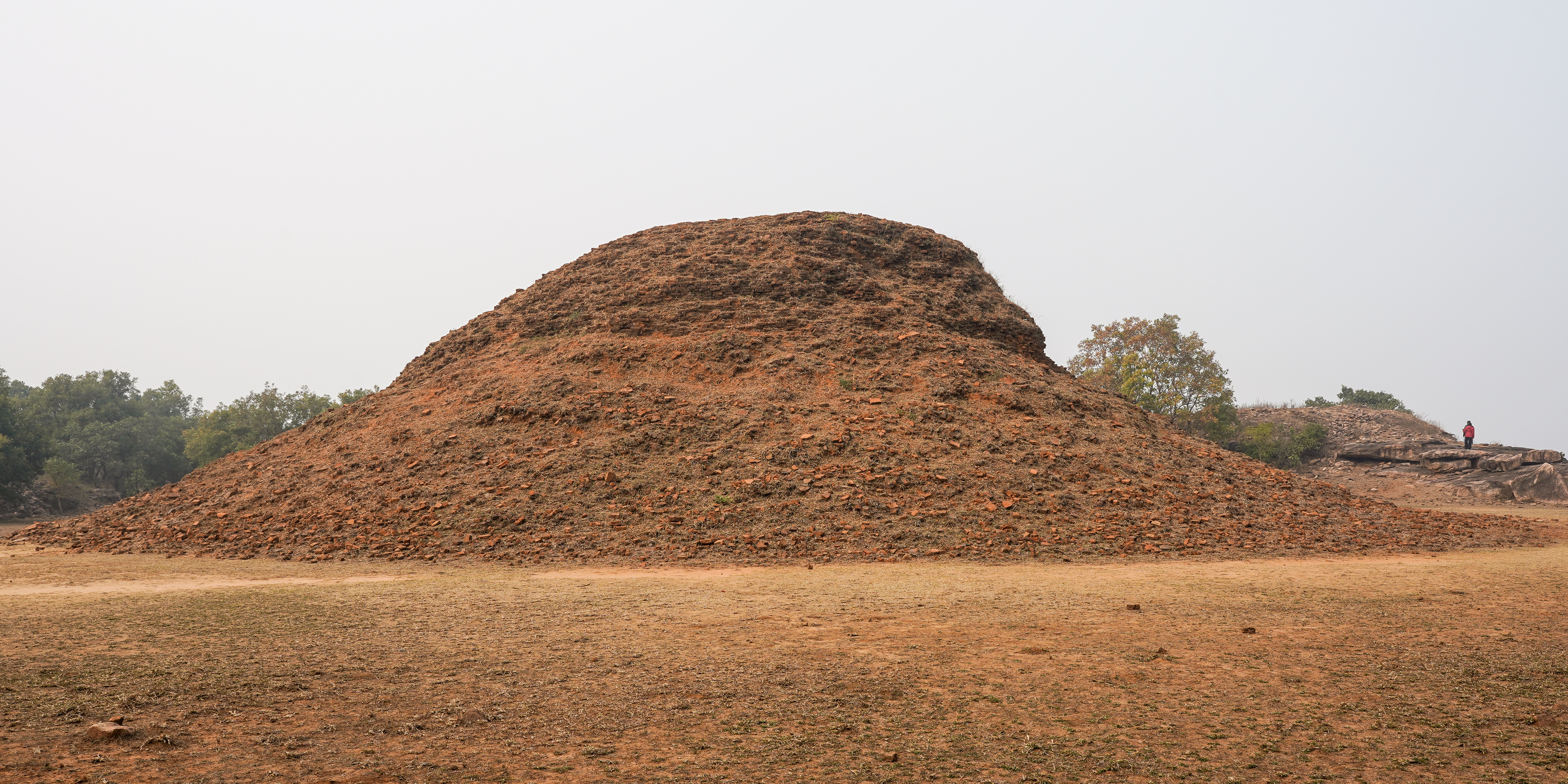
- Clockwise from top-left: Keoti Falls, Bahuti Falls in Mauganj, Purwa Falls in Semaria, Rewa fort, Govindgarh Palace, Deur Kothar

- Location of Rewa district in Madhya Pradesh
- Coordinates (Rewa, India): 24.55°N 81.29°E
- Country: India
- State: Madhya Pradesh
- Division: Rewa
- Headquarters: Rewa

Government
  - District Collector: Pratibha Pal
  - Lok Sabha constituencies: Rewa

Area
  - Total: 6,240 km^{2} (2,410 sq mi)

Population (2011)
  - Total: 2,365,106
  - Density: 379/km^{2} (982/sq mi)

Demographics
  - Literacy: 73.42 per cent
  - Sex ratio: 930
- Time zone: UTC+05:30 (IST)
- Major highways: NH 7, NH 27, NH 75
- Average annual precipitation: normal mm
- Website: rewa.nic.in

Rewa district (Hindi pronunciation: [ɾiːʋaː]) is a district in Madhya Pradesh state in northeastern Madhya Pradesh in central India. The city of Rewa is the district headquarter. Rewa is sometimes called the "Land of White Tigers", as the first White Tiger was discovered here in 1951 by the Maharaja of the province, Martand Singh, in the nearby jungle of Govindgarh. Rewa was the capital city of a former state, Vindhya Pradesh.

== Geography ==
Rewa lies between 24° 18' and 25° 12' north latitudes and 81° 2' and 82° 18’. The district is bounded on the north by Uttar Pradesh, on the east and southeast by Sidhi, on the south by Shahdol, and on the west by Satna. Rewa district is part of Rewa Division and has an area of 6,240 km^{2}.

The Huzur, Sirmour and Mauganj tehsils lie between the Kaimur Range in the south, and the Binjh pahar in the north, and form what is known as the Rewa plateau or uprihar. To the north lies the Teonther tehsil which is quite different in its physical and other features from the plateau tehsils. The Rewa plateau decreases in height from south to north. In the south, the Kaimur Range rises to more than 450 meters above sea level, whereas the alluvial plain of Teonthor is just 100 meters above sea level. In the eastern side of Rewa some small cities and towns are there like Manikwar, Mauganj, Mangawan, Hanumana.

The district has a varied terrain that includes alluvial plains, hills, ravines, scarp, rivers, and water-falls. The rain-water of the district flows out along two tributary rivers of the Ganges, the Tons or Tamas and the Son. The Bichiya River flows through the heart of Rewa city.

The Tamsa or Tons and its tributaries form waterfalls as they descend from the Rewa Plateau, including: the Chachai Falls (127m) on the Bihar River, a tributary of the Tamsa, the Keoti Falls (98m) on the Mahana River, a tributary of the Tamsa, the Odda Falls (145m) on the Odda River, a tributary of the Belah River, which is itself a tributary of the Tamsa, Bahuti fall on Chataniha river beside Misirgawan village, and the Purwa Falls (70m) on the Tamsa or Tons.

== History ==
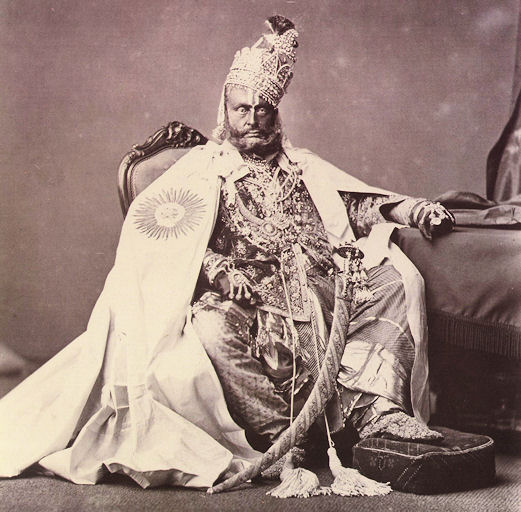
The Maharaja of Rewa, Raghuraj Singh Ju Deo Bahadur in 1877

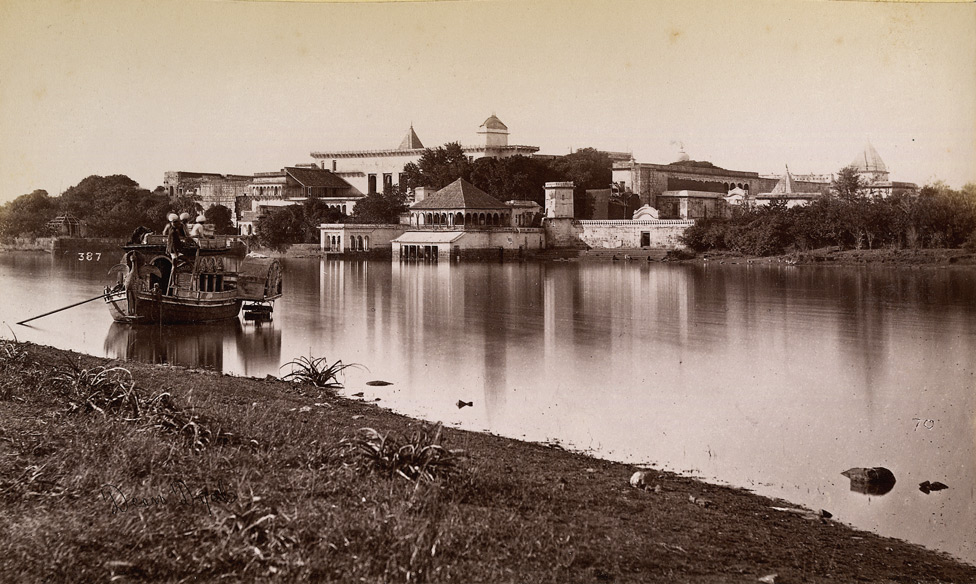
The Govindgarh palace of the Maharaja of Rewa in 1882

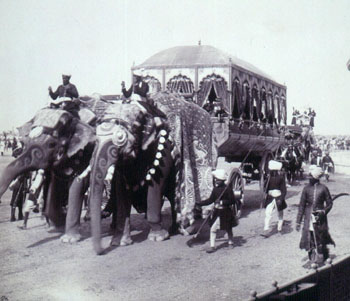
Delhi Durbar of 1903, held to commemorate the coronation of King Edward VII and Queen Alexandra as Emperor and Empress of India: Elephant Carriage of the Maharaja of Rewa at the Retainers' Review, 7 January 1903

The district of Rewa derives its name from the town of Rewa, the district headquarters, which is another name for the Narmada River.

Present day Rewa was part of the Baghelkhand region which extended from the present day Prayagraj in the North to Ratanpur in the South, Jabalpur in the West to Surajpur in the East.

== Demographics ==
Historical population
Year	Pop.	±% p.a.
1901	464,916	—
1911	496,116	+0.65%
1921	480,318	−0.32%
1931	512,530	+0.65%
1941	586,544	+1.36%
1951	633,824	+0.78%
1961	772,602	+2.00%
1971	977,894	+2.38%
1981	1,207,583	+2.13%
1991	1,554,987	+2.56%
2001	1,973,306	+2.41%
2011	2,365,106	+1.83%

According to the 2011 census, Rewa District has a population of 2,365,106, roughly equal to the nation of Latvia or the US state of New Mexico. This gives it a ranking of 191st in India (out of a total of 640). The district has a population density of 374 inhabitants per square kilometre (970/sq mi). Its population growth rate over the decade 2001–2011 was 19.79%. Rewa has a sex ratio of 930 females for every 1000 males, and a literacy rate of 73.42%. 16.73% of the population lives in urban areas. Scheduled Castes and Scheduled Tribes make up 16.22% and 13.19% of the population respectively.

Religions in Rewa district (2011)
Religion	Percent
Hinduism	95.93%
Islam	3.61%
Other or not stated	0.46%

Hinduism is majority religion in Rewa district with 95.93% followers. Islam is second most popular religion of Rewa with approximately 3.61% following it. Christianity is followed by 0.08%, Jainism by 0.03%, Sikhism by 0.04% and Buddhism by 0.04%. Around 0.01% stated 'Other Religion', approximately 0.26% stated 'No Particular Religion'.

Languages of Rewa district (2011)
1. Bagheli (65.0%)
2. Hindi (34.3%)
3. Others (0.65%)

At the time of the 2011 census, 65.01% of the population spoke Bagheli and 34.34% Hindi as their first language.

== Governance ==
Rewa district, itself the Rewa Lok Sabha constituency, is divided into following 8 Vidhan Sabha (Legislative assembly) Constituencies:

1. Deotalab
2. Gurh
3. Mangawan
4. Mauganj
5. Rewa
6. Semariya
7. Sirmaur
8. Teonthar

== Climate ==
Rewa has a humid subtropical climate, with cold, misty winters, hot summers and humid monsoon seasons. Summers start in late March and go on till mid-June, the average temperature being around 30 °C (86 °F), with the peak of summer in May, when the highs regularly exceed 45 °C (104 °F). The monsoon starts in late June and ends in late September. These months see about 40 inches (1025 mm) of precipitation. The average temperature is around 25 °C (77 °F) and the humidity is quite high. Temperatures rise again up to late October when winter starts, which lasts up to early March. Winters in Rewa are cold and misty with average temperatures around 15 °C (58 °F) and little rain. The winter peaks in January, when temperatures may drop close to freezing on some nights. The total annual rainfall is about 1128 mm (44 inches). The highest verified temperature ever recorded in Rewa was 48.2 °C, on 28 May 2024.

Climate data for Rewa, Madhya Pradesh (1981–2010, extremes 1965–present)
Month	Jan	Feb	Mar	Apr	May	Jun	Jul	Aug	Sep	Oct	Nov	Dec	Year
Record high °C (°F)	31.4 (88.5)	36.5 (97.7)	40.7 (105.3)	45.0 (113.0)	48.2 (118.8)	46.6 (115.9)	43.2 (109.8)	39.4 (102.9)	37.6 (99.7)	38.6 (101.5)	36.2 (97.2)	31.1 (88.0)	46.8 (116.2)
Mean daily maximum °C (°F)	23.7 (74.7)	27.0 (80.6)	33.1 (91.6)	38.6 (101.5)	41.1 (106.0)	38.8 (101.8)	33.3 (91.9)	31.8 (89.2)	32.0 (89.6)	32.2 (90.0)	28.9 (84.0)	25.3 (77.5)	32.2 (90.0)
Mean daily minimum °C (°F)	8.1 (46.6)	10.8 (51.4)	15.6 (60.1)	21.1 (70.0)	25.6 (78.1)	26.8 (80.2)	25.0 (77.0)	24.3 (75.7)	23.4 (74.1)	19.1 (66.4)	13.1 (55.6)	8.4 (47.1)	18.4 (65.1)
Record low °C (°F)	0.6 (33.1)	1.6 (34.9)	6.4 (43.5)	11.6 (52.9)	16.5 (61.7)	20.1 (68.2)	15.2 (59.4)	20.3 (68.5)	10.2 (50.4)	9.0 (48.2)	4.4 (39.9)	1.9 (35.4)	0.6 (33.1)
Average rainfall mm (inches)	17.4 (0.69)	21.8 (0.86)	7.1 (0.28)	5.7 (0.22)	10.5 (0.41)	114.6 (4.51)	298.4 (11.75)	296.4 (11.67)	208.5 (8.21)	44.7 (1.76)	7.4 (0.29)	7.3 (0.29)	1,039.8 (40.94)
Average rainy days	1.5	1.7	0.8	0.5	1.2	5.3	12.6	12.4	8.3	2.2	0.5	0.6	47.5
Average relative humidity (%) (at 17:30 IST)	58	51	36	28	31	49	72	77	73	60	60	61	54
Source: India Meteorological Department

== Divisions ==
Rewa district of Madhya Pradesh has 8 Tehsils

1. Gurh
2. Huzur
3. Jawa
4. Mangawan
5. Raipur - Karchuliyan
6. Semaria
7. Sirmaur
8. Teonthar

== Tourism ==
=== Historical Places ===
- Rewa Fort

It is the main tourist attractions in Rewa.Behind it there are two rivers which provide the scenic beauty to the fort. The main gate of the fort is a good example of Indian architecture.It also provides accommodations to tourists. It have also houses a restaurant and a museum. The main sites to visit here are the canon, royal silver throne, museum hall’s chandelier, arms gallery and the white tiger gallery.

- Govindgarh Palace and Lake

Govindgarh, the summer capital of Mahraja Rewa, is about 18 km from Rewa in Madhya Pradesh, India. The Rewa, with an area of about 13,000 m^{2}, was the largest princely state in the Bagelkhand Agency and the second largest in Central India Agency. The British political agent for Bagelkhand resided at Satna, on the East Indian railway. The Bagelkhand Agency was dissolved in 1933 and Rewa was placed under the authority of the Indore Residency.

- Stupa

This archaeological site has a history with the ancient Buddhist stupas that you will find here. Discovered in the year 1982, these stupas are about two thousand years old and belonging to the Ashoka’s reign. You will find three large stupas carved out of clay bricks and several small stupas out of 46 different stones.

Deur Kothar also has five thousand years old rocky caves which are definitely very intriguing in their appearance. As an attempt to spread Buddhism in the Vindhyan region during the period of Ashoka, the remains of Lord Buddha were distributed to create these stupas. Deur Kothar is an archaeological site among the prestigious Rewa tourist places where followers of Buddhism have build stupas after this site was found.

=== Natural Wonders ===
- Purwa Falls

The Falls are 200 feet high (nearly 67 m). Depending on the season it releases a large volume of water. The Falls are on River Toans, descending the cliff of Rewa Plateau.

- Keoti Falls

Keoti Waterfall is the 24th highest waterfall in India and a popular tourist destination.

- Bahuti Falls

Bahuti is the highest waterfall in Madhya Pradesh. It is on the river Sellar as it rushes down the edge of the Valley of Mauganj to join the Bihad River, which is a tributary of Tamsa or Tons River. It is near Chachai Falls and has a height of 198 metres (650 ft).

- Chachai Falls

Chachai falls are more than 130 meters in height and are situated on River Bihad, near Rewa, Madhya Pradesh. These falls are the second highest waterfalls in Madhya Pradesh and is one of the highest single-drop waterfalls in India. It was once praised by former Indian Prime Minister Sh. Jawahar Lal Nehru for its breathtaking charisma and beauty. However, that time is long gone as a river diversion has been constructed on this river, which splits all of the water of Bihad river in two halves, one for generation of Electricity at Toans Hydroelectric Power Plant and another half for irrigation in nearby villages, leaves absolutely no water for the waterfalls. The course of the river has been changed and since then, the waterfalls are dry, which flood once during the rainy season when excess water is discharged from the dam.

- White Tiger Safari & Zoo Mukundpur

The first of the white tigers to be captured was a cub, approximately two years old, who was captured by Maharajah Martand Singh of Rewa. The tiger lived in captivity at the Maharajah's summer palace for five years and, on its death, was stuffed and sent as a gift to King George V as a sign of India's loyalty to the crown. To this day, white tigers are still kept at the Maharajah's summer palace which is located at Govindgarh.

There is a White Tiger Safari in Mukundpur which first opened on 3 April 2016.

- Rani Talab

=== Solar Power Plant ===
Rewa Ultra Mega Solar is an operational ground mounted, grid-connected photovoltaic solar park spread over an area of 1,590 acres (6.9 km2) in the Gurh tehsil of Rewa district.

== Economy ==
A limestone belt runs through the Rewa district and coal is found in the nearby districts of Shahdol, Umaria, Sidhi and Singrauli. Cement factories are located in nearby Naubasta, Bela (Satna district) and Bhagwar (Sidhi district). The Jaypee Group has built a township known as Jaypee Nagar in Rewa. Prism cement (previously Rasi Cement), operates near Rewa in Satna district.

The 750MW Rewa Ultra Mega Solar plant, one of the largest solar power projects in India was commissioned in July 2018.

In 2006, the Ministry of Panchayati Raj named Rewa one of the country's 250 most backward districts (out of a total of 640 districts in India). It is one of the 24 districts in Madhya Pradesh currently receiving funds from the Backward Regions Grant Fund Programme (BRGF).

== Transport ==
Railways: Rewa is connected to Satna through a 50 km Rewa-Satna Rail Line. Satna falls on the Mumbai Howrah main line via Allahabad. For state capital Bhopal and National capital Delhi there is daily train service from Rewa. Rewa Jabalpur intercity is also a good train for commuting between these two cities within single day.

Road: Main city lies where NH30 and NH39 interact with each other. It is connected with Jabalpur and Nagpur on one side and Prayagraj, Varanasi on the other side by four lane national highway. Sidhi and Shahdol districts are connected by two lane road. Daily bus service is available for major cities like Nagpur, Bhopal, Indore, Raipur etc.

Air: Airport construction is going on and will be open for public soon. One major Airport to Rewa is in Prayagraj which is 130 kilometres (80.7 miles) away and has flights to major destinations such as Delhi, Bangaluru, Mumbai, Pune, Kolkata etc. Other nearest airport is at Khajuraho. Rewa also has an air strip. The airport received approval from the DGCA in September 2024, making it the sixth operational airport in the State. Prime Minister Narendra Modi inaugurated the new terminal building on 20 October 2024.

== Notable people ==
- Lt General Upendra Dwivedi, Chief of Army Staff of the Indian Army
- A.H. Nizami, Historian of Rewa
- Thakur Ranmat Singh Baghel, legendary freedom fighter and 1857 revolt leader of Baghelkhand.
- Avani Chaturvedi, India's first female fighter pilot
- Girish Gautam, former Speaker of Legislative assembly of Madhya Pradesh
- Kumud Mishra, Indian actor
- Ishwar Pandey, former Indian Cricketer
- Kuldeep Sen, Indian Cricketer
- Rajendra Shukla, MLA and Deputy CM of Madhya Pradesh
- Awadhesh Pratap Singh, former politician and Member of the Constituent Assembly
- Govind Narayan Singh, former Chief Minister of Madhya Pradesh
- Martand Singh, Indian wildlife conservationist, former Rajpramukh of Vindhya Pradesh, former member of parliament from Rewa and the last ruling Maharaja of Rewa
- Mohena Singh, Indian Television actress
- Pushpraj Singh, former minister of Education of Madhya Pradesh state, former Member of legislative assembly of Madhya Pradesh and the present Maharaja of Rewa
- Sriniwas Tiwari, former Speaker of Legislative assembly of Madhya Pradesh
- Ram Vilas Vedanti, Indian Politician, former MP and Member of Shri Ram Janmabhumi Trust

== See also ==
- Agdal
- Bandhavgarh
- Chachai Falls
- Govindgarh
- Keoti Falls
- Malpar
- Misirgawan, Hanumana
- Purwa Falls
- Sirmaur
