= Hanumana =

Hanumana हनुमना
- Town
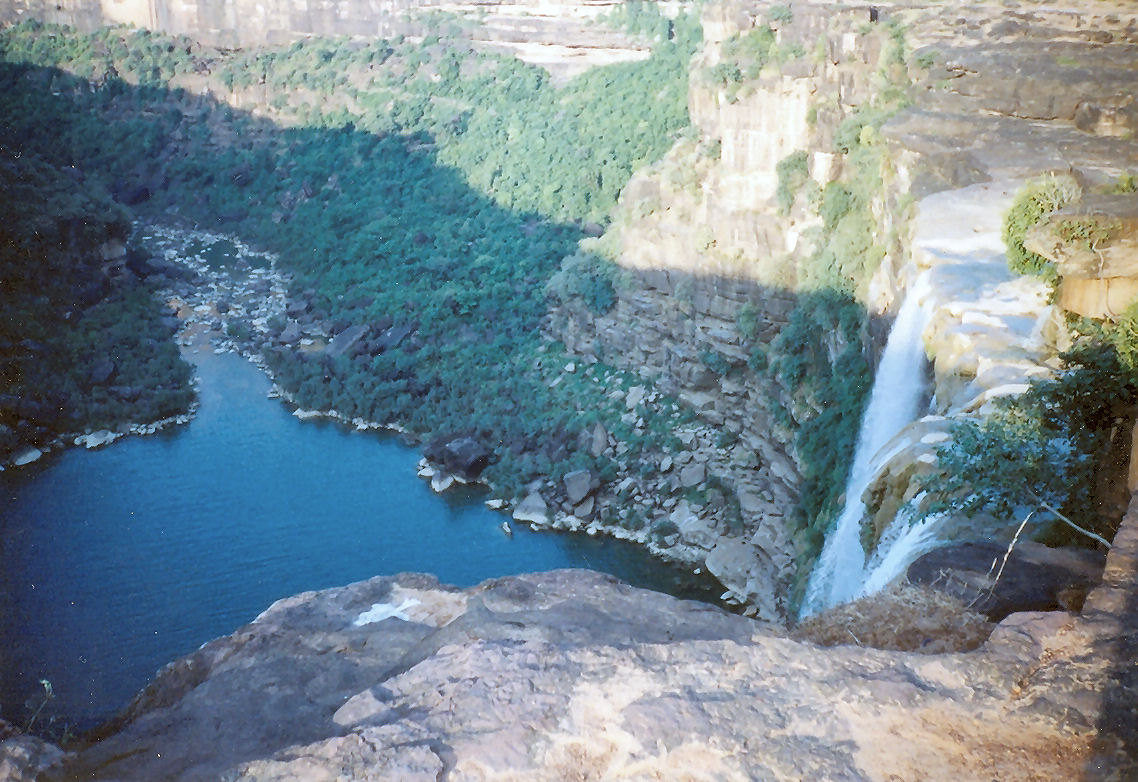
- Bailohi falls near Hanumana

- Location in Madhya Pradesh, India Hanumana (India)
- Coordinates: 24°46′30″N 82°5′24″E
- Country: India
- State: Madhya Pradesh
- District: Mauganj

Population (2001)
  - Total: 14,873

Languages
  - Official: Hindi, Bagheli
- Time zone: UTC+5:30 (IST)
- ISO 3166 code: IN-MP
- Vehicle registration: MP

Hanumana is a town and a nagar panchayat in Mauganj district in the Indian state of Madhya Pradesh and some Neighbouring Towns are Manikwar, Mauganj And Mangawan. Hanumana is also a Tehsil Headquarter.

== Demographics ==
As of 2011 India census, Hanumana had a population of 254,882. Males constitute 52% of the population and females 48%. Hanumana has an average literacy rate of 53%, lower than the national average of 59.5%: male literacy is 64%, and female literacy is 41%. In Hanumana, 19% of the population is under 6 years of age.

== Economy ==
After the year 2000, Hanumana became an education hub for nearby villages, however its business hub image went down drastically as all villages now have their own marketplace. Now many people from nearby villages come to Hanumana to pursue an education. Students pursue technical education like medical, Engineering, MBA and more migrate to other cities within and out of Madhya Pradesh. People of Hanumana started migrating to big cities like Indore, Bhopal, Mumbai and Delhi for education and jobs. The main income source of adjacent villages is farming.

== Landmarks ==
Landmarks in the town include a waterfall called Kurwa, There is a famous temple of Lord Shiva known as Hateshwarnath located in Village Hata. A 150-year-old temple, Hanuman Temple. A myth about the temple is that lord Hanuman was born there. The festivals Diwali, Dashra, Rakhi and Holi are widely celebrated.

== Transport ==
By air

The nearest airport is Rewa Airport in Rewa, Madhya Pradesh.

By bus

Bus stand available in the city bus stand. Deotalab is connected by private bus services to all nearest major cities.
