= Mangawan =

- Town
- Location in Madhya Pradesh, India Mangawan (India)
- Coordinates: 24.68°N 81.55°E
- Country: India
- State: Madhya Pradesh
- District: Rewa
- Elevation: 305 m (1,001 ft)

Population (2001)
  - Total: 11,556

Languages
  - Official: Hindi
- Time zone: UTC+5:30 (IST)
- ISO 3166 code: IN-MP
- Vehicle registration: MP

Mangawan is a town and a nagar panchayat in Rewa district in the Indian state of Madhya Pradesh. It is 30 km (19 mi) from the District headquarters of Rewa city. NH 7 and NH 27 goes through Mangawan. Prayagraj is 96 km (60 mi) on NH 27 and Varanasi is 220 km (140 mi) on NH 7 and Manikwar is 15 km (9.3 mi).

== Geography ==
Mangawan is located at 24.68°N 81.55°E. It has an average elevation of 305 metres (1,000 feet).

== Demographics ==
As of 2001 India census, Mangawan had a population of 11,556. Males constitute 53% of the population and females 47%. Mangawan has an average literacy rate of 57%, lower than the national average of 59.5%: male literacy is 68%, and female literacy is 45%. In Mangawan, 18% of the population is under 6 years of age.

== Transport ==
By Air

The nearest airport is Rewa Airport in Rewa, Madhya Pradesh.

By Bus

Bus stands are available in the city bus stand Rewa city and Mangawan.

By Train

The nearest railway station is Rewa railway station.
