= Teonthar =

- Town
- Location in Madhya Pradesh, India Teonthar (India)
- Coordinates: 24.98°N 81.65°E
- Country: India
- State: Madhya Pradesh
- District: Rewa
- Tehsil: Teonthar

Government
  - Body: Nagar panchayat
- Elevation: 151 m (495 ft)

Population (2001)
  - Total: 15,249

Languages
  - Official: Hindi, Bagheli language
- Time zone: UTC+5:30 (IST)
- PIN: 486220
- ISO 3166 code: IN-MP
- Vehicle registration: MP 17
- Lok Sabha Constituency: Rewa (Lok Sabha constituency)
- Vidhan Sabha constituency: Teonthar

Teonthar is a town and a nagar panchayat in Rewa district in the Indian state of Madhya Pradesh.

== Ancient history ==
Teonthar was once ruled by the Kol dynasty kings. Teonthar lies on one of the oldest routes between north India and south India. Teonthar is also known for its Deor kothar (Devanāgarī: देउर कोठार, also Deur Kothar) stupas. These Buddhists stupas are credited to the Mauryan emperor, Ashoka.

== History of Teonthar ==
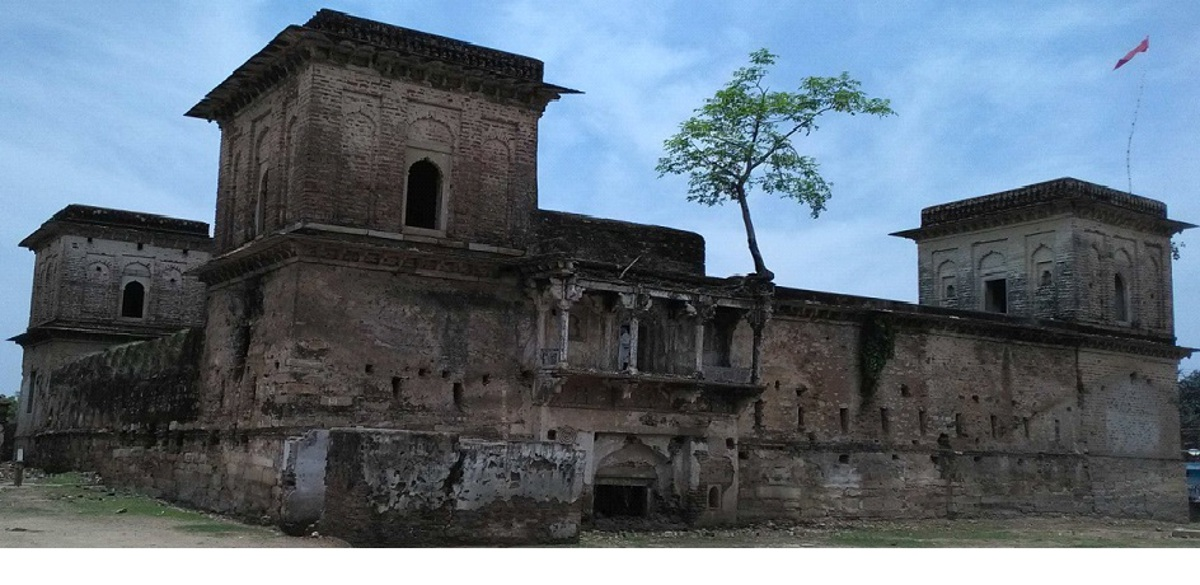

Venvanshi Maharajas of Singrauli ruled Teonthar as part of their territories till 1947. The Bhurtiya kings ruled here and their administration was run from Kolgarhi only.

It was at the confluence of river Tamasa and Kharari river in the foothills of Vindhya mountain. The area of Tyonthar was ruled by the Venvanshi kings. According to the book Kyoti ki Garhi by historian Ramsagar Shastri, Maharaja Kot Singh of Singrauli expanded the kingdom towards the north in the beginning of the ninth century and conquered the area up to Arail Jhunsi and conquered small kingdoms. There were many small kingdoms on the sprawling land north of Tyonthar and south of Jhunsi. In which there was the kingdom of the Kolas, somewhere of the Bhuttis. The Venvanshi rulers of Singrauli captured Jhunsi and then defeated the small Kol and Bhurtiya kings and took control of them and started ruling by making Tyonthar their stronghold in the north east.

== Geography ==
Teonthar is located at 24.98°N 81.65°E. It has an average elevation of 151 metres (495 feet). The town is situated on the banks of Tamsa River (also known as the Tons River) which is a tributary of the Ganges. Geographically, a large part of Teonthar is an alluvial plain. The alluvial plains of Teonthar are 100 metres (330 ft) in elevation. Due to its location and elevation, the area around Teonthar is flood prone.

== Location and Transportation ==
Teonthar is located near the state borders of Madhya Pradesh and Uttar Pradesh. It is situated at a distance of about 77 kilometers from Rewa and about 60 kilometers from the city of Allahabad. The town is well connected to both Rewa and Allahabad via National Highway 30 (NH30). Nearest railway stations are Shankargarh, Allahabad and Rewa. Allahabad Airport (Bamrauli) is nearest airport.

== Demographics ==
The town is divided into 15 wards and has a population of 17,039 (8,812 males and 8,227 females) according to 2011 census. 14.65% of total population of Teonthar is below 6 years of age. Sex ratio is 934 and average Literacy rate is 71.99% which is higher than state average of 69.32%. Hindus form 92.82% of the population whereas Muslims constitute 6.88%.

== Transport ==
By air

Nearest airport in Prayagraj, Uttar Pradesh.

By bus

Bus stand available in the city bus stand Teonthar.
