= Mauganj district =

- District of Madhya Pradesh
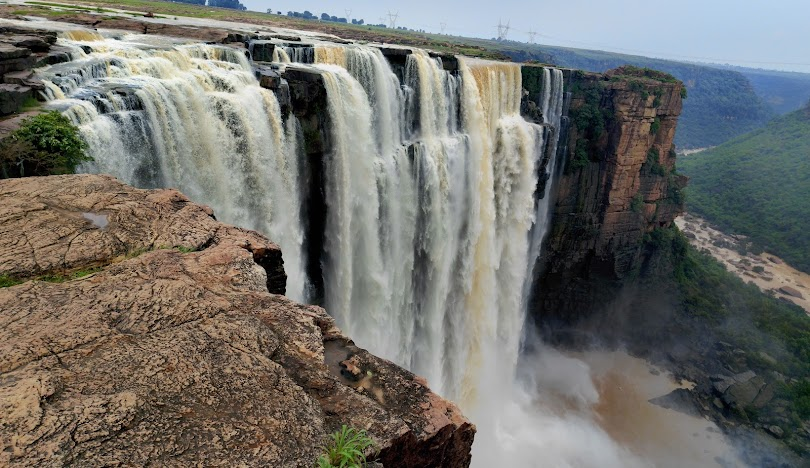
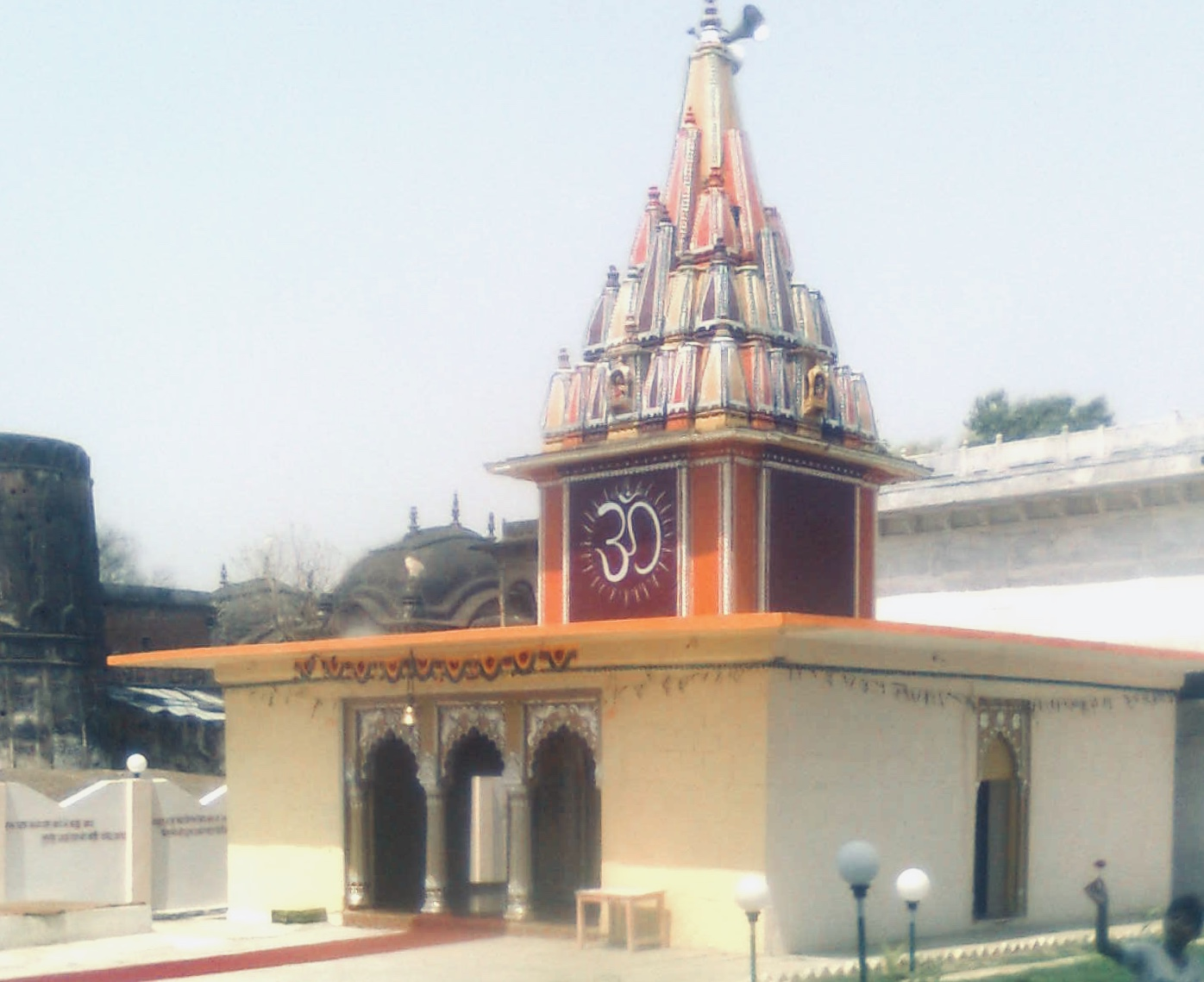
- Bahuti Waterfall; Panchmandir Naigarhi

- Location of Mauganj district in Madhya Pradesh
- Coordinates: 24°42′N 81°56′E
- Country: India
- State: Madhya Pradesh
- Division: Rewa
- Established: 15 August 2023
- Headquarters: Mauganj
- Tehsils: 1. Mauganj; 2. Hamumana; 3. Nai Garhi; 4. Deotalab(Proposed)

Government
  - District collector: Ajay Shrivastava (IAS)
  - Lok Sabha constituencies: 1. Rewa (shared with Rewa district)
  - Vidhan Sabha constituencies: 2

Area
  - Total: 1,866.88 km^{2} (720.81 sq mi)

Population (2011)
  - Total: 616,645
  - Density: 330.308/km^{2} (855.493/sq mi)

Demographics

Languages
  - Official: Hindi and Bagheli
- Time zone: UTC+05:30 (IST)
- Website: mauganj.nic.in

Mauganj district (Hindi pronunciation: [məuːgənd͡ʒ]) is one the districts of Madhya Pradesh. The administrative headquarters is at Mauganj. The district was carved out from the existing Rewa district on 15 August 2023 and was announced by then Chief Minister Shivraj Singh Chouhan.

== Geography ==
The total area of Mauganj is 1,866.88 km^{2} (720.81 sq mi) km. Mauganj District is part of the Rewa Division. Mauganj covered by Rewa, Sidhi, and Prayagraj district's boundaries.

== History ==
In the eleventh century, the Mauganj town was known as 'Mau Raj'. Rajput clan Sengar and they built fort in Mau Raj(now Mauganj), Nai Garhi and other places. Sengar kings ruled their kingdom here, however in the fourteenth century Baghels invaded Mau Raj and Baghel King Chhatradhari Singh new fort and named 'Nai Garhi' mean new fort.

== Politics ==
The district has two legislative assembly constituencies.

- Mauganj
- Deotalab

Both seats come under Rewa Lok Sabha constituency and the current member of parliament is Janardan Mishra.

== Towns ==
- Mauganj
- Nai Garhi
- Hanumana
- Deotalab

== Places to visit ==
Some places to visit in Mauganj -

- Bahuti Falls is the highest waterfall in Madhya Pradesh. It is 13 km away from Mauganj.
- Shiva temple, Deotalab is a historical and divine temple. It is 21 km away from Mauganj.
- Ashtbhuja Mata Mandir, Nai Garhi is a miracle temple dedicated to the goddess Durga. It is 15 km away from Mauganj.
- Nai Garhi Fort, Naigarhi has historical and beautiful forts. It is 17 km away from Mauganj.
- Gorma Dam is a major and beautiful dam in Mauganj. It is 21 km away from Mauganj.
- Hateshwar Nath Mandir, Hanumana is Bholenath Lord Shiv Mandir and located 18 km from Hanumana.

== Transport ==
The district has no railway station, the nearest railway station is Rewa railway station which is 65 kilometres from Mauganj. The nearest airport from the district is Rewa Airport. The district is well connected with roads. The National Highway 135 passes through Mauganj town.

== Notable people ==
- Girish Gautam – former speaker of Madhya Pradesh Legislative Assembly
- Pradeep Patel – MLA from Mauganj
- Sukhendra Singh, Indian Politician
- Achyutanand Mishra, Former MLA from Mauganj
