= Deotalab =

Village in Madhya Pradesh, India

- Village
- Location in Madhya Pradesh, India Deotalab (India)
- Coordinates: 24.68°N 81.55°E
- Country: India
- State: Madhya Pradesh
- District: Rewa
- Elevation: 305 m (1,001 ft)

Languages
  - Official: Hindi
- Time zone: UTC+5:30 (IST)
- ISO 3166 code: IN-MP
- Vehicle registration: MP

Deotalab is a village in Mauganj District of Madhya Pradesh, India. It is a proposed Tehsil and an Assembly constituency.

== Details ==
The Pin Code for Deotalab is 486341. Deotalab is famous for its Shiva Mandir, which hosts a fair on Mahashivratri.

Deotalab is located on Rewa Prayagraj National Highway and is connected by private bus services to nearby cities.

The nearest airport is Allahabad Airport.

== Nearby towns ==
Rewa, Mauganj, Mangawan, Nai Garhi, Gurh

=== Languages ===
Hindi, Bagheli
