= Bahuti Falls =

Coordinates: 24.7609°N 81.8289°E

Bahuti Prapat
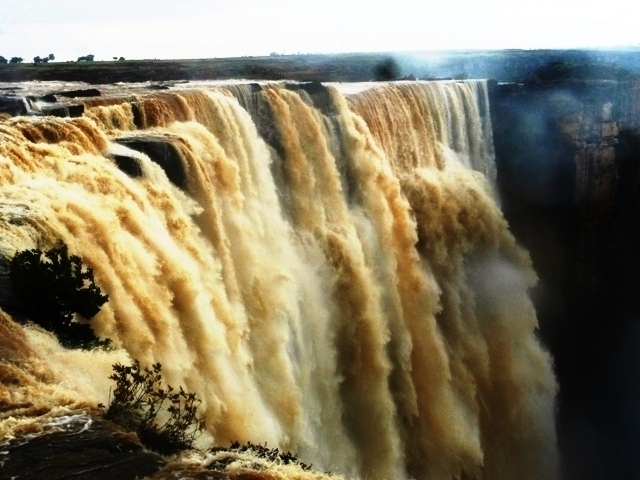
- Bahuti Falls in the monsoon.
- Interactive map of Bahuti Prapat
- Location: Bahuti, Mauganj District, Rewa Division, Madhya Pradesh, India
- Total height: 145 metres (476 ft)
- Watercourse: Nihai (Odda)

The Bahuti Falls is a waterfall in Mauganj district in the Indian state of Madhya Pradesh. It is the highest waterfall in Madhya Pradesh.

== The Falls ==
The Bahuti waterfall is on the river Nihai (also called as Odda) as it rushes down the edge of the Valley of Mauganj to join the Belan River, which is a tributary of Tamas or Tons River. The waterfall has a height of 145 metres (476 ft). Some say it is on the river Sellar.

The Bahuti Falls is an example of a nick point caused by rejuvenation. Knick point, also called a nick point or simply nick, represents breaks in slopes in the longitudinal profile of a river caused by rejuvenation. The break in channel gradient allows water to fall vertically giving rise to a waterfall.

== Flora and fauna ==
Rewa has a somewhat table landform. Bahuti Prapat lies on its north-eastern edge. Fauna species of Hyena, Nilgai, Jackal, Bengal Monster Lizard, Indian Roller Bird, Indian Grey Hornbill, Oriental Magpie Robin etc can be seen here.

== Mauganj ==
The region is elevated as compared to nearby districts. Earlier the fall was part of Rewa district, now it's part of Mauganj district. To reach Mauganj, one has to traverse the rugged and dissected terrain of the northeastern part of the Rewa Plateau. The region is characterized by rocky uplands, escarpments, and plateau edges associated with the Kaimur and Vindhyan highlands. Roads approaching Mauganj from Rewa, Hanumana, and Naigarhi pass through uneven plateau surfaces and small ghat sections. The area is dominated by red and lateritic (murum) soils, with patches of stony wasteland and seasonal streams. Waterfalls such as the nearby Bahuti Falls further indicate the deeply dissected nature of the landscape. To reach Rewa, several ghats are to be encountered - Chhuhiya Ghat (South-east), Dramondganj Ghat (North-east), Sohagi-Chak Ghat (North) and Semariya Ghat (West) and Patpara Ghat (East). The terrain is rocky, with large proportions of Red and Laterite Soil (Murum).

== See also ==
- List of waterfalls
- List of waterfalls in India
