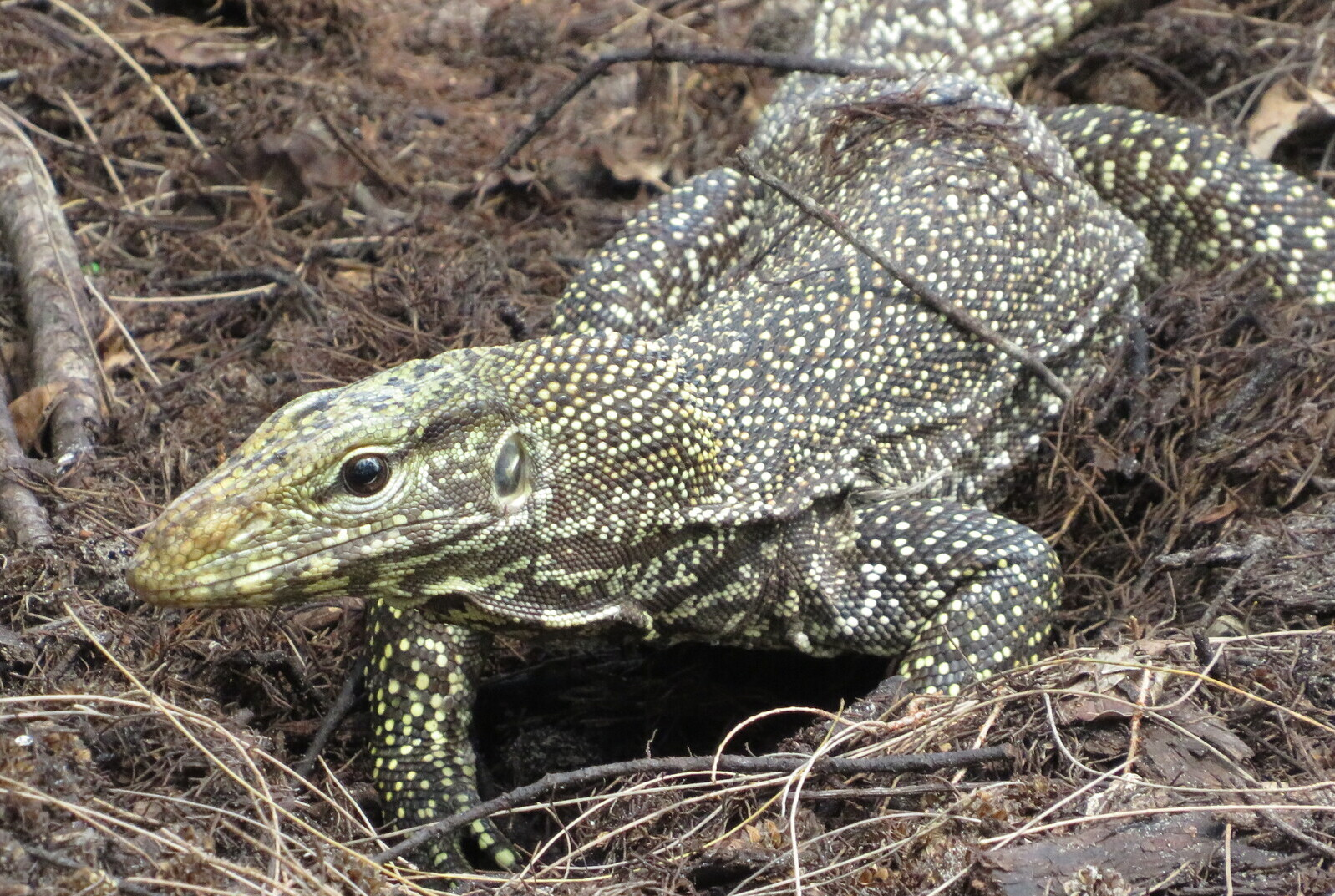

Conservation status
- Near Threatened (IUCN 3.1)
- CITES Appendix I

Scientific classification
- Kingdom: Animalia
- Phylum: Chordata
- Class: Reptilia
- Order: Squamata
- Suborder: Anguimorpha
- Family: Varanidae
- Genus: Varanus
- Subgenus: Empagusia
- Species: V. nebulosus

Binomial name
- Varanus nebulosus (JE Gray, 1831)

Synonyms
- Varanus bengalensis nebulosus

= Clouded monitor =

Species of lizard

The clouded monitor (Varanus nebulosus) is a species of monitor lizard, native to Myanmar, Thailand and Laos, Vietnam, to West Malaysia, Singapore, Sumatra, and Java. They are excellent tree climbers. It belongs to the subgenus Empagusia along with the Bengal monitor, the Dumeril's monitor and other monitor lizards. It had previously been listed as a subspecies of Bengal monitor by some herpetologists. It is a diurnal monitor.

== Description ==
Clouded monitors can on occasion grow up to 1.5 metres long.

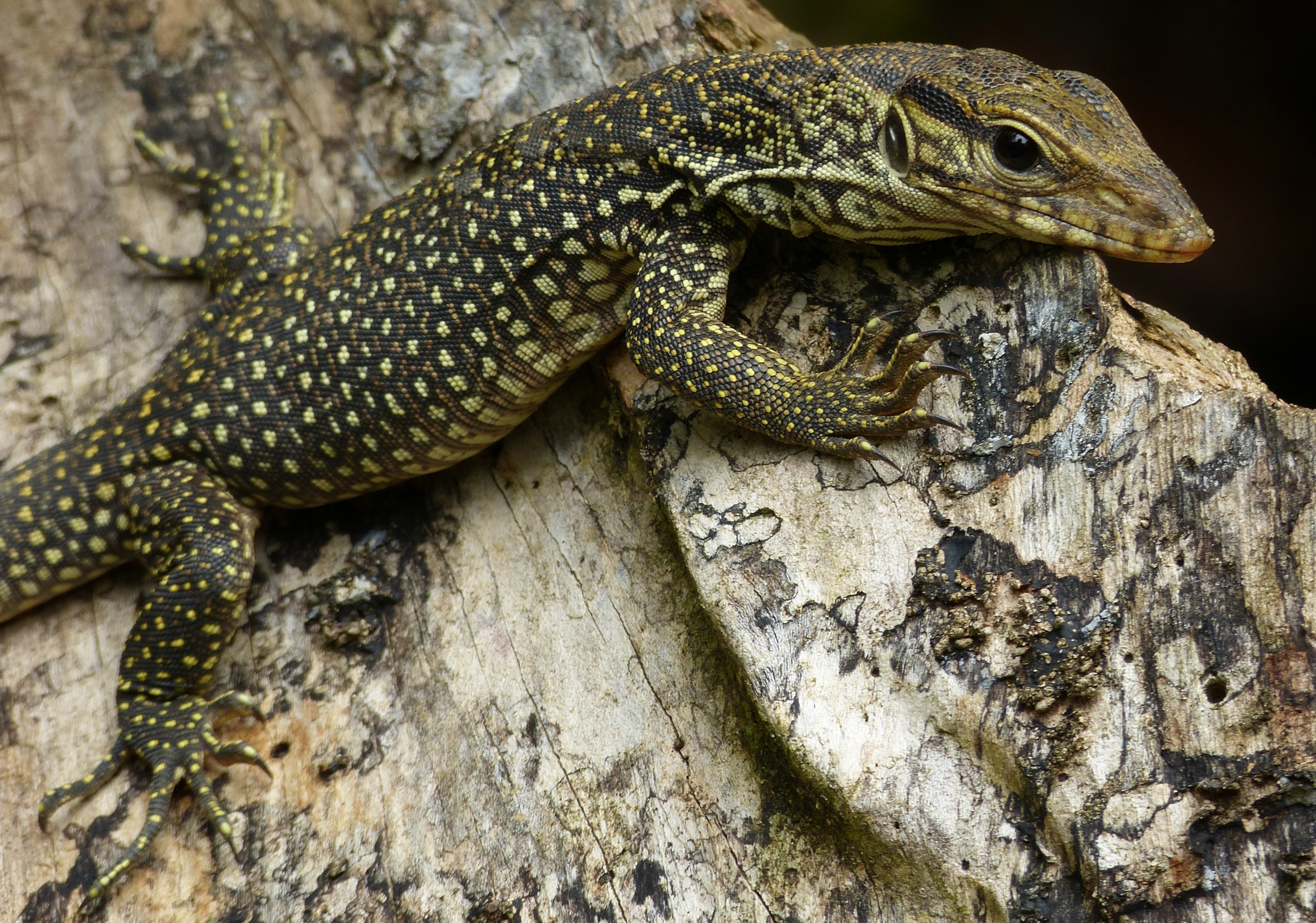
Juvenile

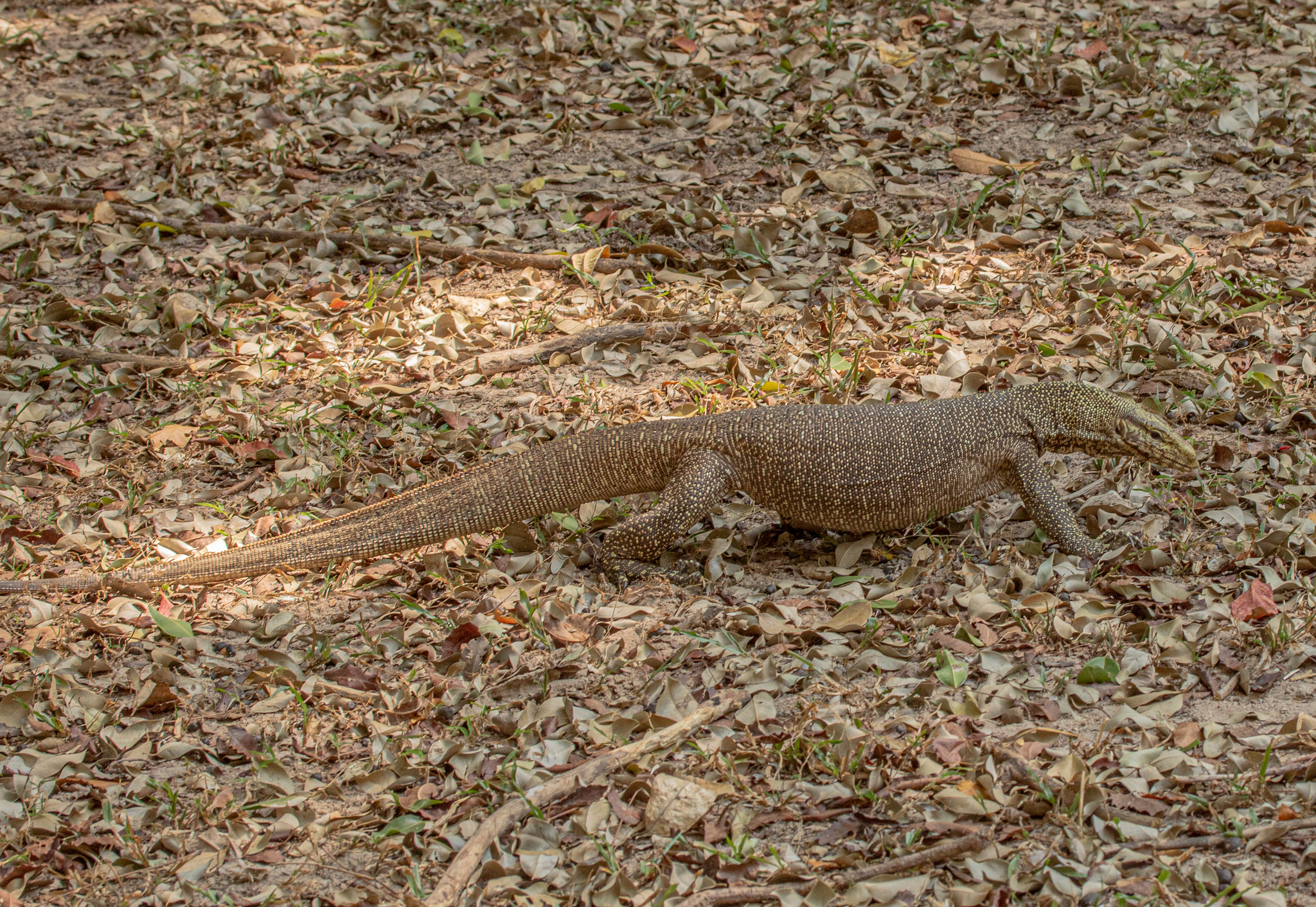
Adult
