= Chhaparband =

Hindu caste

Regions with significant populations
- India

Languages
- Hindi • Kannada • Marathi

Religion
- Hinduism (100%)

Related ethnic groups
- Musalman Chhaparband

The Chhaparband are a Hindu caste found in the states of Karnataka and Maharashtra in India. They are also known as Chhaparbasi, Chhaparwale and Rajput Chhaparband.

== Origin ==
The community claims to be descendants of a small group of Rajputs from North India who migrated to the Deccan region in search of employment. They state that they were given land in Pune by the Peshwa, in an area that was then known as Kala Wawar, which means "black farm" in Marathi language. This area later became known as Chhaparband Lane. The community subsequently took up the occupation of building roofs using grass and bamboo, and the word Chhaparband literally means "roofer." The community still speak Hindi at home, although the Karnataka Chhaparband also speak Kannada and the Maharashtra Chhaparband also speak Marathi. A section of the Chhaparband have converted to Islam, and formed a distinct community of Muslim Chharband.

They are divided into thirty clans, known as kuls. Every clan has its own origin myth. The main clans are the Baite, Bisen, Chandel, Chauhan, Janakwar, Pasihat, Dalawale Rajput, Paithanwale, Pardeshi Rajput and Sengar. The community is strictly endogamous, and each of the clan is exogamous.

== Present circumstances ==
The Chhapraband no longer practice their traditional occupation. They are mainly a community of small businessmen, although as education spreads, the community is involved in a number of occupation. Despite urbanization, the sense of community identity remains strong, with little intermarriage with other communities or castes. The Chhaparband are Hindu, and have their own clan goddesses. Their customs are similar to those of other Maharashtra Hindus.

== See also ==
- Muslim Chhaparband
