= V. flavescens =

V. flavescens may refer to:

- Varanus flavescens, a monitor lizard
- Vesperugo flavescens, a vesper bat
- Volana flavescens, an owlet moth
