= Pradeep Patel =

Indian politician

Member of Madhya Pradesh Legislative Assembly
- Incumbent
- Assumed office 2023
- Preceded by: Sukhendra Singh
- Constituency: Mauganj

Personal details
- Party: Bharatiya Janata Party
- Profession: Politician

Pradeep Patel is an Indian politician from Madhya Pradesh. He won two-time as an Member of the Madhya Pradesh Legislative Assembly from 2018 and 2023, representing Mauganj Assembly constituency as a Member of the Bharatiya Janata Party.

== Political career ==
In the 2018 Madhya Pradesh Legislative Assembly elections, Patel received a ticket from the Bharatiya Janata Party to contest from the Mauganj Assembly Constituency. He faced the Indian National Congress candidate, Sukhendra Singh, and won the election by a margin of 11,092 votes, securing a total of 47,753 votes compared to Singh's 36,661 votes.

In the 2023 Madhya Pradesh Legislative Assembly elections, Patel again received the BJP ticket for the same constituency and once more contested against Singh from the Indian National Congress. Patel won the election again, this time by a margin of 7,174 votes, obtaining a total of 70,119 votes while Singh received 62,945 votes.

== Controversy ==
On 19 November 2024, MLA Patel with his supporters and a JCB bulldozer arrived to demolish an encroachment near Mahadevan Mandir in Devra village, Mauganj. This led to a clash between the residents and MLA supporters followed by stone pelting and arson. Later MLA was arrested twice and an FIR was registered against him.

== See also ==
- List of chief ministers of Madhya Pradesh
- Madhya Pradesh Legislative Assembly
