= Nai Garhi =

Naigarhi Naigarhi
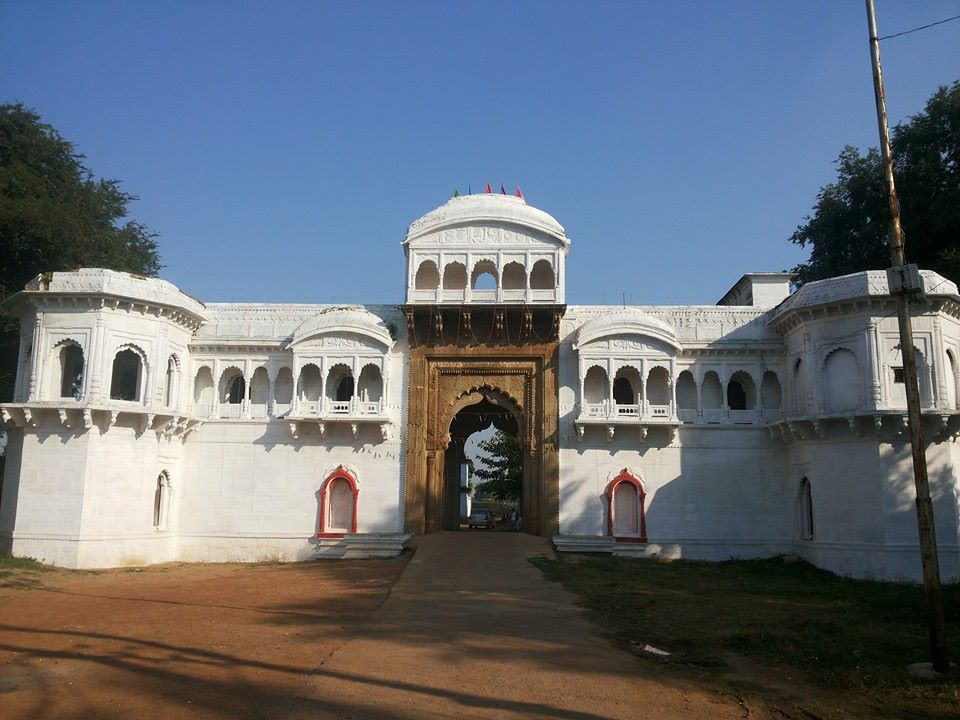

- Location in Madhya Pradesh, India
- Coordinates: 24°47′15″N 81°46′54″E
- Country: India
- State: Madhya Pradesh
- District: Rewa
- Established: 22/0125
- Founder: Chattradhari Singh

Population (2001)
  - Total: 9,767

Languages
  - Official: Hindi
- Time zone: UTC+5:30 (IST)
- PIN: 486340

Naigarhi is a rural town in the Mauganj district of Madhya Pradesh, India. It was founded by a Sengar Rajput king, Raja Chattradhari Singh. The town is notable for its medieval era architecture constructed by the Sengar kings.

== History ==
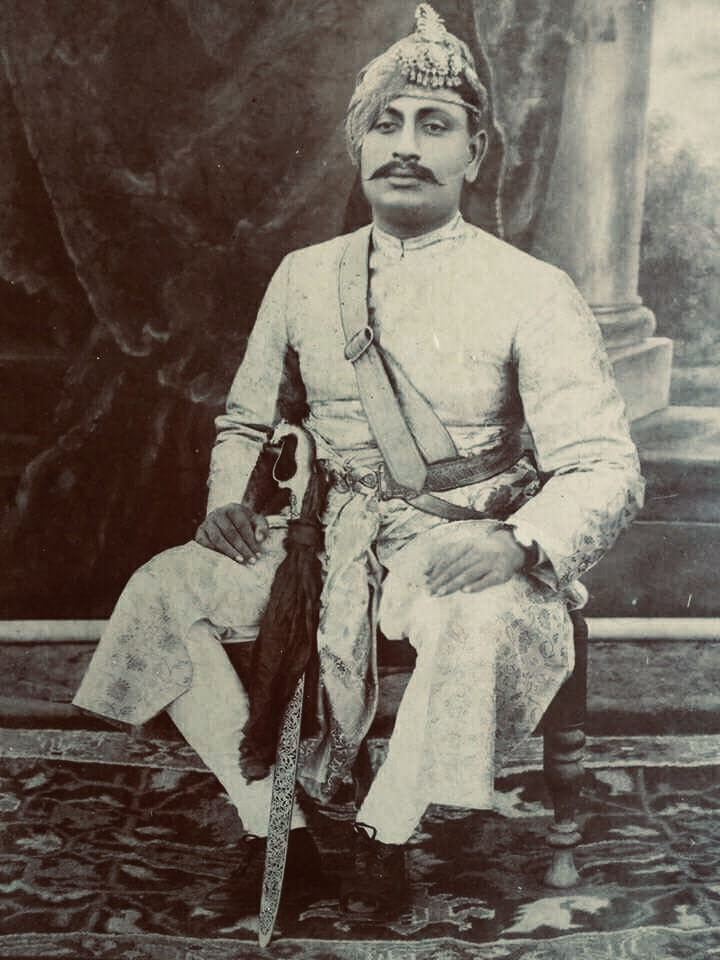
Thakur Gopal Sharan Singh of Nai Garhi, Madhya Pradesh

The town of Nai Garhi which means a 'new fortress' was established by Raja Chattradhari Singh of Sengar dynasty. According to the history of the region, he was a scion of the Sengar clan of Rajputs that ruled over a kingdom known as Mauganj which was also known as 'Mau Raj'. The dynasty i s believed to have arrived from Jalaun (now in Uttar Pradesh) in the eleventh century and ruled as independent kings until fourteenth century. However, a new clan of Rajputs called Baghelas captured Mauganj from Sengars. They established their control in the region and named it as Bagelkhand.

One of the Sengar scions was Raja Chattradhari Singh whose father being the junior prince migrated to Nai Garhi region, a few years before Mauganj was attacked by Baghelas. According to the bardic tales, the fort was first set to be built upon a land adjacent to the temple of Astha-bhuja (a varying form of goddess Durga) but the prince saw a dream where the goddess addressed him to move to a different location to maintain the sanctity of the temple and also advised him a suitable location. Therefore, that following morning he instructed his troops to spot a wild hare that was being chased by a wolf and the place where the wolf hunts the hare will be the sanctified location for the new fortress. The troops saw the exact sightings as discussed by the prince and ultimately found the location to build the fortress. The family chronicles state that the fortress was built by Raja Chattradhari Singh and the marvelous main gate known as the 'Hathi Darwaza' was built by his son Raja Hathi Raj Singh.

The rulers of this little but highly defensive kingdom maintained sovereign rule for a long period and used the title of Raja, however, they refrained from expanding their dominion any further due to the rising prowess of the Baghelas who established a cordial relationship with the Mughals and secured Bagelkhand by appointing numerous feudal lords. Essentially, the Sengars were able to maintain their sovereignty until the arrival of the British in the region.

=== Battle of Sathni and Itar ===
In 1812, a group of Pindaris raided Mirzapur territory which forced the then king of Rewa, Raja Jai Singh to accede to a treaty with the British Raj. This first Anglo-Baghela treaty (1812) brought dissatisfaction in the region mostly among the Sengar Rajputs who started aggression against the British.

In 1813, one Colonel Martindell reported in the region with a unit of Sepoys to quell the insurgency. A number of sepoys were killed and wounded at the behest of the Sengar Thakur whose headquarters was based in the village of Itar near Manikwar town. This battle is still remembered in the folk song known as 'Itar ka Raisa'. At some instance, the estate of Naigarhi was confiscated by the British who decided to reissue it to the then Thakur Jagat Bahadur Singh of Naigarhi, under one condition that the Thakur agreed to pay his dues and attended the Dussehara ceremonies held in the Rewa Durbar. Reportedly, the British also kidnapped Jagat Bahadur's eight-year-old son named Gopal Sharan Singh to get their work done. The Thakur agreed to pay off his dues and attended the Durbar of Rewa Maharaja. As a result, in 1882 the estate was re granted to the Sengar clan.

=== Aftermath ===
The last ruler of Naigarhi was Thakur Gopal Sharan Singh. He was born in 1890 and went on to become a revered poet of Hindi poetry. The total worth of his estates were Rs. 90,000 per annum and an amount of Rs. 6,500 was paid to the Durbar. He was awarded the title of 'Kavi Ratna' or the 'Gem among Poets'. While residing in his Lal Kothi Mansion in Allahabad he build cordial relationships with great poets of his time like Maithili Sharan Gupt and Harivansh Rai Bachchan. The Higher Secondary School in Nai Garhi is named after him and every year a poet event is organised by the government in honor of Singh.

== Politics ==
Naigarhi is under Deotalab vidhansabha. The first MLA of Deotalab was Thakur Someshwar Singh of Naigarhi. Naigarhi also started holding the Municipality elections and Kunwar Harshvardhan Singh (Bablu Bhaiya), grand son of Thakur Someshwar Singh has won the election two times.

== Education ==
Naigarhi has a two government schools, boys and girls separate. The other private schools are regional board affiliated, Hindi mediums are Saraswati Shishu Mandir, Saraswati Gyan Mandir, Jeevan Jyoti, and an only English medium school is Lok Manya Tilak High School in Mahavirpur. The only college is named after Thakur Someshvara Singh comprising the studies of Arts and Commerce.

== Tourism ==
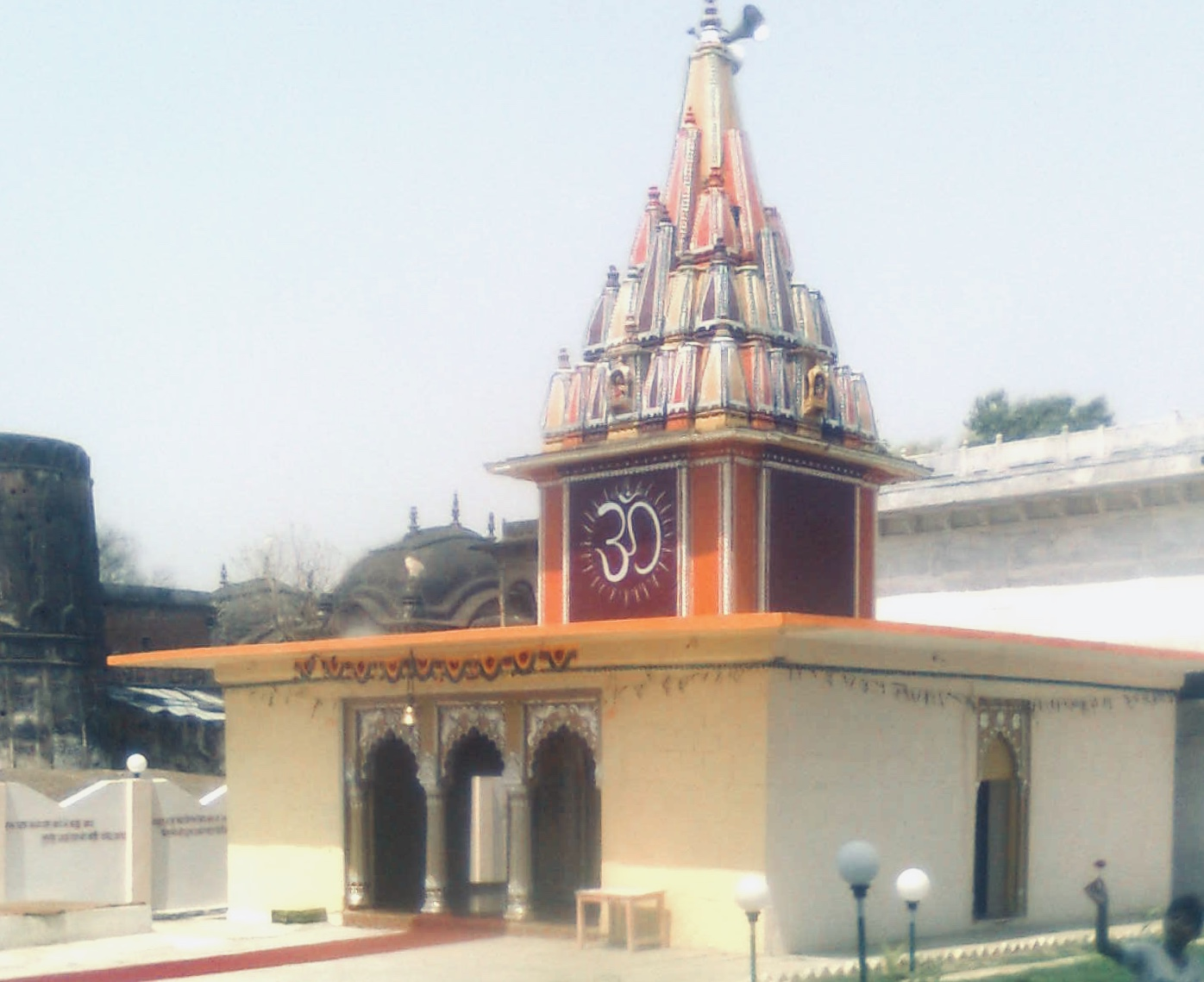
Panchamandir Temple in Nai Garhi fort

The tourism frequency of Naigarhi is very low due to its distance from highways. A couple of waterfalls, the most famous one in the small village of Bahuti which is some 5 km away from Naigarhi, the famous Maa Asthabhuja temple, the Naigarhi fort, the Panchmandir temple and the iconic view of a typical Indian village can be seen in Naigarhi.

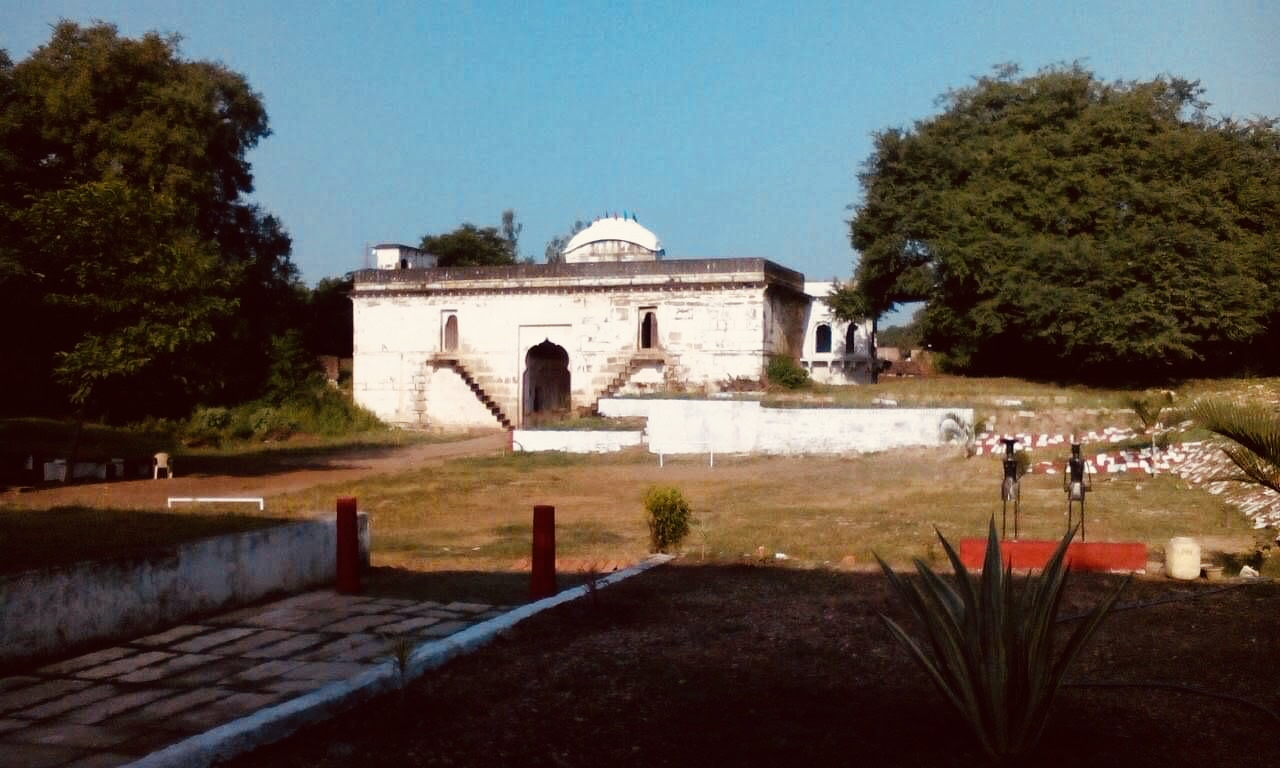
Inside view of the Nai Garhi Fort

The Panchamandir is dedicated to Rama who is the main deity of the Sengar dynasty, Hanuman and Shiva. It resembles the fine stone carving art of the medieval India. There is also a temple dedicated to the goddess Kali which is located within the fort and is a popular tourist destination.

== Festivities and culture ==
Apart from Durga Pooja in Dussherra, Diwali and Holi there is no festival which is celebrated here. But the Naigarhi fort has a reputation for decorating and celebrating Janamasthami with grandeur and holiness. Naigarhi fort also organises a holy feast called 'bhandara' in respect to the renovation of the Pancha-mandir temple in the precincts of the fort.

== Demographics ==
As of 2001 India census, Nai Garhi had a population of 8,767. Males constitute 51% of the population and females 49%. Nai Garhi has an average literacy rate of 50%, lower than the national average of 59.5%: male literacy is 63%, and female literacy is 36%. In Nai Garhi, 19% of the population is under 6 years of age.

== Transport ==
By air

Nearest airport in Prayagraj, Uttar Pradesh.

By bus

Bus stand available in Garhi.
