= Chhaparband (Muslim) =

Muslim community in India

Musalman Chhaparband
Regions with significant populations
- India

Languages
- Urdu (Dakhani) • Kannada • Marathi

Religion
- Islam

Related ethnic groups
- Chhaparband

The Chhaparband Muslims are a Muslim community inhabiting the states of Karnataka and Maharashtra in India. They are Muslim converts from the Chhaparband community.

== Origin ==
The Chhaparband are a community that were historically connected with thatching of roofs, an occupation no longer practiced. In Hindi, the word chhapar means roof and the Persian suffix band means binder and maker. They claim to have been Rajput soldiers in the armies of the Mughal Empire, as said to have originated from Kathiawar and Rajasthan. Their conversion to Islam is said to have occurred at the hands a Sufi saint Pir Bhai Phir Makhan. The Chhaparband speak the Dakhani dialect of Urdu, and are entirely Sunni Muslim. They are found mainly in north west Karnataka, mainly in the districts of Bijapur, Dharwad and Belgaum and the districts of Kolhapur and Sholapur in Maharashtra.

== Present circumstances ==
The Chhaparband are largely a landless community, with many employed as agricultural labourers or urban daily wage labourers. Apart from this, a significant number are now employed as truck drivers, carpenters, masons, fruit sellers and shop owners. Like other Muslim communities in the Deccan, they have a caste association, the Chhaparband Jamat. Each of their settlement also has an informal communal association known as a panchayat, which acts as an instrument of social control.
