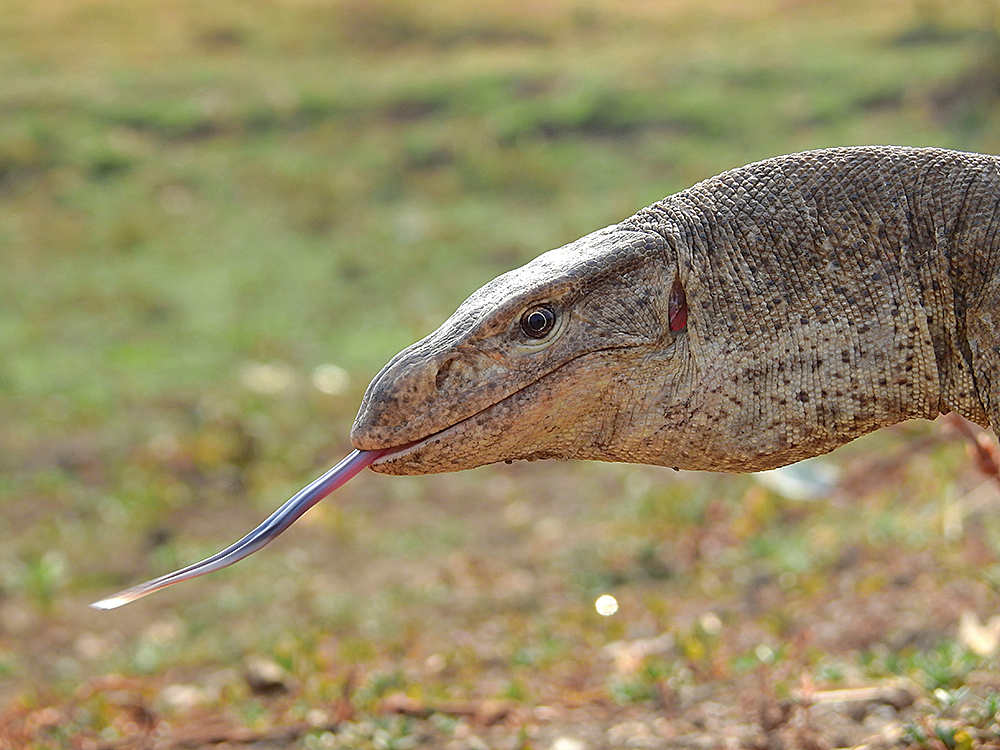
- In Maharashtra, India

Conservation status
- Near Threatened (IUCN 3.1)
- CITES Appendix I

Scientific classification
- Kingdom: Animalia
- Phylum: Chordata
- Class: Reptilia
- Order: Squamata
- Suborder: Anguimorpha
- Family: Varanidae
- Genus: Varanus
- Subgenus: Empagusia
- Species: V. bengalensis

Binomial name
- Varanus bengalensis (Daudin, 1802)

Synonyms
- Tupinambis bengalensis

= Bengal monitor =

Species of lizard

The Bengal monitor (Varanus bengalensis), also called the common Indian monitor, is a species of monitor lizard distributed widely in the Indian subcontinent and parts of Southeast Asia and West Asia.

== Taxonomy ==
The populations of monitors in India and Sri Lanka differ in the scalation from those of Myanmar; these populations were once considered subspecies of the Bengal monitor, but are now considered two species within the V. bengalensis species complex. What was once the nominate subspecies, V. bengalensis, is found west of Myanmar, while the clouded monitor (V. nebulosus) is found to the east. Clouded monitors can be differentiated by the presence of a series of enlarged scales in the supraocular region. The number of ventral scales varies, decreasing from 108 in the west to 75 in the east (Java).

== Description ==
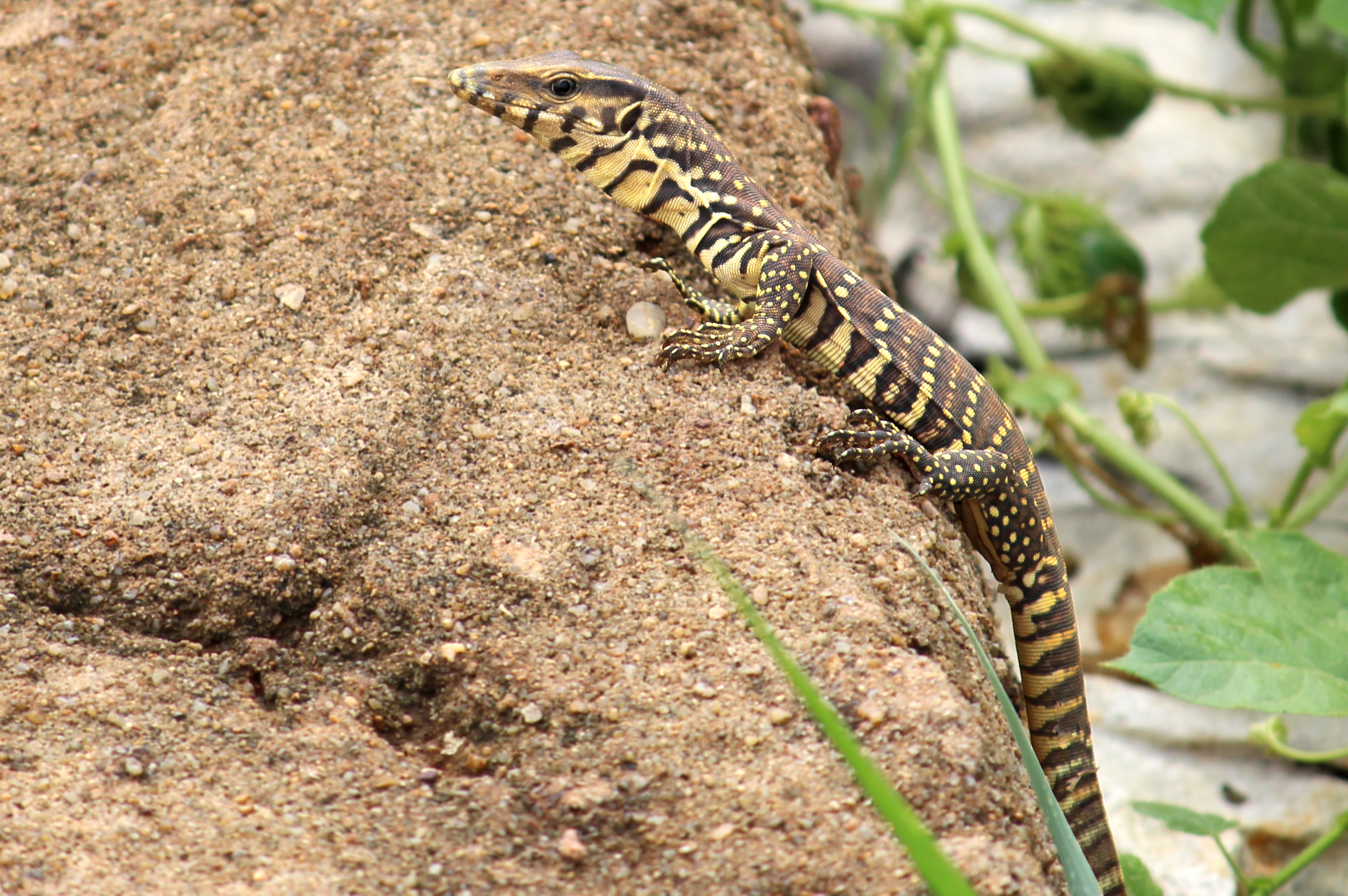
Juvenile Bengal monitor

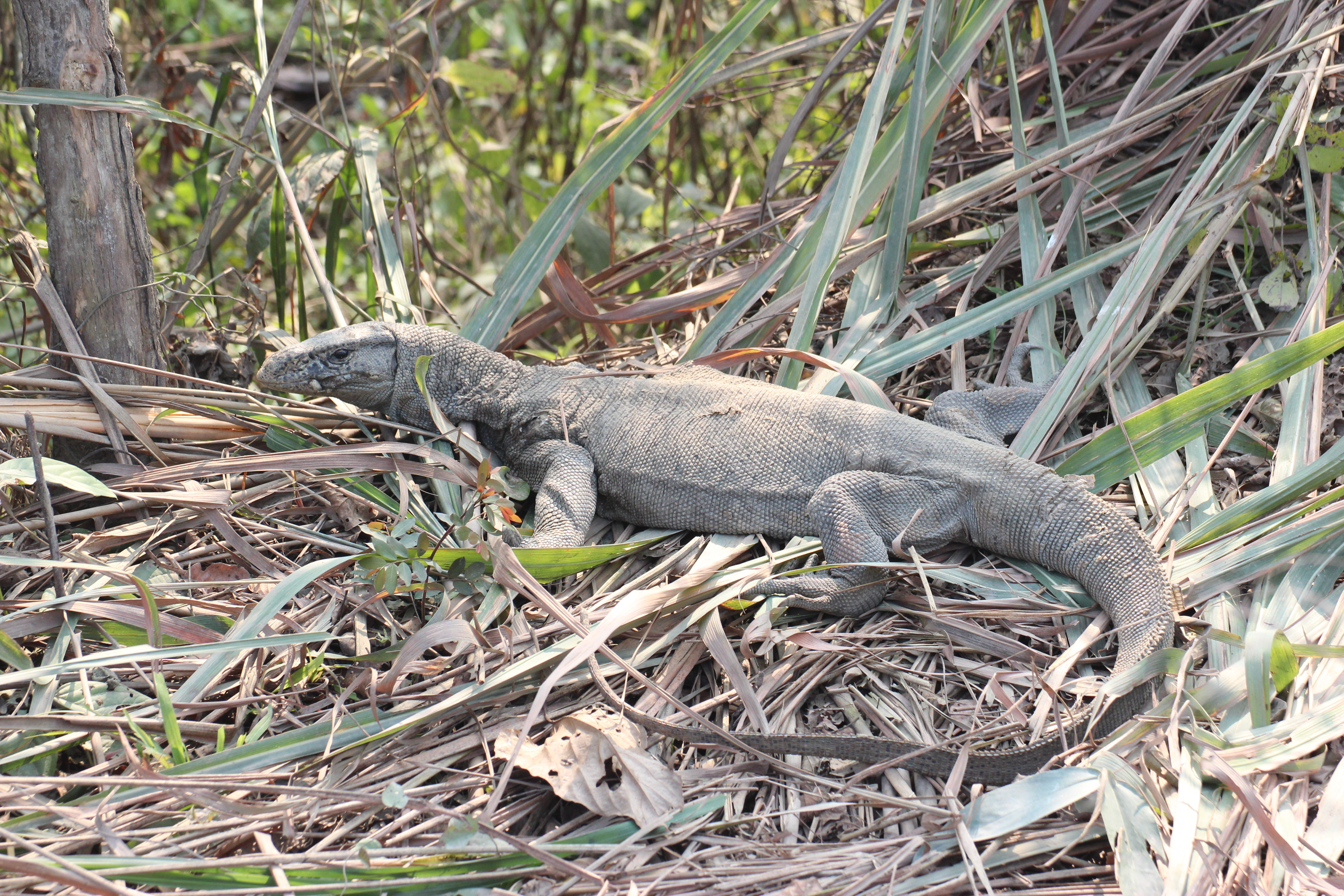
Adult in Kaziranga National Park

The Bengal monitor can reach 175 cm (69 in) with a snout-to-vent length (SVL) of 75 cm (30 in) and a tail of 100 cm (39 in). Males are generally larger than females. Heavy individuals may weigh nearly 7.2 kg (16 lb).

Young Bengal monitors are more colourful than adults. Young have a series of dark crossbars on the neck, throat and back. The belly is white, banded with dark crossbars and are spotted with grey or yellow, particularly in the eastern part of the range. On the dorsal surface of young monitors, there are a series of yellow spots with dark transverse bars connecting them. As they mature, the ground colour becomes light brown or grey, and dark spots give them a speckled appearance.

Bengal monitors have external nostril openings that are slit-like and oriented near horizontal, and positions between the eye and the tip of the snout. They can be closed at will, especially to keep away debris or water. The scales of the skin are rougher in patches and on the sides, they have minute pits, especially well distributed in males. These scales with micropores have glandular structures in the underlying dermal tissue and produce a secretion which may be a pheromone-like substance. Bengal monitors have a forked tongue similar to snakes. The function is mainly sensory, and is not very involved in the transport of food down the throat. Bengal monitors have fat deposits in the tail and body that serve them in conditions when prey are not easily available.

The lungs have spongy tissue unlike the sacs of other saurians. This allows for a greater rate of gas exchange and allows a faster metabolic rate and higher activity levels. Like all monitors, they have subpleurodont teeth, meaning the teeth are fused to the inside of the jaw bones. The teeth are placed one behind another, and there are replacement teeth behind and between each functional tooth (polyphyodont). The maxillary and dentary teeth are laterally compressed, sometimes with a slightly serrate cutting edge, while the premaxillary teeth are conical. There are 78 premaxillary teeth, 10 maxillary and 13 dentary teeth. Replacement teeth move forward and about four replacements happens each year for a tooth.

The Bengal monitor has venom glands. However, only one controversial case report of fatal renal failure as a result of envenomation is known.

== Distribution and habitat ==
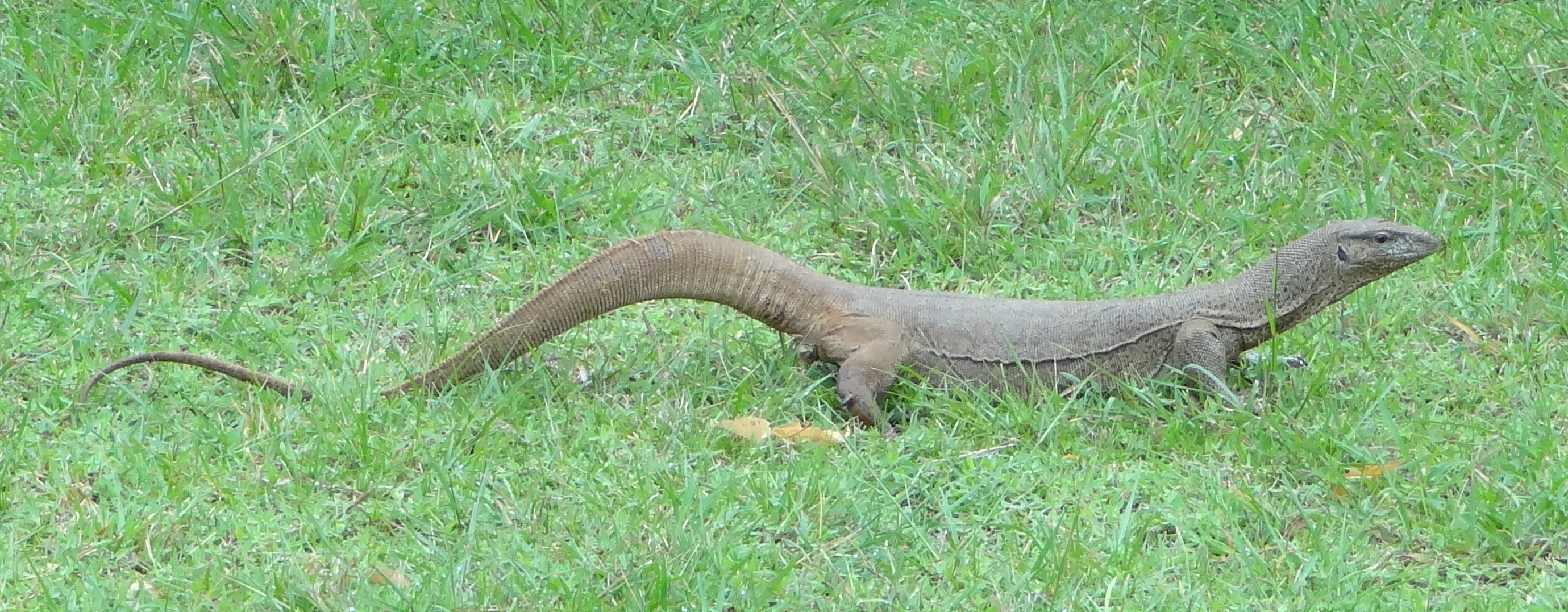
Bengal monitor in Sri Lanka

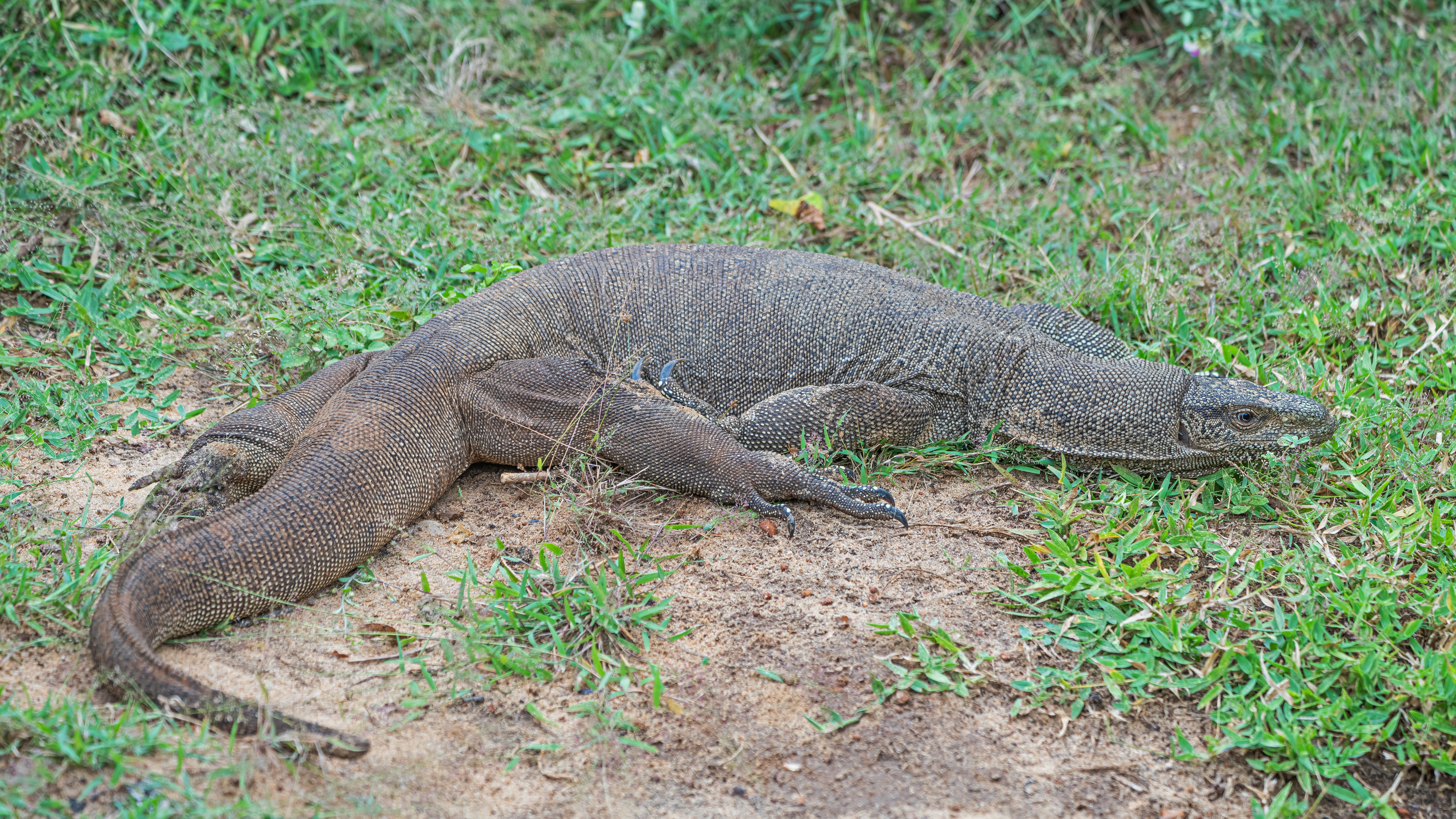
Adult Bengal monitor in Bundala National Park, Sri Lanka

The Bengal monitor ranges from Iran to Java, and is among the most widely distributed monitor lizard. It inhabits river valleys at elevations below 1,500 m (4,900 ft) in dry semiarid desert habitats to moist forest. It also inhabits agricultural areas, but prefers forests with large trees. Generally, high ground cover with large trees are favorable areas.

== Ecology and behaviour ==
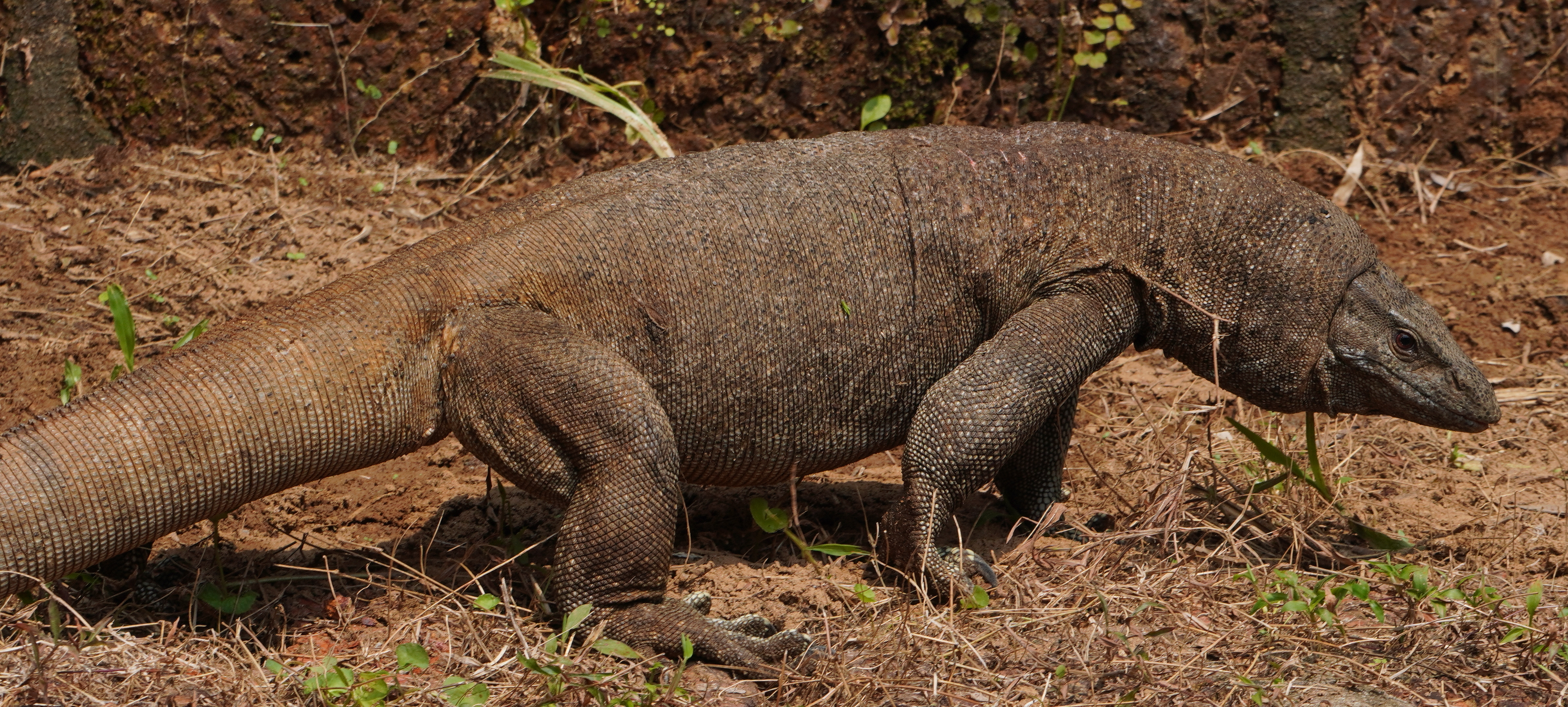
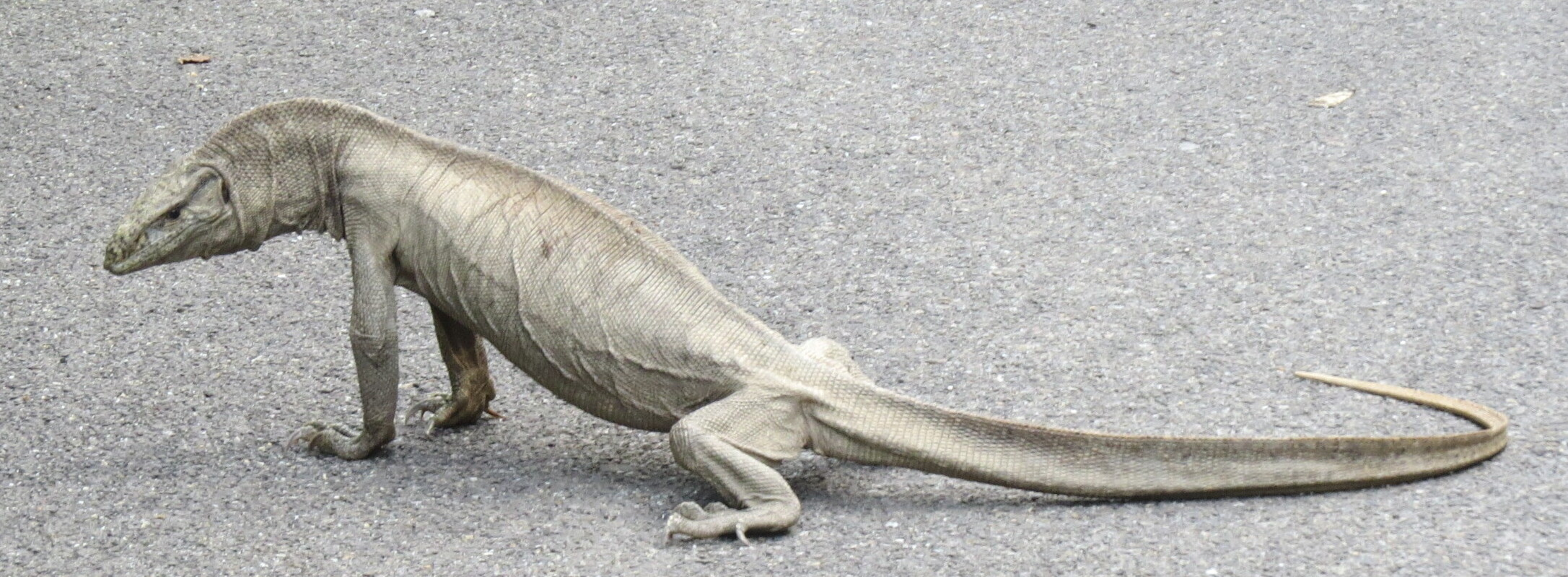
Healthy (left) and emaciated (right) Bengal monitors

Bengal monitors are usually solitary and usually live on the ground, although the young are often seen on trees. Bengal and yellow monitors are sympatric but are partially separated by their habitat as Bengal monitors prefers forest over agricultural areas. Bengal monitors shelter in burrows they dig or crevices in rocks and buildings, whilst clouded monitors prefer tree hollows. Both species will make use of abandoned termite mounds. Bengal monitors are diurnal like other monitors, becoming active around 6 AM and bask in the morning sun. During winter in the colder parts of their range, they may take shelter and go through a period of reduced metabolic activity. They are not territorial, and may change their range seasonally in response to food availability.

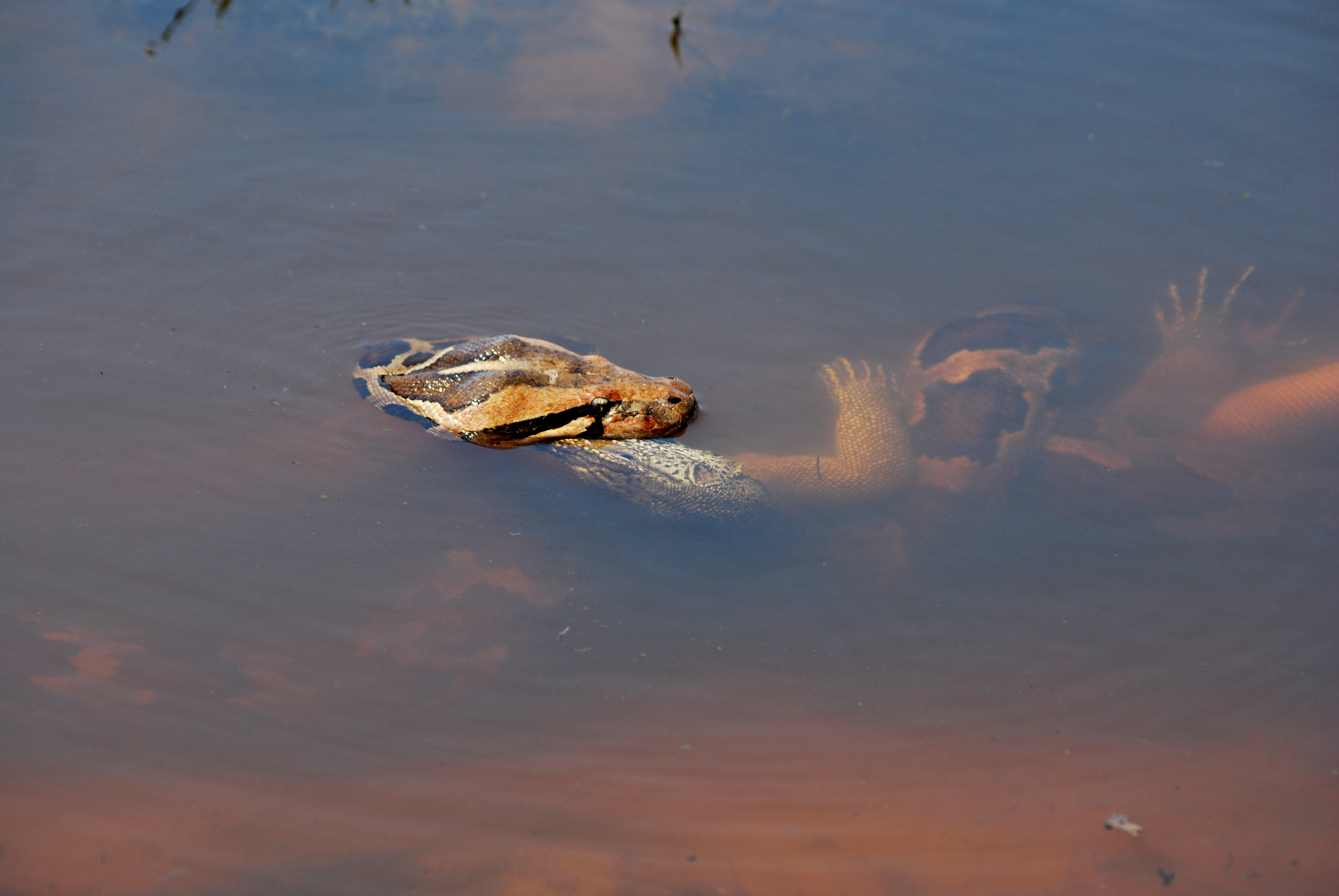
Being eaten by an Indian python, in Sri Lanka

They are usually shy and avoid humans. They have keen eyesight and can detect human movement nearly 250 m away. When caught, a few individuals may bite, but rarely do so.

Captives have been known to live for nearly 22 years. Predators of adults include pythons, mammalian predators and birds. A number of ectoparasites and endoparasites are recorded.

=== Reproduction ===
Females may be able to retain sperm, and females held in confinement have been able to lay fertile eggs. The main breeding season is June to September, but males begin to show combat behaviour by April. Females dig a nest hole in level ground or a vertical bank and lay the eggs inside, filling it up and using their snouts to compact the soil. The females often dig false nests nearby and shovel soil around the area. They sometimes make use of a termite mound to nest. A single clutch of about 20 eggs is laid. The eggs hatch in 168 to nearly as long as 254 days. About 40-80% of the eggs may hatch.

=== Locomotion ===
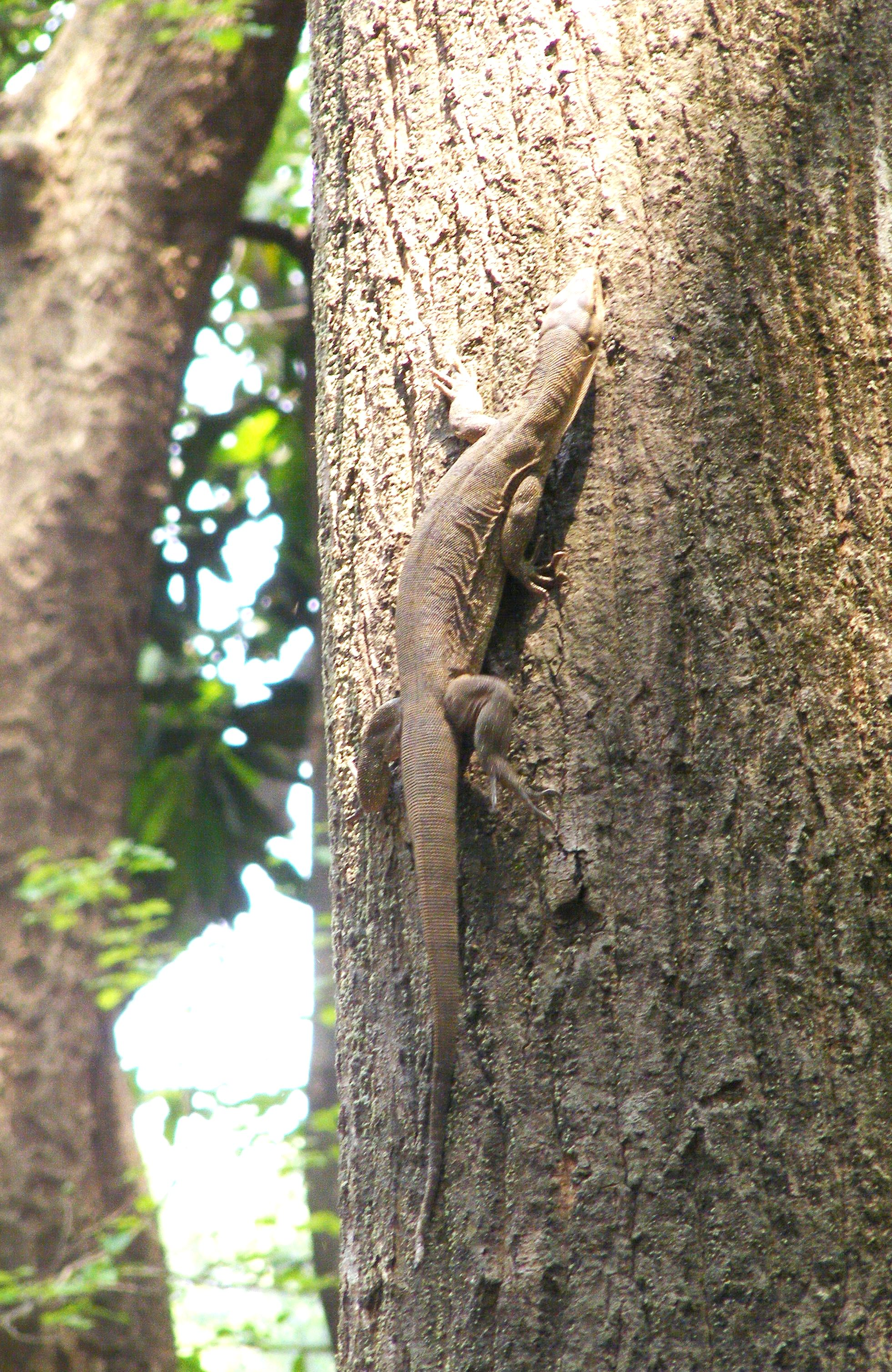
Bengal monitor climbing a tree

The Bengal monitor is capable of rapid movement on the ground. Small individuals may climb trees to escape, but larger ones prefer to escape on the ground. They can climb well. On the ground, they sometimes stand on the hind legs to get a better view or when males fight other males. They can also swim well and can stay submerged for at least 17 minutes. It uses both trees and bushes for shelter.

=== Feeding ===
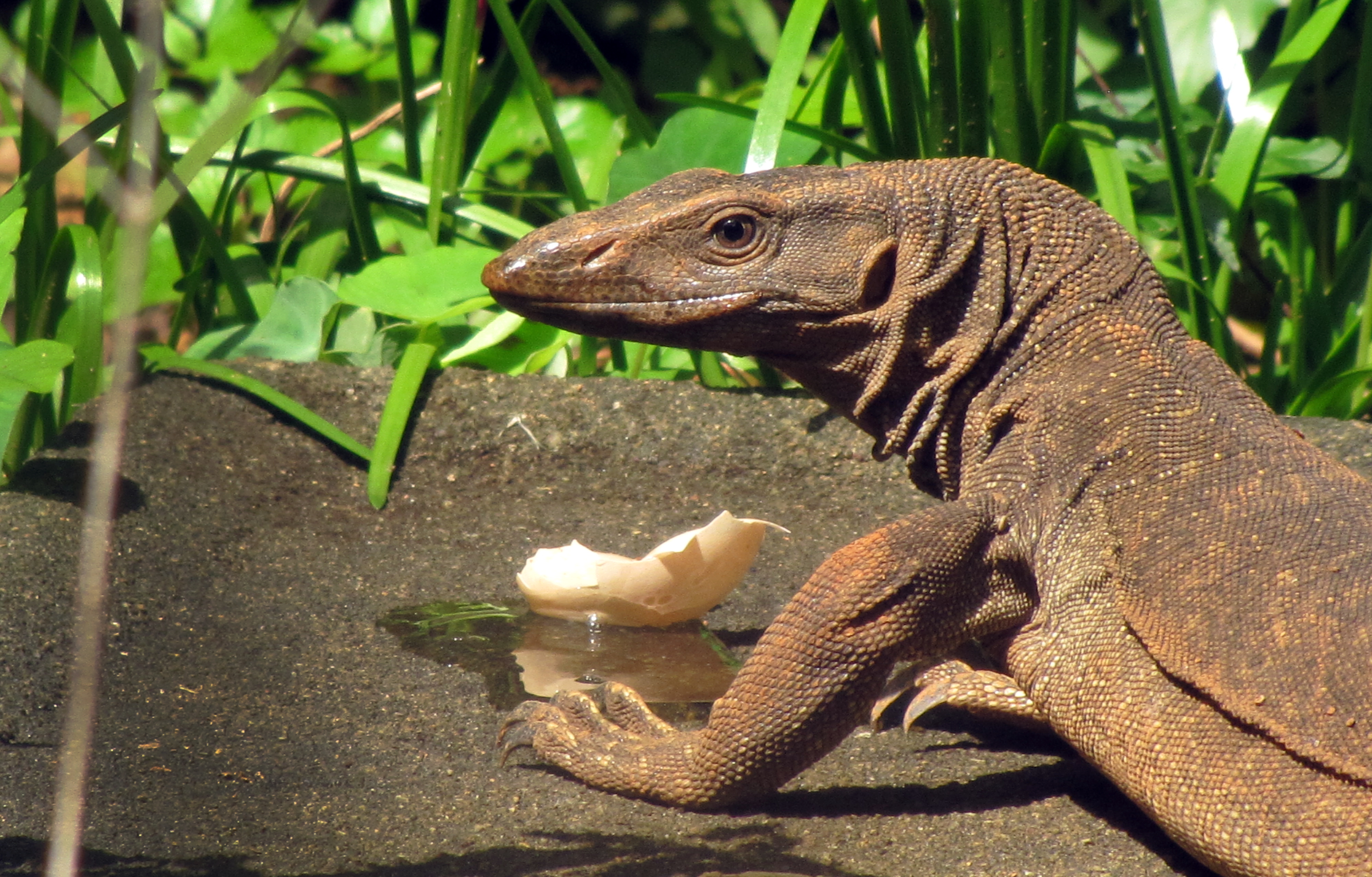
Eating egg

Bengal monitors tend to remain active the whole day. Large adults may ascend vertical tree trunks, where they sometimes stalk and capture roosting bats. The species is a generalist, and feeds on a varied diet of invertebrates and vertebrates. Invertebrate prey mostly consists of beetles and their larvae followed by orthopterans, but also maggots, caterpillars, centipedes, scorpions, crabs, crayfish, snails, termites, ants, and earwigs. Larger individuals in addition to invertebrates also eat a large amount of vertebrate prey, including toads and frogs and their eggs, fish, lizards, snakes, rats, squirrels, hares, musk shrews, and birds. Hares and rodents such as Lesser bandicoot rats are often caught by digging them out of their nests. Diet may differ based on season and locality, for example, they often forage for fish and aquatic insects in streams during the summer, and individuals in Andhra Pradesh eat mostly frogs and toads.

Bengal monitors also scavenge carrion and sometimes congregate when feeding on large carcasses such as that of deer. In areas where livestock are common, they often seek out dung to forage for beetles and other insects.

== Conservation ==
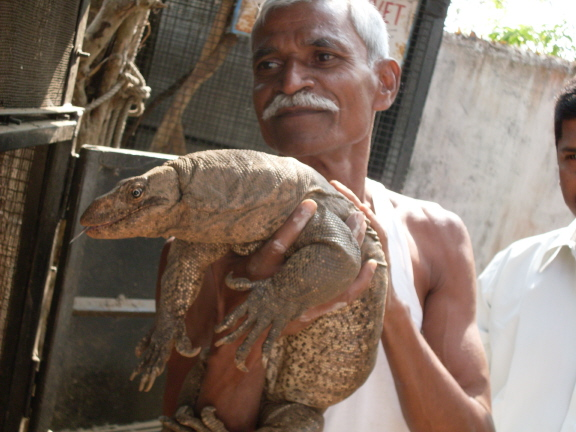
Injured Bengal monitor being nursed at the Lok Biradari Prakalp in India

The Bengal monitor is listed on Schedule I of the Wild Life (Protection) Act, 1972 and on Appendix I of CITES. The Bengal monitor has been assessed as Least Concern on the IUCN Red List; the wild population is decreasing as it is hunted for both consumption and medicinal purposes as well as for the skin. It is threatened by agricultural pollution, as pesticides reduce the availability of prey. In Iran, it is also sometimes killed due to being seen as a dangerous threat.

The dried and dyed hemipenes of Bengal monitors are frequently trafficked and illegally sold in India and online under the deceptive term 'Hatha Jodi', where it is claimed to be the root of a supposed rare Himalayan plant in order to fool buyers and retailers, and to disguise the trade from wildlife authorities. Sellers advertise 'Hatha Jodi' as having the tantric power to bring wealth, power and contentment. A pair of hemipenes may sell at a value of up to US$250.

In India, the body oil of monitor lizards is sold for thousands of Indian rupees to residents in metropolitan cities as a treatment for rheumatism.

== In culture ==
The Bengal monitor is known as Bis-cobra in western India, Goyrā in Rajasthan, Godhi in Odisha, Guishap or Goshap in Bangladesh and West Bengal, Goh in both Punjab, India, Punjab, Pakistan and Bihar, as Ghorpad in Maharashtra and as Thalagoya in Sri Lanka. Folk mythology across the region includes the idea that these lizards, though actually harmless, are venomous, and in Rajasthan, the locals believe that the lizards become venomous only during the rainy season. Monitor lizards are hunted, and their body fat, extracted by boiling, is used in a wide range of folk remedies.

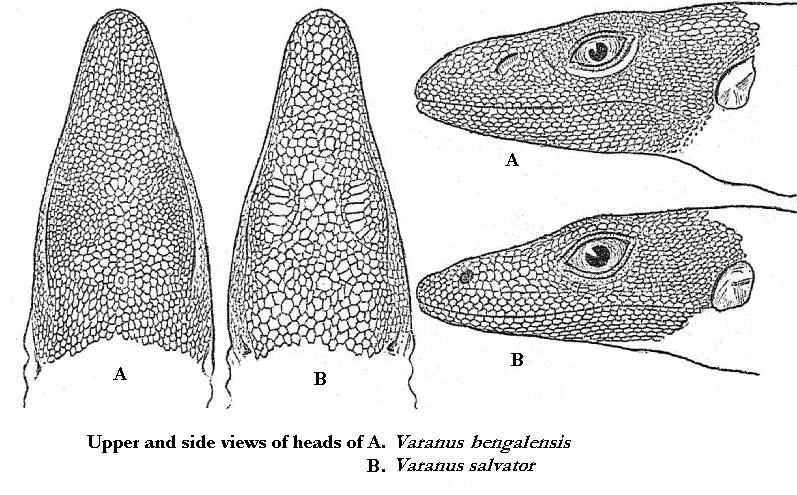
Comparison to Asian water monitor (Varanus salvator)

In Sri Lanka, the Bengal monitor is considered harmless and rather defenseless. Land monitor meat is considered edible, especially by indigenous Vedda and Rodiya peoples. Killing a land monitor is considered a cowardly act and this is frequently referred to in folklore along with other harmless reptiles.

A clan in Maharashtra called Ghorpade claims that the name is derived from a legendary founder Tanaji Malusare who supposedly scaled a fort wall using a monitor lizard tied to a rope.

The Bengal monitor's belly skin has traditionally been used in making the drum head for the kanjira, a South Indian percussion instrument.
