= Mauganj Assembly constituency =

Constituency of the Madhya Pradesh legislative assembly in India

Coordinates: 24.67°N 81.88°E

Mauganj
- Constituency No. 71 for the Madhya Pradesh Legislative Assembly

Constituency details
- Country: India
- Region: Central India
- State: Madhya Pradesh
- District: Rewa
- Lok Sabha constituency: Rewa
- Established: 1957
- Reservation: None

Member of Legislative Assembly
- 16th Madhya Pradesh Legislative Assembly
- Incumbent Pradeep Patel
- Party: Bharatiya Janata Party
- Elected year: 2023
- Preceded by: Sukhendra Singh

Mauganj Assembly constituency is one of the 230 Vidhan Sabha (Legislative Assembly) constituencies of Madhya Pradesh state in central India.

It is part of Rewa district.

== Members of the Legislative Assembly ==
Election	Member	Party
1957	Sahadeo	Indian National Congress
1962	Chhotelal	Indian National Congress
1967	J. Prasad	Bharatiya Jana Sangh
1972	Ramdhani Mishra	Indian National Congress
1977	Achyutanand Mishra	Indian National Congress
1980	Achyutanand Mishra	Indian National Congress
1985	Jagdish Tiwari Masuriha	Bharatiya Janata Party
1990	Udai Prakash Mishra	Indian National Congress
1993	I.M.P. Verma	Bahujan Samaj Party
1998	I.M.P. Verma	Bahujan Samaj Party
2003	I.M.P. Verma	Bahujan Samaj Party
2008	Laxman Tiwari	Bharatiya Janshakti Party
2013	Sukhendra Singh	Indian National Congress
2018	Pradeep Patel	Bharatiya Janata Party
2023	Pradeep Patel	Bharatiya Janata Party

== Election results ==
=== 2023 ===
2023 Madhya Pradesh Legislative Assembly election: Mauganj
Party	Candidate	Votes	%	±%
BJP	Pradeep Patel	70,119	45.14	+9.76
INC	Sukhendra Singh Banna	62,945	40.52	+13.36
BSP	Bhaiyalal Kol	12,396	7.98	−13.07
AAP	Pandit Umesh Tripathi Ghurehata	3,747	2.41	+1.93
NOTA	None of the above	1,473	0.95	+0.38
Majority		7,174	4.62	−3.6
Turnout		155,341	68.16	+1.18
BJP hold		Swing		

=== 2018 ===
2018 Madhya Pradesh Legislative Assembly election: Mauganj
Party	Candidate	Votes	%	±%
BJP	Pradeep Patel	47,753	35.38	
INC	Sukhendra Singh Banna	36,661	27.16	
BSP	Mrigendra Singh	28,413	21.05	
Independent	Laxman Tiwari	10,372	7.69	
Independent	Heeramani Dipankar	2,691	1.99	
Independent	Heeralal Yadav Radhe-Radhe Kailashpur	1,220	0.9	
NOTA	None of the above	776	0.57	
Majority		11,092	8.22	
Turnout		134,960	66.98	
BJP gain from		Swing		

== See also ==
- Mauganj
