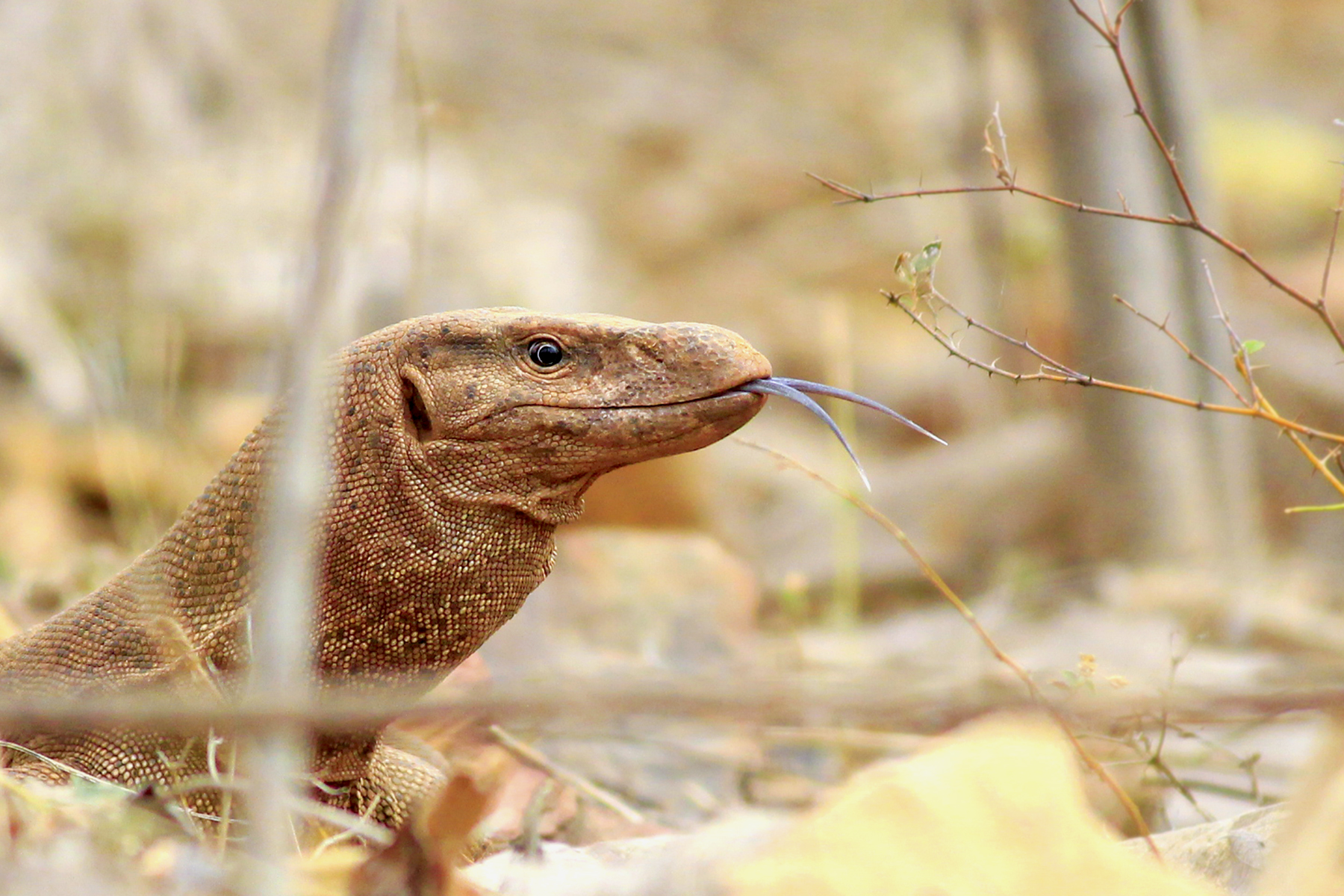
- Bengal monitor

Scientific classification
- Kingdom: Animalia
- Phylum: Chordata
- Class: Reptilia
- Order: Squamata
- Suborder: Anguimorpha
- Family: Varanidae
- Genus: Varanus
- Subgenus: Empagusia

Species
- V. bengalensis; V. dumerilii; V. flavescens; V. nebulosus

= Varanus (Empagusia) =

Subgenus of lizards

Empagusia is a subgenus of monitor lizards in South to Southeast Asia, which includes medium to large species.

== Classification ==
The black rough-necked monitor (V. rudicollis) was previously part of this subgenus, but genomic analyses show that it is actually the basalmost member of the closely related subgenus Soterosaurus, also known as the water monitors.

== Species ==
Species	Image
Bengal monitor (V. bengalensis)	
Dumeril's monitor (V. dumerilii)	
Yellow monitor (V. flavescens)	
Clouded monitor (V. nebulosus)	
