= Sengar =

Clan of Rajputs in India

Sengar are a clan of Rajputs.

The central Indian state Madhya Pradesh was the location of battles and lesser-known rule of the Sengar Rajputs. In the eleventh century CE, they migrated from Jalaun to the fertile area of Rewa district known as Mauganj. They constructed garhis (forts) in Mauganj, Nai Garhi, Mangawan, and Bichhrata that was historically known as 'Mau Raj'. This kingdom battled and survived the invasion of the Kalachuris.

Accordingly, Sengars were the offsprings of a Brahmin named Singhi who was the son-in-law of Gaharwar raja of Kannauj, married to his daughter Shanta. Singhi had two sons, from one son Gautam Rajputs were descended and from the other son Sengar Rajputs were descended.
