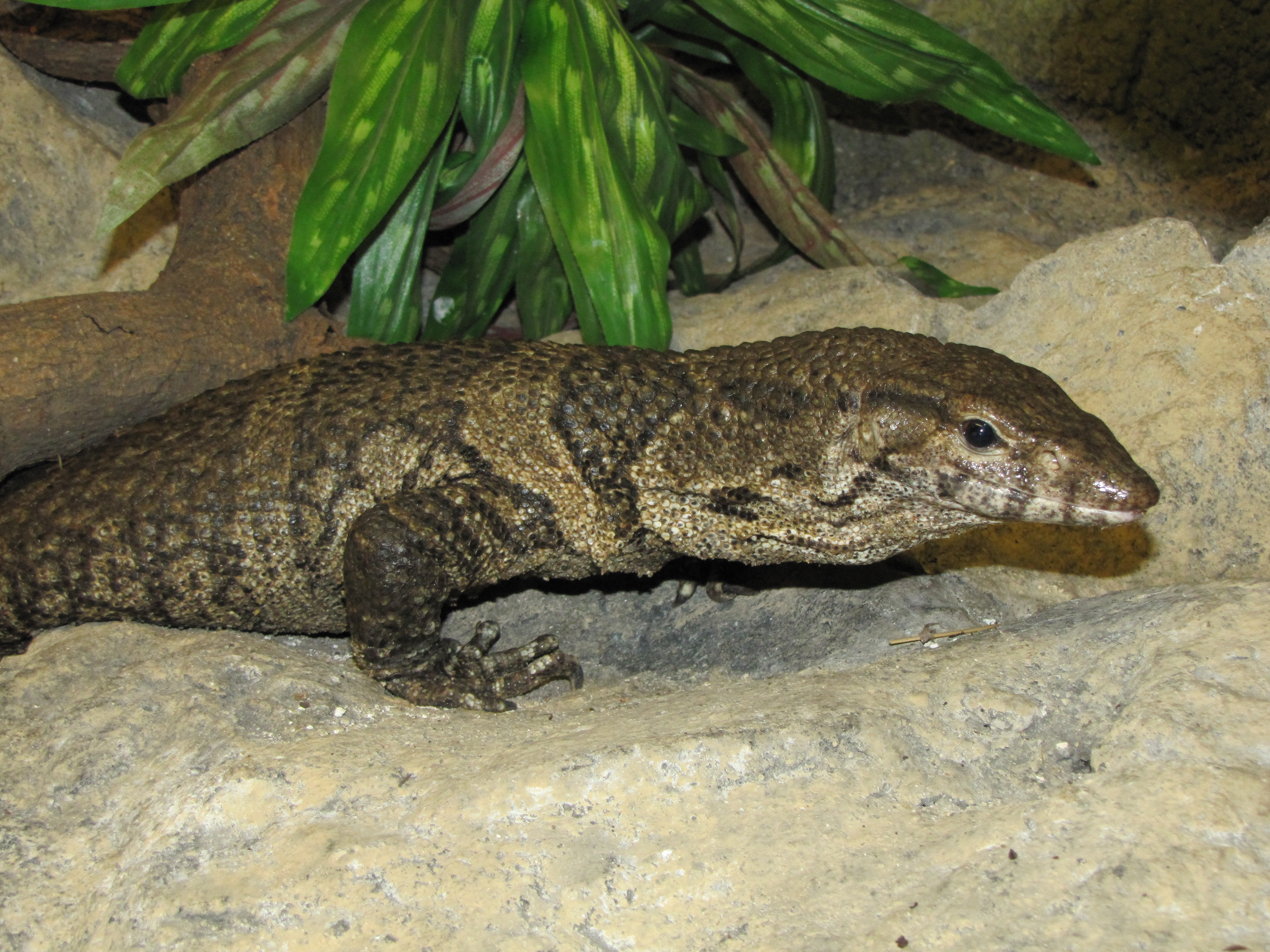
- Varanus dumerilii in Sofia Zoo

Conservation status
- Data Deficient (IUCN 3.1)
- CITES Appendix II

Scientific classification
- Kingdom: Animalia
- Phylum: Chordata
- Class: Reptilia
- Order: Squamata
- Suborder: Anguimorpha
- Family: Varanidae
- Genus: Varanus
- Subgenus: Empagusia
- Species: V. dumerilii

Binomial name
- Varanus dumerilii (Schlegel, 1839)

Synonyms
- Monitor dumerilii Schlegel, 1839; Varanus dumerilii — Bleeker, 1858

= Dumeril's monitor =

Species of lizard

Dumeril's monitor (Varanus dumerilii), also known as the brown rough-necked monitor, is a species of lizard in the family Varanidae. The species is endemic to Southeast Asia.

== Etymology ==
The specific name, dumerilii, is in honour of French zoologist André Marie Constant Duméril.

In Thailand, V. dumerilii is known by the common name, túdtū̀ (ตุ๊ดตู่), which is an animal that appeared in children's folk songs.

== Taxonomy ==
Varanus dumerilii is a species of monitor lizard within the subgenus Empagusia.

=== Subspecies "Varanus dumerilii heteropholis" ===
Two subspecies have been historically described:

- Varanus dumerilii dumerilii (Schlegel, 1839)
- Varanus dumerilii heteropholis Boulenger, 1892

In 1892, the species V. heteropholis was named by Boulenger on the basis of a taxidermied and possibly tanned specimen owned by Charles Hose, collected from Borneo's Mt. Dulit. The same taxonomic label was attached to two additional specimens from the same locality. In 1942, Mertens listed it instead as V. d. heteropholis, as a subspecies of V. dumerilii.

In 1993, Sprackland classified V. d. heteropholis as a synonym of V. d. dumerilii, after examining specimens including the holotypes of both putative subspecies. Although the appearance of the V. d. heteropholis holotype was considered somewhat strange even when accounting for the alterations caused by the taxidermy process, the traits previously described as unique to V. d. heteropholis were found to fit within the range of variation in V. d. dumerilii, albeit on the extreme ends, such that V. dumerilii has no subspecies.

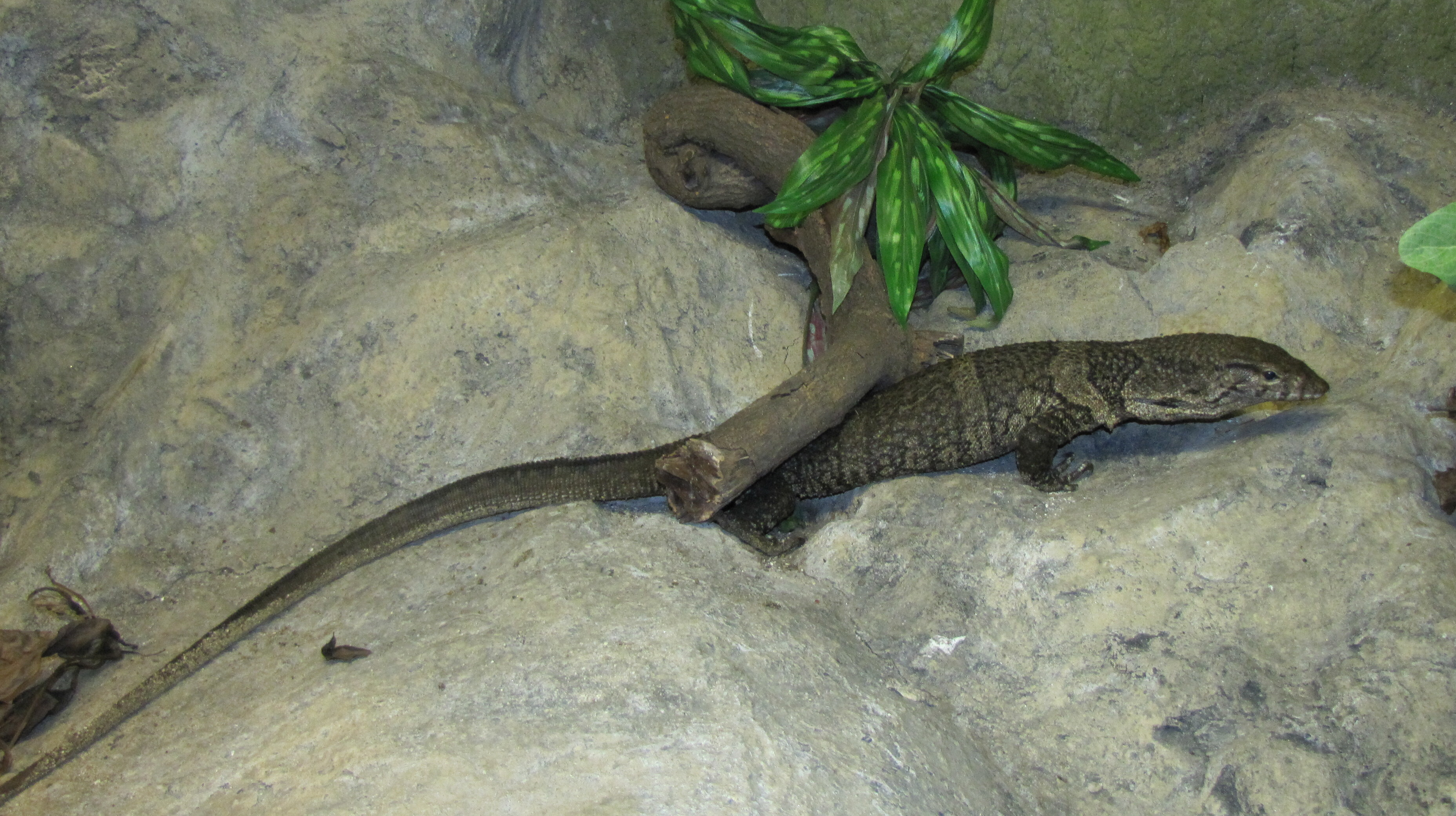
In Sofia Zoo

== Distribution ==
Dumeril's monitor is found in southern Burma and north of the Isthmus of Kra to Kanchanaburi Province in Thailand, as well as in Peninsular Malaysia, Singapore, throughout Borneo, Sumatra, Riau, Bangka–Belitung and other smaller islands of Indonesia.

== Habitat ==
The preferred natural habitat of V. dumerilii is dense evergreen forests with high humidity and mangrove swamps, at altitudes from sea level to 900 m (3,000 ft).

== Description ==
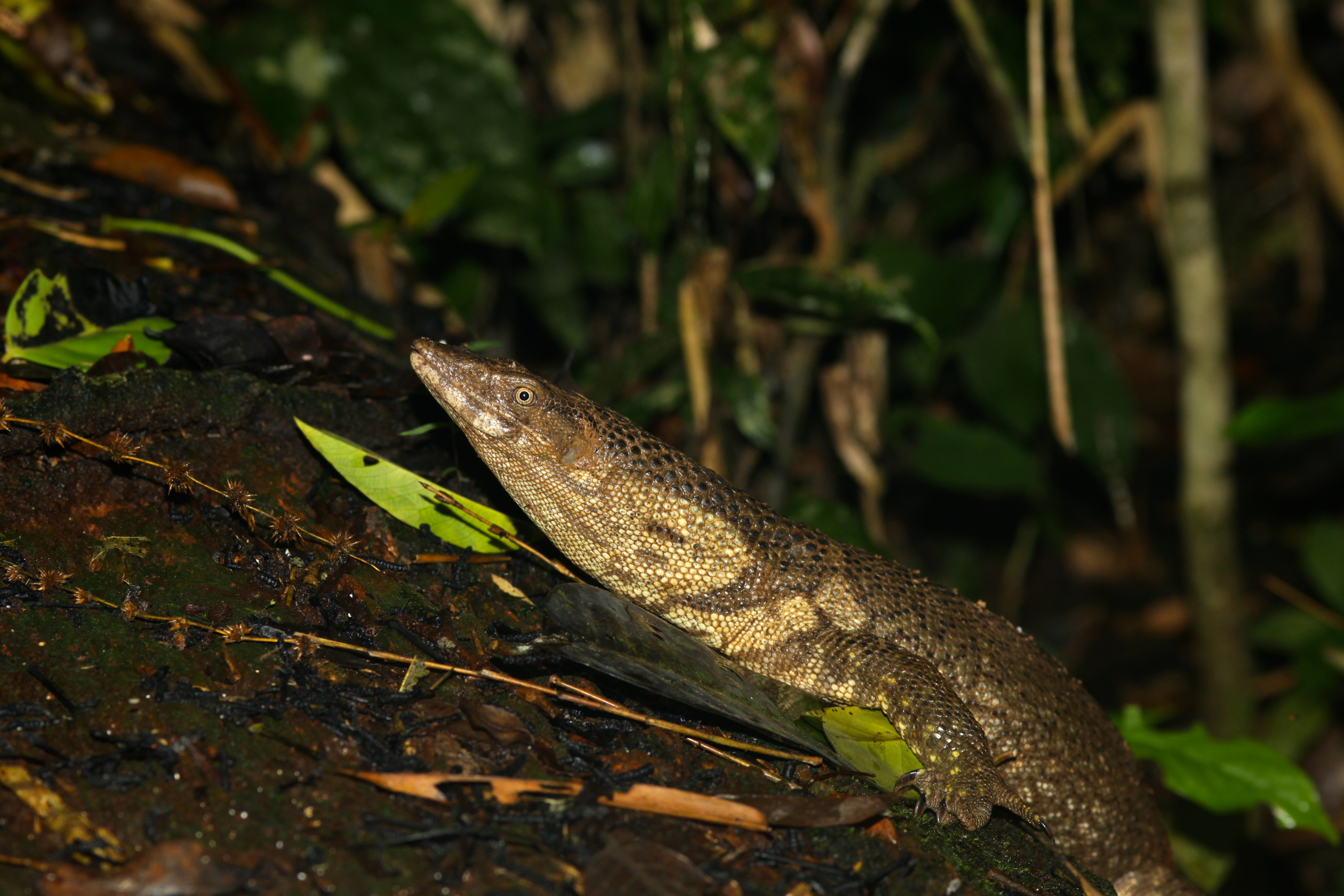
In the wild, Pahang, Malaysia

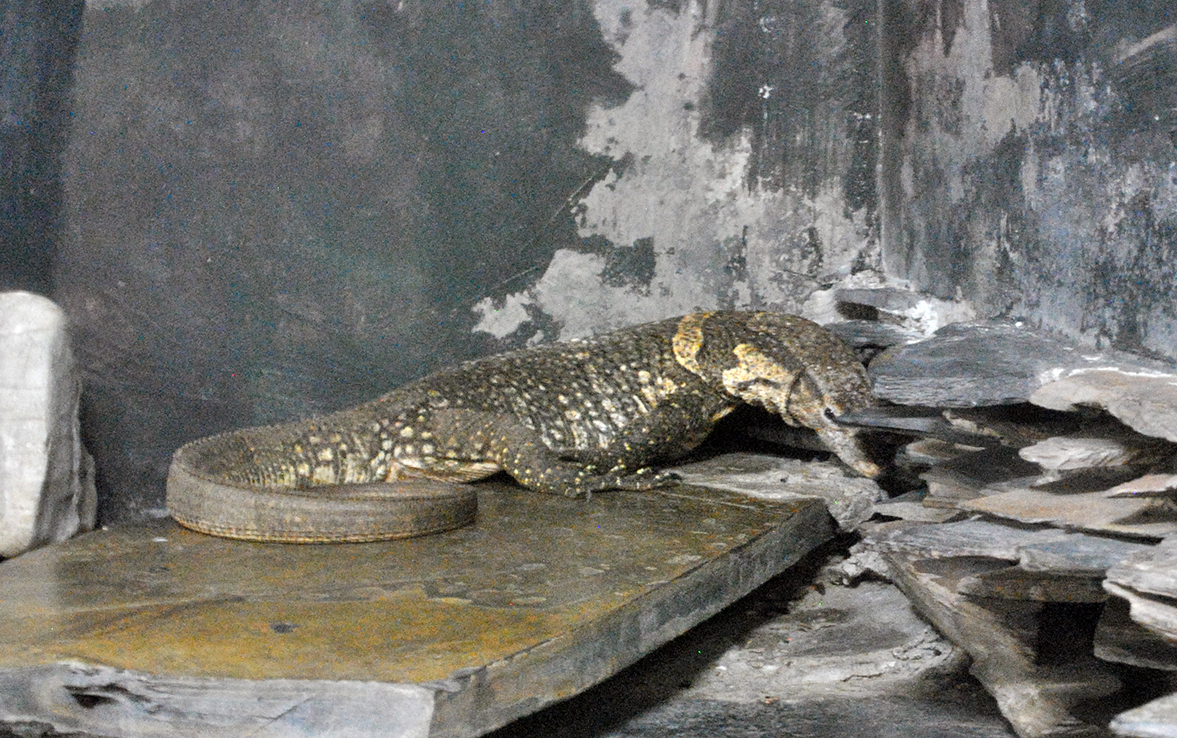
In Pata Zoo

Adult Dumeril's monitors can reach up to 4.5 ft (1.4 m) in total length (including tail) although typical total length is 4 ft (1.2 m).

Adult Dumeril's monitors are largely dark brown, with occasional brighter indistinct crossbars. "The major color is a dark varnish black which is interrupted by several yellow crossways bars on the back." The head of juveniles is shiny orange-red or sometimes yellow. This juvenile coloration disappears after only 4–8 weeks.

The long tail is laterally compressed with a keel.

It is at times confused with the sympatric black rough-necked monitor due to the large nuchal scales in both species, which is why Dumeril's monitors are sometimes called brown rough-necked monitors.

== Diet ==
V. dumerilii is a crab specialist; however, it has been observed eating snails, other molluscs, insects, fish, frogs, turtle eggs, birds, and smaller rodents. Little is known overall about this species compared to other monitor lizards.

== Behavior ==
V. dumerilii is arboreal and diurnal.

== Reproduction ==
V. dumerilii is oviparous. Clutch size is 4–23 eggs, with up to 3 clutches a year. Hatchlings have a snout-to-vent length (SVL) of about 8 cm (3.1 in), and a tail slightly longer than SVL.

== Conservation ==
The species has been successfully bred in captivity, ie, both in zoos and private collections. Due to its demand in the pet trade, and because it is not a nationally protected species within Indonesia, Indonesia has exported up to 1,060 individuals per year between 2010 and 2018. The EU has prohibited the import of wild caught specimens since 1997. The species has been regularly collected for the pet trade since around 1976.
