= Achyutanand Mishra =

Indian politician

Achyutanand Mishra (Hindi: अच्युतानंद मिश्र(d.1999)) was an Indian politician from the state of Madhya Pradesh of India. He had been an M.L.A from Mauganj (Vidhan Sabha constituency) to Madhya Pradesh Legislative Assembly 1957 as an independent candidate and later from Indian National Congress in 1977.
