= Sukhendra Singh =

Indian politician

Member of the Madhya Pradesh Legislative Assembly
- Incumbent
- Assumed office 2013
- Constituency: Mauganj

Personal details
- Born: Village Banna Jawahar Singh, Rewa district
- Party: Indian National Congress
- Education: B.A.
- Profession: Politician
- As of 27 July, 2018 Source: ["Biography:Singh, Sukhendra" (PDF). Madhya Pradesh Legislative Assembly.]

Sukhendra Singh is an Indian politician and a member of the Indian National Congress party.He

== Political career ==
In 1995, he started his political journey by becoming Vice-President of District IYC and then became the President in 2010.

Since 2008 he is the president of District Co-op Bank, Rewa. He became an MLA for the first time in 2013.

== Legal affairs ==
He was booked for beating up CCF IFS P. K. Singh in 2017 along with his supporters.

== See also ==
- Madhya Pradesh Legislative Assembly
- 2013 Madhya Pradesh Legislative Assembly election
