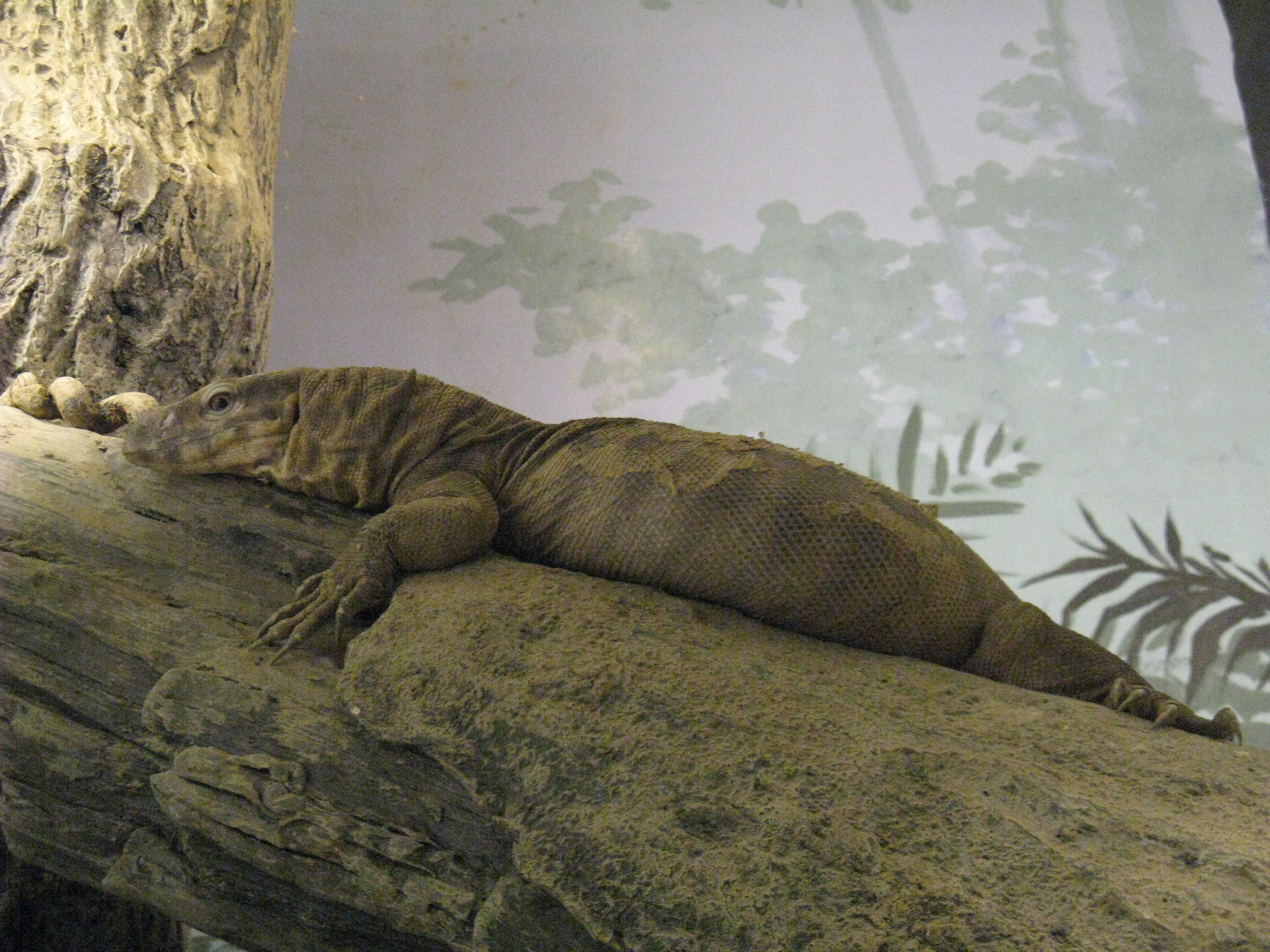

Conservation status
- Endangered (IUCN 3.1)
- CITES Appendix I

Scientific classification
- Kingdom: Animalia
- Phylum: Chordata
- Order: Squamata
- Suborder: Anguimorpha
- Family: Varanidae
- Genus: Varanus
- Subgenus: Empagusia
- Species: V. flavescens

Binomial name
- Varanus flavescens (Hardwicke & Gray, 1827)

= Yellow monitor =

Species of lizard

The yellow monitor (Varanus flavescens) or golden monitor is a monitor lizard native to South Asia.

== Description ==
The yellow monitor is a medium-sized monitor, measuring between 45 and 95 cm (18 and 37 in) including the tail and weighing up to 1.45 kg (3.2 lb). It has subcorneal teeth, scarcely compressed. Its snout is short and convex, measuring a little less than the distance from the anterior border of the orbit to the anterior border of the ear; canthus rostralis distinct. Its nostril is an oblique slit, a little nearer to the end of the snout than to the orbit. The digits are short with the length of the fourth toe, measured from its articulation with the tarsus to the base of the claw, not exceeding the length of the femur. The tail of the yellow monitor is feebly compressed and keeled above. The head scales are small and subequal; the median series of supraocular scales slightly dilated transversely. The scales on upper surfaces are moderate, oval and keeled. Abdominal scales are smooth and in 65 to 75 transverse rows. Caudal scales are keeled; the caudal keel with a very low, doubly toothed crest. Adults are olive or yellowish brown above, with irregular darker markings which are generally confluent into broad cross bars; a blackish temporal streak; lower surfaces yellowish, with rather indistinct brown cross bars, which are most distinct on the throat. Young individuals are dark brown above, with yellow spots confluent into crossbars; lower surfaces yellow, with dark brown cross bars.

Each tooth position has only a single replacement teeth in waiting at any given time.

== Distribution and habitat ==
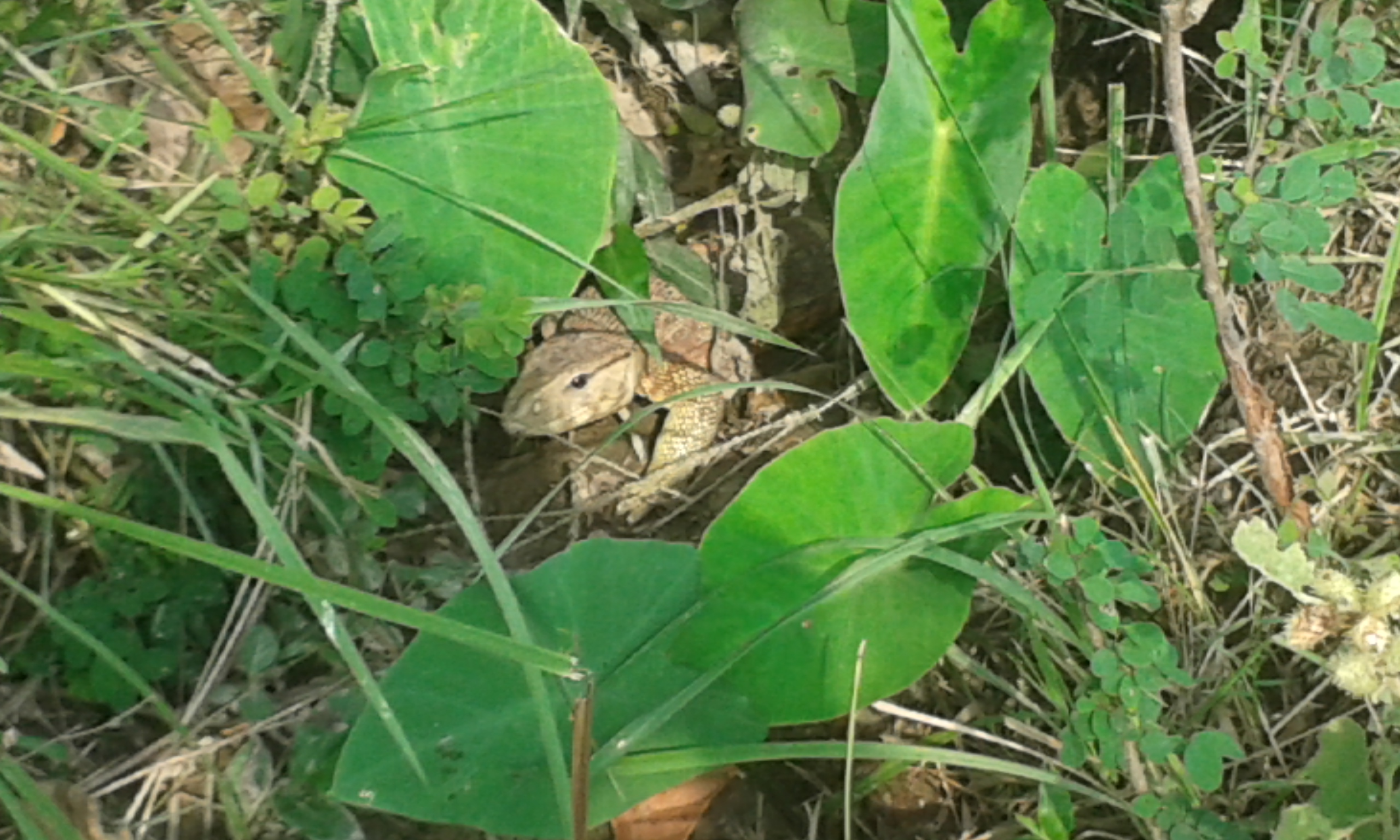
In Terai, Nepal

The yellow monitor occurs in the flood plains of the Indus, Ganges and Brahmaputra rivers in India, Pakistan, Nepal and Bangladesh. It inhabits wet areas, the edges of forest and vicinity of human settlements and agricultural land. Due to its short hind toes, it is not efficient at climbing trees.

== Behaviour and ecology ==
The yellow monitors thermoregulates by moving between sunny and shady areas, similar to other diurnal lizards. There is also one report of a yellow monitor lying on a pile of hot ash left by a human-lit fire, seemingly to gain heat from it.

It may be capable of play behaviour. A yellow monitor in a wetland was observed alternating between swimming in a vertical position and floating motionlessly.

== Threats ==
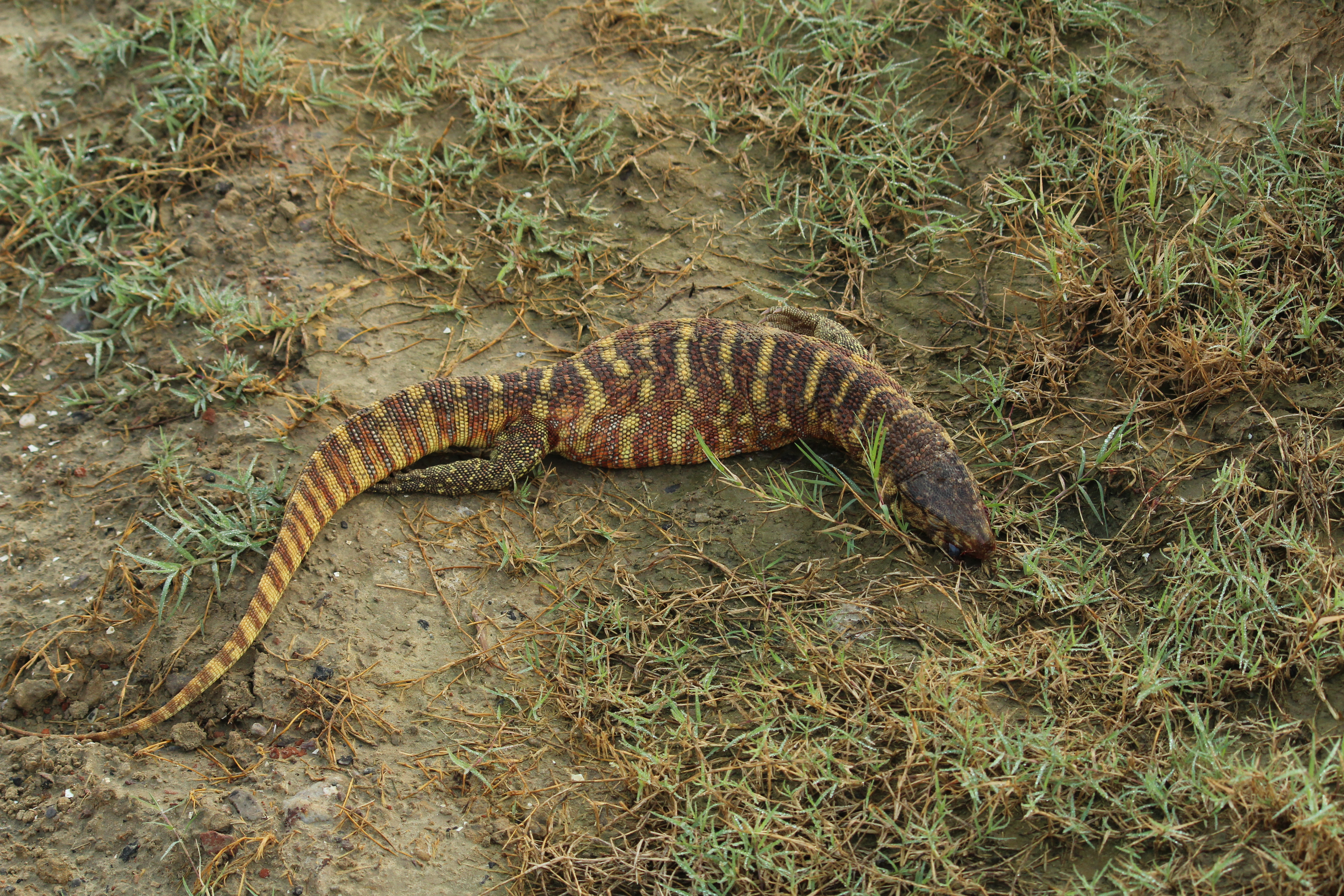
A carcass of a yellow monitor in Basai Wetland, India

The yellow monitor is threatened by hunting for its meat and skin in all range countries. Its preferred habitat is threatened due to encroachment, pollution and conversion to landfills. Direct killing is the major threat to the yellow monitor in Kanchanpur District of far-western Nepal, as local people are afraid of it. It is also used as food, for medicinal purpose, and its skin has been offered for sale in wildlife markets..

== Conservation ==
International trade of the yellow monitor is regulated under CITES Appendix I; it is listed as a legally protected species in India under Schedule I of the Wild Life (Protection) Act, 1972, in Nepal under the National Parks and Wildlife Conservation Act 1973, and in Bangladesh under the Wildlife (Conservation and Security) Act 2012.
