= Mauganj =

- town
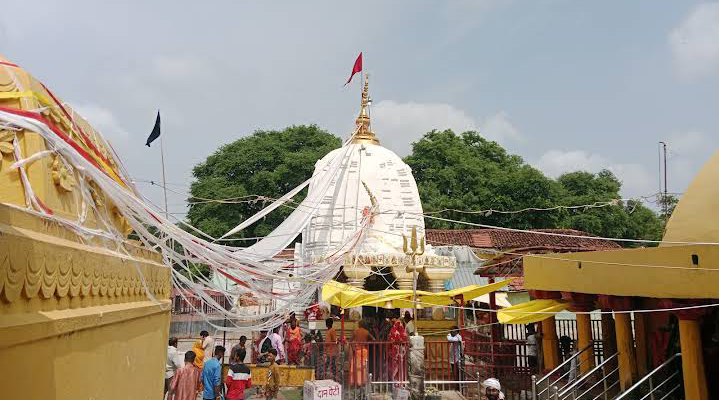
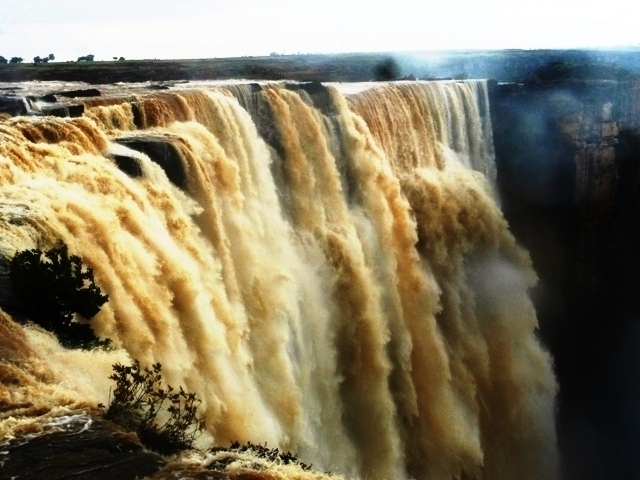
- Bahuti Water fall, Shiv Temple, near Mauganj

- Location in Madhya Pradesh, India Mauganj (India)
- Coordinates: 24.68°N 81.88°E
- Country: India
- State: Madhya Pradesh
- District: Mauganj
- Elevation: 313 m (1,027 ft)

Population (2001)
  - Total: 26,420

Languages
- Time zone: UTC+5:30 (IST)
- PIN: 486331
- ISO 3166 code: IN-MP
- Vehicle registration: MP17MP

Mauganj is the administrative headquarter of Mauganj district in Madhya Pradesh.Bagheli is the regional language of Mauganj. Mauganj is the seat of legislative assembly in Madhya Pradesh. Its nearest towns are Manikwar, Hanumana, Deotalab, Naigadhi.

== History ==
The historical roots of Mauganj can be traced back to the eleventh century, marked by the arrival of the Sengar clan of Rajputs in this agriculturally rich region situated in North-Eastern Madhya Pradesh. Previously known as 'Mau Raj,' the region was governed by the Sengar kings, who established their presence and constructed fortifications in Mauganj., Mangawan and Bicchrahta.

The Sengar arrived in the region from Jalaun and governed this small kingdom, notably defending it against the Kalachuris. However, in the fourteenth century, the Baghelas invaded Mau Raj, defeating the Sengars in the battle of Mau and destroying their fort, ultimately annexing it to the kingdom of Bagelkhand. The Sengar descendants later constructed a new fortress called Nai Garhi, meaning 'a new fortress'.

== Geography ==
Mauganj is located at 24.68°N 81.88°E. It has an average elevation of 313 metres (1,026 feet). Mauganj is 65 km from Rewa Divisional Headquarter.

== Demographics ==
As of 2011 India census, Mauganj had a population of 26,420. Males constitute 52% of the population and females 48%. Mauganj has an average literacy rate of 52%, lower than the national average of 59.5%: male literacy is 63%, and female literacy is 41%. In Mauganj, 18% of the population is under 6 years of age.

== Economy ==
Mauganj's economy is primarily agricultural, with onion, wheat and paddy being major crops. There are efforts to promote crop diversification, including the introduction of new crops and improved farming techniques.

=== Industrial Park ===
Madhya Pradesh Industrial Development Corporation has established an industrial park in Ghurheta, Mauganj. There are also plans for the construction and development of an industrial park at Mauganj. The Patanjali Group is proposing a large investment, which is expected to create jobs and boost the local economy.

== Places of attraction ==
Some sites of religious significance around Mauganj are:

- Mahadev Temple in Devatalab (17 km from Mauganj)
- Shree Hanuman Temple, Deodhara (16 km SW of Mauganj)
- Asht Bhuji temple
- Hanuman Mandir, Gytri Mandir, Ram Janki Mandir and Alopan Mandir
- Bauli Hanuman Ji Mandir (Manikwar)
- Thadi Pathar Devi Mandir (Bavangarh)25 Km From Mauganj

== Transport ==
By air Nearest airport is in Prayagraj, Uttar Pradesh.

By bus Bus stand is available in the city bus stand Mauganj. Mauganj is connected by private bus services to all nearest major cities.

By Train Nearest railway station is Rewa Station (Madhya Pradesh)
