= Rewa Sunderja Mango =

Mango cultivar from Madhya Pradesh, India

Mangifera 'Rewa Sunderja Mango'
- Genus: Mangifera
- Species: Mangifera indica
- Cultivar: 'Rewa Sunderja Mango'
- Origin: India

The 'Rewa Sunderja' mango, is a mango cultivar primarily grown in Govindgarh of Rewa district, Madhya Pradesh, India.

== Description ==
Sunderja mango is distinctively fibre-free and has a unique sugar profile.

== Origins ==
It was developed through meticulous cross-breeding of select mango varieties by Maharaja Venkat Raman Singh (b. 1876, r. 1880–1918) of the princely state of Rewa at Govindgarh.

== Geographical indication ==
It was awarded the Geographical Indication (GI) status tag from the Geographical Indications Registry under the Union Government of India on 31 January 2023 (valid until 27 September 2030).

Gofarm Producer Company Limited from Semaria proposed the GI registration of the Rewa Sunderja Mango. After filing the application in 2020, the fruit was granted the GI tag in 2023 by the Geographical Indication Registry in Chennai, making the name "Rewa Sunderja Mango" exclusive to the mangoes grown in the region. It thus became the first mango variety from Madhya Pradesh and the 15th type of goods from Madhya Pradesh to earn the GI tag.

== See also ==
- List of mango cultivars
- List of Geographical Indications in India
