= Princely state =

Indian vassal states under the British Raj

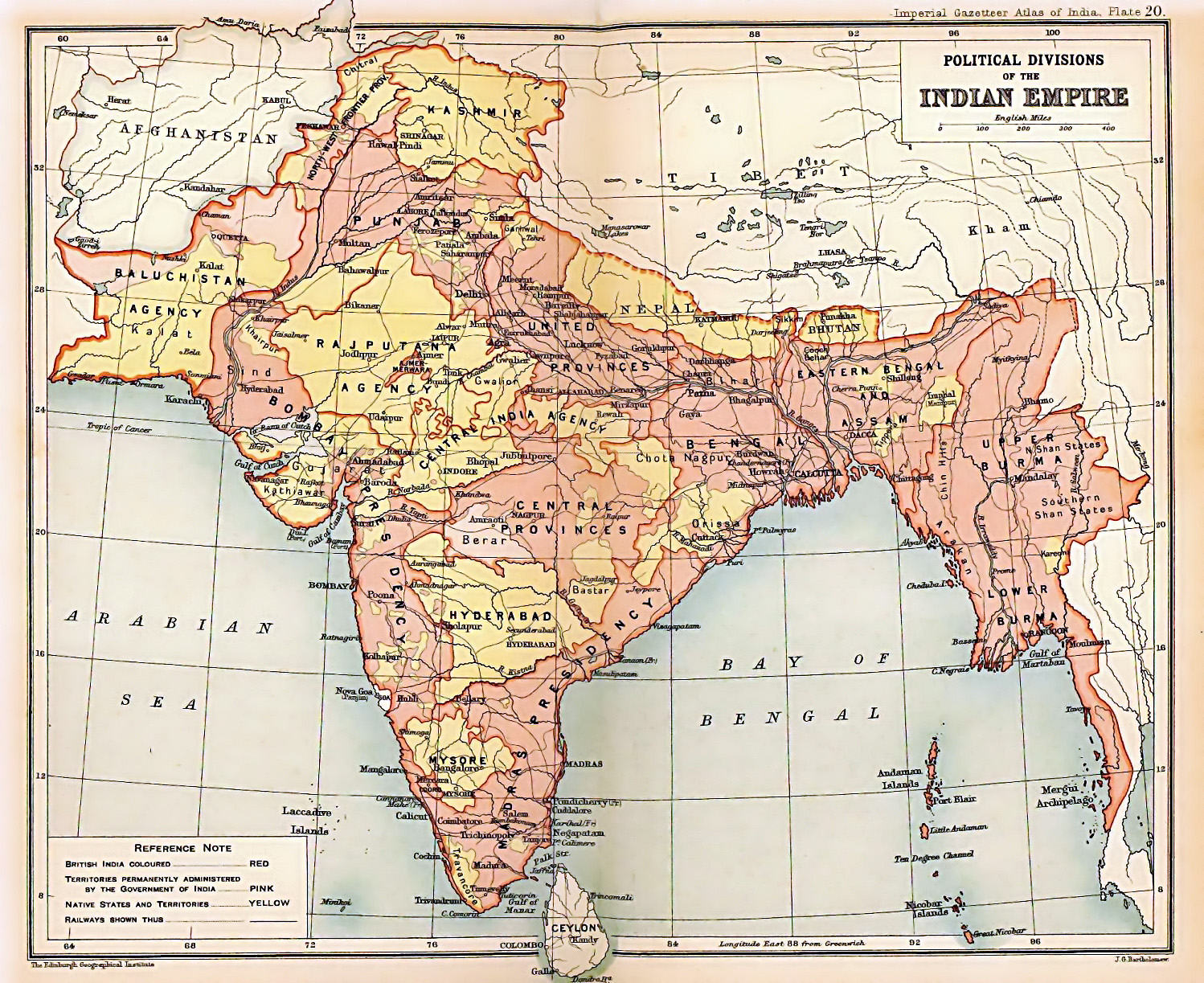
Political subdivisions of the Indian Empire in 1909 with British India (pink) and the princely states (yellow)

A princely state (also called native state) was a nominally sovereign entity of the British Indian Empire that was not directly governed by the British Indian government, but rather by an indigenous ruler under a form of indirect rule, subject to a subsidiary alliance and the suzerainty or paramountcy of the East India Company and subsequently British Crown. The rulers of the princely states were very largely allowed to govern their own territories, but were not allowed relations with states outside the Indian Empire, and were not allowed to fight wars against other princely states. British pressure on the rulers to modernize their domains increased over the period.

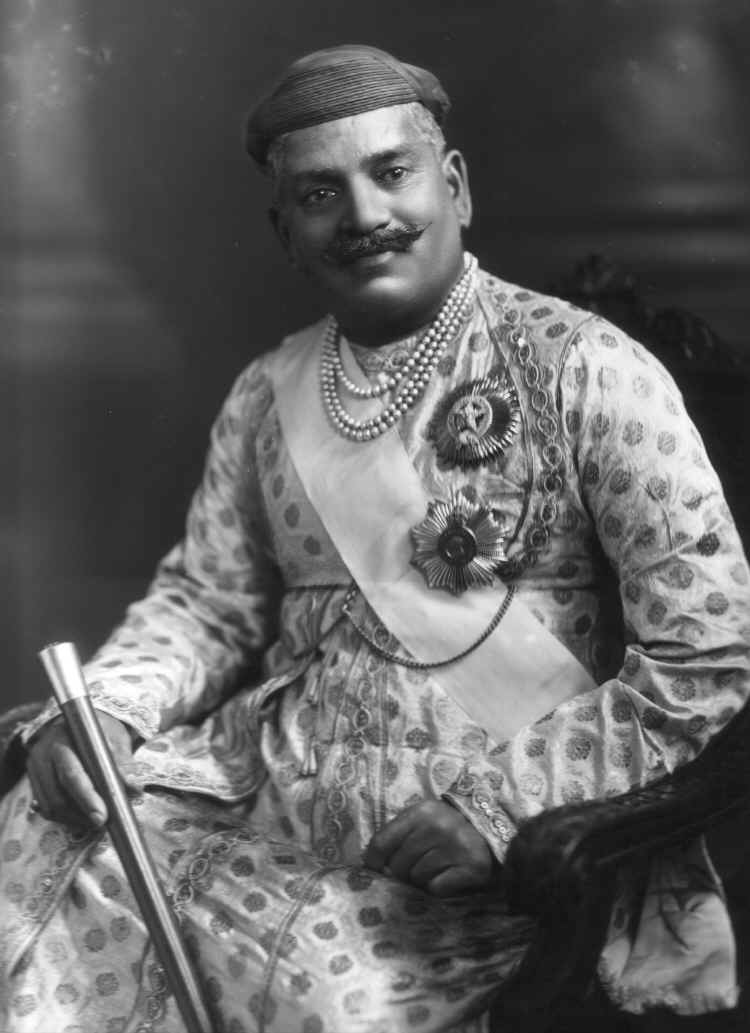
Sayajirao Gaekwad III, The Maharaja of Baroda State

In 1920, the Indian National Congress party under the leadership of Mahatma Gandhi declared swaraj (self-rule) for Indians as its goal and asked the princes of India to establish responsible government. Jawaharlal Nehru played a major role in pushing Congress to confront the princely states and declared in 1929 that "the only people who have the right to determine the future of the Princely States must be the people of these States". In the 1937 Indian provincial elections, the Congress won in most parts of India, excluding the princely states, where there were no elections, as they were not provinces; it started to seek to intervene in the affairs of the states. In the same year, Gandhi played a major role in proposing a federation involving a union between British India and the princely states, with an Indian central government. In 1946, Nehru observed that no princely state could prevail militarily against the army of independent India.

At the time of the British withdrawal, 565 princely states were officially recognized in the Indian Subcontinent, apart from thousands of zamindari estates and jagirs. In 1947, princely states covered 40% of the area of pre-independence India and constituted 23% of its population. The most important princely states had their own Indian political residencies, quasi-diplomatic missions of the British Raj: Hyderabad State, Mysore, Pudukkottai and Travancore in the south, Jammu and Kashmir and Gwalior in the north and Indore in Central India. The most prominent of them – roughly a quarter of the total – had the status of a salute state, one whose ruler was entitled to a set number of gun salutes on ceremonial occasions.

The princely states varied greatly in status, size, and wealth; the premier 21-gun salute states of Hyderabad and Jammu and Kashmir were each over 200,000 km^{2} (77,000 sq mi) in size. In 1941, Hyderabad had a population of over 16 million, while Jammu and Kashmir had a population of slightly over 4 million. At the other end of the scale, the non-salute principality of Lawa covered an area of 49 km^{2} (19 sq mi), with a population of just below 3,000. Some two hundred of the lesser states even had an area of less than 25 km^{2} (10 sq mi).

After 15 August 1947, most of the princely states soon acceded to India or Pakistan, or were annexed, as in the case of Hyderabad; but for some years many continued to exist within the new nations, until suppressed. There were several princely states in modern Pakistan, though they had relatively small sizes, except for Bahawalpur, which was large but thinly populated. The territory of modern Bangladesh had no princely states.

== History ==
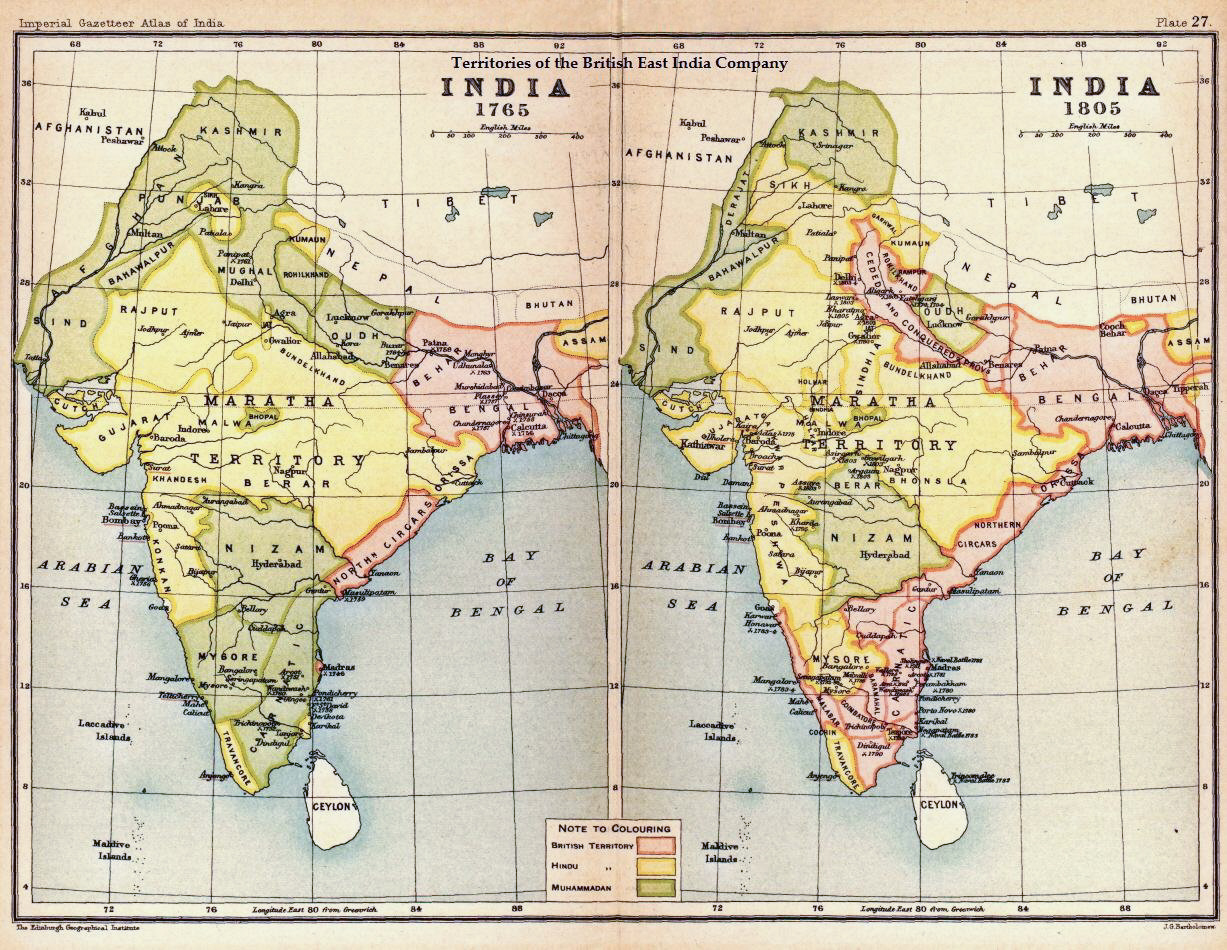
1765–1805 map of India, shown with a territorial division between Hindus, Muslims and the British

The princely states were the traditional monarchical states of India who had formed, under various degrees of pressure, subsidiary alliances with the East India Company. These relationships were taken over by the British Raj after 1858. Some dynasties, especially of Rajput princes, were very long-established, but others dated back to the turbulent period of the disintegration of the Mughal Empire in the 18th century, including the numerous Maratha states. Some princely states, mainly with Muslim ruling families, had a foreign origin due to the long period of external migration to India. Some of these were the rulers of Hyderabad (Turco-Persians), Bhopal (Afghans) and Janjira. Among the Hindu kingdoms, most of the rulers were Kshatriya. Only the Rajput states, Manipur, and a scattering of South Indian kingdoms could trace their lineage to the pre-Mughal period. Many dynasties conquered by the Maratha confederacy, Sikh Empire and others involved in the Mughal collapse remained without territories.

Where the EIC had generally regarded the princes unfavourably, as politically untrustworthy, wastefully extravagant, resistant to the development of India, and poor rulers of their peoples, the top level of the new British Raj came to see them more favourably, as a force for stability in Indian society, and one capable of being encouraged to exert themselves to improve the economy and social conditions of their peoples. The general refusal of the princes to join the rebels in the Indian Mutiny had not gone unnoticed. Schools such as Mayo College and Aitchison College (in Lahore), modelled on the English public schools, were set up to educate boys from princely families. Among others, the successive holders of the titles of Maharaja of Mysore and Maharaja of Jaipur were regarded as model rulers.

The rulers of some of the princely states had a last moment of real power during the Partition of India as the Indian Independence Act 1947 (passed in Britain) allowed their rulers to choose whether to join India or Pakistan.

== British relationship with the princely states ==
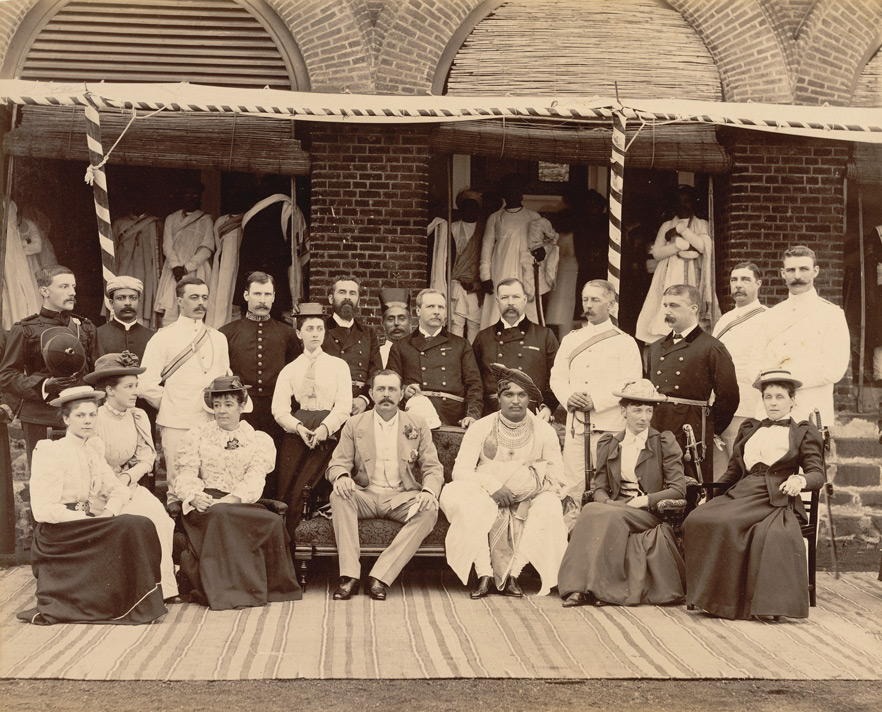
The 19-year-old Shahaji II Bhonsle Maharajah of Kolhapur visiting the British resident and his staff at the Residency, 1894

India under the British Raj (the "Indian Empire") consisted of two types of territory: British India and the native states or princely states. In its Interpretation Act 1889, the British Parliament adopted the following definitions:

(4.) The expression "British India" shall mean all territories and places within Her Majesty's dominions which are for the time being governed by Her Majesty through the Governor-General of India or through any governor or other officer subordinate to the Governor-General of India.
(5.) The expression "India" shall mean British India together with any territories of any native prince or chief under the suzerainty of Her Majesty exercised through the Governor-General of India, or through any governor or other officer subordinate to the Governor-General of India.

In general the term "British India" had been used (and is still used) also to refer to the regions under the rule of the East India Company in India from 1774 to 1858.

The British Crown's suzerainty over 175 princely states, generally the largest and most important, was exercised in the name of the Crown by the central government of British India under the Viceroy; the remaining approximately 400 states were influenced by Agents answerable to the provincial governments of British India under a governor, lieutenant-governor, or chief commissioner. A clear distinction between "dominion" and "suzerainty" was supplied by the jurisdiction of the courts of law: the law of British India rested upon the legislation enacted by the British Parliament, and the legislative powers those laws vested in the various governments of British India, both central and local; in contrast, the courts of the princely states existed under the authority of the respective rulers of those states.

Not all the princely states were in modern India or Pakistan. The standard list of Princely States, the Alqabnamah, began alphabetically with Abu Dhabi. The list also features Bhutan, Bahrain, and Ajman as "Protectorates" of the Viceroy, and features Nepal as an "independent state", with the Aga Khan also appearing as a prince without any land.

== Princely status and titles ==
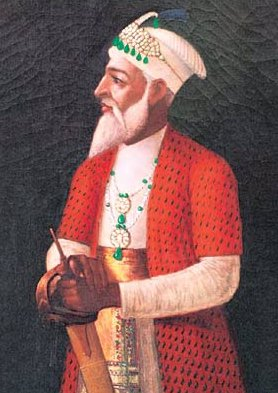
Portrait of the First Nizam of Hyderabad

The Indian rulers bore various titles including Maharaja or Raja ("king"), Emir, Raje, Nizam, Wadiyar (used only by the Maharajas of Mysore, meaning "lord"), Agniraj Maharaj for the rulers of Bhaddaiyan Raj, Chogyal, Nawab ("governor"), Nayak, Wāli, Inamdar, Saranjamdar and many others. Whatever the literal meaning and traditional prestige of the ruler's actual title, the British government translated them all as "prince", to avoid the implication that the native rulers could be "kings" with status equal to that of the British monarch.

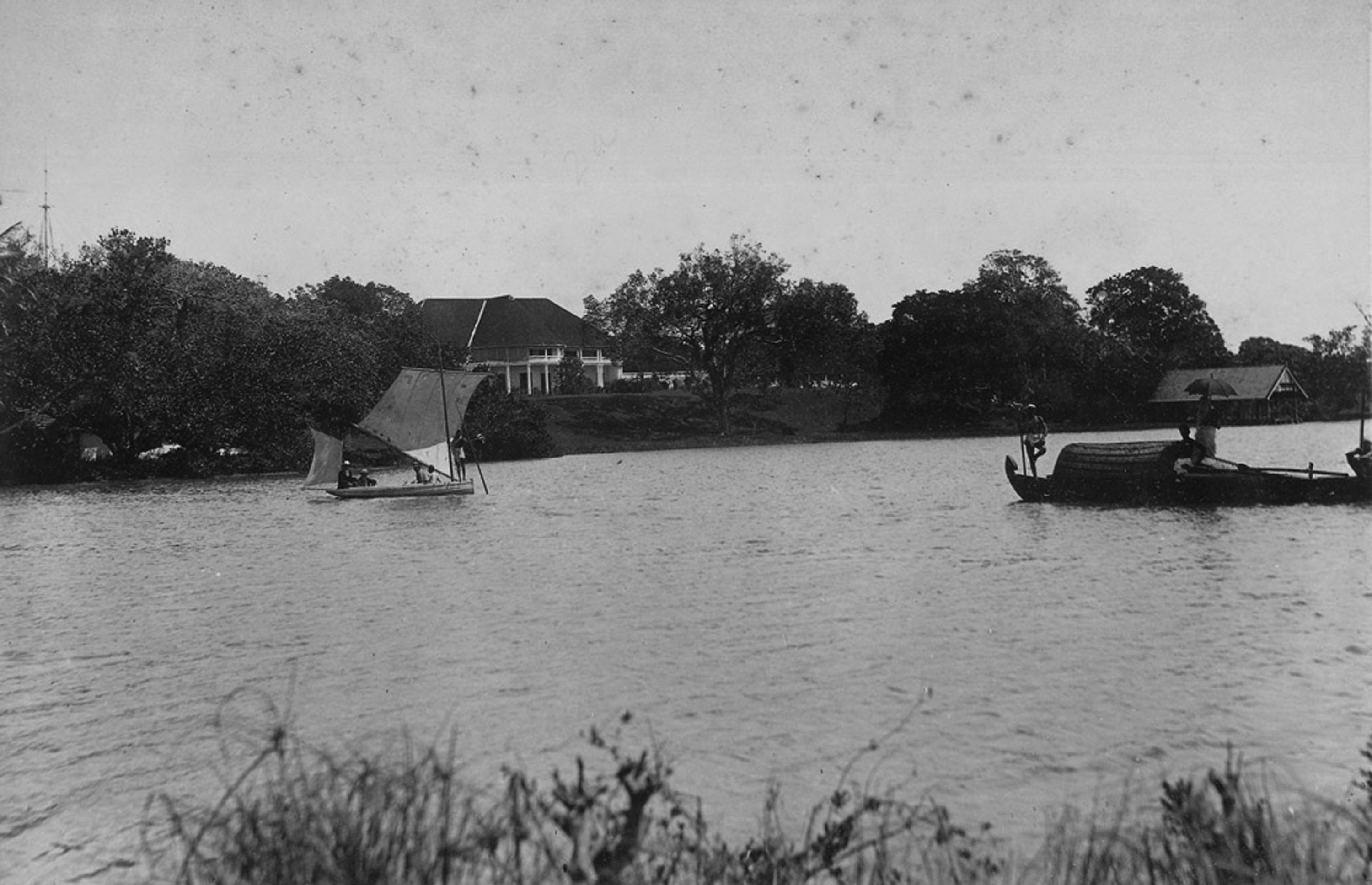
The British Residency in the city of Quilon, Kerala

More prestigious Hindu rulers (mostly existing before the Mughal Empire, or having split from such old states) often used the title "Raja", or a variant such as Raje, Rai, Rana, Babu, Rao, Rawat, or Rawal. Also in this 'class' were several Thakurs or Tagore and a few particular titles, such as Sardar, Mankari, Deshmukh, Sar Desai, Istamuradar, Saranjamdar, Raja Inamdar, etc. The most prestigious Hindu rulers usually had the prefix "maha-" ("great", compare for example "grand duke") in their titles, as in Maharaja, Maharana, Maharao, etc. This was used in many princely states including Nagpur, Kolhapur, Gwalior, Baroda, Mewar, Travancore and Cochin. The state of Travancore also had queens regent styled Maharani, applied only to the sister of the ruler in Kerala.

Muslim rulers almost all used the title "Nawab" (the Arabic honorific of naib, "deputy") originally used by Mughal governors, who became de facto autonomous with the decline of the Mughal Empire, with the prominent exceptions of the Nizam of Hyderabad & Berar, the Wali/Khan of Kalat and the Wāli of Swat.

Other less usual titles included Darbar Sahib, Dewan, Jam, Mehtar (unique to Chitral) and Mir (from Emir).

The Sikh princes concentrated in Punjab usually adopted titles when attaining princely rank. A title at a level of Maharaja was used.

There were also compound titles, such as (Maha)rajadhiraj, Raj-i-rajgan, often relics from an elaborate system of hierarchical titles under the Mughal emperors. For example, the addition of the adjective Bahadur (from Persian, literally meaning "brave") raised the status of the titleholder one level.

Furthermore, most dynasties used a variety of additional titles such as Varma in South India. This should not be confused with various titles and suffixes not specific to princes but used by entire (sub)castes. This is almost analogous to Singh title in North India.

== Precedence and prestige ==
The actual importance of a princely state could not be read from the title of its ruler, which was usually granted (or at least recognized) as a favour, often in recognition for loyalty and services rendered to the British Raj. Although some titles were raised once or even repeatedly, there was no automatic updating when a state gained or lost real power. Princely titles were even awarded to holders of domains (mainly jagirs) and even taluqdars and zamindars, which were not states at all. Most of the zamindars who held princely titles were in fact erstwhile princely and royal states reduced to becoming zamindars by the British East India Company. Various sources give significantly different numbers of states and domains of the various types. Even in general, the definitions of titles and domains are clearly not well-established.

The Nawab of Junagadh Bahadur Khan III (seated centre in an ornate chair) shown in an 1885 photograph with state officials and family

Photograph (1900) of the Maharani of Sikkim. Sikkim was under the suzerainty of the Provincial government of Bengal; its ruler received a 15-gun salute.

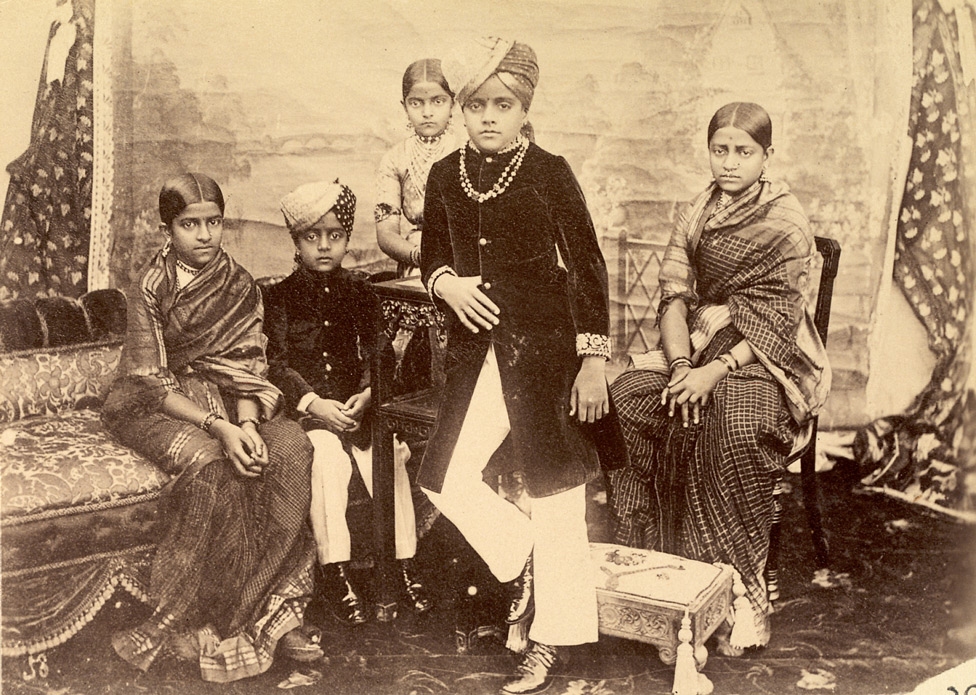
An 1895 group photograph of the eleven-year-old Krishnaraja Wadiyar IV, ruler of the princely state of Mysore in South India, with his brothers and sisters. In 1799, his grandfather, then aged five, had been granted dominion of Mysore by Britain after the Fourth Anglo-Mysore War and forced into a subsidiary alliance. Britain later directly governed the state between 1831 and 1881.

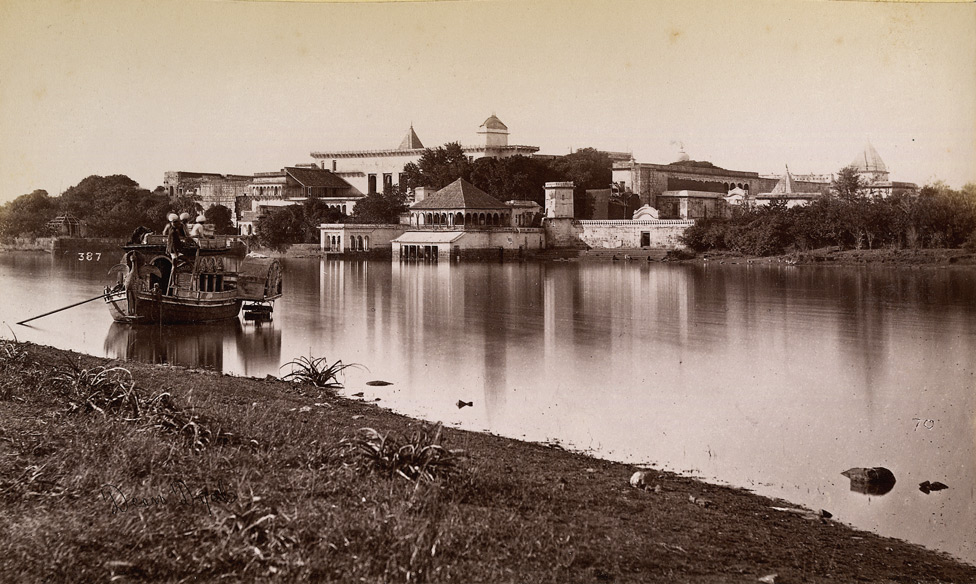
The Govindgarh Palace of the Maharaja of Rewa. The palace which was built as a hunting lodge later became famous for the first white tigers that were found in the adjacent jungle and raised in the palace zoo.

In addition to their titles, all princely rulers were eligible to be appointed to certain British orders of chivalry associated with India, the Most Exalted Order of the Star of India and the Most Eminent Order of the Indian Empire. Women could be appointed as "Knights" (instead of Dames) of these orders. Rulers entitled to 21-gun and 19-gun salutes were normally appointed to the highest rank, Knight Grand Commander of the Order of the Star of India.

Many Indian princes served in the British Army, the Indian Army, or in local guard or police forces, often rising to high ranks; some even served while on the throne. Many of these were appointed as an aide-de-camp, either to the ruling prince of their own house (in the case of relatives of such rulers) or to British monarchs. Many saw active service, both on the subcontinent and on other fronts, during both World Wars.

Apart from those members of the princely houses who entered military service and who distinguished themselves, a good number of princes received honorary ranks as officers in the British and British Indian Armed Forces. Those ranks were conferred based on several factors, including their heritage, lineage, gun-salute (or lack of one) as well as personal character or martial traditions. After the First and Second World Wars, the princely rulers of several of the major states, including Gwalior, Patiala, Nabha, Faridkort, Bikaner, Jaipur, Jodhpur, Jammu and Kashmir and Hyderabad, were given honorary general officer ranks as a result of their states' contributions to the war effort.

- Lieutenant/Captain/Flight Lieutenant or Lieutenant-Commander/Major/Squadron Leader (for junior members of princely houses or for minor princes)
- Commander/Lieutenant-Colonel/Wing Commander or Captain/Colonel/Group Captain (granted to princes of salute states, often to those entitled to 15-guns or more)
- Commodore/Brigadier/Air Commodore (conferred upon princes of salute states entitled to gun salutes of 15-guns or more)
- Major-General/Air Vice-Marshal (conferred upon princes of salute states entitled to 15-guns or more; conferred upon rulers of the major princely states, including Baroda, Kapurthala, Travancore, Bhopal and Mysore)
- Lieutenant-General (conferred upon the rulers of the largest and most prominent princely houses after the First and Second World Wars for their states' contributions to the war effort.)
- General (very rarely awarded; the Maharajas of Gwalior and Jammu & Kashmir were created honorary Generals in the British Army in 1877, the Maharaja of Bikaner was made one in 1937, and the Nizam of Hyderabad in 1941)

It was also not unusual for members of princely houses to be appointed to various colonial offices, often far from their native state, or to enter the diplomatic corps.

=== Salute states ===
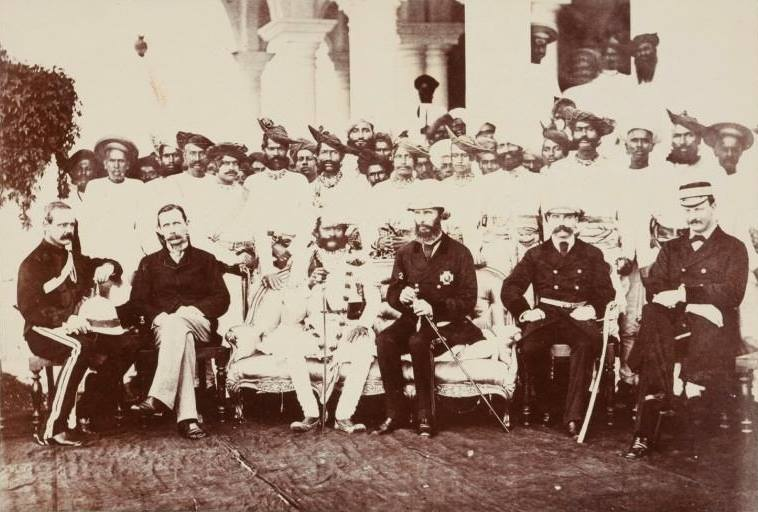
HH Maharaja Sir Jayaji Rao Scindia of Gwalior State, General Sir Henry Daly (Founder of The Daly College), with British officers and Maratha nobility (Sardars, Jagirdars & Mankaris) in Indore, Holkar State, c. 1879

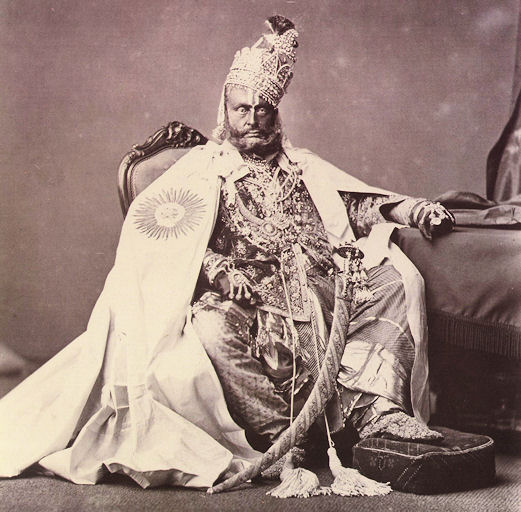
The Maharaja of Rewa, Raghuraj Singh Ju Deo Bahadur in 1877

The gun salute system was used to set unambiguously the precedence of the major rulers in the area in which the British East India Company was active, or generally of the states and their dynasties. As heads of state, certain princely rulers were entitled to be saluted by the firing of an odd number of guns between three and 21, with a greater number of guns indicating greater prestige. Generally, the number of guns remained the same for all successive rulers of a particular state, but individual princes were sometimes granted additional guns on a personal basis. Furthermore, rulers were sometimes granted additional gun salutes within their own territories only, constituting a semi-promotion. The states of all these rulers (about 120) were known as salute states.

After Indian Independence, the Maharana of Udaipur displaced the Nizam of Hyderabad as the most senior prince in India, because Hyderabad State had not acceded to the new Dominion of India, and the style Highness was extended to all rulers entitled to 9-gun salutes. When the princely states had been integrated into the Indian Union, their rulers were promised continued privileges and an income (known as the Privy Purse) for their upkeep. Subsequently, when the Indian government abolished the Privy Purse in 1971, the entire princely order ceased to be recognized under Indian law, although many families continue to retain their social prestige informally. Some descendants of the rulers remain prominent in regional or national politics, diplomacy, business, and high society.

At the time of Indian independence, only five rulers – the Nizam of Hyderabad, the Maharaja of Mysore, the Maharaja of Jammu and Kashmir state, the Maharaja Scindia of Gwalior and the Maharaja Gaekwad of Baroda – were entitled to a 21-gun salute. Six more – the Nawab of Bhopal, the Maharaja Holkar of Indore, the Maharaja of Bharatpur, the Maharana of Udaipur, the Maharaja of Kolhapur, the Maharaja of Patiala and the Maharaja of Travancore – were entitled to 19-gun salutes. The most senior princely ruler was the Nizam of Hyderabad, who was entitled to the unique style Exalted Highness and 21-gun salute. Other princely rulers entitled to salutes of 11 guns (soon 9 guns too) or more were entitled to the style Highness. No special style was used by rulers entitled to lesser gun salutes.

As paramount ruler, and successor to the Mughals, the British King-Emperor of India, for whom the style of Majesty was reserved, was entitled to an 'imperial' 101-gun salute—in the European tradition also the number of guns fired to announce the birth of an heir (male) to the throne.

=== Non-salute states ===
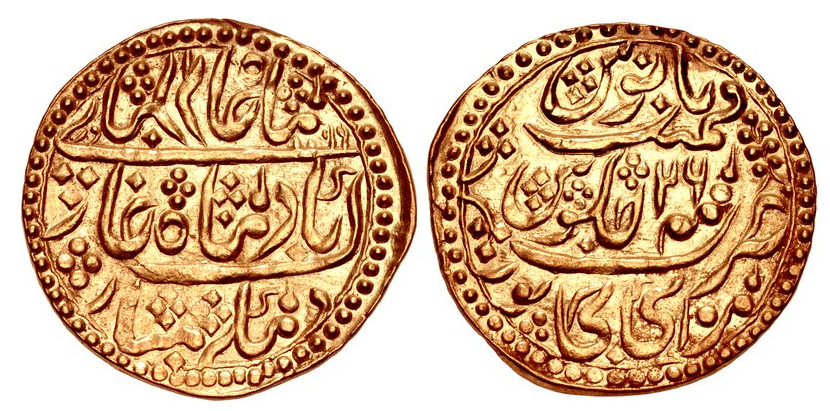
Coinage of king Manak Pal (1772–1804), Princely State of Karauli. Karauli mint. Struck in the name of the Mughal emperor Shah Alam II. Dated 1784–5 CE

There was no strict correlation between the levels of the titles and the classes of gun salutes, the real measure of precedence, but merely a growing percentage of higher titles in classes with more guns.

As a rule the majority of gun-salute princes had at least nine, with numbers below that usually the prerogative of Arab Sheikhs of the Aden protectorate, also under British protection.

There were many so-called non-salute states of lower prestige. Since the total of salute states was 117 and there were more than 500 princely states, most rulers were not entitled to any gun salute. Not all of these were minor rulers – Surguja State, for example, was both larger and more populous than Karauli State, but the Maharaja of Karauli was entitled to a 17-gun salute and the Maharaja of Surguja was not entitled to any gun salute at all.

A number of princes, in the broadest sense of the term, were not even acknowledged as such. On the other hand, the dynasties of certain defunct states were allowed to keep their princely status – they were known as political pensioners, such as the Nawab of Oudh. There were also certain estates of British India which were rendered as political saranjams, having equal princely status. Though none of these princes were awarded gun salutes, princely titles in this category were recognised as a form of vassals of salute states, and were not even in direct relation with the paramount power.

=== Largest princely states by area ===
Eleven largest princely states by area
Name of princely state	Area (mi^{2})	Population in 1941		Present State	Ruler			
Name of princely state	Area (mi^{2})	Population in 1941		Present State	Title	Ethnicity	Religion	Gun-salute
Jammu and Kashmir	84,471	4,021,616	Mostly Muslim; Hindu and Buddhist minorities (Includes Baltistan, Ladakh, and Poonch)	Jammu & Kashmir and Ladakh in India	Maharaja	Dogra	Hindu	21
Hyderabad State	82,698	16,338,534	Mostly Hindu; Muslim minority	Telangana, Maharashtra, Karnataka in India	Nizam	Turkic	Muslim	21
Khanate of Kalat	73,278	250,211	Mostly Muslim; small Hindu minority	Balochistan, Pakistan	Khan or Wali	Baloch	Muslim	19
Jodhpur State	36,071	2,125,000	Mostly Hindu; Muslim minority	Rajasthan, India	Maharaja	Rathore	Hindu	17
Kingdom of Mysore	29,458	7,328,896	Mostly Hindu; Muslim minority pockets	Karnataka, India	Wodeyar dynasty; Maharaja	Kannadiga	Hindu Kshatriya (Urs/Arasu in Kannada)	21
Gwalior State	26,397	4,006,159	Mostly Hindu; Muslim minority	Madhya Pradesh, India	Maharaja	Maratha	Hindu	21
Bikaner State	23,317	936,218	Mostly Hindu; small Muslim minority	Rajasthan, India	Maharaja	Rathore	Hindu	17
Bahawalpur State	17,726	1,341,209	Mostly Muslim; Hindu and Sikh minorities	Punjab, Pakistan	Nawab Amir	Daudpotra	Muslim	17
Jaisalmer State	16,100	76,255	Mostly Hindu; Muslim minority	Rajasthan, India	Maharaja	Bhati	Hindu	
Jaipur State	15,601	2,631,775	Mostly Hindu; Muslim minority	Rajasthan, India	Maharaja	Kachhwaha	Hindu	17
Bastar State	13,062	306,501	Mostly Hindu; small Muslim minority	Chhattisgarh, India	Maharaja; Kakatiya and Bhanja dynasties	Bhanja dynasty	Hindu	-

== Doctrine of lapse ==
A controversial aspect of East India Company rule was the doctrine of lapse, a policy under which lands whose feudal ruler died (or otherwise became unfit to rule) without a male biological heir (as opposed to an adopted son) would become directly controlled by the company and an adopted son would not become the ruler of the princely state. This policy went counter to Indian tradition where, unlike Europe, it was far more the accepted norm for a ruler to appoint his own heir.

The doctrine of lapse was pursued most vigorously by the Governor-General James Broun-Ramsay, 1st Marquess of Dalhousie. Dalhousie annexed seven states, including Awadh (Oudh), whose Nawabs he had accused of misrule, and the Maratha states of Nagpur, Jhansi, Satara, Sambalpur, and Thanjavur. Resentment over the annexation of these states turned to indignation when the heirlooms of the Maharajas of Nagpur were auctioned off in Calcutta. Dalhousie's actions contributed to the rising discontent amongst the upper castes which played a large part in the outbreak of the Indian mutiny of 1857. The last Mughal emperor, Bahadur Shah Zafar, whom many of the mutineers saw as a figurehead to rally around, was deposed following its suppression.

In response to the unpopularity of the doctrine, it was discontinued with the end of Company rule and the British Parliament's assumption of direct power over India in 1858.

== Imperial governance ==
By treaty, the British controlled the external affairs of the princely states absolutely. As the states were not British possessions, they retained control over their own internal affairs, subject to a degree of British influence which in many states was substantial.

By the beginning of the 20th century, relations between the British and the four largest states – Hyderabad, Mysore, Jammu and Kashmir, and Baroda – were directly under the control of the governor-general of India, in the person of a British resident. Two agencies, for Rajputana and Central India, oversaw twenty and 148 princely states respectively. The remaining princely states had their own British political officers, or Agents, who answered to the administrators of India's provinces. The agents of five princely states were then under the authority of Madras, 354 under Bombay, 26 of Bengal, two under Assam, 34 under Punjab, fifteen under the Central Provinces and Berar and two under the United Provinces.

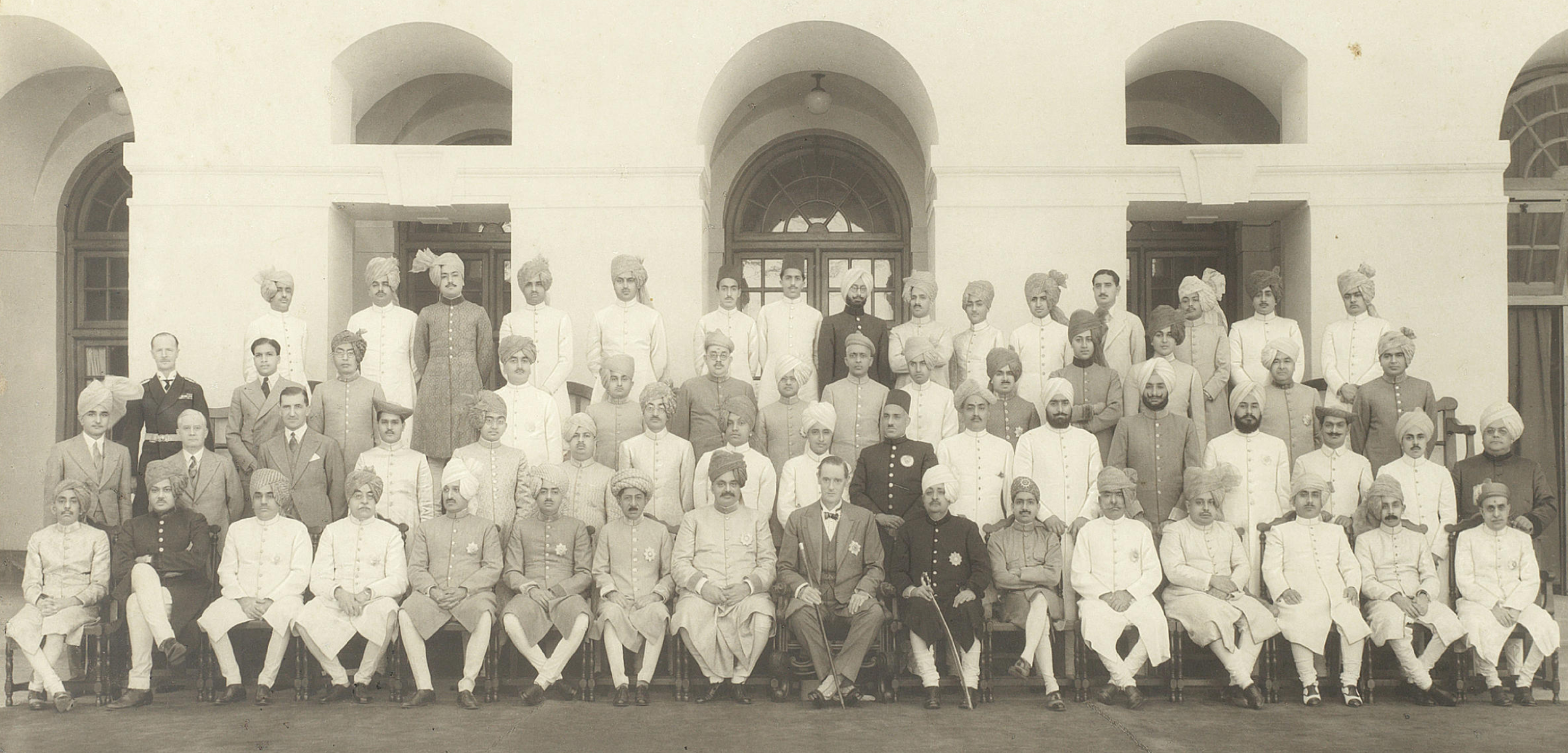
Chamber of Princes meeting in March 1941

The Chamber of Princes (Narender Mandal or Narendra Mandal) was an institution established in 1920 by a royal proclamation of the King-Emperor to provide a forum in which the rulers could voice their needs and aspirations to the government. It survived until the end of the British Raj in 1947.

By the early 1930s, most of the princely states whose agencies were under the authority of India's provinces were organised into new Agencies, answerable directly to the governor-general, on the model of the Central India and Rajputana agencies: the Eastern States Agency, Punjab States Agency, Baluchistan Agency, Deccan States Agency, Madras States Agency and the Northwest Frontier States Agency. The Baroda Residency was combined with the princely states of northern Bombay Presidency into the Baroda, Western India and Gujarat States Agency. Gwalior was separated from the Central India Agency and given its own Resident, and the states of Rampur and Benares, formerly with Agents under the authority of the United Provinces, were placed under the Gwalior Residency in 1936. The princely states of Sandur and Banganapalle in Mysore Presidency were transferred to the agency of the Mysore Resident in 1939.

Principal princely states in 1947

The native states in 1947 included five large states that were in "direct political relations" with the Government of India. For the complete list of princely states in 1947, see lists of princely states of India.

=== In direct relations with the central government ===
Five large princely states in direct political relations with the Central Government in India
Princely state	Area (sq. mi.)	Population (1941)	Approximate revenue (lakhs of rupees)	Ruler				Designation of local political officer
Princely state	Area (sq. mi.)	Population (1941)	Approximate revenue (lakhs of rupees)	Title	Ethnicity	Religion	Gun-salute	Designation of local political officer
Baroda State	13,866	3,343,477 (chiefly Hindu; Muslim minority)	323.26	Maharaja	Maratha	Hindu	21	Resident at Baroda
Hyderabad State	82,698	16,338,534 (mostly Hindu; Muslim minority)	1582.43	Nizam	Turkic	Muslim	21	Resident in Hyderabad
Jammu and Kashmir	84,471	4,021,616 including Baltistan, Ladakh, and Poonch (mostly Muslim; Hindu and Buddhist minorities)	463.95	Maharaja	Dogra	Hindu	21	Resident in Jammu & Kashmir
Kingdom of Mysore	29,458	7,328,896 (chiefly Hindu; Muslim minority)	1001.38	Wodeyar (means Owner in Kannada) and Maharaja	Kannadiga	Hindu	21	Resident in Mysore
Gwalior State	26,397	4,006,159 (chiefly Hindu; Muslim minority)	356.75	Maharaja	Maratha	Hindu	21	Resident at Gwalior
Total	236,890	35,038,682	3727.77					

Central India Agency, Gwalior Residency, Baluchistan Agency, Rajputana Agency, Eastern States Agency

88 princely states forming the Central India Agency
Princely state	Area (sq. mi.)	Population (1941)	Approximate revenue (lakhs of rupees)	Ruler				Designation of local political officer
Princely state	Area (sq. mi.)	Population (1941)	Approximate revenue (lakhs of rupees)	Title	Ethnicity	Religion	Gun-salute	Designation of local political officer
Indore State	9,341	1,513,966 (chiefly Hindu; Muslim minority)	304.9	Maharaja	Maratha	Hindu	19 (plus 2 local)	Resident at Indore
Bhopal	6,924	785,322 (chiefly Hindu; Muslim minority)	119.82	Nawab (m)/Begum (f)	Afghan	Muslim	19 (plus 2 local)	Political Agent in Bhopal
Rewah	13,000	1,820,445 (chiefly Hindu; Muslim minority)	65	Maharaja	Baghel Rajput	Hindu	17	Second largest state in Baghelkhand
85 smaller and minor states (1941)	22,995 (1901)	2.74 million (chiefly Hindu, 1901)	129 (1901)					
Total	77,395 (1901)	8.51 million (1901)	421 (1901)					

42 princely states forming the Eastern States Agency
Princely state	Area (sq. mi.)	Population (1941)	Approximate revenue (lakhs of rupees)	Ruler				Designation of local political officer
Princely state	Area (sq. mi.)	Population (1941)	Approximate revenue (lakhs of rupees)	Title	Ethnicity	Religion	Gun-salute	Designation of local political officer
Cooch Behar	1,318	639,898 (chiefly Hindu; Muslim minority)	91	Maharaja	Koch (Kshattriya)	Brahmo	13	Resident for the Eastern States
Tripura State	4,116	513,010 (chiefly Vaishnavite; Sanamahi minority)	54	Maharaja	Tripuri	Vaishnavite (Kshattriya)	13	Resident for the Eastern States
Mayurbhanj State	4,243	990,977 (chiefly Hindu)	49	Maharaja	Kshattriya	Hindu	9	Resident for the Eastern States
39 smaller and minor states (1941)	56,253	6,641,991	241.31					Resident for the Eastern States
Total	65,930	8,785,876	435.31					

Gwalior Residency (two states)

Two states under the suzerainty of the Resident at Gwalior, Gwalior having direct relations with the central government.
Princely state	Area (sq. mi.)	Population (1941)	Approximate revenue (lakhs of rupees)	Ruler				Designation of local political officer
Princely state	Area (sq. mi.)	Population (1941)	Approximate revenue (lakhs of rupees)	Title	Ethnicity	Religion	Gun-salute	Designation of local political officer
Rampur	893	464,919 (chiefly Muslim; Hindu minority in 1931)	51	Nawab	Jat	Muslim	15	Political Agent at Rampur
Benares State	875	391,165 (chiefly Hindu, 1931)	19	Maharaja	Bhumihar	Hindu	13 (plus 2 local)	Political Agent at Benares
Total	1,768	856,084 (1941, approx.)	70					

23 princely states forming the Rajputana Agency, with the Resident for Rajputana at Abu
Princely state	Area (sq. mi.)	Population (1941)	Approximate revenue (lakhs of rupees)	Ruler				Designation of local political officer
Princely state	Area (sq. mi.)	Population (1941)	Approximate revenue (lakhs of rupees)	Title	Ethnicity	Religion	Gun-salute	Designation of local political officer
Udaipur (Mewar)	13,170	1,926,698 (chiefly Hindu and Bhil)	107	Maharana	Sisodia Rajput	Hindu	19 (plus 2 personal)	Political Agent for the Mewar and Southern Rajputana States
Jaipur	15,610	3,040,876 (chiefly Hindu)	188.6	Maharaja	Kachwaha Rajput	Hindu	17 (plus 2 personal)	Political Agent at Jaipur
Jodhpur (Marwar)	36,120	2,555,904 (chiefly Hindu)	208.65	Maharaja	Rathor Rajput	Hindu	17	Political Agent for the Western States of Rajputana
Bikaner	23,181	1,292,938 (chiefly Hindu)	185.5	Maharaja	Rathor Rajput	Hindu	17	Political Agent for the Western States of Rajputana
17 salute states, 1 chiefship, 1 zamindari	42,374	3.64 million (chiefly Hindu, 1901)	155 (1901)					
Total	128,918 (1901)	9.84 million (1901)	320 (1901)					

Three princely states forming the Baluchistan Agency
Princely state	Area (sq. mi.)	Population (1941)	Approximate revenue (lakhs of rupees)	Ruler				Designation of local political officer
Princely state	Area (sq. mi.)	Population (1941)	Approximate revenue (lakhs of rupees)	Title	Ethnicity	Religion	Gun-salute	Designation of local political officer
Kalat	73,278	250,211 (chiefly Muslim)	21.3	Khan or Wali	Baloch	Muslim	19	Political Agent in Kalat
Las Bela	7,132	68,972 (chiefly Muslim)	6.1	Jam	Jamote	Muslim		Political Agent in Kalat
Kharan	14,210	33,763 (chiefly Muslim)	2	Nawab	Baloch	Muslim		Political Agent in Kalat
Total	94,620	352,946	29.4					

Other states under provincial governments

Madras (5 states)

5 states under the suzerainty of the Provincial Government of Madras
Princely state	Area (sq. mi.)	Population (1941)	Approximate revenue (lakhs of rupees)	Ruler				Designation of local political officer
Princely state	Area (sq. mi.)	Population (1941)	Approximate revenue (lakhs of rupees)	Title	Ethnicity	Religion	Gun-salute	Designation of local political officer
Travancore	7,091	2,952,157 (chiefly Hindu and Christian)	100	Maharaja	Malayali	Hindu	19 (plus 2 personal)	Resident in Travancore and Cochin
Cochin	1,362	812,025 (chiefly Hindu and Christian)	27	Maharaja	Malayali	Hindu	17	Resident in Travancore and Cochin
Pudukkottai	1,100	380,440 (chiefly Hindu)	11	Raja	Kallar	Hindu	11	Collector of Trichinopoly (ex officio Political Agent)
2 minor states (Banganapalle and Sandur)	416	43,464	3					
Total	9,969	4,188,086	141					

Bombay (354 states)

354 states under the suzerainty of the Provincial Government of Bombay
Princely state	Area (sq. mi.)	Population (1941)	Approximate revenue (lakhs of rupees)	Ruler				Designation of local political officer
Princely state	Area (sq. mi.)	Population (1941)	Approximate revenue (lakhs of rupees)	Title	Ethnicity	Religion	Gun-salute	Designation of local political officer
Kolhapur	2,855	910,011 (chiefly Hindu)	48	Maharaja	Chhtrapati Maratha	Hindu	19	Political Agent for Kolhapur
Cutch	7,616	488,022 (chiefly Hindu)	20	Maharao	Jadeja Rajput	Hindu	17	Political Agent in Cutch
Junagarh	3,284	395,428 (chiefly Hindu; Muslim minority)	27	Nawab	Pathan	Muslim	11	Agent to the Governor in Kathiawar
Navanagar	3,791	336,779 (chiefly Hindu)	31	Jam Sahib	Jadeja Rajput	Hindu	11	Agent to the Governor in Kathiawar
349 other states	42,165	4,579,095	281					
Total	65,761	6,908,648	420					

Central Provinces (15 states)

15 states under the suzerainty of the Provincial Government of the Central Provinces
Princely state	Area (sq. mi.)	Population (1941)	Approximate revenue (lakhs of rupees)	Ruler				Designation of local political officer
Princely state	Area (sq. mi.)	Population (1941)	Approximate revenue (lakhs of rupees)	Title	Ethnicity	Religion	Gun-salute	Designation of local political officer
Kalahandi	3,745	284,465 (chiefly Hindu)	4	Raja	Kshatriya	Hindu	9	Political Agent for the Chhattisgarh Feudatories
Bastar	13,062	306,501 (chiefly animist)	3	Raja	Kshatriya	Hindu		Political Agent for the Chhattisgarh Feudatories
13 other states	12,628	1,339,353 (chiefly Hindu)	16				11	
Total	29,435	1,996,383	21					

Punjab (45 states)

45 states under the suzerainty of the Provincial Government of the Punjab
Princely state	Area (sq. mi.)	Population (1941)	Approximate revenue (lakhs of rupees)	Ruler				Designation of local political officer
Princely state	Area (sq. mi.)	Population (1941)	Approximate revenue (lakhs of rupees)	Title	Ethnicity	Religion	Gun-salute	Designation of local political officer
Bahawalpur State	16,434	1,341,209 (chiefly Muslim)	335	Nawab	Daudputra	Muslim	17	Political Agent for Phulkian States and Bahawalpur
Patiala State	5,942	1,936,259 (chiefly Sikh)	302.6	Maharaja		Sikh	17 (and 2 personal)	Political Agent for Phulkian States and Bahawalpur
Nabha State	947	340,044 (chiefly Sikh)	38.7	Maharaja		Sikh	13 (and 2 local)	Political Agent for Phulkian States and Bahawalpur
Jind State	1,299	361,812 (chiefly Sikh)	37.4	Maharaja		Sikh	13 (and 2 personal)	Political Agent for Phulkian States and Bahawalpur
Kapurthala State	645	378,380 (chiefly Sikh)	40.5	Maharaja	Ahuluwalia	Sikh	13 (and 2 personal)	Commissioner of the Jullundur Division (ex officio Political Agent)
Faridkot State	638	199,283 (chiefly Sikh)	22.7	Raja		Sikh	11	Commissioner of the Jullundur Division (ex officio Political Agent)
Garhwal State	4,500	397,369 (chiefly Hindu)	26.9	Maharaja	Rajput	Hindu	11	Commissioner of Kumaun (ex officio Political Agent)
Khayrpur State	6,050	305,387 (chiefly Muslim)	37.8	Mir	Talpur Baloch	Muslim	15 (plus 2 local)	Political Agent for Khairpur
25 other states	12,661 (in 1901)	1,087,614 (in 1901)	30 (in 1901)					
Total	36,532 (in 1901)	4,424,398 (in 1901)	155 (in 1901)					

Assam (26 states)

26 states under the suzerainty of the Provincial Government of Assam
Princely state	Area (sq. mi.)	Population (1941)	Approximate revenue (lakhs of rupees)	Ruler				Designation of local political officer
Princely state	Area (sq. mi.)	Population (1941)	Approximate revenue (lakhs of rupees)	Title	Ethnicity	Religion	Gun-salute	Designation of local political officer
Manipur	270.3	512,069 (chiefly Hindu and animist)	19	Raja	Kshatriya	Hindu	11	Political Agent in Manipur
25 Khasi States	3,778	213,586 (chiefly Khasi and Christian)	~1 (1941, approx.)					Deputy Commissioner, Khasi and Jaintia Hills
Total	12,416	725,655	20 (1941; approx.)					

== British rule in Burma ==
Burma (52 states)

52 states in Burma: all except Kantarawadi, one of the Karenni States, were included in British India until 1937
Princely state	Area (sq. mi.)	Population (1941)	Approximate revenue (lakhs of rupees)	Ruler				Designation of local political officer
Princely state	Area (sq. mi.)	Population (1941)	Approximate revenue (lakhs of rupees)	Title	Ethnicity	Religion	Gun-salute	Designation of local political officer
Hsipaw (Thibaw)	5,086	105,000 (Buddhist)	3	Sawbwa	Shan	Buddhist	9	Superintendent, Northern Shan States
Kengtung	12,000	190,000 (Buddhist)	1	Sawbwa	Shan	Buddhist	9	Superintendent, Southern Shan States
Yawnghwe	865	95,339 (Buddhist)	2.13	Sawbwa	Shan	Buddhist	9	Superintendent, Southern Shan States
Möng Nai	2,717	44,000 (Buddhist)	0.5	Sawbwa	Shan	Buddhist		Superintendent, Southern Shan States
5 Karenni States	3,130	45,795 (Buddhist and animist)	0.035	Sawbwa	Karenni	Buddhist		Superintendent, Southern Shan States
44 other states	42,198	792,152 (Buddhist and animist)	8.5					
Total	67,011	1,177,987	13.5					

== State military forces ==
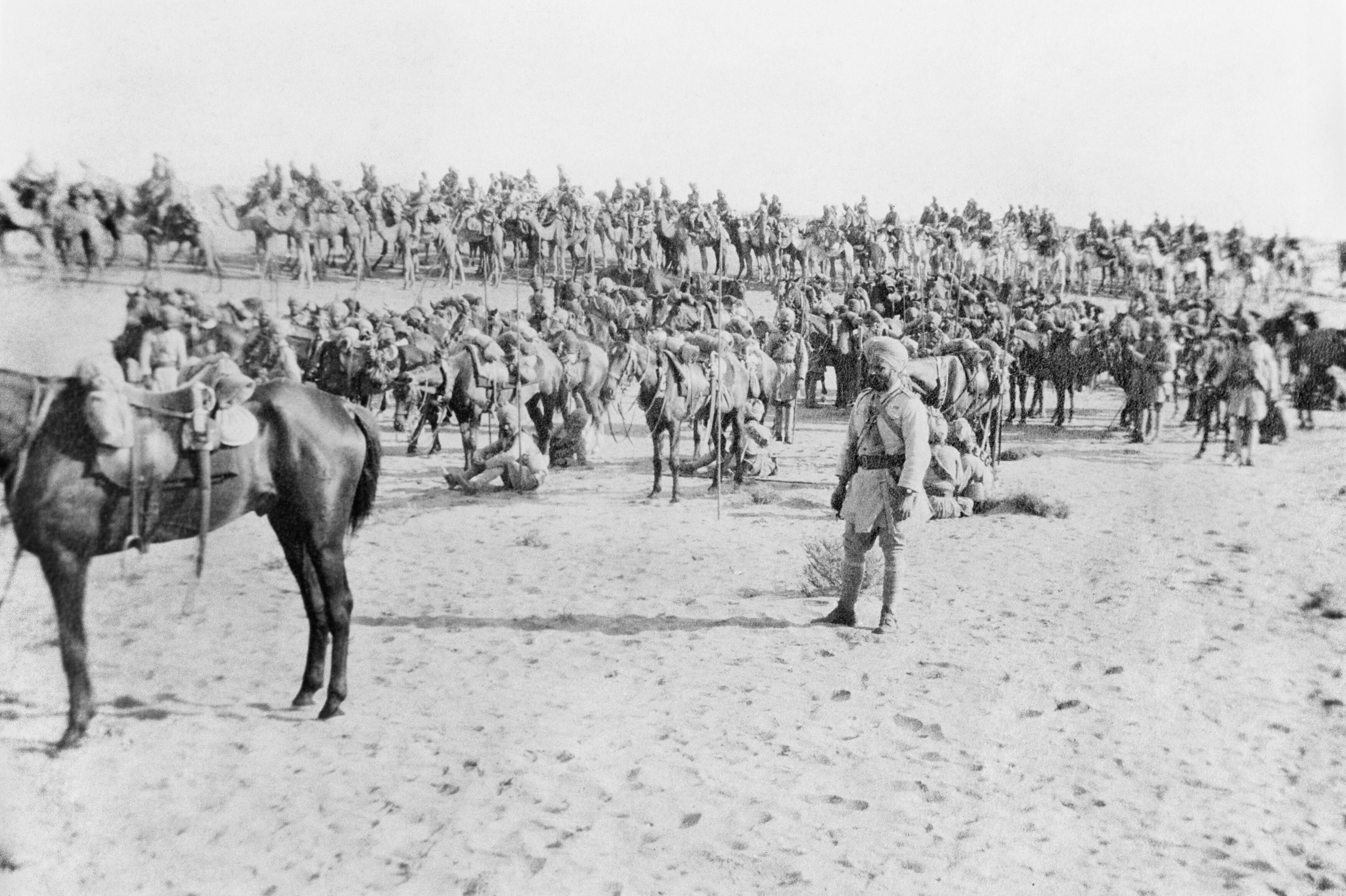
Mysore and Bengal Lancers with Bikaner Camel Corps in the Sinai Desert, Egypt, 1915.

The armies of the princely states were bound by many restrictions that were imposed by subsidiary alliances. They existed mainly for ceremonial use and for internal policing, although certain units designated as Imperial Service Troops, were available for service alongside the regular British Indian Army upon request by the British government.

According to the Imperial Gazetteer of India vol. IV 1907, p. 85,

Since a chief can neither attack his neighbour nor fall out with a foreign nation, it follows that he needs no military establishment which is not required either for police purposes or personal display, or for cooperation with the Imperial Government. The treaty made with Gwalior in 1844, and the instrument of transfer given to Mysore in 1881, alike base the restriction of the forces of the State upon the broad ground of protection. The former explained in detail that unnecessary armies were embarrassing to the State itself and the cause of disquietude to others: a few months later a striking proof of this was afforded by the army of the Sikh Kingdom of Lahore. The British Government has undertaken to protect the dominions of the Native princes from invasion and even from rebellion within: its army is organised for the defence not merely of British India, but of all the possessions under the suzerainty of the King-Emperor.

In addition, other restrictions were imposed:

The treaties with most of the larger States are clear on this point. Posts in the interior must not be fortified, factories for the production of guns and ammunition must not be constructed, nor may the subject of other States be enlisted in the local forces. ... They must allow the forces that defend them to obtain local supplies, to occupy cantonments or positions, and to arrest deserters; and in addition to these services they must recognise the Imperial control of the railways, telegraphs, and postal communications as essential not only to the common welfare but to the common defence.

The Imperial Service Troops were routinely inspected by British army officers and had the same equipment as soldiers in the British Indian Army. Although their numbers were relatively small, the Imperial Service Troops were employed in China and British Somaliland in the first decade of the 20th century, and later saw action in the First World War and Second World War.

== Political integration of princely states ==
In 1920, the Indian National Congress under the leadership of Mahatma Gandhi declared that attainment of swaraj for Indians was its goal. It asked "all the sovereign princes of India to establish full responsible government in their states". Gandhi assured the princes that the Congress would not intervene in the princely states internal affairs . Congress reiterated their demand at the 1928 Calcutta party congress, "This Congress assures the people of the Indian States of its sympathy with and support in their legitimate and peaceful struggle for the attainment of full responsible government in the States."

Jawaharlal Nehru played a major role in pushing Congress to confront the princely states. In his presidential address at Lahore session in 1929, Nehru declared: "The Indian states cannot live apart from the rest of the (sic) India". Nehru added he was "no believer in kings or princes" and that "the only people who have the right to determine the future of the States must be the people of these States. This Congress which claims self-determination cannot deny it to the people of the states."

After the Congress's electoral victory in the 1937 elections, protests, sometimes violent, and satyagrahas against the princely states were organised and were supported by the Congress's ministries. Gandhi fasted in Rajkot State to demand "full responsible government" and added that "the people" were "the real rulers of Rajkot under the paramountcy of the Congress". Gandhi termed this protest as struggle against "the disciplined hordes of the British empire". Gandhi proclaimed that the Congress had now every right to intervene in "the states which are the vassals of the British". In 1937, Gandhi played a major role in formation of federation involving a union between British India and the princely states with an Indian central government.

In 1939, Nehru challenged the existence of the princely states and added that "the states in modern India are anachronistic and do not deserve to exist." In July 1946, Nehru pointedly observed that no princely state could prevail militarily against the army of independent India.

Hindu Mahasabha took funding from the princely states and supported them to remain independent even after the independence of India. Vinayak Damodar Savarkar particularly hailed the Hindu dominated states as the 'bedrock of Hindu power' and defended their despotic powers, referring to them as the 'citadels of organised Hindu power'. He particularly hailed the princely states such as Mysore State, Travancore and Baroda State as 'progressive Hindu states'.

The era of the princely states effectively ended with Indian independence in 1947; by 1950, almost all of the principalities had acceded to either the Dominion of India or the Dominion of Pakistan. The accession process was largely peaceful, except in the cases of Jammu and Kashmir (whose ruler decided to accede to India following an invasion by Pakistan-based forces, resulting in a long-standing dispute between the two countries), and Hyderabad State (whose ruler opted for independence in 1947, followed a year later by the invasion and annexation of the state by India), Junagarh and its vassal Bantva Manavadar (whose rulers acceded to Pakistan, but were annexed by India), and Kalat (whose ruler declared independence in 1947, followed in 1948 by the state's accession to Pakistan).

=== India ===
At the time of Indian independence on 15 August 1947, India was divided into two sets of territories, the first being the territories of "British India", which were under the direct control of the India Office in London and the governor-general of India, and the second being the "princely states", the territories over which the Crown had suzerainty, but which were under the control of their hereditary rulers. The integration of these territories into Dominion of India, that had been created by the Indian Independence Act 1947 by the British Parliament, was a declared objective of the Indian National Congress, which the Government of India pursued over the years 1947 to 1949. Through a combination of tactics, Sardar Vallabhbhai Patel and V. P. Menon in the months immediately preceding and following the independence convinced the rulers of almost all of the hundreds of princely states to accede to India. In a speech in January 1948, Vallabhbhai Patel said:

As you are all aware, on the lapse of Paramountcy every Indian State became a separate independent entity and our first task of consolidating about 550 States was on the basis of accession to the Indian Dominion on three subjects. Barring Hyderabad and Junagadh all the states which are contiguous to India acceded to Indian Dominion. Subsequently, Kashmir also came in... Some Rulers who were quick to read the writing on the wall, gave responsible government to their people; Cochin being the most illustrious example. In Travancore, there was a short struggle, but there, too, the Ruler soon recognised the aspiration of his people and agreed to introduce a constitution in which all powers would be transferred to the people and he would function as a constitutional Ruler.

Although this process successfully integrated the vast majority of princely states into India, it was not as successful in relation to a few states, notably the former princely state of Kashmir, whose Maharaja delayed signing the instrument of accession into India until his territories were under the threat of invasion by Pakistan, and the state of Hyderabad, whose ruler decided to remain independent and was subsequently defeated by the Operation Polo invasion.

Having secured their accession, Sardar Patel and V. P. Menon then proceeded, in a step-by-step process, to secure and extend the central government's authority over these states and to transform their administrations until, by 1956, there was little difference between the territories that had formerly been part of British India and those that had been princely states.

As per the terms of accession, the erstwhile Indian princes received privy purses (government allowances), and initially retained their statuses, privileges, and autonomy in internal matters during a transitional period which lasted until 1956. During this time, the former princely states were merged into unions, each of which was headed by a former ruling prince with the title of Rajpramukh (ruling chief), equivalent to a state governor. In 1956, the position of Rajpramukh was abolished and the federations dissolved, the former principalities becoming part of Indian states. The states which acceded to Pakistan retained their status until the promulgation of a new constitution in 1956, when most became part of the province of West Pakistan; a few of the former states retained their autonomy until 1969 when they were fully integrated into Pakistan. As the final step, in 1971, the 26th amendment to the Constitution of India withdrew recognition of the princes as rulers, took away their remaining privileges, and abolished the remuneration granted to them by privy purses.

In July 1946, Jawaharlal Nehru pointedly observed that no princely state could prevail militarily against the army of independent India. In January 1947, Nehru said that independent India would not accept the divine right of kings. In May, 1947, he declared that any princely state which refused to join the Constituent Assembly would be treated as an enemy state. There were officially 565 princely states when India and Pakistan became independent in 1947, but the great majority had contracted with the British viceroy to provide public services and tax collection. Only 21 had actual state governments, and only four were large (Hyderabad State, Mysore State, Jammu and Kashmir State, and Baroda State). They acceded to one of the two new independent countries between 1947 and 1949. All the princes were eventually pensioned off.

=== Pakistan ===
During the period of the British Raj, there were four princely states in Balochistan: Makran, Kharan, Las Bela and Kalat. The first three acceded to Pakistan. However, the ruler of the fourth princely state, the Khan of Kalat Ahmad Yar Khan, declared Kalat's independence as this was one of the options given to all princely states. The state remained independent until it was acceded on 27 March 1948. The signing of the Instrument of Accession by Ahmad Yar Khan, led his brother, Prince Abdul Karim, to revolt against his brother's decision in July 1948, causing an ongoing and still unresolved insurgency.

Bahawalpur from the Punjab Agency joined Pakistan on 5 October 1947. The princely states of the North-West Frontier States Agency included the Dir Swat and Chitral Agency and the Deputy Commissioner of Hazara acting as the Political Agent for Amb and Phulra. These states joined Pakistan on independence from the British.

== See also ==
- Flags of Indian princely states
- Political integration of India
- List of princely states of British India (by region)
- List of Indian monarchs
- Praja Mandal
- Salute state
- Indian feudalism
- Indian honorifics
- Ghatwals and Mulraiyats
- Jagirdar
- List of Maratha dynasties and states
- List of Rajput dynasties and states
- Maratha Empire
- Middle kingdoms of India
- List of Jat dynasties and states
- Oudh Bequest
- Rajputana
- Zamindar

== Bibliography ==
- Bangash, Yaqoob Khan (2016). "A Princely Affair: The Accession and Integration of the Princely States of Pakistan, 1947–1955". Oxford University Press Pakistan. ISBN 978-0-19-940736-1
- Bhagavan, Manu. "Princely States and the Hindu Imaginary: Exploring the Cartography of Hindu Nationalism in Colonial India" Journal of Asian Studies, (Aug 2008) 67#3 pp 881–915 in JSTOR
- Bhagavan, Manu. Sovereign Spheres: Princes, Education and Empire in Colonial India (2003)
- Copland, Ian (2002), Princes of India in the Endgame of Empire, 1917–1947, (Cambridge Studies in Indian History & Society). Cambridge and London: Cambridge University Press. Pp. 316, ISBN 978-0-521-89436-4.
- Ernst, W. and B. Pati, eds. India's Princely States: People, Princes, and Colonialism (2007)
- Harrington, Jack (2010), Sir John Malcolm and the Creation of British India, Chs. 4 & 5., New York: Palgrave Macmillan., ISBN 978-0-230-10885-1
- Jeffrey, Robin. People, Princes and Paramount Power: Society and Politics in the Indian Princely States (1979) 396pp
- Kooiman, Dick. Communalism and Indian Princely States: Travancore, Baroda & Hyderabad in the 1930s (2002), 249pp
- Markovits, Claude (2004). "ch 21: "Princely India (1858–1950)". A history of modern India, 1480–1950. Anthem Press. pp. 386–409. ISBN 978-1-84331-152-2.
- Ramusack, Barbara (2004), The Indian Princes and their States, The New Cambridge History of India, Cambridge and London: Cambridge University Press., ISBN 978-0-521-03989-5
- Pochhammer, Wilhelm von India's Road to Nationhood: A Political History of the Subcontinent (1973) ch 57 excerpt
- Zutshi, Chitralekha (2009). "Re-visioning princely states in South Asian historiography: A review". Indian Economic & Social History Review. 46 (3): 301–313. doi:10.1177/001946460904600302. S2CID 145521826.

=== Gazetteers ===
- Imperial Gazetteer of India vol. II (1908), The Indian Empire, Historical, Published under the authority of His Majesty's Secretary of State for India in Council, Oxford at the Clarendon Press. Pp. xxxv, 1 map, 573. online
- Imperial Gazetteer of India vol. III (1907), The Indian Empire, Economic (Chapter X: Famine), pp. 475–502, Published under the authority of His Majesty's Secretary of State for India in Council, Oxford at the Clarendon Press. Pp. xxxvi, 1 map, 520. online
- Imperial Gazetteer of India vol. IV (1907), The Indian Empire, Administrative, Published under the authority of His Majesty's Secretary of State for India in Council, Oxford at the Clarendon Press. Pp. xxx, 1 map, 552. online
