= Shyam Shah Medical College =

Medical Institute in Rewa, India

Shyam Shah Medical College, Rewa
- Motto: मृत्योर्मा अमृतं गमय
- Motto in English: From death lead us to immortality
- Type: Government
- Established: 1963; 63 years ago
- Affiliations: Madhya Pradesh Medical Science University
- Dean: Dr. Sunil Agrawal
- Location: Rewa, Madhya Pradesh, India; 24.531715°N 81.299699°E
- Website: ssmcrewa.com

Shyam Shah Medical College is a public medical college in Rewa, Madhya Pradesh, India. The college is associated with Sanjay Gandhi Memorial Hospital and Gandhi Memorial Hospital. It is named after Thakur Shyam Shah Baghel, a prominent rebel leader of the Sepoy Mutiny in 1857 revolt.

According to David E.U. Baker in his book "Baghelkhand, or the Tigers’ Lair", Thakur Shyam Shah Baghel led a 300-strong resistance force in the Rewa–Shahdol–Katni region, utilizing guerrilla tactics to disrupt British supply lines during the 1857 Revolt and defeated the British authorities in multiple battles across Baghelkhand. Thakur Shyam Shah Baghel and his companions fought bravely against the British during the revolt of 1857. Thakur Shyam Shah and his rebel forces accompanied by Jagirdar of Sohagpur Thakur Garud Singh & his brother Thakur Bharat Singh defeated the British forces in the battle of Sohagpur and Shyam Shah killed the British commander, Captain Willington in that battle. Later, they again badly defeated the British forces led by Colonel Robertson in the battle of Jujhar Ghat, Damoh.

Thakur Shyam Shah Baghel was the uncle of Thakur Ranmat Singh Baghel and were both Baghel Rajput Sardars (commanders) in the army of Maharaja Raghuraj Singh of Rewa of Rewa (princely state) and both belong to wealthy Jagirdar family, later were both prominent leaders of the 1857 revolt in Baghelkhand, and they both were descendants of the Kothi royal family of Kothi State, Satna.

== Location ==
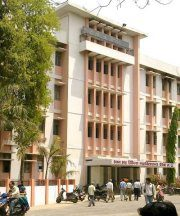
Front view of the medical college building

The college is situated in the heart of Rewa city near Sanjay Gandhi Memorial Hospital, which is the biggest hospital of Vindhya region.

== Establishment ==
The college was established in the year 1963 and initially started functioning in the Model Science College, Rewa till the college's own building was inaugurated by Shri Arjun Singh, the then Chief Minister of Madhya Pradesh state on 3 October 1980.

== Academics ==
The college has an annual intake of 100 undergraduate candidates for MBBS (25 seats added in 2019) and 50 postgraduate candidates for MD/MS/Diplomas. The college offers following courses recognised by Medical Council of India:

- MBBS
- MS/MD/Diploma courses in various subjects
- B.Sc. Nursing
- Paramedical courses

== Departments ==
- Anatomy
- Physiology
- Biochemistry
- Pharmacology
- Pathology
- Microbiology
- Forensic Medicine
- Community Medicine
- Ophthalmology
- Otolaryngology
- Medicine
- Surgery
- Obstetrics & Gynecology
- Pediatrics
- Anesthesiology
- Radiology
- Dermatology
- Orthopedics
- Psychiatry

== Campus ==
The campus is spread over a large area consisting of college building, medical auditorium, two huge hospitals i.e. Sanjay Gandhi memorial hospital and Gandhi memorial hospital, PG hostels, nurses hostel and doctor's residential colony. The UG hostel for boys and girls are situated near the PTS square of Rewa City. The college campus also has a badminton court, games hall and ground for various sports and recreational activities. Recently, the foundation of sculpture of Lal Shyam Shah(a freedom fighter from Vindhya region, in whose memory the college has been named) was laid in the college campus. A solar energy project has also been approved by State Ministry of New And Renewable Energy.
