= Raghuraj Singh of Rewa =

Maharaja of Rewah from 1854 to 1880

HH Maharaja Raghuraj Singh
- Maharaja of Rewa
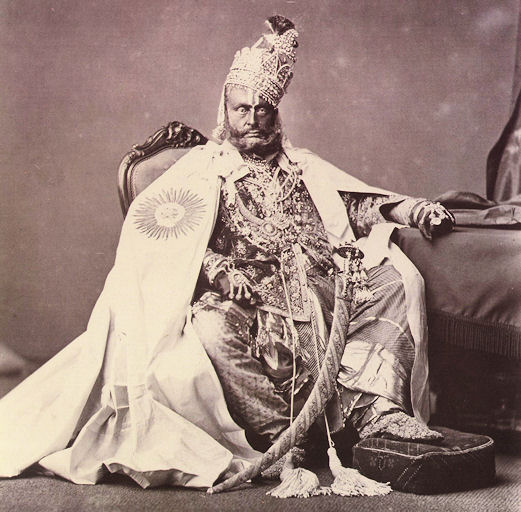
- Photograph of Maharaja Raghuraj Singh of Rewa, by Bourne & Shepherds, ca.1876

Maharaja of Rewa
- Reign: 12 October 1854 – 5 February 1880
- Predecessor: Maharaja Vishwanath Singh
- Successor: Sir Venkat Raman Ramanuj Prasad Singh Ju Deo
- Born: 1831; Rewa Fort, Rewa
- Died: 5 February 1880 (aged 48–49)
- Dynasty: Baghel dynasty
- Father: Maharaja Vishwanath Singh
- Religion: Hindu

HH Samrajya Maharajadhiraja Bandhresh Shri Maharaja Raghuraj Singh Ju Deo Bahadur (1831 – 5 Feb 1878) was the ruling Maharaja of the princely state of Rewa in the British Empire of India from 1854 until his death in 1878.

== Biography ==
Maharaja Raghuraj Singh succeeded his father, Maharaja Vishwanath Singh as the ruler of the Rewa State on 12 October 1854. His coronation was attended by British Lieutenant General Hamilton. Raghuraj Singh was proficient in Sanskrit, Persian, and English, and was interested in various forms of recreation, including chess.

Like his father, he was religious and authored several works of devotional literature, including Ram Rasikavali and Sri Ram Swayambar, which continue to be recited by Hindu priests in Vrindavan during satsangs. He was also recognised by the Mithilacharyas of Ayodhya for his literary contributions. During a visit to Jagannath Puri, he composed Jagdeesh Shatak. Under his reign, Laxmanbagh was designated as the Rajguru Ashram, and a temple dedicated to Lakshmana was established under the guidance of Swami Mukundacharya. Anyone entering his court was required to wear the Vaishnava Urdhva Pundra tilak, as evident in contemporary photographs.

During the Indian Rebellion of 1857, Raghuraj Singh assisted the British Raj in suppressing uprisings in the neighbouring regions of Mandla, Jabalpur, and Nagod (now part of Satna district). In recognition of this support, the British restored the parganas of Sohagpur (Shahdol) (present-day Shahdol district) and Amarkantak to Rewa, territories that had been seized by the [Maratha Empire] earlier in the century. Some historical accounts suggest that, while publicly cooperating with the British, he also privately supported elements of the independence movement. Figures such as Thakur Ranmat Singh and Lal Shyamshah, associated with this cause, are recorded to have resisted British authority.

In 1862, a British government agency was established in Rewa but was soon dissolved at the request of the Maharaja. In 1864, he was conferred the title of Knight Commander of the Order of the Star of India (KCSI), and was later elevated to Knight Grand Commander of the Order of the Star of India (GCSI). In 1870, the British established the Baghelkhand Agency to manage administrative affairs in the region.

In 1878, during his rule, the Adhrajiya Singh Tiwaris lost patronage of the state following an incident in which Dalganjan Singh Tiwari led an attack on Maulvi Rehman Ali, the Magistrate of Rewa Kutchery. As a consequence, Dalganjan's jagir was abolished, and his family subsequently moved to the Maihar State, where they obtained the taxing rights over the defaulted estate of Bhadanpur.

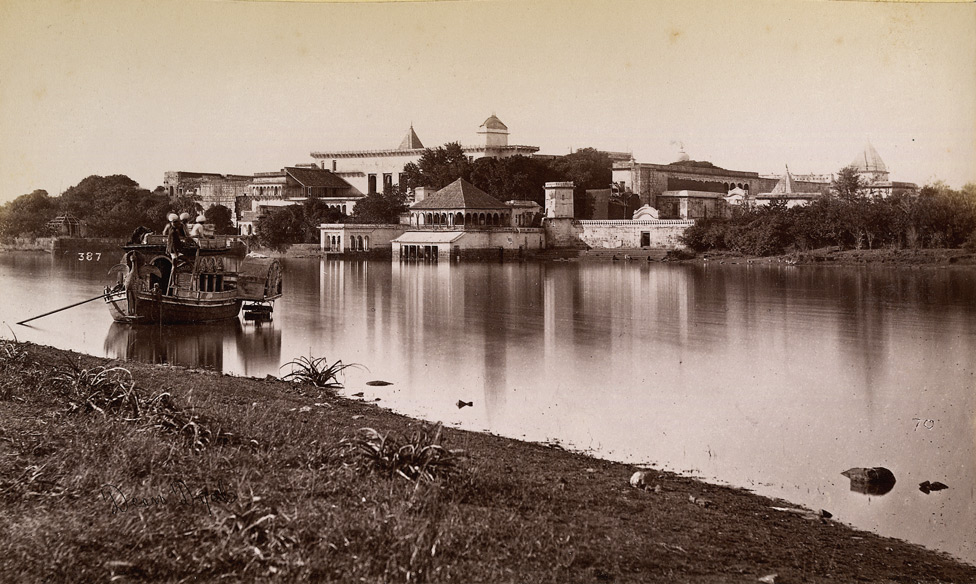
Govindgarh Palace in 1870

During his rule, the settlement of Govindgarh was founded, and a large reservoir named Vishwanath Sagar was excavated. He commissioned the construction of the Govindgarh Palace, located on an island in the middle of Govindgarh Lake. Govindgarh became noted for its diverse varieties of mangoes.

== Honours ==
- Knight Grand Commander of the Order of the Star of India (KSI) (10 December 1864), GCSI 24 May 1866.

Raghuraj Singh of Rewa Baghel dynasty of Rewa
Regnal titles
Preceded by Maharaja Raghuraj Singh	Maharaja of Rewa; 1854–1880	Succeeded by Sir Venkat Raman Ramanuj Prasad Singh Ju Deo
