= Govindgarh Palace =

Palace in Govindgarh, Madhya Pradesh, India

Coordinates: 24°22′16″N 81°17′38.25″E

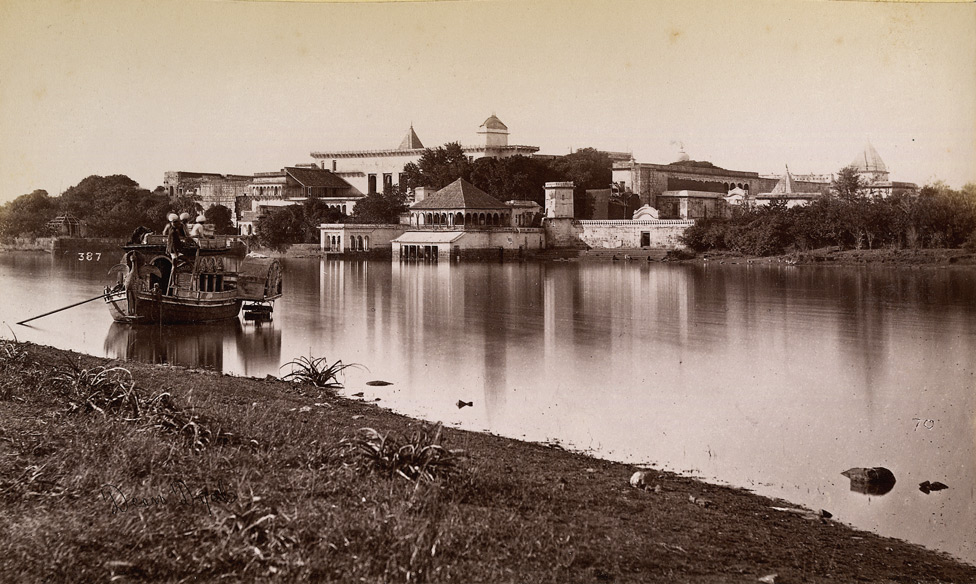
Govindgarh Palace in 1870

Govindgarh Palace, also known as Govindgarh Fort, is a palace located in Govindgarh, Madhya Pradesh, India. Built in the 19th century by the ruler of Rewa, the fort served as a royal residence on the shores of Lake Govindgarh.

== Description ==
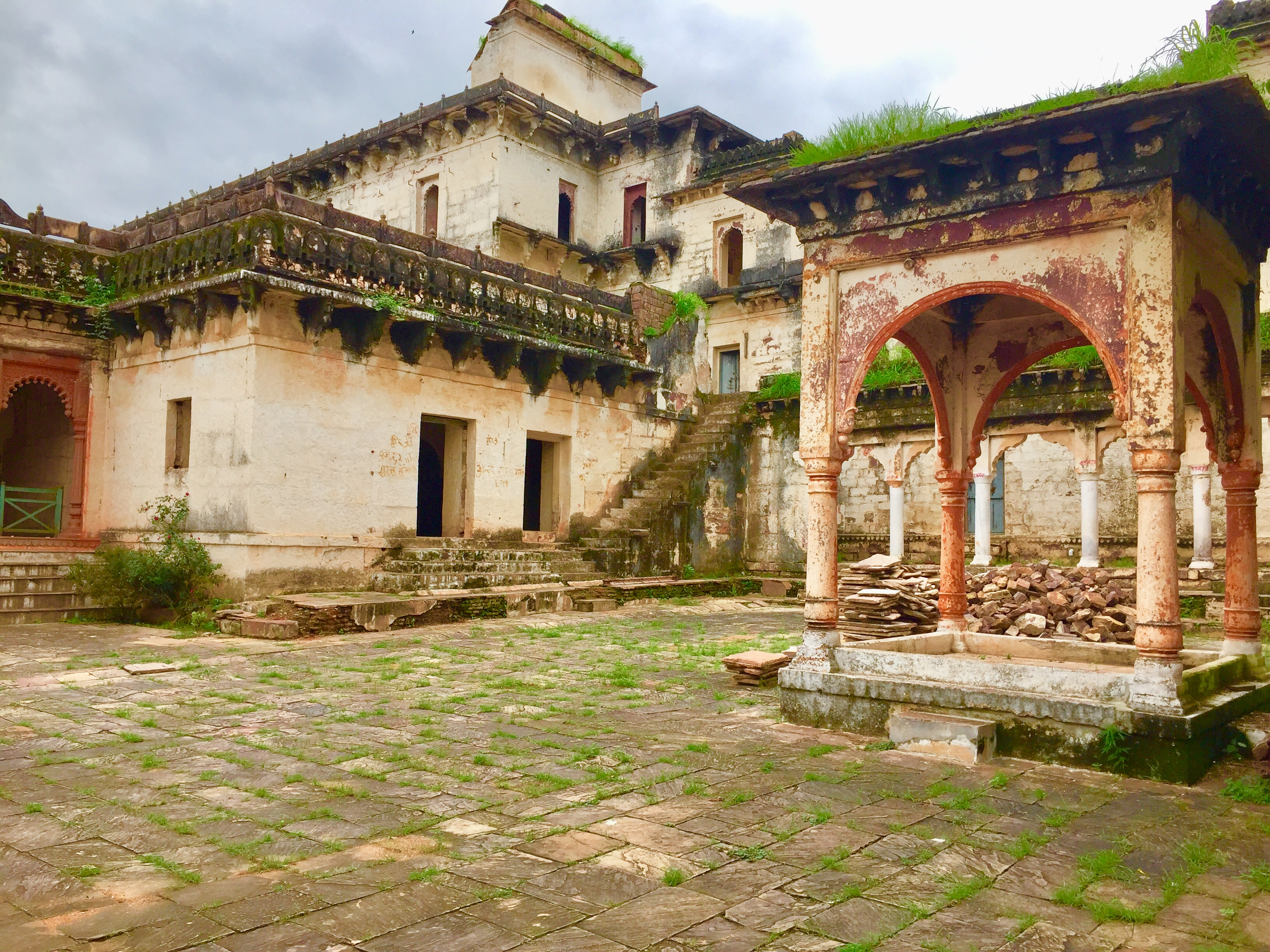
Interior section of the fort in 2018

Govindgarh Fort was built in 1853 by Maharaja Raghuraj Singh, ruler of Rewa and Govindgarh, who used the fort-like structure as a palace. The palace compound contained a number of buildings and temples, and at one point housed Mohan, the first white tiger found in India. The palace remained in use for nearly a century, but Indian Independence and the subsequent decline of the Princely state of Rewa led to the fort being vacated. A museum was later established in the building.

In 2018 it was announced that the fort was going to be refurbished and converted into a luxury hotel.
