= Govindgarh, Madhya Pradesh =

Govindgarh
- city
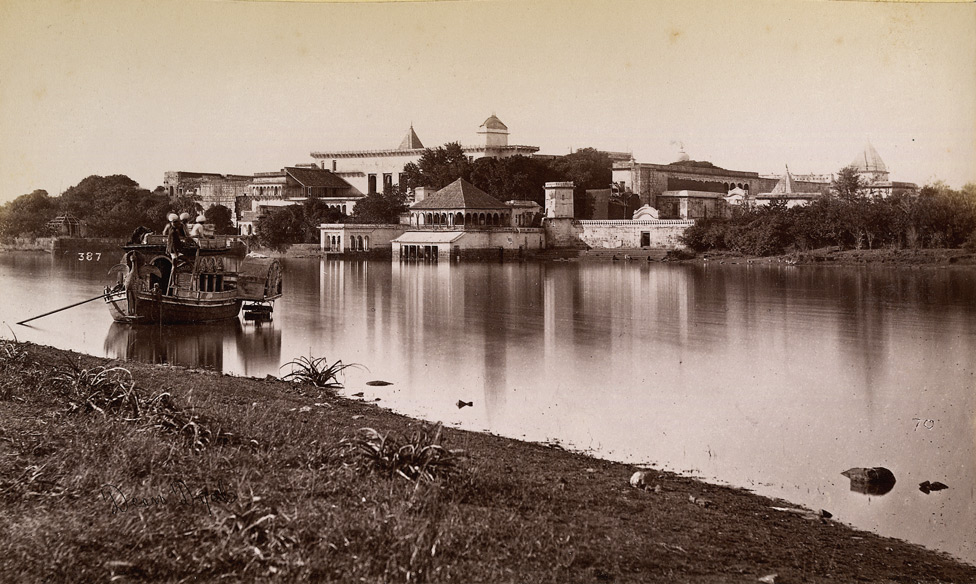
- The Govindgarh palace of the Maharaja of Rewa, 1882

- Location in Madhya Pradesh, India Govindgarh (India)
- Coordinates: 24.38°N 81.3°E
- Country: India
- State: Madhya Pradesh
- District: Rewa
- Elevation: 362 m (1,188 ft)

Population (2001)
  - Total: 9,697

Languages
  - Official: Hindi
- Time zone: UTC+5:30 (IST)
- PIN: 486 550
- ISO 3166 code: IN-MP

Govindgarh is the summer capital of Mahraja Rewa. It is about 18 km from Rewa in Madhya Pradesh, India. Bagheli is the regional language.

== Demographics ==
As of 2001 India census, Govindgarh had a population of 9,697. Males constitute 53% of the population and females 47%. In Govindgarh, 16% of the population is under 6 years of age.
