= Rewa (princely state) =

Princely state in India (1140–1947)

Coordinates: 24.5300°N 81.3000°E

Rewa State
- 1140–1947
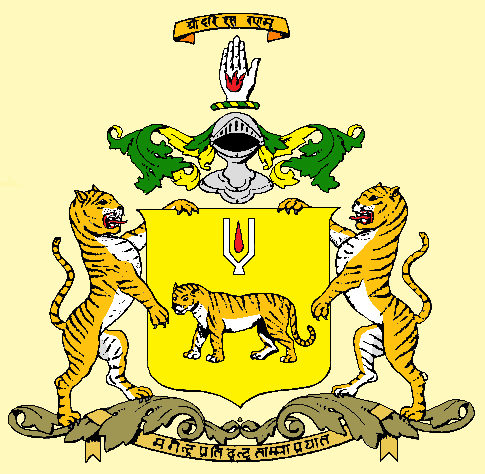
- Flag Coat of arms
- Capital: Bandhavgarh; Rewa
- History
  - Established: 1140
  - Accession to India: 1947

Area
- 1901: 33,670 km^{2} (13,000 sq mi)

Population
  - 1901: 1,327,385
Succeeded by
India
- Today part of: India
- Columbia-Lippincott Gazetteer. (New York: Columbia University Press, 1952) p. 369

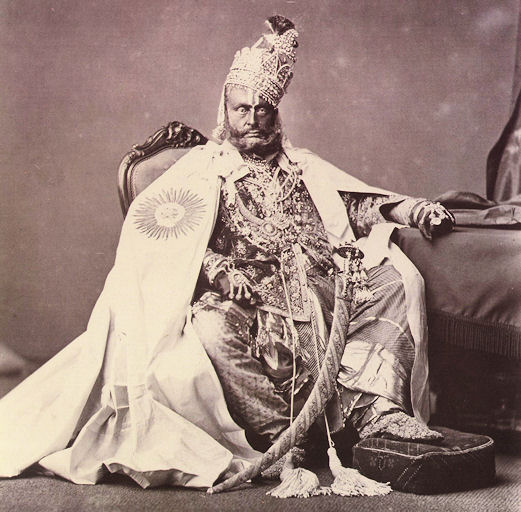
The Maharaja of Rewa, Raghuraj Singh Ju Deo Bahadur in 1877

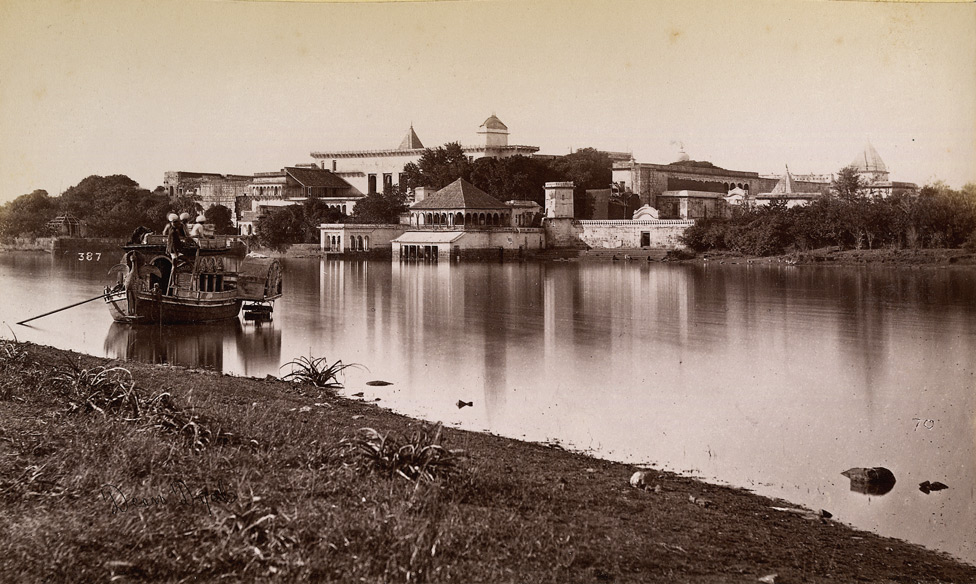
The Govindgarh palace of the Maharaja of Rewa in 1882

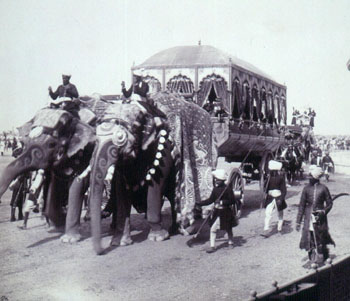
Delhi Durbar of 1903, held to commemorate the coronation of King Edward VII and Queen Alexandra as Emperor and Empress of India: Elephant Carriage of the Maharaja of Rewa at the Retainers' Review, 7 January 1903

Rewa State, formally the Kingdom of Baghelkhand, became a princely state of India, surrounding its eponymous capital, the town of Rewa.

Rewa was the largest princely state in the Baghelkhand Agency and Central India Agency, with an area of 33,670 km². Rewa was also the third-wealthiest principality in Central India, with an average revenue of 2.9 million rupees in 1901. The Baghelkhand Agency was dissolved in 1933, following which Rewa was placed under the authority of the Indore Residency.

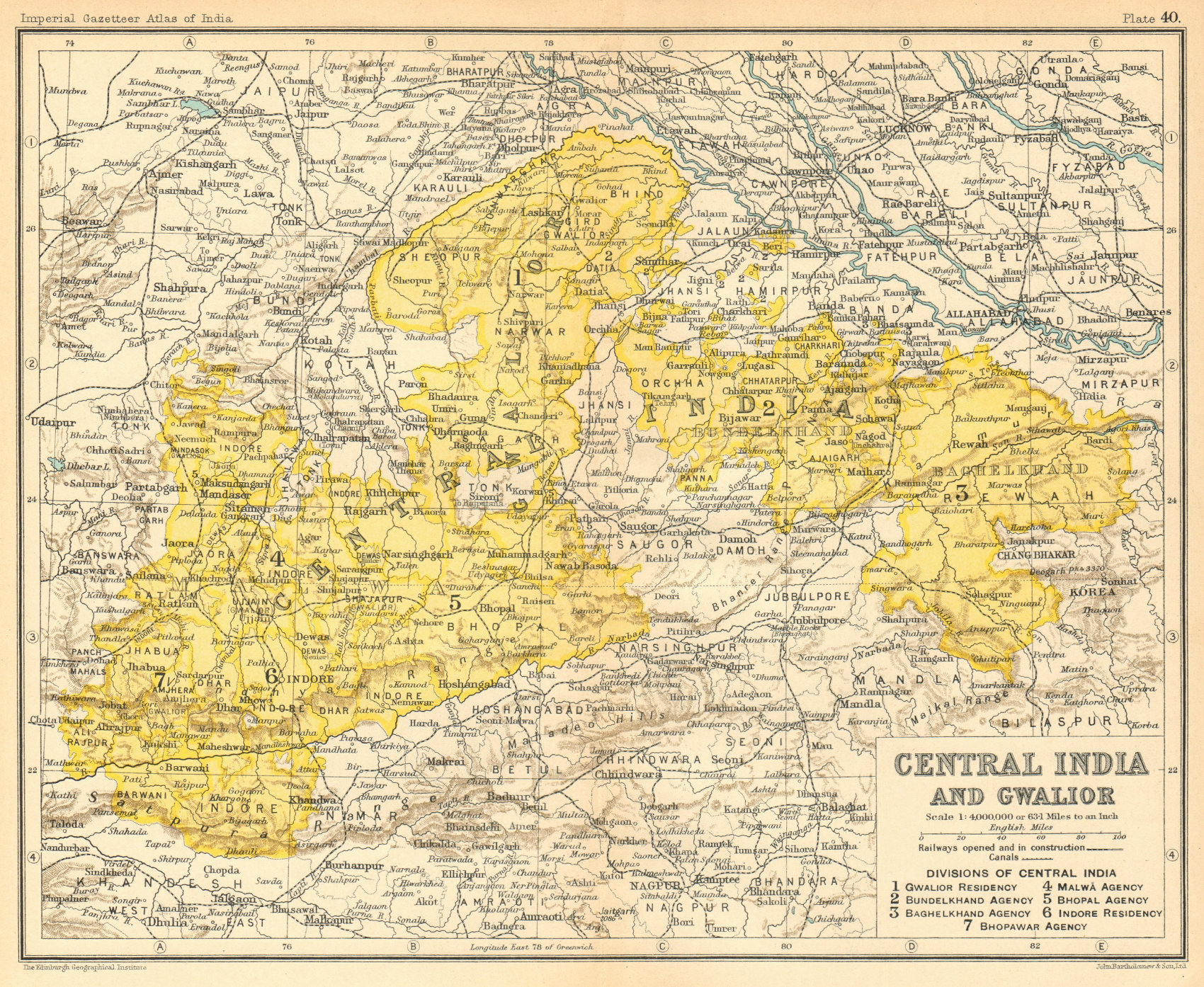
Central India Agency Map

== History ==
According to legend, the kingdom of Rewa was founded around 1140 CE. On 5 October 1812, it became a British protectorate. Between 1 April 1875 and 15 October 1895, Rewa remained under the direct colonial administration of British India.

The ruler of Rewa ruled from Bandhavgarh during the founding reign of Maharaja Vyaghra Dev in 1140 CE, who was a direct descendant of Gujarati warrior king Vir Dhawal of Vaghela dynasty (as spelled Baghel), a Baghel Rajput branch of the Solanki (Chalukyans) clan. In 1617, Maharaja Vikramaditya Singh Baghel moved his capital to Rewa. Maharaja Martand Singh was the last ruler of Rewa who acceded to the Union of India after the independence of India.

Akbar was given refuge at Rewa at age 10, when his father Humayun fled India following a defeat in war. Prince Ramchandra Singh and Akbar grew up together as royal heirs. Maharaja Ramchandra Singh and Akbar remained friends. In the mid-1550s, Raja Ramachandra Singh Baghela maintained a musically talented court, including the legendary Tansen. Two of the Navratnas of Akbar, Tansen and Birbal (originally named Mahesh Das) were sent from Rewa by Maharaja Ramchandra Singh once Akbar became Emperor of India. In 1580, Akbar reorganized his empire into 12 Subahs and combined the provinces of Jaunpur Sultanate, Kara-Manikpur and territory of Bandhogarh into the Subah of Ilahabad.

Raja Vishwanath Singh abolished Sati in the state under British pressure in 1847. During the Indian Rebellion of 1857, Rewa State sided with the British East India Company. Rewa State was important for the British Raj from perspective of logistics as roads and railway lines connecting Gangetic plains to Deccan passed through the state.

Rewa was the first princely state in India to declare Hindi the national language, in the times of Maharaja Gulab Singh. He is also credited for declaring the first responsive government in modern India, providing citizens of Rewa state a right to question their monarch's decisions.

The state came under British paramountcy in 1812 and remained a princely state within the British Raj until India's independence in 1947.

During the long minority of Raja Venkat Raman Singh (b.1876, r.1880–1918), the administration of the state was reformed. In 1901, the town boasted a high school, a "model jail" and two hospitals: the Victoria hospital and the Zenana hospital. However, Lord Irwin criticized the lagging of state in terms of development and he spoke of Rewa's need to end its aloofness with the world and it was still adjudged among the most backward areas of the country by V.P. Menon, after he visited the state in 1947.

During Gulab Singh's reign, the state turned more towards autocracy and regional autonomy with tahsildars needing His Highness' permission for petty decisions.

=== Post-independence period ===
Upon India's independence in 1947, the maharaja of Rewa acceded unto the Dominion of India. Rewa later merged with the Union of India and became part of Vindhya Pradesh, which was formed by the merger of the former princely states of the Baghelkhand and Bundelkhand agencies. Rewa served as the capital of the new state.

In 1956, Vindhya Pradesh was merged with other nearby political entities to form the Indian constitutive state of Madhya Pradesh. The Maharaja's palace was converted into a museum.

In February 2007, an extensive book on the history of Rewa, Baghelkhand, or the Tigers' Lair by Dr D.E.U Baker, was published by Oxford University Press.

== Revolt of 1857 ==
One of the most prominent figures in the region’s revolt was Thakur Ranmat Singh Baghel, a Baghel Rajput Sardar (commander) in the army of His Highness Maharaja Raghuraj Singh of Rewa (princely state), became increasingly discontented with British interference, particularly by the British Resident Political Agent of Rewa State Willoughby Osborne during the Revolt of 1857.

Thakur Ranmat Singh Baghel was born in 1825 in Mankahari Village of Satna, and is the son of Thakur Mahipat Singh Baghel, who was the descendant Kothi royal family of Kothi State and his family historically held a prestigious jagir/estate valued at ₹1.25 lakh annually. The kshatriya blood in his veins was boiling over. His arms were twitching to take on the enemies of the motherland. This was at the time when the First War of Indian Independence, 1857 (Revolt of 1857), was moving towards its end. The British had brought the situation under control and their victory campaign was progressing rapidly. Thakur Ranmat Singh resolved to confront them at this very time.

In Rewa, a Telang Brahmin named Sadashiv was actively encouraging the common people to join the Revolt of 1857 against British authority. He was eventually arrested by the British authorities with the assistance of their informer, Diwan Dinbandhu Pandey of Rewa, and was sentenced to death. However, Ranmat Singh and his uncle Thakur Shyam Shah Baghel, along with their companions, opposed the British action and intervened to secure Sadashiv’s release. Through their efforts, the Telang Brahmin Sadashiv was freed from British custody.

After that Ranmat Singh along with his companions Lal Dheer Singh, Thakur Shyam Shah Baghel, Lal Punjab Singh, Lal Phelwan Singh Chandel, led a group of 2,000 rebels, besieging British Resident Political Agent of Rewa State Willoughby Osborne's bungalow in fury, yelling: O Osborne, come out we shall kill you! nevertheless, but Osborne managed to escape. Near Baraundha, Ranmat Singh fought against the British army, badly defeated them and killed the two British officers, in a garden of village Padra.

According to Shrikrishan Saral in his book "Indian Revolutionaries 1757-1961 (Vol-1): A Comprehensive Study, 1757-1961", Ranmat Singh thought that if one Englishman (Willoughby Osborne) escaped they could easily target another. Ranmat Singh and Shyam Shah along with his companions attacked the British Resident Political Agent Alis of Nagod State. This Resident too escaped and took refuge in Ajaigarh State. In order to protect the fugitive Englishman, the ruler of Ajaigarh State sent an army under Keshri Singh Bundela to confront Ranmat Singh. There was a fierce battle at Bhilsain. Ranmat Singh cut through the enemy forces and came face to face with Keshri Singh. It was an awesome sight to see the two mighty swordsmen contending against each other. Ultimately Ranmat Singh cut Keshri Singh into two with his sword. Encouraged by this victory, Thakur Ranmat Singh invaded the British cantonment at Nowgaon and later confronted the British army at Barongha and destroyed it. Later, Ranmat Singh and Shyam Shah, along with their companions, captured and controlled the Great Deccan Road, disrupting British supply and communication routes between Jabalpur, Allahabad, and Varanasi. According to Rewa historian Nizami Sahab in his article Rewa: Past and Present, this development had considerable strategic significance. At the time, the main travel and postal routes used by the British authorities of the Calcutta Presidency to connect with the Bombay and Madras Presidencies passed through Rewa. Consequently, Rewa occupied a strategically important position, making control of its routes particularly significant during the period.

After that Ranmat Singh and Shyam Shah went into hiding in Keoti Fort. In a battle at the Keoti Fort, he killed the British Colonial who came to arrest him, thereby defeating the British authorities.

The rebels forces of Ranmat Singh continued their struggle, engaging in multiple battles across areas like Nagod, Bhilsain, Chitrakoot, Nowgong, Keoti, and defeated the British forces.

Veer Kunwar Singh of Bihar influenced Ranmat Singh so much that he organize the Anti-British elements and to adopt the course of Revolt. His letters and the secret messages sent to Tatya Tope, Begum Hazrat Mahal, Rana Beni Madhav of Awadh and Veer Kunwar Singh through his associate Lal Punjab Singh reveal that he remained in contact with them and awaited their instructions.

In May 1858, Thakur Ranmat Singh Baghel joined forces with his 300 men along with Farzand Ali in the battle of Kalpi to assist Rani of Jhansi Laxmibai against the British army under the command of Major General Hugh Rose, 1st Baron Strathnairn. Following her defeat and retreat to Gwalior, Ranmat Singh and Farzand Ali returned to the forests of Baghelkhand and Bundelkhand, respectively to continue a localized campaign.

The British force, under the command of Brigadier general Carpenter, engaged the rebel forces of Ranmat Singh in a bloody battle at Chitrakoot in August 1858. Thakur Ranmat Singh gave a very tough fight during the battle but suffered severe injuries during the encounter with Carpenter's forces. He managed to evade capture by fleeing toward Kothi, where Raja Bahadur Avdhoot Singh Baghel of Kothi State provided him with secret shelter, medical assistance, food, and ammunition.

During the Revolt of 1857 in Baghelkhand, the Kothi State (Kothi princely state, Satna) is noted for helping Thakur Ranmat Singh Baghel. Historical accounts mention that Raja Bahadur Avdhoot Singh Baghel of Kothi State provided rebels with shelter, ammunition, food, money, and support for recruiting fighters.

The Maharaja of Rewa wanted Thakur Ranmat Singh Baghel to surrender to the British authorities with the assurance that he would not be killed. According to David E. U. Baker in his book Baghelkhand, or, the Tigers' Lair: Region and Nation in Indian History, Diwan Dinbandhu Pandey of Rewa acted as an informant for the British, which led to the capture of Ranmat Singh by the British authorities when he was resting in the cellar of Jalpa Devi temple at the house of his friend Vijayshankar Nag, Ranmat Singh was arrested, charged with the murder of Europeans, and hanged in August 1860.

Thakur Shyam Shah Baghel, the uncle of Thakur Ranmat Singh Baghel, was one of the prominent leaders of the Revolt of 1857 in Baghelkhand, the first war of India independence. Thakur Shyam Shah Baghel was born in 1822 at Khamariya to Thakur Shiva Singh Baghel (Siva), a descendant of the Kothi royal family of Kothi State. His father held the jagirs of Sumeda, Babupur, Khamariya, and Pureni and served as a Sardar (commander) in the army of the Maharaja of Rewa.

Coming from a wealthy and influential jagirdar family, Thakur Shyam Shah possessed considerable financial resources and property. However, during the Revolt of 1857, he committed his wealth and resources to the struggle against British authority. It is said that he spent his entire fortune, including his property and his wife’s jewellery, in support of the rebellion.

Shyam Shah also sought to strengthen his military force by establishing contact with rebel soldiers. He learned that around 300 soldiers of the Madras Regiment stationed at the British cantonments of Sagar and Damoh had revolted against the British and were present in Jabalpur. In response, he sent his subordinate Bhola Bari to Jabalpur to establish contact with these soldiers. Shyam Shah subsequently enlisted their support and employed them into his freedom struggle against British authority, thereby strengthening the rebel forces operating in the region.

At the same time, Thakur Garud Singh, the Jagirdar of Sohagpur, along with his brother Thakur Bharat Singh, rose in revolt against the British authorities. To suppress the rebellion, the British authorities dispatched a force under the command of Captain Willington. Upon learning of the British advance, Thakur Shyam Shah marched to Sohagpur with around 200 soldiers to support the Jagirdar and his brother in their resistance. A fierce battle subsequently took place between the rebel forces and the British troops. According to the account, Shyam Shah’s forces inflicted a severe defeat on the British contingent, and Captain Willington, the British commander, was killed by Shyam Shah in that battle.

Following this, a large British force under the command of Colonel Robertson advanced from Jabalpur to confront the rebel forces led by Thakur Shyam Shah Baghel. The two forces eventually clashed at Chandiya, near the banks of the Mahanadi River. The British contingent was considerably larger and was supported by well-equipped firearms, guns, and artillery, giving it a significant advantage in conventional warfare.

To counter this superior force, Thakur Shyam Shah adopted a carefully planned military strategy. He divided his rebel forces into two groups and positioned them under the cover of trees, rocks, and the surrounding terrain. The rebels then launched a sudden and unexpected attack on the advancing British troops from two different direction. The surprise assault disrupted the British formation and inflicted heavy casualties on their forces. Unable to withstand the attack, the surviving British soldiers retreated westward in an attempt to save their lives. The encounter at Chandiya thus demonstrated Thakur Shyam Shah Baghel’s tactical ability and his effective use of the local terrain and surprise attacks against a numerically and technologically superior British force. As a result this place is famously Known as Jujhar ghat.

Following the battle at Chandiya, Thakur Shyam Shah learned that the British authorities were looting local traders and businessmen in Katni. In response, he confronted the British forces there and succeeded in defeating them. He subsequently planned to march towards Vijayraghavgarh to support the ruler of Vijayraghavgarh in the struggle against the British. However, owing to the heavy deployment and strict security of British forces in the area, he was unable to reach Vijayraghavgarh. Shyam Shah then proceeded towards the forests of Khakhara in Kothi, where he met his nephew and fellow revolutionary, Thakur Ranmat Singh Baghel. The two leaders joined forces and continued their armed resistance against the British. Together, they fought and defeated the British forces in the areas of Dabhaura and Allahabad.

To protect themselves from the advancing British forces, Ranmat Singh and Shyam Shah, along with their companions, took shelter in Keoti Fort. The British forces, accompanied by troops from Rewa and commanded by Thakur Dalthaman Singh Karchuli, subsequently surrounded the fort. However, Dalthaman Singh was an old acquaintance of Ranmat Singh and Shyam Shah and was sympathetic towards them. Rather than engaging them directly, he secretly alerted the two leaders about the impending arrival of the forces, giving them time to prepare for the confrontation.

A fierce battle with the combined forces of Ranmat Singh and Shyam Shah against the British forces. According to the account, the rebel forces inflicted a severe defeat on the British troops, and during the fighting, Thakur Ranmat Singh killed the British Colonial. Following the battle, the forces of the two leaders separated. Ranmat Singh proceeded towards Bahuti, while Shyam Shah moved towards the forests of Burwa. During this period, Shyam Shah also needed financial resources to sustain his continued struggle against the British. His father had previously given a loan to the Thakur of Deora and Burwa. Shyam Shah initially approached the Thakur of Deora to recover the outstanding amount, intending to use the funds to support his campaign. However, the Thakur of Deora expressed his inability to repay the loan. Shyam Shah then proceeded to the Thakur of Burwa in an attempt to secure financial assistance for his continued resistance against British authority.

During this period, Thakur Shyam Shah fell seriously ill. The Thakur of Burwa told him that he did not have sufficient money at that time, but offered him his place to rest and recover until the necessary funds could be arranged. He assured Shyam Shah that he would try to collect the required money from the Thakur of Chachi.

As Shyam Shah remained at Burwa to recover from his illness, the Thakur of Burwa gradually separated him from his companions by sending them away. ”Consequently, Shyam Shah was left alone at Burwa. The Thakur of Burwa was planning not to repay the debt and also to claim the reward money announced for capturing Thakur Shyam Shah, dead or alive. According to A.U. Siddiqui in his book "Indian freedom movement in princely states of Vindhya Pradesh", following betrayal by Thakur of Burwa along with Randhir Singh of Bhamarha, Devi Singh & Gurupat Singh. Thakur Shyam Shah Baghel was killed by them from behind through deceit and betrayal, serving as a key example of the suppression of local independence movements by the regional loyalist of British authorities.

According to David E.U. Baker in his book "Baghelkhand, or the Tigers’ Lair: Region and Nation in Indian History", Thakur Shyam Shah Baghel led a 300-strong resistance force in the Rewa–Shahdol–Katni region, utilizing guerrilla tactics to disrupt British supply lines during the 1857 Revolt and defeated the British authorities.

Thakur Ranmat Singh Baghel (from Mankhari village, Satna) and his uncle, Thakur Shyam Shah Baghel, were both Sardars (commanders) in the army of Maharaj of Rewa and later were both prominent leaders of the 1857 revolt in Baghelkhand, and they both were descendants of the Kothi royal family of Kothi State, Satna.

To honour the bravery and sacrifice of Thakur Ranmat Singh during the Revolt of 1857 against British rule, the Government of Madhya Pradesh named the Government College in Rewa after him. It is now known as Government Thakur Ranmat Singh College (T.R.S. College), Rewa, Madhya Pradesh.

To honour the bravery and sacrifice of Thakur Shyam Shah during the revolt of 1857 against British rule, the Government of Madhya Pradesh named the Government Medical College in Rewa after him. It is now known as Shyam Shah Medical College (SSMC), Rewa, Madhya Pradesh.

== Rulers ==
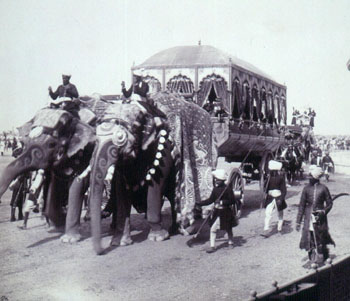
Elephant Carriage of the Maharaja of Rewa, Delhi Durbar of 1903.

The predecessor state, Bandhogarh, was founded c. 1140. Vyaghra Deo, a brother of a ruler of Gujarat, is said to have made his way into northern India around the middle of the 13th century and gained the fort of Marpha, 29 km (18 mi) north-east of Kalinjar. His son Karan deo, married a Kalchuri (Haihaya) princess of Mandla, and received in dowry the fort of Bandhogarh which, until its destruction in 1597 by Akbar, was the Baghela capital. Until the 15th century, the Baghela's of Bandhogarh were engaged in extending their possessions and escaped the attention of the Delhi Sultans, in 1498–1499, Sikandar Lodi failed in his attempt to take the fort of Bandhogarh.

=== List of rulers ===
The following is a list of known rulers of Rewa (or its predecessor state, Bandhogarh), in chronological order by their reign. They took the title of Maharaja.

- Maharaja Vyaghra Deo
- Maharaja Karan Deo
- Maharaja Sohag Deo, established the town of Sohagpur
- Maharaja Sarang Deo
- Maharaja Vilas Deo, established the Bilaspur city.
- Maharaja Bhimal Deo
- Maharaja Anik Deo [Ranik Deo]
- Maharaja Valan Deo
- Maharaja Dalkeshwar Deo
- Maharaja Malkeshwar Deo
- Maharaja Variyar Deo
- Maharaja Bullar Deo
- Maharaja Singh Deo
- Maharaja Bhairam Deo
- Maharaja Narhari Deo
- Maharaja Bheer Deo
- Maharaja Shalivahan Deo, r.1495–1500, Raja of Bandhavgarh
- Maharaja Veer Singh Deo, r. 1500–1540, established the town of Birsinghpur. Veer Singh (Nar Singh) name is mentioned by Babur in Baburnama for assisting Rana Sanga at the Battle of Khanwa in March 16, 1527 with his 4,000 horsemen.
- Maharaja Virbhan Singh, r. 1540–1555; fought against Sher Shah Suri with Chandela Rajputs during the siege of Kalinjar Fort and Sher Shah Suri died in that battle on 22 May 1945.
- Maharaja Ramchandra Singh, r.1555–1592, Tansen and Birbal (Mahesh Das) were in court of Maharaja Ramchandra Singh. Akbar was given refuge at Rewa at age 10, when his father Humayun fled India following a defeat in war. Ramchandra Singh and Akbar grew up together as royal heirs.
- Maharaja Birbhadra Singh Deo, r.1592-1602
- Maharaja Duryodhan Singh, 1602-1618,(deposed). His accession gave rise to disturbances. Akbar intervened, captured and dismantled the Bandhavgarh Fort in 1597, after a war and siege of eight months.
- Maharaja Vikramaditya Deo, r.1618–1630. He founded the town of Rewa in 1618 and transferred the capital from Bandhavgarh to Rewa.
- Maharaja Amar Singh II, r.1630–1643, established the town of Amarpatan.
- Maharaja Anoop Singh Deo, r.1643–1660, established the town of Anuppur. In 1650, when Pahad Singh Bundela of Orchha attacked Rewa, Lal Jagat Rai Singh Baghel of Kothi State and his companions fought alongside the Rewa forces in the city's defence.
- Maharaja Bhao Singh Deo, r.1660–1690.
- Maharaja Anirudh Singh Deo, r.1690–1700, a grandson of Maharaja Anoop Singh, he was adopted by and succeeded his childless uncle, Maharaja Bhao Singh.
- Maharaja Avadhut Singh Deo, r.1700–1755, become the Maharaja at the age of only 9 months The state was sacked by Harde Sah of Panna, c.1731, causing the Raja to flee to Pratapgarh in Oudh (Awadh).
- Maharaja Ajit Singh Deo, r.1755–1809. In the Battle of Naikhai in the year 1796, 200 soldiers of the Rewa State reportedly defeated a Maratha force of nearly 10,000 troops under the command of Maratha commander Nayak Yashwant Rao (Maratha military commander serving under Nawab Ali Bahadur of Banda), who was killed in that battle.
- Maharaja Jai Singh Deo, b.1765, r.1809–1835. In 1812, a body of Pindaris raided Rewa from Mirzapur territory, for which Jai Singh was called upon to accede to a treaty acknowledging the protection of the British Government, and agreed to refer all disputes with neighbouring chiefs to their arbitration and to allow British troops in his territories.
- Maharaja Vishwanath Singh Deo, b.1789, r.1835–1854. He was a deeply scholarly and spiritually inclined ruler who left an indelible mark on the literary heritage of northern India. He was a prolific writer and poet in Hindi and Sanskrit, and is credited with composing "Anand Raghunandan," which many literary historians consider to be the first formal drama written in modern Hindi.
- Maharaja Raghuraj Singh Ju Deo Bahadur, b.1831, r.1854–1857 as Raja, then as Majaraja 1857–1880. He helped the British quell the uprisings in the neighbouring Mandla and Jabalpur districts in the mutiny of 1857. For this service, the Sohagpur (Shahdol) and Amarkantak parganas were restored to his rule (having been seized by the Marathas in the beginning of the century), and Raghuraj Singh was made the first Maharaja of Rewa, ruling until his death on 5 February 1880.
- Maharaja Venkatraman Ramanuj Prasad Singh Ju Deo Bahadur, b.1876, r.1880–1918. Ascending the throne as a minor and gaining full ruling powers in 1895, Maharaja Venkat Raman Singh is remembered as a highly progressive and reform-oriented administrator. He successfully navigated the severe famines of the late 19th century by executing exemplary relief works, building extensive irrigation canals, and facilitating the expansion of railway lines to connect Rewah with major commercial hubs of British India.
- Maharaja Gulab Singh Ju Deo Bahadur, b.1903, r.1918–1946 (deposed by British authorities in 1946 for his freedom struggle), freedom fighter and social reformer.
- Maharaja Martand Singh Ju Deo Bahadur, b.1923, r.1946–1995, Indian wildlife conservationist, former member of parliament from Rewa, and former Rajpramukh of Vindhya Pradesh.
- Maharaja Pushpraj Singh Ju Deo Bahadur, b. 1960, r. 1995–present, former Minister of Education of Madhya Pradesh State.
