= Adhaura, Kaimur =

Adhaura
- Village
- Location in Bihar, India Adhaura (India)
- Coordinates: 24.69743°N 83.6096°E
- Country: India
- State: Bihar
- District: Kaimur

Area
  - Total: 9.57 km^{2} (3.69 sq mi)
- Elevation: 459 m (1,506 ft)

Population (2011)
  - Total: 2,961
  - Density: 309/km^{2} (801/sq mi)

Languages
  - Official: Bhojpuri, Hindi
- Time zone: UTC+5:30 (IST)

Adhaura is a village and corresponding community development block in Kaimur district of Bihar, India. As of 2011, its population was 2,961, in 550 households. The total block population was 57,100, in 9,857 households. It is the least populated block in Kaimur district.

== Geography ==
Adhaura is located 58 km from Bhabua, the Kaimur district headquarters, in a hilly and forested area.

== Demographics ==
As of 2011, the sex ratio of Adhaura block was 926 females to every 1000 males. The sex ratio among the 0-6 age bracket was 958. Members of scheduled castes made up 12.93% of the block's population (the lowest proportion in the district) and members of scheduled tribes made up 51.98% (the highest in the district). The block's literacy rate was 56.34%, the lowest in Kaimur district. Male literacy was 68.96% and female literacy was 42.59%, with the corresponding 26.37% gender literacy gap being the highest in the district.

Most of Adhaura block's workforce was employed in agriculture in 2011, with 23.45% of workers being cultivators who owned or leased their own land and another 65.05% being agricultural labourers who worked someone else's land for wages. 2.99% were household industry workers, and the remaining 8.51% were other workers.

== Villages ==
Adhaura block contains the following villages:

Village name	Total land area (hectares)	Population (in 2011)
Barwan Kalan	3,091	1,387
Barwan Khurd	1,196	705
Manradag	830	0
Chargori	226	0
Bhuruli	485	380
Basnara	686	0
Sarwandag	481	358
Surkur Khurd	620	18
Baghmanian	630	0
Ujari Chargori	297	0
Kharki Khurd	471	118
Kharkiujar	348	0
Tala	637	513
Bhanreha	790	432
Atara	416	18
Bala Khoh	521	58
Garhwa	546	0
Dahar	1,063	1,256
Salea	1,970	453
Karar	1,739	349
Munreha	474	164
Katraur	1,103	167
Lohandi	2,696	0
Jamuninar	1,878	1,627
Kanhanar	799	708
Amahra	846	417
Chaudharna	509	1,066
Khatkhari	499	692
Kuruwasot	587	458
Baghauta	338	314
Dumarkon	368	525
Dighar	1,201	1,495
Kham Khurd	344	192
Kham Kalan	847	743
Pipari	688	139
Pipara	456	391
Gamharia	433	296
Bargaon Kalan	497	619
Garake	609	909
Dhobahi	287	0
Dewri	1,345	653
Sikarwar	632	611
Sikari	495	1,293
Kolhuwa	293	1,464
Gamharia Khurd	228	0
Darihara	441.2	187
Mahkol	559	0
Raipurwa	241	0
Harbhog	553	554
Lewa	541	903
Marapa	619	1,007
Kon Babhani	240	206
Babhani Kalan	697	1,256
Rauta	542	1,016
Chikta	367	0
Patpar	334	210
Garha	406	0
Patai	745	0
Beno	244	0
Chanpura	686	2,319
Kundadih	226	0
Turidag	504	65
Kedala	386	0
Keswa	249	0
Adhaura (block headquarters)	957	2,961
Jharpa	458	283
Bardiha	813	438
Biduri	333	493
Ukhargara	332	36
Baragaon Khurd	872	522
Chorpanian	741	222
Dhenuan	454	43
Bandha	911	256
Tekanian	605	215
Kharaura	170	25
Sarainar	601	376
Bhuiphor	272	847
Bahabar	385	67
Khondhar	1,210.3	306
Goiyan	564	422
Dumrawan	853	974
Pipra	1,344	334
Kothilabar	637	66
Holadih	327	0
Tori	723	523
Banodag	742	193
Dumri	337	0
Bahadag	1,554	523
Barap	1,557	599
Kadhar Khurd	456	182
Kadhar Kalan	2,421	585
Londa	2,513	825
Pachmahut	643	285
Gulu	214	286
Lohra	978	1,151
Har	676	349
Dugha	1,065	1,323
Sahijan	233	71
Athan	673	1,301
Oldag	539	232
Neurus	679	231
Chathans	675	267
Kotamdag	690	283
Chaya, Kaimur	968	371
Chaphana	1,056	822
Chikta	882	236
Parari	676	127
Chumurka	522	196
Dumurka	637	502
Karma	720	326
Kurmura	166	110
Sanraki	1,732	1,311
Jharia	607	38
Dholdag	769	0
Parwania	370	240
Sorha	393	532
Garle	448	146
Sarodag	1,380	1,048
Sari	226	258
Kolhua	389	312
Kuturkha	137	0
Bahera	454	566
Pokhra	370	67
Kesraura Khurd	365	277
Kesraura Kalan	486	448
Bandha	1,048	769
Barikarak	400	135
Sohdag	1,371	369
Jordag	560	504
Salea	254	379
Khukhuman	677	205
