= List of constituencies of the Madhya Pradesh Legislative Assembly =

Madhya Pradesh Legislative Assembly
- 16th Madhya Pradesh Assembly

Type
- Type: Unicameral
- Term limits: 5 years
- Seats: 230

Elections
- Voting system: First past the post
- Last election: 2023

Meeting place
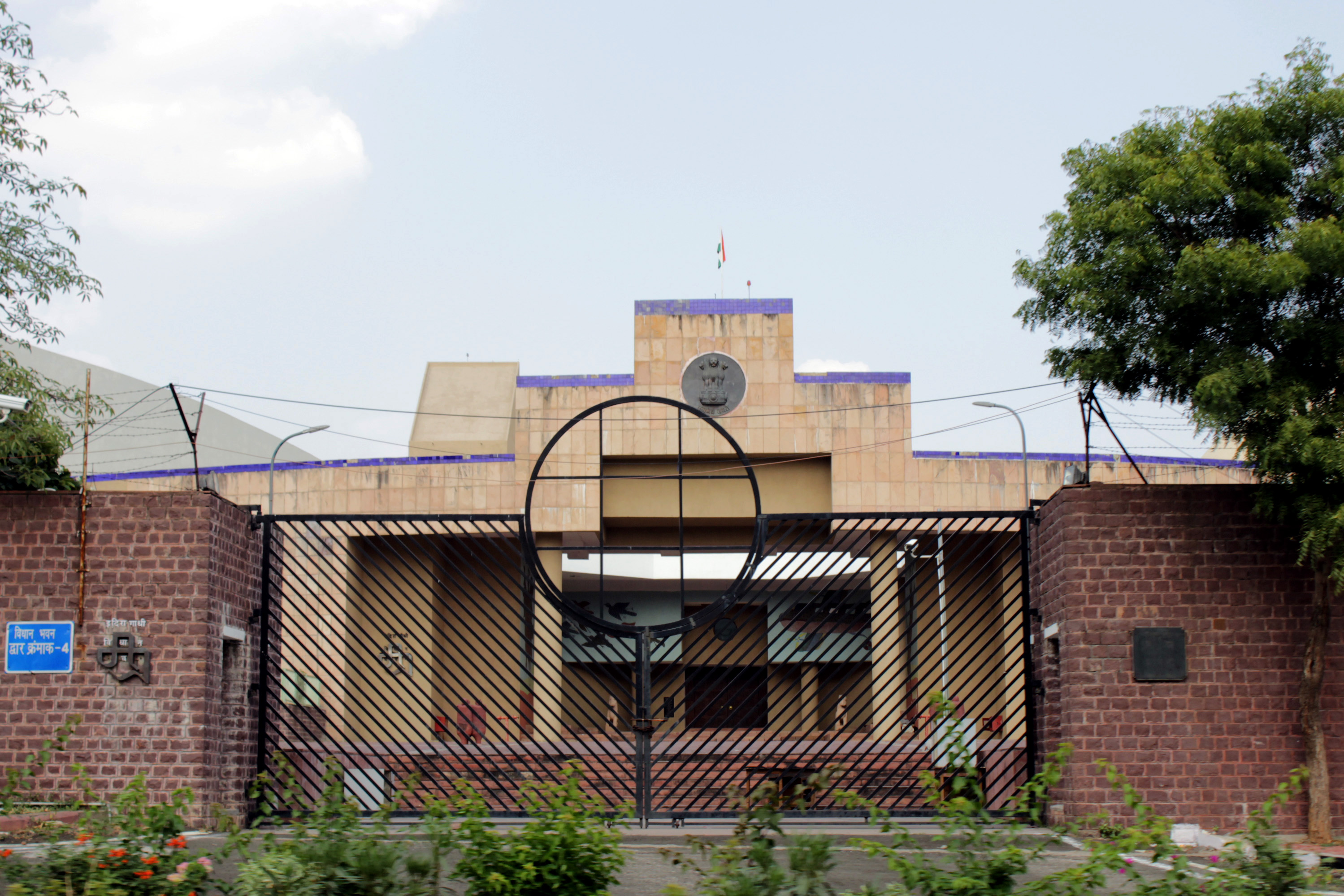
- Vidhan Bhavan, Bhopal, Madhya Pradesh

Website
- www.mpvidhansabha.nic.in

Location of Madhya Pradesh (highlighted in red) within India

The Madhya Pradesh Legislative Assembly is the unicameral legislature of the state of Madhya Pradesh in India. It is housed in the Vidhan Bhavan, a building located at the center of the Capital Complex, in the Arera Hill locality of Bhopal, the capital of the state. Madhya Pradesh is the second-largest state in India, covering 308,245 km^{2} (119,014 sq mi); and the sixth-most populous state with a population of 72.6 million. The term of the assembly is five years, unless it is dissolved early. The Madhya Pradesh Legislative Assembly has had 17 terms since independence. After the latest election in 2023, the assembly is dominated by the governing Bharatiya Janata Party, which won 163 out of the 230 seats. Indian National Congress, the largest opposition party, has 66 seats.

Constituency boundaries are periodically redrawn by the delimitation commission which tries to keep them as geographically compact areas, and with due consideration to existing boundaries of administrative units. The latest census is used to draw the boundaries and every assembly constituency has to be completely within a parliamentary constituency. Since 2000, the Madhya Pradesh Assembly has had 230 single-seat constituencies, each of which directly elects a representative based on a first past the post election.

Since the independence of India, the Scheduled Castes (SC) and Scheduled Tribes (ST) have been given reservation status, guaranteeing political representation, and the Constitution lays down the general principles of positive discrimination for SCs and STs. The 2011 census of India stated that the Scheduled Castes and the Scheduled Tribes constitute a significant portion of the population of the state, at 15.6% and 21.1%, respectively. The Scheduled Tribes have been granted a reservation of 47 seats in the assembly, while 35 constituencies are reserved for candidates of the Scheduled Castes.

== History ==
After the independence of India in 1947, the then province of the Central Provinces and Berar, along with a number of princely states, merged with the Indian Union and became a new state, Madhya Pradesh. The number of constituencies of the legislative assembly of this state was 184, of which 127 were single-member and 48 were double-member. Nine constituencies were reserved for the candidates of the Scheduled Tribes.

Madhya Pradesh was reorganised on 1 November 1956, following the States Reorganisation Act, 1956, merging the old Madhya Pradesh state, Madhya Bharat, Vindhya Pradesh and Bhopal states. The legislative assemblies of all those states were also merged to form the reorganised Madhya Pradesh assembly.

Changes in the constituencies of the Madhya Pradesh Legislative Assembly over time
Year	Act/Order	Explanation	Total seats	Reserved seats		Election(s)
Year	Act/Order	Explanation	Total seats	SC	ST	Election(s)
1950, 1951	Delimitation of Parliamentary and Assembly Constituencies Order, 1951	The Indian Constitution came into effect and new constituencies were created.	184	0	9	1952
1956	States Reorganisation Act, 1956	A re-organised Madhya Pradesh was formed by merging the former states of Madhya Pradesh, Madhya Bharat, Vindhya Pradesh and Bhopal.	288	44	54	1957, 1962
1961	Delimitation of Parliamentary and Assembly Constituencies Order, 1961	There were changes in the number and reservation status of constituencies. Two-member constituencies were abolished.	296	39	61	1967, 1972
1976	Delimitation of Parliamentary and Assembly Constituencies Order, 1976	There were changes in the number and reservation status of constituencies.	320	42	64	1977, 1980, 1985, 1990, 1993, 1998
2001	Madhya Pradesh Reorganisation Act, 2000	The new state of Chhattisgarh was created from the eastern parts of Madhya Pradesh. There were 320 assembly constituencies in undivided Madhya Pradesh. After the split, 230 of them composed the reduced legislative assembly of the state.	230	34	41	2003
2007	Delimitation Commission Order, 2007	There were changes in the reservation status and area covered by constituencies.	230	35	47	2008, 2013, 2018, 2023

== Constituencies ==
Constituencies of Madhya Pradesh

The constituencies of the Madhya Pradesh Legislative Assembly were last delimited in 2008.

Reservation
Scheduled Castes (SC)
Scheduled Tribes (ST)

Constituencies of the Madhya Pradesh Legislative Assembly
#	Name	Reserved for (SC/ST/None)	District	Lok Sabha constituency	Electorate (2023)
1	Sheopur	None	Sheopur	Morena	258,978
2	Vijaypur	None	Sheopur	Morena	253,270
3	Sabalgarh	None	Morena	Morena	233,949
4	Joura	None	Morena	Morena	263,314
5	Sumawali	None	Morena	Morena	256,955
6	Morena	None	Morena	Morena	262,887
7	Dimani	None	Morena	Morena	231,809
8	Ambah	SC	Morena	Morena	241,497
9	Ater	None	Bhind	Bhind	241,065
10	Bhind	None	Bhind	Bhind	275,052
11	Lahar	None	Bhind	Bhind	260,054
12	Mehgaon	None	Bhind	Bhind	279,778
13	Gohad	SC	Bhind	Bhind	239,734
14	Gwalior Rural	None	Gwalior	Gwalior	252,637
15	Gwalior	None	Gwalior	Gwalior	301,011
16	Gwalior East	None	Gwalior	Gwalior	331,630
17	Gwalior South	None	Gwalior	Gwalior	258,312
18	Bhitarwar	None	Gwalior	Gwalior	242,967
19	Dabra	SC	Gwalior	Gwalior	242,370
20	Sewda	None	Datia	Bhind	191,967
21	Bhander	SC	Datia	Bhind	189,931
22	Datia	None	Datia	Bhind	220,407
23	Karera	SC	Shivpuri	Gwalior	265,291
24	Pohari	None	Shivpuri	Gwalior	243,694
25	Shivpuri	None	Shivpuri	Guna	258,600
26	Pichhore	None	Shivpuri	Guna	268,329
27	Kolaras	None	Shivpuri	Guna	252,773
28	Bamori	None	Guna	Guna	225,084
29	Guna	SC	Guna	Guna	235,225
30	Chachoura	None	Guna	Rajgarh	236,729
31	Raghogarh	None	Guna	Rajgarh	236,274
32	Ashok Nagar	SC	Ashok Nagar	Guna	218,548
33	Chanderi	None	Ashok Nagar	Guna	198,156
34	Mungaoli	None	Ashok Nagar	Guna	214,485
35	Bina	SC	Sagar	Sagar	190,652
36	Khurai	None	Sagar	Sagar	213,798
37	Surkhi	None	Sagar	Sagar	224,391
38	Deori	None	Sagar	Damoh	216,497
39	Rehli	None	Sagar	Damoh	243,551
40	Naryoli	SC	Sagar	Sagar	237,119
41	Sagar	None	Sagar	Sagar	209,567
42	Banda	None	Sagar	Damoh	248,191
43	Tikamgarh	None	Tikamgarh	Tikamgarh	225,793
44	Jatara	SC	Tikamgarh	Tikamgarh	220,680
45	Prithvipur	None	Niwari	Tikamgarh	213,152
46	Niwari	None	Niwari	Tikamgarh	198,484
47	Khargapur	None	Tikamgarh	Tikamgarh	249,891
48	Maharajpur	None	Chhatarpur	Tikamgarh	235,760
49	Chandla	SC	Chhatarpur	Khajuraho	236,818
50	Rajnagar	None	Chhatarpur	Khajuraho	250,418
51	Chhatarpur	None	Chhatarpur	Tikamgarh	231,908
52	Bijawar	None	Chhatarpur	Tikamgarh	230,826
53	Malhara	None	Chhatarpur	Damoh	232,780
54	Pathariya	None	Damoh	Damoh	237,247
55	Damoh	None	Damoh	Damoh	245,802
56	Jabera	None	Damoh	Damoh	239,315
57	Hatta	SC	Damoh	Damoh	245,313
58	Pawai	None	Panna	Khajuraho	282,075
59	Gunnaor	SC	Panna	Khajuraho	232,225
60	Panna	None	Panna	Khajuraho	250,874
61	Chitrakoot	None	Satna	Satna	218,918
62	Raigaon	SC	Satna	Satna	220,009
63	Satna	None	Satna	Satna	245,927
64	Nagod	None	Satna	Satna	239,772
65	Maihar	None	Satna	Satna	256,393
66	Amarpatan	None	Satna	Satna	244,847
67	Rampur-Baghelan	None	Satna	Satna	263,598
68	Sirmour	None	Rewa	Rewa	221,009
69	Semariya	None	Rewa	Rewa	226,107
70	Teonthar	None	Rewa	Rewa	217,455
71	Mauganj	None	Mauganj	Rewa	227,922
72	Deotalab	None	Mauganj	Rewa	245,578
73	Mangawan	SC	Rewa	Rewa	249,546
74	Rewa	None	Rewa	Rewa	220,354
75	Gurh	None	Rewa	Rewa	233,285
76	Churhat	None	Sidhi	Sidhi	263,938
77	Sidhi	None	Sidhi	Sidhi	256,381
78	Sihawal	None	Sidhi	Sidhi	253,218
79	Chitrangi	ST	Singrauli	Sidhi	250,982
80	Singrauli	None	Singrauli	Sidhi	216,392
81	Devsar	SC	Singrauli	Sidhi	241,022
82	Dhauhani	ST	Sidhi	Sidhi	251,193
83	Beohari	ST	Shahdol	Sidhi	278,477
84	Jaisingnagar	ST	Shahdol	Shahdol	256,404
85	Jaitpur	ST	Shahdol	Shahdol	246,489
86	Kotma	None	Anuppur	Shahdol	150,471
87	Anuppur	ST	Anuppur	Shahdol	178,516
88	Pushprajgarh	ST	Anuppur	Shahdol	200,528
89	Bandhavgarh	ST	Umaria	Shahdol	229,128
90	Manpur	ST	Umaria	Shahdol	250,377
91	Barwara	ST	Katni	Shahdol	253,593
92	Vijayraghavgarh	None	Katni	Khajuraho	237,367
93	Murwara	None	Katni	Khajuraho	249,888
94	Bahoriband	None	Katni	Khajuraho	244,940
95	Patan	None	Jabalpur	Jabalpur	257,496
96	Bargi	None	Jabalpur	Jabalpur	242,381
97	Jabalpur East	SC	Jabalpur	Jabalpur	247,800
98	Jabalpur North	None	Jabalpur	Jabalpur	216,368
99	Jabalpur Cantonment	None	Jabalpur	Jabalpur	186,628
100	Jabalpur West	None	Jabalpur	Jabalpur	229,742
101	Panagar	None	Jabalpur	Jabalpur	267,844
102	Sihora	ST	Jabalpur	Jabalpur	224,917
103	Shahpura	ST	Dindori	Mandla	267,094
104	Dindori	ST	Dindori	Mandla	247,439
105	Bichhiya	ST	Mandla	Mandla	259,367
106	Niwas	ST	Mandla	Mandla	264,324
107	Mandla	ST	Mandla	Mandla	268,191
108	Baihar	ST	Balaghat	Balaghat	231,680
109	Lanji	None	Balaghat	Balaghat	248,829
110	Paraswada	None	Balaghat	Balaghat	225,714
111	Balaghat	None	Balaghat	Balaghat	233,276
112	Waraseoni	None	Balaghat	Balaghat	204,067
113	Katangi	None	Balaghat	Balaghat	202,615
114	Barghat	ST	Seoni	Balaghat	243,939
115	Seoni	None	Seoni	Balaghat	275,079
116	Keolari	None	Seoni	Mandla	260,431
117	Lakhnadon	ST	Seoni	Mandla	294,731
118	Gotegaon	SC	Narsinghpur	Mandla	216,565
119	Narsingpur	None	Narsinghpur	Hoshangabad	232,123
120	Tendukheda	None	Narsinghpur	Hoshangabad	188,423
121	Gadarwara	None	Narsinghpur	Hoshangabad	212,855
122	Junnardeo	ST	Chhindwara	Chhindwara	221,774
123	Amarwara	ST	Chhindwara	Chhindwara	254,829
124	Chourai	None	Chhindwara	Chhindwara	218,171
125	Saunsar	None	Chhindwara	Chhindwara	210,444
126	Chhindwara	None	Chhindwara	Chhindwara	282,801
127	Parasia	SC	Chhindwara	Chhindwara	218,599
128	Pandhurna	ST	Chhindwara	Chhindwara	214,284
129	Multai	None	Betul	Betul	230,753
130	Amla	SC	Betul	Betul	216,247
131	Betul	None	Betul	Betul	255,497
132	Ghoradongri	ST	Betul	Betul	260,317
133	Bhainsdehi	ST	Betul	Betul	263,093
134	Timarni	ST	Harda	Betul	189,633
135	Harda	None	Harda	Betul	236,012
136	Seoni-Malwa	None	Narmadapuram	Narmadapuram	245,249
137	Narmadapuram	None	Narmadapuram	Narmadapuram	221,218
138	Sohagpur	None	Narmadapuram	Narmadapuram	242,882
139	Pipariya	SC	Narmadapuram	Narmadapuram	230,829
140	Udaipura	None	Raisen	Narmadapuram	261,503
141	Bhojpur	None	Raisen	Vidisha	255,696
142	Sanchi	SC	Raisen	Vidisha	264,257
143	Silwani	None	Raisen	Vidisha	225,073
144	Vidisha	None	Vidisha	Vidisha	226,071
145	Basoda	None	Vidisha	Vidisha	212,363
146	Kurwai	SC	Vidisha	Sagar	234,520
147	Sironj	None	Vidisha	Sagar	221,764
148	Shamshabad	None	Vidisha	Sagar	200,588
149	Berasia	SC	Bhopal	Bhopal	248,208
150	Bhopal Uttar	None	Bhopal	Bhopal	245,515
151	Narela	None	Bhopal	Bhopal	349,333
152	Bhopal Dakshin-Paschim	None	Bhopal	Bhopal	233,193
153	Bhopal Madhya	None	Bhopal	Bhopal	247,587
154	Govindpura	None	Bhopal	Bhopal	393,637
155	Huzur	None	Bhopal	Bhopal	371,115
156	Budhni	None	Sehore	Vidisha	273,906
157	Ashta	SC	Sehore	Dewas	277,494
158	Ichhawar	None	Sehore	Vidisha	225,155
159	Sehore	None	Sehore	Bhopal	221,640
160	Narsinghgarh	None	Rajgarh	Rajgarh	239,323
161	Biaora	None	Rajgarh	Rajgarh	241,297
162	Rajgarh	None	Rajgarh	Rajgarh	231,371
163	Khilchipur	None	Rajgarh	Rajgarh	232,158
164	Sarangpur	SC	Rajgarh	Rajgarh	206,255
165	Susner	None	Agar Malwa	Rajgarh	235,262
166	Agar	SC	Agar Malwa	Dewas	233,540
167	Shajapur	None	Shajapur	Dewas	244,174
168	Shujalpur	None	Shajapur	Dewas	217,796
169	Kalapipal	None	Shajapur	Dewas	227,484
170	Sonkatch	SC	Dewas	Dewas	234,272
171	Dewas	None	Dewas	Dewas	282,034
172	Hatpipliya	None	Dewas	Dewas	207,956
173	Khategaon	None	Dewas	Vidisha	235,697
174	Bagli	ST	Dewas	Khandwa	254,178
175	Mandhata	None	Khandwa	Khandwa	216,266
176	Harsud	ST	Khandwa	Betul	227,056
177	Khandwa	SC	Khandwa	Khandwa	272,327
178	Pandhana	ST	Khandwa	Khandwa	282,159
179	Nepanagar	ST	Burhanpur	Khandwa	262,870
180	Burhanpur	None	Burhanpur	Khandwa	320,308
181	Bhikangaon	ST	Khargone	Khandwa	248,866
182	Badwaha	None	Khargone	Khandwa	232,016
183	Maheshwar	SC	Khargone	Khargone	226,813
184	Kasrawad	None	Khargone	Khargone	238,160
185	Khargone	None	Khargone	Khargone	242,862
186	Bhagwanpura	ST	Khargone	Khargone	252,696
187	Sendhawa	ST	Barwani	Khargone	284,428
188	Rajpur	ST	Barwani	Khargone	252,791
189	Pansemal	ST	Barwani	Khargone	256,787
190	Barwani	ST	Barwani	Khargone	275,325
191	Alirajpur	ST	Alirajpur	Ratlam	264,887
192	Jobat	ST	Alirajpur	Ratlam	301,436
193	Jhabua	ST	Jhabua	Ratlam	312,336
194	Thandla	ST	Jhabua	Ratlam	264,577
195	Petlawad	ST	Jhabua	Ratlam	287,670
196	Sardarpur	ST	Dhar	Dhar	225,609
197	Gandhwani	ST	Dhar	Dhar	247,168
198	Kukshi	ST	Dhar	Dhar	246,580
199	Manawar	ST	Dhar	Dhar	242,074
200	Dharampuri	ST	Dhar	Dhar	218,956
201	Dhar	None	Dhar	Dhar	257,892
202	Badnawar	None	Dhar	Dhar	220,294
203	Depalpur	None	Indore	Indore	266,762
204	Indore-1	None	Indore	Indore	363,935
205	Indore-2	None	Indore	Indore	347,651
206	Indore-3	None	Indore	Indore	187,245
207	Indore-4	None	Indore	Indore	239,639
208	Indore-5	None	Indore	Indore	412,048
209	Dr. Ambedkar Nagar-Mhow	None	Indore	Dhar	280,726
210	Rau	None	Indore	Indore	356,758
211	Sanwer	SC	Indore	Indore	302,465
212	Nagda-Khachrod	None	Ujjain	Ujjain	220,941
213	Mahidpur	None	Ujjain	Ujjain	215,189
214	Tarana	SC	Ujjain	Ujjain	187,690
215	Ghatiya	SC	Ujjain	Ujjain	222,709
216	Ujjain North	None	Ujjain	Ujjain	227,095
217	Ujjain South	None	Ujjain	Ujjain	257,223
218	Badnagar	None	Ujjain	Ujjain	203,691
219	Ratlam Rural	ST	Ratlam	Ratlam	213,309
220	Ratlam City	None	Ratlam	Ratlam	216,483
221	Sailana	ST	Ratlam	Ratlam	210,136
222	Jaora	None	Ratlam	Mandsour	237,650
223	Alot	SC	Ratlam	Ujjain	222,192
224	Mandsaur	None	Mandsaur	Mandsour	260,395
225	Malhargarh	SC	Mandsaur	Mandsour	245,686
226	Suwasra	None	Mandsaur	Mandsour	278,141
227	Garoth	None	Mandsaur	Mandsour	250,266
228	Manasa	None	Neemuch	Mandsour	200,107
229	Neemuch	None	Neemuch	Mandsour	229,060
230	Jawad	None	Neemuch	Mandsour	181,674

== See also ==
- List of constituencies of the Chhattisgarh Legislative Assembly
