= Riti Pathak =

Indian politician

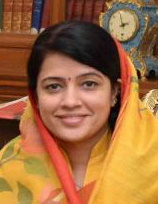

Member of the Madhya Pradesh Legislative Assembly
- Incumbent
- Assumed office 3 December 2023
- Preceded by: Kedarnath Shukla
- Constituency: Sidhi

Member of Parliament, Lok Sabha
- In office 16 May 2014 – 6 December 2023
- Preceded by: Govind Prasad Mishra
- Succeeded by: Rajesh Mishra
- Constituency: Sidhi

Personal details
- Born: 1 July 1977 (age 49) Khatkhari, Madhya Pradesh, India
- Party: Bharatiya Janata Party
- Spouse: Shri Rajnish Pathak
- Children: 2
- Parent(s): Shri Ramkaran Dev Pandey & Smt. Shyama Pandey
- Education: Awadhesh Pratap Singh University, Rewa
- Occupation: Advocate
- Website: ritipathak.com
- As of 16 December, 2016

Riti Pathak (born 1 July 1977; Hindi pronunciation: [ɾiːt̪ɪ paːʈʰək]) is a member of the Member of the Madhya Pradesh Legislative Assembly from Sidhi in Madhya Pradesh who belongs to Bharatiya Janata Party. She was first elected to the Lok Sabha in the 2014 Lok Sabha elections as a candidate of the Bharatiya Janata Party from Sidhi seat of Madhya Pradesh, and won seat by defeating the INC candidate by a margin of 1,08,046 votes. She was re-elected to the 17th Loksabha in 2019. She won the Sidhi seat again by defeating the Congress candidate Shri Ajay Singh by a margin of 2,86,520 votes.

== Early life, education, and personal life ==
Riti Pathak (born Riti Pandey) was born on 1 July 1977 in Village Khatkhari of District Sidhi, Madhya Pradesh (present-day District Singrauli, Madhya Pradesh) to Smt. Shyama Pandey (Homemaker) and Shri Ramkaran Dev Pandey (Lawyer).

She was brought up in Rewa. She did her bachelor's degree (BA) in history and Hindi literature followed by master's degree in history (from Girls Degree College, Rewa). Then she completed her graduation in LLB (The Bachelor of Laws).

While in School and college she was also active in co-curricular activities and completed her all three NCC certificates by her graduation. She was Joint Secretary at GDC in 1994-95.

In the year 1997, she married Shri Rajneesh Pathak.

- M.A. From Avdhesh Pratap Singh university, Rewa in 1999,
- L.L.B. From Avdhesh Pratap Singh University Rewa in 2002

== Social work and politics ==
With inspiration and support from her family, she started social works for women in her home constituency area. She was introduced to politics when she contested Jila Panchayat Adhyaksh, Sidhi and won. In her Jila Panchayat era, she also had support of prominent political figure of Madhya pradesh (state level politician), congress MLA candidate, current Mahamantri of Madhya Pradesh congress, Jila Panchayat chairman of sanchar sankarm samiti and jan nayak of Sidhi Dwarika Prasad Dubey (nausa). Working with a national - state veteran Congress face was a great thing for her. In 2014, she contested the election from constituency Sidhi of Madhya Pradesh and won by the margin of 1,08,046 votes. She was re-elected to the Loksabha in 2019. She is former member of 17th Lok Sabha.

== Positions held ==
- Member, Standing Committee on Coal and Steel (1 September 2014 - 25 May 2019)
- Member, Consultative Committee, Ministry of Rural Development, Panchayati Raj & Drinking Water Sanitation. (1 September 2014 - 25 May 2019)
- Member, Committee on Empowerment of Women (5 February 2015 - 25 May 2019)
- Member, Committee on Public Accounts (1 May 2016 - 25 May 2019)
- Zila Panchayat Adhyaksh, 2010 to 2014
- Member of the Madhya Pradesh Legislative Assembly from Sidhi.
