= Sidhi Lok Sabha constituency =

Lok Sabha Constituency in Madhya Pradesh

Coordinates: 24.42°N 81.88°E

Sidhi
- Lok Sabha constituency
- Interactive Map Outlining Sidhi Lok Sabha constituency

Constituency details
- Country: India
- Region: Central India
- State: Madhya Pradesh
- Assembly constituencies: Churhat; Sidhi; Sihawal; Chitrangi; Singrauli; Devsar; Dhauhani; Beohari
- Established: 1952
- Total electors: 20,28,451
- Reservation: None

Member of Parliament
- 18th Lok Sabha
- Incumbent Rajesh Mishra
- Party: Bharatiya Janata Party
- Elected year: 2024

Sidhi Lok Sabha constituency is one of the 29 Lok Sabha constituencies in Madhya Pradesh state in central India. This constituency covers the entire Sidhi and Singrauli districts and part of Shahdol district.

== Assembly segments ==
Presently, after the delimitation of legislative assembly constituencies, Sidhi Lok Sabha constituency comprises the following eight Vidhan Sabha (Legislative Assembly) segments:

#	Name	District	Member	Party	2024 Lead
76	Churhat	Sidhi	Ajay Arjun Singh	INC	BJP
77	Sidhi	Sidhi	Riti Pathak	BJP	BJP
78	Sihawal	Sidhi	Vishwamitra Pathak	BJP	INC
79	Chitrangi (ST)	Singrauli	Radha Ravindra Singh	BJP	BJP
80	Singrauli	Singrauli	Ram Niwas Shah	BJP	BJP
81	Devsar (SC)	Singrauli	Rajendra Meshram	BJP	BJP
82	Dhauhani (ST)	Sidhi	Kunwar singh tekam	BJP	BJP
83	Beohari (ST)	Shahdol	Sharad Jugal Kol	BJP	BJP

== Members of Parliament ==
Year	Member	Party
1952	Randhaman Singh	Kisan Mazdoor Praja Party
1952	Bhagwan Datta Shastri	Socialist Party
1962	Anand Chandra Joshi	Indian National Congress
1967	Bhanu Prakash Singh	Indian National Congress
1971	Ranbahadur Singh	Independent
1977	Surya Narayan Singh	Janata Party
1980	Motilal Singh	Indian National Congress (I)
1984	Motilal Singh	Indian National Congress
1989	Jagannath Singh	Bharatiya Janata Party
1991	Motilal Singh	Indian National Congress
1996	Tilak Raj Singh	All India Indira Congress (T)
1998	Jagannath Singh	Bharatiya Janata Party
1999	Chandra Pratap Singh	Bharatiya Janata Party
2004	Chandra Pratap Singh	Bharatiya Janata Party
2007^	Manik Singh	Indian National Congress
2009	Govind Prasad Mishra	Bharatiya Janata Party
2014	Riti Pathak	Bharatiya Janata Party
2019	Riti Pathak	Bharatiya Janata Party
2024	Rajesh Mishra	Bharatiya Janata Party

== Election results ==
=== General Elections 2024 ===
2024 Indian general election: Sidhi
Party	Candidate	Votes	%	±%
BJP	Rajesh Mishra	5,83,559	50.87	−3.57
INC	Kamleshwar Patel	3,77,143	32.87	+0.76
BSP	Pujan Ram Saket	50,962	4.44	+3.11
GGP	Ajay Pratap Singh	33,656	2.93	+0.86
CPI	Sanjay Namdeo	20,290	1.77	−0.39
RSPS	Ramvishal Kol	2,087	0.18	new
NOTA	None of the above	4,216	0.37	−0.07
Majority		2,06,416	18	−4.33
Turnout		11,46,150 (Note: does not include postal ballots)	56.50	▼13.00
BJP hold		Swing		

=== General Elections 2019 ===
2019 Indian general elections: Sidhi
Party	Candidate	Votes	%	±%
BJP	Riti Pathak	698,342	54.44	+6.37
INC	Ajay Singh	4,11,818	32.11	−5.04
BSP	Ramlal Panika	26,540	2.07	−1.91
GGP	Fatte Bahadur Singh Markam	17,032	1.33	−1.02
CPI	Sanjay Namdeo	27,651	2.16	new
Independent	Dileep Kumar Shukla	15,555	1.21	+0.13
NOTA	None of the above	5,627	0.44	−1.31
Majority		2,86,524	22.33	−11.41
Turnout		12,82,705	69.50	+12.50
BJP hold		Swing		

=== General Elections 2014 ===
2014 Indian general elections: Sidhi
Party	Candidate	Votes	%	±%
BJP	Riti Pathak	475,678	48.07	▲7.99
INC	Indrajeet Patel	3,67,632	37.15	▲3.83
BSP	Rama Shankar Shahwal	39,387	3.98	▼3.97
GGP	Pushpendra Singh	23,298	2.35	N/A
Independent	Bhagwati Charan Pandey	10,725	1.08	N/A
NOTA	None of the above	17,350	1.75	N/A
Majority		1,08,046	10.92	▲4.15
Turnout		9,89,576	57.00	▲7.25
BJP hold		Swing		

=== General Elections 2009 ===
2009 Indian general elections: Sidhi
Party	Candidate	Votes	%	±%
BJP	Govind Prasad Mishra	270,914	40.08	N/A
INC	Indrajeet Patel	2,25,174	33.32	N/A
Independent	Veena Singh	66,985	9.91	N/A
BSP	Ashok Kumar Shah	53,760	7.95	N/A
Majority		45,740	6.77	N/A
Turnout		6,75,807	49.75	N/A
BJP hold		Swing		

== See also ==
- Sidhi district
- List of constituencies of the Lok Sabha
