= Devsar Assembly constituency =

Devsar Assembly constituency may refer to:

- Devsar, Jammu and Kashmir Assembly constituency
- Devsar, Madhya Pradesh Assembly constituency
