= Shiv Bahadur Singh =

Rao Shiv Bahadur Singh (1894–1955) was an Indian politician with the Indian National Congress party, who was convicted in 1950 of taking bribes to issue a forged document for a diamond mining firm. He was sentenced to three years imprisonment and expelled from the Congress Party.

== Life ==
A jagirdaar or landlord from Churhat, Madhya Pradesh, Shiv Bahadur Singh was the 26th "Rao" of Churhat, a branch of the Rewa royal line. Around the time of independence, he joined the Congress Party and was one of the leaders of the party in Madhya Pradesh.

In 1950, Shiv Bahadur Singh was convicted for forging official documents that permitted the closed Panna Diamond Mining syndicate to resume operations, in return for which he was paid a bribe of Rs. 25,000 by Nagindas Mehta of the firm, on 1949-04-11 at the Constitution House New Delhi.

The forgeries were backdated to the period when he had been minister in the then state of Vindhya Pradesh (before it was merged with Madhya Pradesh in 1956). Neither the fact of the bribe nor the forgery were contested in several subsequent appeals.

In the legal trial, he was initially acquitted by a special court, but the state appealed to the Judicial Commissioner (predecessor to the present court system) where he was found guilty under articles relating to forgery, criminal conspiracy, and "illegal gratification by a public servant". He was sentenced to rigorous imprisonment for three years, while a bureaucrat who connived in the operation was sentenced for one year.

In the ensuing scandal, Shiv Bahadur Singh was expelled from the Congress party.

He was the father of Congress party stalwart Arjun Singh, who has served as Chief Minister of Madhya Pradesh and the former Human Resource Development Minister in the Manmohan Singh government.

== Supreme Court appeal ==
In 1953, Shiv Bahadur Singh appealed this judgment to the Supreme Court, but the argument never made the case that he was innocent of the charges. The judgment in the case, which argued a number of points relating to legal minutiae, remains an oft-cited legal landmark for these technical questions. The lawyers for Singh, headed by Rajinder Narain, argued that

- there was no specific provision that the State could appeal the decision of the lower court. While this may be a lacuna in the law, it should be respected. This contention was overruled, looking at the spirit of the text pertaining to appeals.
- the criminal laws under which they were convicted were legislated in September 1949, whereas the crime occurred in March, thus the law was not "in force at the time of the commission of the act" (Article 20 of the constitution). However, this was overruled since the " criminal law relating to the offences charged against the appellants at the time of their commission was substantially the same as that which obtained at the time of the convictions".
- that the bribe was taken in Delhi, which is outside the jurisdiction of the Vindhya Pradesh court that tried him (this was also overruled).

Thus the appeal was reversed on all counts, and the case was referred to be heard on the "merits". Since the merits were not contested, Shiv Bahadur Singh remained imprisoned and died while in prison.
