= Radha Ravindra Singh =

Indian politician

Member of the Madhya Pradesh Legislative Assembly
- Incumbent
- Assumed office 2023
- Preceded by: Amar Singh
- Constituency: Chitrangi

Personal details
- Born: 1 January 1975 (age 51) [[Singrauli Waidhan district]]
- Party: Bharatiya Janata Party
- Education: Master of Arts
- Alma mater: Awadhesh Pratap Singh University
- Occupation: Politician

Radha Ravindra Singh (born 1 January 1975) is an Indian politician from Madhya Pradesh. She is an MLA of Bharatiya Janata Party from Chitrangi Assembly Constituency, which is reserved for ST community in Singrauli district. She won the 2023 Madhya Pradesh Legislative Assembly election. She served as the Minister of State for Panchayat and Rural Development.

== Early life and education ==
Singh belongs to a tribal community in Singrauli district. She is the daughter-in-law of former minister Jagannath Singh. She completed her Master of Arts in Political Science in 2005, from Awadhesh Pratap Singh University, Rewa, MP.

== Career ==
Singh won the 2023 Madhya Pradesh Legislative Assembly election representing Bharatiya Janata Party from Chitrangi Assembly Constituency. She defeated Manik Singh of Indian National Congress by a huge margin of 59,879 votes.
