= Motilal Singh =

Indian politician

Member of Parliament, Lok Sabha
- In office 1980–1989
- Preceded by: Surya Narayan Singh
- Succeeded by: Jagannath Singh
- In office 1991–1996
- Preceded by: Jagannath Singh
- Succeeded by: Jagannath Singh
- Constituency: Sidhi, Madhya Pradesh

Personal details
- Born: 8 April 1943 (age 83)
- Party: Indian National Congress
- Spouse: Basumati Singh

Motilal Singh is an Indian politician. He was elected to the Lok Sabha, lower house of the Parliament of India from Sidhi, Madhya Pradesh as a member of the Indian National Congress.
