= Indrajeet Patel =

Indrajeet Patel may refer to:

- Indrajeet Patel (politician) (1945–2018), Indian politician and representative for Madhya Pradesh
- Indrajeet Patel (runner) (born 1994), Indian distance runner
