= Bhanu Prakash Singh =

Indian politician (1929–2019)

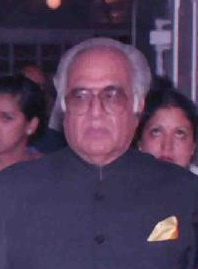

Governor of Goa
- In office 18 March 1991 – 3 April 1994
- Preceded by: Khurshed Alam Khan
- Succeeded by: B. Rachaiah

Member of Parliament, Lok Sabha
- In office 1967–1971
- Preceded by: Anand Chandra Joshi
- Succeeded by: Ranbahadur Singh
- Constituency: Sidhi
- In office 1962–1967
- Succeeded by: Babu Bhai Patil
- Constituency: Rajgarh

Personal details
- Born: 22 July 1929 Narsinghgarh State, British India
- Died: 24 January 2019 (aged 89)
- Party: Indian National Congress
- Spouse: Lakshmi Kumari

Bhanu Prakash Singh was an Indian politician. He was the Governor of Goa. He was elected to the Lok Sabha, the lower house of the Parliament of India as a member of the Indian National Congress.
