= Churhat Assembly constituency =

Constituency of the Madhya Pradesh legislative assembly in India

Coordinates: 24.42°N 81.68°E

Churhat
- Constituency No. 76 for the Madhya Pradesh Legislative Assembly

Constituency details
- Country: India
- Region: Central India
- State: Madhya Pradesh
- District: Sidhi
- Lok Sabha constituency: Sidhi
- Established: 1967
- Reservation: None

Member of Legislative Assembly
- 16th Madhya Pradesh Legislative Assembly
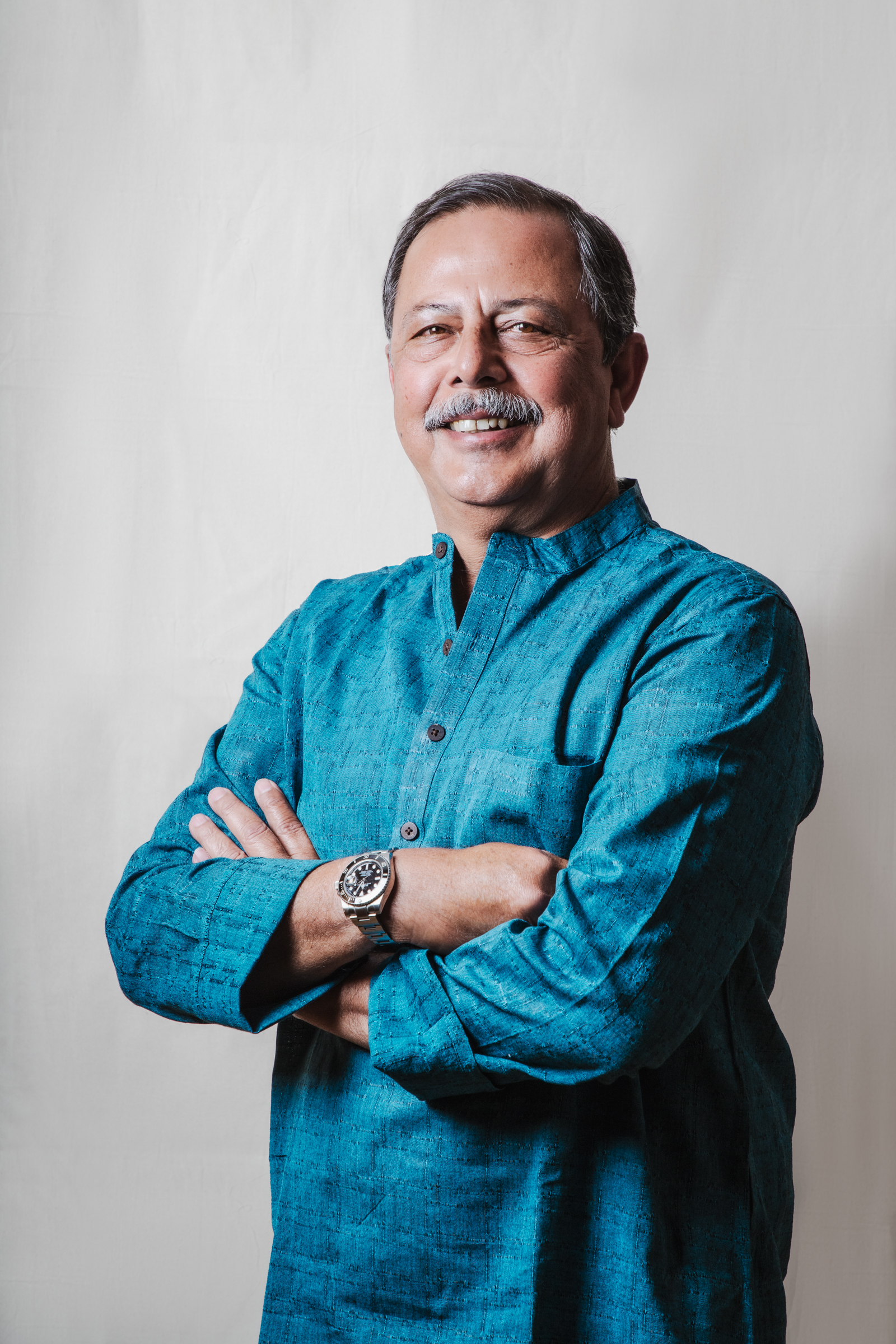
- Incumbent Ajay Arjun Singh
- Party: Indian National Congress
- Elected year: 2023
- Preceded by: Sharadendu Tiwari

Churhat Assembly constituency is one of the 230 constituencies of Madhya Pradesh Legislative Assembly. It is a segment of Sidhi Lok Sabha constituency.

== Members of Legislative Assembly ==
Election	MLA	Party
1967	Chandra Pratap Tiwari	Praja Socialist Party
1972	Chandra Pratap Tiwari	Indian National Congress
1977	Arjun Singh	Indian National Congress
1980	Arjun Singh	Indian National Congress (Indira)
1985	Arjun Singh	Indian National Congress
1985^	Ajay Singh	Indian National Congress
1990	Arjun Singh	Indian National Congress
1991^	Ajay Singh	Indian National Congress
1993	Govind Prasad Mishra	Bharatiya Janata Party
1998	Ajay Singh	Indian National Congress
2003	Ajay Singh	Indian National Congress
2008	Ajay Singh	Indian National Congress
2013	Ajay Singh	Indian National Congress
2018	Sharadendu Tiwari	Bharatiya Janata Party
2023	Ajay Singh	Indian National Congress

^Bypoll

== Election results ==
=== 2023 ===
2023 Madhya Pradesh Legislative Assembly election: Churhat
Party	Candidate	Votes	%	±%
INC	Ajay Singh	97,517	51.66	+10.24
BJP	Sharadendu Tiwari	69,740	36.95	−8.52
AAP	Anendra Govind Mishra	8,200	4.34	+3.98
Independent	Sunil Soni 'Nirdali'	2,724	1.44	
BSP	Bablu Vishwakarma	1,866	0.99	−0.91
NOTA	None of the above	414	0.22	−0.11
Majority		27,777	14.71	+10.66
Turnout		188,749	71.51	+2.32
INC hold		Swing		

=== 2018 ===
2018 Madhya Pradesh Legislative Assembly election: Churhat
Party	Candidate	Votes	%	±%
BJP	Sharadendu Tiwari	71,909	45.47	
INC	Ajay Singh	65,507	41.42	
BSP	Vivek Kol	2,997	1.9	
Independent	Dadan Singh	2,248	1.42	
CPI	Anand Pandey	1,961	1.24	
Independent	Shri Arjun Prasad Sondhiya	1,692	1.07	
Jan Samman party	Chotu Kol	1,646	1.04	
Independent	Rajiv Kumar Tiwari	1,583	1.0	
NOTA	None of the above	524	0.33	
Majority		6,402	4.05	
Turnout		158,143	69.19	
BJP gain from INC		Swing		

=== 2013 ===
2013 Madhya Pradesh Legislative Assembly election: Churhat
Party	Candidate	Votes	%	±%
INC	Ajay Singh	71,796	48.92	
BJP	Sharadendu Tiwari	52440	35.73	
BSP	Chandrabhan Jaisawal	7044	4.80	N/A
CPI	Anand Pandey	2984	2.03	N/A
BSCP	Daddu Lal Pandey	1908	1.30	
Independent	Dadan Singh Baghel	1697	1.16	
Independent	Mahendra Dixit	1112	0.76	
RPD	Sampati Kumar Chaudhari	901	0.61	
GGP	Kurm Kshatri Patel	819	0.56	
Independent	Hamid Raza Anshari	791	0.54	
SP	Rampratap Singh Yadav	756	0.52	
Independent	Anurag Singh	558	0.38	
LJP	Ramsiya Kol	351	0.24	
AD(K)	Ramnaresh Saket	222	0.15	
SBHSP	Ramakant Pandey	221	0.15	
NOTA	None of the Above	3168	2.16	
Majority				
Turnout		148,589	72.09	
INC hold		Swing		

== See also ==
- Churhat
- Sidhi (Lok Sabha constituency)
- Sidhi district
