= Rajesh Mishra =

Indian politician

Member of Parliament, Lok Sabha
- Incumbent
- Assumed office 4 June 2024
- Preceded by: Riti Pathak
- Constituency: Sidhi

Personal details
- Born: 20 December 1957 (age 68) Sidhi
- Party: BJP
- Spouse: Savitri Mishra
- Parent(s): K.D. Mishra, Shivwati

Rajesh Mishra (Hindi pronunciation: [ɾaːd͡ʒeːʃ mɪʃɾaː]) is an Indian politician. He is a member of the 18th Lok Sabha representing the Sidhi constituency in the state of Madhya Pradesh and the Bharatiya Janata Party (BJP).

== Political career ==
Mishra contested 2008 Madhyapradesh Vidhansabha Election on BSP ticket. Later he came back in the fold of BJP and was appointed district president of BJP. In 2024 he got elected to the Lok Sabha, lower house of the Parliament of India from Sidhi, Madhya Pradesh in the 2024 Indian general election as member of the Bharatiya Janata Party.
