= Sidhi Assembly constituency =

Constituency of the Madhya Pradesh legislative assembly in India

Coordinates: 24.40°N 81.88°E

Sidhi
- Constituency No. 77 for the Madhya Pradesh Legislative Assembly

Constituency details
- Country: India
- Region: Central India
- State: Madhya Pradesh
- District: Sidhi
- Lok Sabha constituency: Sidhi
- Established: 1957
- Reservation: None

Member of Legislative Assembly
- 16th Madhya Pradesh Legislative Assembly
- Incumbent Riti Pathak
- Party: Bharatiya Janata Party
- Elected year: 2023
- Preceded by: Kedarnath Shukla

Sidhi is one of the 230 constituencies of Madhya Pradesh Legislative Assembly. It is a segment of the Sidhi Lok Sabha constituency and is in Sidhi district.

== Members of the Legislative Assembly ==
Election	Name	Party
1957	Chandra Pratap Tiwari	Praja Socialist Party
1962	Chandra Pratap Tiwari	Praja Socialist Party
1967	KP Singh	Praja Socialist Party
1972	Arjun Singh	Indian National Congress
1977	Indrajeet Kumar Patel	Indian National Congress
1980	Indrajeet Kumar Patel	Indian National Congress
1985	Indrajeet Kumar Patel	Indian National Congress
1990	Indrajeet Kumar Patel	Indian National Congress
1993	Indrajeet Kumar Patel	Indian National Congress
1998	Indrajeet Kumar Patel	Indian National Congress
2003	Indrajeet Kumar Patel	Indian National Congress
2008	Kedarnath Shukla	Bharatiya Janata Party
2013	Kedarnath Shukla	Bharatiya Janata Party
2018	Kedarnath Shukla	Bharatiya Janata Party
2023	Riti Pathak	Bharatiya Janata Party

== Election results ==
=== 2023 ===
2023 Madhya Pradesh Legislative Assembly election: Sidhi
Party	Candidate	Votes	%	±%
BJP	Riti Pathak	88,664	10.12	+4.82
INC	Gyan Singh	53,246	30.1	−2.13
Independent	Kedar Nath Shukla	13,856	7.83	
SP	Rampratap Singh Yadav	5,008	2.83	−3.41
BSP	Bhai Ramkhelavan Rajak Urf Khilari Dhobi	3,314	1.87	−3.24
AAP	Anand Mangal Singh	2,735	1.55	+1.1
NOTA	None of the above	654	0.37	−1.48
Majority		35,418	20.02	+6.95
Turnout		176,918	69.01	+0.73
BJP hold		Swing		

=== 2018 ===
2018 Madhya Pradesh Legislative Assembly election: Sidhi
Party	Candidate	Votes	%	±%
BJP	Kedarnath Shukla	69,297	45.3	
INC	Kamleshwar Prasad Dwivedi	49,311	32.23	
SP	Krishn Kumar Singh	9,540	6.24	
BSP	Manoj Kol	7,822	5.11	
Independent	Rampratap Singh Yadav	4,710	3.08	
Independent	Chandra Shekhar Singh	3,532	2.31	
Independent	Shailendra Tiwari (Shailu Dutt)	1,721	1.12	
NOTA	None of the above	2,823	1.85	
Majority		19,986	13.07	
Turnout		152,990	68.28	
BJP hold		Swing		

== See also ==
- Sidhi district
- List of constituencies of the Madhya Pradesh Legislative Assembly
