= Arjun Singh =

Arjun Singh may refer to

- Arjun Singh (Madhya Pradesh politician), Indian politician, Chief Minister of Madhya Pradesh and Union Minister
- Arjun Singh (West Bengal politician), Indian politician in the West Bengal Legislative Assembly
- Arjun Singh (Himachal Pradesh politician), Indian politician in the Himachal Pradesh Legislative Assembly
- Arjun Singh (canoeist), Indian canoeist
- Arjun Singh Atwal (born 1973), Indian professional golfer
- Arjun Singh Jasrotia, Indian military officer, Ashok Chakra awardee
- Arjun Singh Sethi (born 1981), American writer and lawyer
- Jai Arjun Singh, Indian freelance writer and journalist
- Raja Arjun Singh (1829–1890), leader of the Indian Rebellion
- Arjun Singh, titular character of the 1995 Indian film Karan Arjun, portrayed by Shah Rukh Khan
- Arjun Singh, fictional character in the 2007 Indian film Namaste London, portrayed by Akshay Kumar

== See also ==
- Arjan Singh (1919–2017), Marshal of the Indian Air Force
- Officer Arjun Singh IPS Batch 2000, a 2019 Indian police film
