= Singrauli Assembly constituency =

Constituency of the Madhya Pradesh legislative assembly in India

Coordinates: 24.19°N 82.67°E

Singrauli
- Constituency No. 80 for the Madhya Pradesh Legislative Assembly

Constituency details
- Country: India
- Region: Central India
- State: Madhya Pradesh
- District: Singrauli
- Lok Sabha constituency: Sidhi
- Established: 1972
- Reservation: None

Member of Legislative Assembly
- 16th Madhya Pradesh Legislative Assembly
- Incumbent Ram Niwas Shah
- Party: Bharatiya Janata Party
- Elected year: 2023
- Preceded by: Ramlallu Vaishya

Singrauli (sometimes spelled Singarouli) is one of the 230 Vidhan Sabha (Legislative Assembly) constituencies of Madhya Pradesh state in central India.

It comprises parts of Singrauli tehsil, in Singrauli district.

== Members of the Legislative Assembly ==
Year	Member	Party
2008	Ramlallu Vaishya	Bharatiya Janata Party
2013	Ramlallu Vaishya	Bharatiya Janata Party
2018	Ramlallu Vaishya	Bharatiya Janata Party
2023	Ram Niwas Shah	Bharatiya Janata Party

== Election results ==
=== 2023 ===
2023 Madhya Pradesh Legislative Assembly election: Singrauli
Party	Candidate	Votes	%	±%
BJP	Ram Niwas Shah	74,669	46.93	+22.3
INC	Renu Shah	36,692	23.06	+0.93
BSP	Chandra Pratap Vishwakarma	29,673	18.65	+8.55
AAP	Rani Agrawal	8,185	5.14	−16.45
NOTA	None of the above	1,449	0.91	+0.32
Majority		37,977	23.87	+21.37
Turnout		159,105	73.53	+6.0
BJP hold		Swing		

=== 2018 ===
2018 Madhya Pradesh Legislative Assembly election: Singrauli
Party	Candidate	Votes	%	±%
BJP	Ramlallu Vaishya	36,706	24.63	
INC	Renu Shah	32,980	22.13	
AAP	Rani Agrawal	32,167	21.59	
BSP	Suresh Shahwal	15,044	10.1	
Independent	Aravind Singh Chandel	13,876	9.31	
SP	Shikha Singh W/O Omprakash Shingh	4,680	3.14	
CPI	Ashok Kumar Dubey	1,892	1.27	
Independent	Pushpendra Kumar Gupta	1,664	1.12	
Sapaks Party	Ashwani Kumar Tiwari	1,402	0.94	
NOTA	None of the above	882	0.59	
Majority		3,726	2.5	
Turnout		149,017	67.53	
BJP gain from		Swing		

== See also ==
- Singrauli district
- List of constituencies of the Madhya Pradesh Legislative Assembly
