= Chikta =

Village in Auraiya district, Uttar Pradesh, India

Coordinates: 25°11′N 78°49′E

Chikta is a village in the Bidhuna Tehsil of Auraiya district in Uttar Pradesh, India. According to the 2011 census, Chikta has a population of 600: 315 males, 285 females, 114 families. Average Sex Ratio of Chikta village is 905, which is lower than Uttar Pradesh state average of 912. Child Sex Ratio for the Chikta as per census is 731, lower than Uttar Pradesh average of 902.

Chikta village has a higher literacy rate compared to Uttar Pradesh. In 2011, the literacy rate of Chikta village was 75.49% compared to 67.68% of Uttar Pradesh. In Chikta, male literacy stands at 85.93% while female literacy rate was 64.37%.

As per the constitution of India and Panchyati Raaj Act, Chikta village is administrated by Sarpanch (Head of Village) who is elected. Chikta has one Primary School, part of the village of Airwa Katra block in Auraiya. More than 2000 people live in that village.

Since 2015, Chikta has become Gram Panchayat while it was earlier included with Nagla Hirmi Gram Panchayat. In the Gram Panchayat Chikta, there are two villages: Gulalpur & Chikta. According to Local Government Directory, 148056 is Chikta's village code. Chikta is the headquarter of Gram Panchayat. It belongs to Kannauj Lok Sabha Constitution.

- State: Uttar Pradesh
- District: Auraiya
- Taluk: Bidhuna
- Block: Airwa Katra
- Panchayat: Chikta
- Pin Code: 206252
