= Saraswati Singh =

Indian politician

Member of the Madhya Pradesh Legislative Assembly
- Incumbent
- Assumed office 2013
- Preceded by: Jagannath Singh
- Constituency: Chitrangi

Personal details
- Born: 5 January 1980 (age 46)
- Citizenship: India
- Party: INC, (Indian National Congress)
- Spouse: Shivnandan Singh
- Education: SSC
- Profession: Politician

Saraswati Singh is an Indian politician and a member of the Indian National Congress party.

== Political career ==
She became an MLA in 2013.

== See also ==
Twitter Account

- Madhya Pradesh Legislative Assembly
- 2013 Madhya Pradesh Legislative Assembly election
