= Churhat =

- Town
- Location in Madhya Pradesh, India Churhat (India)
- Coordinates: 24°25′34″N 81°40′9″E
- Country: India
- State: Madhya Pradesh
- District: Sidhi

Population (2011)
  - Total: 14,962

Languages
  - Official: Hindi
- Time zone: UTC+5:30 (IST)
- ISO 3166 code: IN-MP
- Vehicle registration: MP-53

Churhat is a town near the town of Sidhi and a nagar panchayat in Sidhi district in the state of Madhya Pradesh, India.

== Demographics ==
As of 2001 India census, Churhat had a population of 13,102. Males constitute 54% of the population and females 46%. Churhat has an average literacy rate of 56%, which is lower than the national average of 59.5%: male literacy is 67% and female literacy is 44%. In Churhat, 17% of the population is under 6 years of age.

== History ==
Churhat Thikana (Jagir) was one of the premier feudatory estates (thikanas) under the Rewa (princely state), located in the historic Baghelkhand region of Central India (now in the Sidhi district of Madhya Pradesh). The ruling house of Churhat belonged to the illustrious Baghel Rajput, who trace their lineage back to the Solanki (Chalukyans) dynasty of Gujarat. The Baghelas migrated to the northern regions of Central India in the 13th century under the leadership of Maharaja Vyaghradev Solanki, eventually establishing the sovereign state of Rewa (princely state).

Over the centuries, as the Rewa state expanded, several cadet branches of the royal family were granted land estates or thikanas for administrative efficiency and military support. Churhat was one such prominent estate granted to a younger branch of the Baghela dynasty and the descendent of Rao Kandhar Dev, ancestor of the Raos of Kasauta (Shankargarh), who was the fifth son of Maharaja Vyaghradev Solanki of Rewa (princely state). The rulers of this estate held the hereditary title of Rao (Raja).

The British Era and Relationship with Rewa State: During the British Raj, Churhat operated under the feudal suzerainty of the Maharaja of Rewa, which was the largest princely state in the Baghelkhand Agency. The Raos of Churhat played a significant role in the administration and military affairs of the Rewa Darbar. They maintained a strong local administration, collected revenues, and resolved local disputes while paying tribute and allegiance to the Maharaja of Rewa (princely state).

The strategic location of Churhat, situated in the fertile plains bordered by the Kaimur Range and the Son River, allowed the estate to flourish politically and agriculturally. The thikana enjoyed considerable autonomy in internal matters but was subject to the overarching British paramountcy mediated through the Rewa State. Detailed historical accounts of the region's administration during this era can be found in the Imperial Gazetteer of India.

Post-Independence and Modern Era: With the integration of Indian princely states into the Union of India in 1947, Churhat was merged into the newly formed state of Vindhya Pradesh, which was later amalgamated into Madhya Pradesh in 1956 under the States Reorganisation Act. The feudal privileges and privy purses of the thikana were eventually abolished by the 26th Amendment to the Constitution of India in 1971.

Despite the end of formal feudal rule, the Churhat royal family transitioned successfully into modern democratic politics, wielding significant influence in post-independence India. The most prominent modern figure from this lineage was Rao Shiv Bahadur Singh, 26th Rao Sahib (Raja) of Churhat, he was granted the title of Raja as a personal distinction, and has served as minister in the Central cabinet under Jawaharlal Nehru.

His son, Arjun Singh (Congress politician), became one of the most influential political stalwarts in modern Indian history. He served as the Chief Minister of Madhya Pradesh on multiple occasions, the Union Minister of Human Resource Development, and the Governor of Punjab during a critical period in the mid-1980s. Today, his descendants, including his son Ajay Arjun Singh (popularly known as Rahul Bhaiya), continue to represent the region in the state legislature, maintaining the family's deep-rooted connection to the people of Churhat and grandson Arunoday Singh is a famous Indian actor.

Presently Rao RAN BAHADUR SINGH, 27th Rao Sahib (Raja) of Churhat since 1955, who married Rani Krishna Kumari, daughter of HH Raja Dileep Singh of Jhabua. Rao Ran Bahadur Singh is the elder brother of Arjun Singh.

== Notable people ==
- Arjun Singh, former Chief Minister of Madhya Pradesh, former Union Minister of Human Resource Development, former Governor of Punjab.
- Ajay Singh, MLA of Churhat constituency, member of the Indian National Congress party, former cabinet minister in Madhya Pradesh govt, former leader of opposition of Madhya Pradesh Legislative Assembly.
- Arunoday Singh, Bollywood actor and son of Ajay Arjun Singh.
