= Indrajeet Patel (politician) =

Indian politician

Indrajeet Kumar Patel

Member of Madhya Pradesh Legislative Assembly
- In office 1977 – 2008
- Preceded by: Arjun Singh
- Succeeded by: Kedarnath Shukla
- Constituency: Sidhi

Personal details
- Born: 5 March 1945
- Died: 18 November 2018 (aged 73)
- Party: Indian National Congress (1977-2009)
- Children: Kamleshwar Patel

Indrajeet Kumar Patel (Hindi: इंद्रजीत कुमार पटेल; 5 March 1945 – 18 November 2018) was an Indian politician from Madhya Pradesh and a member of the Indian National Congress.

Born in Supala, Sidhi district in the central Indian state of Madhya Pradesh, he was a farmer and became involved in politics as a member of his village panchayat. At age 25, he became sarpanch of the village council. He became aligned with the youth wing of the Indian National Congress – the ruling party of the state. He gradually worked his way up the political ladder, serving at district level (tehsil) before being elected to the Madhya Pradesh Legislative Assembly in 1977 from Sidhi. He became Sidhi's chairman of Land Development in 1980 and was director of Madhya Pradesh's State Agro Industries Corporation from 1980 to 1985. He served seven terms as MLA of Sidhi from 1977 to 2008.

He was appointed to the managing committee of Jawaharlal Nehru Agricultural University in 1989 and remained in the position for three years. From the 1990s onwards, he moved away from agricultural politics and into other sectors, including stints as Minister for Housing and Minister of Education, as well as serving as vice-chairman of the State Textile Corporation. In these roles he became a key person in the INC state governments of Arjun Singh and Digvijaya Singh. He lost his seat in 2008 to Kedarnath Shukla of the Bharatiya Janata Party. His son Kamleshwar Patel followed in his father's footsteps and was elected as state representative for Sihawal in 2013. He died in 2018 after a brief illness.
