= Shiv Bhanu Singh Solanki =

Indian politician

Shiv Bhanu Singh Solanki was a leader of Indian National Congress from Madhya Pradesh. He was deputy chief minister in Government of Madhya Pradesh headed by Arjun Singh in 1980. He was elected to Madhya Pradesh Legislative Assembly from Dhar district.
