= Arjun Singh (Congress politician) =

Politician from Madhya Pradesh, India

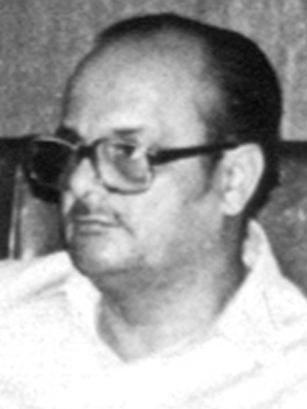

Member of Parliament, Rajya Sabha
- In office 3 April 2000 – 4 March 2011
- Constituency: Madhya Pradesh

Minister of Human Resource Development
- In office 22 May 2004 – 22 May 2009
- Prime Minister: Manmohan Singh
- Preceded by: Murli Manohar Joshi
- Succeeded by: Kapil Sibal
- In office 23 June 1991 – 24 December 1994
- Prime Minister: Pamulaparthi Venkata Narasimha Rao
- Preceded by: Rajmangal Pandey
- Succeeded by: Pamulaparthi Venkata Narasimha Rao

Leader of the House in Lok Sabha
- In office July 10, 1991 – November 20, 1991
- Prime Minister: Pamulaparthi Venkata Narasimha Rao
- Preceded by: Chandra Shekhar
- Succeeded by: Pamulaparthi Venkata Narasimha Rao

Member of Parliament, Lok Sabha
- In office 1991 – 1996
- Preceded by: Sukhendra Singh
- Succeeded by: Sukhlal Kushwaha
- Constituency: Satna
- In office 1985 – 1988
- Preceded by: Lalit Maken
- Succeeded by: Constituency vacant
- Constituency: South Delhi

12th Chief Minister of Madhya Pradesh
- In office 14 February 1988 – 23 January 1989
- Preceded by: Motilal Vora
- Succeeded by: Motilal Vora
- In office 9 June 1980 – 12 March 1985
- Preceded by: Sunder Lal Patwa
- Succeeded by: Motilal Vora

Minister of Communications
- In office 22 October 1986 – 13 February 1988
- Prime Minister: Rajiv Gandhi
- Preceded by: Ram Niwas Mirdha
- Succeeded by: Vasant Sathe

Minister of Commerce
- In office 15 November 1985 – 20 January 1986
- Prime Minister: Rajiv Gandhi
- Preceded by: Vishwanath Pratap Singh
- Succeeded by: Punjala Shiv Shankar

16th Governor of Punjab 3rd Administrator of Chandigarh
- In office 14 March 1985 – 14 November 1985
- President: Giani Zail Singh
- Preceded by: Kershasp Tehmurasp Satarawala
- Succeeded by: Hokishe Sema

Member of Madhya Pradesh Legislative Assembly
- In office 1990 – 1991
- Preceded by: Ajay Singh
- Succeeded by: Ajay Singh
- Constituency: Churhat
- In office 1988 – 1990
- Preceded by: Laxmi Patel
- Succeeded by: Nand Kumar Patel
- Constituency: Kharsia
- In office 1977 – 1985
- Preceded by: Chandra Pratap Tiwari
- Succeeded by: Ajay Singh
- Constituency: Churhat
- In office 1972 – 1977
- Preceded by: KP Singh
- Succeeded by: Indrajeet Patel
- Constituency: Sidhi
- In office 1967 – 1972
- Preceded by: Ranvijaya Pratap Singh
- Succeeded by: Ranvijaya Pratap Singh
- Constituency: Umaria
- In office 1957 – 1967
- Preceded by: Constituency established
- Succeeded by: Constituency dissolved
- Constituency: Majholi

Personal details
- Born: 5 November 1930 Churhat, Bagelkhand Agency, British India
- Died: 4 March 2011 (aged 80) New Delhi, India
- Party: Indian National Congress (1960-1996, 1998-2011)
- Other political affiliations: All India Indira Congress (Tiwari) (1996-1998); Independent (1957-1960)
- Spouse: Saroj Kumari
- Children: Ajay Singh; Abhimanyu Singh; Veena Singh
- Education: Allahabad University

Arjun Singh (5 November 1930 – 4 March 2011) was an Indian politician from the Indian National Congress, who served twice as the Chief Minister of Madhya Pradesh in the 1980s. He also served twice as the Union Minister of Human Resource Development, in the Manmohan Singh and P. V. Narasimha Rao ministries.

The surrender of dacoit Phoolan Devi in 1983 was a significant event during his tenure as Chief Minister of Madhya Pradesh, reflecting efforts by his government to restore law and order, particularly in the Chambal region, while also dealing with the underlying socio-economic issues.

He is widely remembered for introducing 27% reservation for Other Backward Classes in educational institutions including All India Institute of Medical Sciences (AIIMS), Indian Institutes of Technology (IITs), National Institutes of Technology (NITs), Indian Institutes of Management (IIMs), Indian Institute of Science (IISc), with the passage of Ninety-third Constitutional Amendment and Central Educational Institutions(CEIs) (Reservation in Admission) Act, 2006. This led to anti-reservation protests against this act. The protests ended after the Supreme Court of India upheld the reservations in higher education.

== Early life ==
Arjun Singh was born on 5 November 1930 into a Rajput family as the son of Shiv Bahadur Singh, a jagirdar and the 26th Rao of Churhat thikana, and an INC politician. He received his Bachelor of Laws from Rewa Darbar College, where he was the student union president in 1953.

== Career ==
Arjun Singh addressing inaugural function of National Science Centre, New Delhi on 9 January 1992

Arjun Singh was first elected to the Madhya Pradesh Legislative Assembly in 1957 from Majholi as an independent candidate. He joined the Indian National Congress in 1960. He was re-elected from Majholi in 1962 and became a minister in the INC government of Dwarka Prasad Mishra.

In 1967, he lost the election from Churhat due to a fallout with the then chief minister Dwarka Prasad Mishra. However, he won a bypoll the same year from Umaria. He was elected from Sidhi in 1972 and became a minister in the INC government of Prakash Chandra Sethi.

In 1977, he was elected from Churhat and became the Leader of Opposition in the Madhya Pradesh Legislative Assembly. In 1980, when INC achieved a simple majority in the assembly, he won from Churhat and became the Chief Minister of Madhya Pradesh, despite the presence of strong contenders such as Sethi, Vidya Charan Shukla and Shiv Bhanu Singh Solanki.

As chief minister, Singh implemented several populist initiatives, including the regularisation of slums and providing free electricity connections to residents. During his time in office, the dacoit Phoolan Devi surrendered. His five-year tenure was also notably marked by the Bhopal Gas Tragedy.

He led the INC to victory in 1985, yet again winning from Churhat, but was forced to resign as Chief Minister after just one day due to differences with Sriniwas Tiwari. Motilal Vora succeeded him as Chief Minister. Dwarika Prasad Dubey succeeded his organizational position becoming the President of Rampur Congress Committee (MP).

His differences with Sriniwas Tiwari were so extreme that he had to cut the assembly ticket of Dwarika Prasad Dubey (Nausa), who was the Sidhi associate of Sriniwas Tiwari in 2003 MP assembly elections to control the rising power of Nausa. However this decision is considered as one of the Worst decision made by him as Dwarika Prasad Dubey was known to be a political beast of Madhya Pradesh due to his immense fan following and this even led to shake of Churhat Thikana itself. However, things went better between Dwarika Dubey (Nausa) and Arjun Singh's son, Ajay Singh ( Rahul bhaiya ) and they got their family seat Churahat back in 2023.

He resigned his Madhya Pradesh assembly seat and was appointed Governor of Punjab in 1985. He worked for the implementation of the Rajiv-Longowal Accord for peace in Punjab. However, after eight months, he resigned as Governor and became Minister of Commerce in the Rajiv Gandhi cabinet. He was elected to the Lok Sabha from South Delhi in a bypoll in 1985, necessitated by the assassination of the sitting MP Lalit Maken. He was appointed First Vice-President of Indian National Congress by Rajiv Gandhi.

In 1986, he resigned the Commerce ministry and was appointed Minister of Communications. He held this post till 1988 when he returned to the Government of Madhya Pradesh and again became Chief Minister of the state. He resigned his Lok Sabha seat and won a bypoll to the Madhya Pradesh Legislative Assembly from Kharsia in 1988. However, he resigned as Chief Minister in 1989 owing to the Churhat lottery scam, and was succeeded by Motilal Vora. He was elected to the Madhya Pradesh assembly from Churhat in 1990 and from Satna in 1991. He resigned his assembly seat and harboured ambitions of becoming Prime Minister after the assassination of Rajiv Gandhi.

However, P. V. Narasimha Rao became Prime Minister and Singh was appointed the Minister of Human Resource Development. He publicly expressed discontent with the Prime Minister Narasimha Rao after the Babri Masjid demolition in 1992. He resigned as Minister of Human Resource Development in 1994.

In 1996, he rebelled against the INC leadership and formed the All India Indira Congress (Tiwari) along with Narayan Dutt Tiwari. However, he lost in 1996 from Satna.

Later, he returned to INC after the emergence of Sonia Gandhi. He lost in 1998 from Hoshangabad.

He was elected to the Rajya Sabha in 2000 from Madhya Pradesh and was re-elected in 2006. He was awarded the Outstanding Parliamentarian Award in 2000. He served as Minister of Human Resource Development from 2004 to 2009 in the Manmohan Singh cabinet.

== Social Justice ==
=== Reservation for Other Backward Class (OBCs) in educational institutions ===
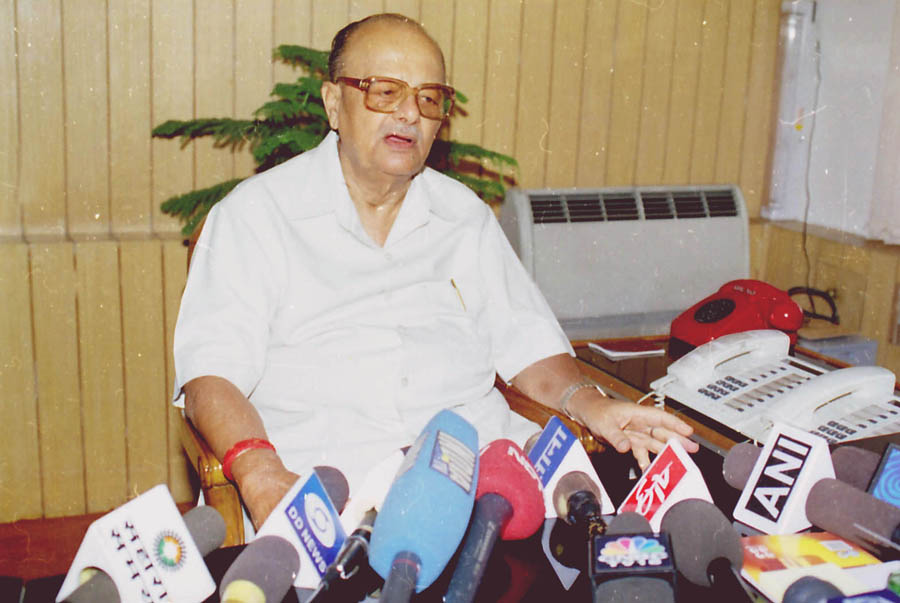
Arjun Singh assumes the charge of Union Minister for Human Resource Development in New Delhi on 24 May 2004

Arjun Singh had immense contributions for social justice in India. He is credited with implementing reservations for Other Backward Classes in higher educational institutions. After the State Assembly elections in Tamil Nadu, Kerala, Puducherry, Assam and West Bengal, Arjun Singh promised to reserve 27% seats for Other Backward Classes in All India Institutes of Medical Sciences, Indian Institutes of Technology, Indian Institutes of Management, and other central universities. The Ninety-third Constitutional Amendment, that was introduced by the First Manmohan Singh ministry, granted a 27% reservation for Other Backward Classes in all Central Government educational institutions.

The 93rd Amendment Act of 2005 to the Indian Constitution added clause (5) in Article 15 which enables the government to make any special provision for the development of any socially and educationally backward classes of people, or scheduled castes or scheduled tribes, with regard to their enrolment in educational institutions, which would include private educational institutions, whether aided or unaided by the government, but apart from minority educational institutions. After the 93rd Amendment Act, the Central Educational Institutions(CEIs) (Reservation in Admission) Act, was enacted by the Union Parliament in the year 2006.

This led to widespread anti-reservation protests where students engaged in street protests across India. Later on, students took legal action against the Act by filing Public Interest Litigation, claiming that it violated the Basic Structure of the Constitution of India. In March 2007, the Supreme Court of India granted an injunction to suspension of OBC reservations.

In April 2008, a 5-member constitutional bench of the Supreme Court, in the Ashoka Kumar Thakur v. Union of India case, upheld the Ninety-third Constitutional Amendment, and reinstated the Act in a judgement delivered by Chief Justice India K. G. Balakrishnan, with Justices Arijit Pasayat, C K Thakker, R V Raveendran and Dalveer Bhandari. OBC reservations were implemented in all central universities and institutions, but the government was required to exclude the creamy layer from the OBC, but not SC/ST.

== Controversies ==
=== Bhopal Incident ===
Arjun Singh was the Chief Minister of Madhya Pradesh when the deadly gas leak from the Union Carbide factory occurred. It is widely alleged that on the fateful night between 2 and 3 December 1984, when the gas leak occurred, Arjun Singh fled to his Kerwa Dam Palace (outside Bhopal) to save himself from deadly effects of leaked gas and was not available to manage the crisis or lead the administration.

Subsequently, the Arjun Singh government's mishandling was criticised by the court in the verdict on the Bhopal disaster as pronounced by the Chief Judicial Magistrate, Bhopal on 7 June 2010. The media raised serious questions about his role in the release of Warren Anderson.

In particular, the pilot of the aircraft in which Warren Anderson flew out of India after the gas leak, has recorded that the final sanction to permit the flight came from Arjun Singh's office.

=== Churhat Lottery case and Kerwa Dam palace ===
While Chief Minister of Madhya Pradesh, Singh was involved in the scandal known as the Churhat Lottery case. The Churhat Children Welfare Society was floated in 1982 by relatives of Singh, and permitted to raise funds via lottery, and also given tax relief as a charity. However, there were widespread allegations that substantial sums of money were siphoned off from donations and used to construct the lavish Kerwa Dam Palace near Bhopal. The donations to the society included a Rs 150,000 donation from Union Carbide, whose chief Warren Anderson was permitted to leave the country after the gas leak, allegedly by Arjun Singh's office.

At a public litigation hearing, the Madhya Pradesh High Court observed that "Arjun Singh owed an explanation to the nation about the costs and sources of construction of the palatial mansion in Bhopal". While Singh had claimed the value of the palace was Rs 1.8 million, the IT Department estimated the cost at above Rs one crore. However, a one-judge commission investigating the scandal gave a clean chit to Arjun Singh. The case was re-opened however, after the Jain Hawala case, and Singh was asked to submit fresh re-estimates of the palace cost. In court, the case was argued by Kapil Sibal and the order for re-examination was squashed on the grounds that it had been issued in a haste and "had not applied his mind".

=== Other controversies ===
After the Mumbai train bombings of 2006, he reportedly quoted at a Cabinet meeting the statements of a former judge of the Maharashtra High Court that an earlier attempt on the headquarters of the Hindu revivalist Rashtriya Swayamsevak Sangh in Nagpur had been a plot set into motion by the Sangh itself. This followed his denouncement of the Ekal Vidyalayas, one-teacher schools run for the benefit of the tribals of India by the Vishwa Hindu Parishad, as communal.

A case under the Anti-Dowry Act was registered against Arjun Singh in 2007. The then Uttar Pradesh government had decided to seek CBI inquiry into dowry harassment case.

Arjun Singh was accused of irregularities and corruption in the grant of "Deemed University" status to private for-profit educational institutions which did not meet requisite educational standards, during his tenure as Minister for Human Resources Development. The Government of India initiated proceedings to repeal the "Deemed University" status of 44 such institutions in January 2010.

== Death ==
Singh died on 4 March 2011, at the age of 80. He had been admitted to Delhi's All India Institute of Medical Sciences with chest pain and neurological problems, and died of a heart attack. He was cremated at his home town of Churhat.

== Family ==
Arjun Singh's son Ajay Singh aka Rahul Bhaiya is an INC politician and former Leader of Opposition in the Madhya Pradesh Legislative Assembly. His grandson is Arunoday Singh, a Bollywood actor.

Another grandson of his, Yuvaraja Aishwarya Singh of Singrauli is married to Devyani Rana, great-granddaughter of Mohan Shamsher Jang Bahadur Rana, the last Shree Teen Maharaja of Nepal. Devyani’s father- His Highness Shree Teen Maharaja Pashupati Shamsher Jang Bahadur Rana is the titular Shree Teen Maharaja of Nepal.

== Positions held ==
- 1957 - 1985 Member, Madhya Pradesh Legislative Assembly
- 1963 - 1967 Minister of State for Agriculture, General Administration Department (GAD) and Information & Public Relations, Government of Madhya Pradesh
- 1967 - Minister of Planning and Development, Government of Madhya Pradesh
- 1972 - 1977 Minister of Education, Government of Madhya Pradesh
- 1977 - 1980 Leader of Opposition, Madhya Pradesh Legislative Assembly
- 1980 - 1985 Chief Minister of Madhya Pradesh
- 1985 - 1985 Governor of Punjab
- 1985 - 1988 Member of Parliament, Lok Sabha
- 1985 - 1986 Minister of Commerce, Government of India
- 1986 - 1988 Minister of Communications, Government of India
- 1988 - 1991 Member, Madhya Pradesh Legislative Assembly
- 1988 - 1989 Chief Minister of Madhya Pradesh
- 1991 - 1996 Member of Parliament, Lok Sabha
- 1991 - 1994 Minister of Human Resource Development, Government of India
- 2000 - 2011 Member of Parliament, Rajya Sabha
- 2000 - 2004 Member, Consultative Committee for the Ministry of Home Affairs
- 2001 - 2004 Member, Committee on Rules
- 2002 - 2004 Chairman, Parliamentary Standing Committee on Purposes Committee
- 2004 - 2009 Minister of Human Resource Development, Government of India

== Elections contested ==
- 1957 - Won from Majholi (IND)
- 1962 - Won from Majholi (INC)
- 1967 - Lost from Churhat (INC)
- 1967 - Won Madhya Pradesh Legislative Assembly bypoll from Umaria (INC)
- 1972 - Won from Sidhi (INC)
- 1977 - Won from Churhat (INC)
- 1980 - Won from Churhat (INC)
- 1985 - Won from Churhat (INC)
- 1985 - Won Lok Sabha bypoll from South Delhi (IND)
- 1988 - Won Madhya Pradesh Legislative Assembly bypoll from Kharsia (INC)
- 1990 - Won from Churhat (INC)
- 1991 - Won from Satna (INC)
- 1996 - Lost from Satna (AIICT)
- 1998 - Lost from Hoshangabad (INC)
- 2000 - Won Rajya Sabha election from Madhya Pradesh (INC)
- 2006 - Won Rajya Sabha election from Madhya Pradesh (INC)

== See also ==
- 2006 Indian anti-reservation protests
- Reservation in India
- Forward caste

Preceded by Murli Manohar Joshi	Minister of Human Resource Development, Government of India; 2004–2009	Succeeded by Kapil Sibal
Preceded by Rajmangal Pandey	Minister of Human Resource Development, Government of India; 1991–1994	Succeeded by Pamulaparthi Venkata Narasimha Rao
Preceded by Motilal Vora	Chief Minister of Madhya Pradesh; 1988–1989	Succeeded by Motilal Vora
Preceded by Ram Niwas Mirdha	Minister of Communications, Government of India; 1986–1988	Succeeded by Vasant Sathe
Preceded by Vishwanath Pratap Singh	Minister of Commerce, Government of India; 1985–1986	Succeeded by Punjala Shiv Shankar
Preceded by Kershasp Tehmurasp Satarawala	Governor of Punjab; 1985–1985	Succeeded by Hokishe Sema
Preceded by President's rule	Chief Minister of Madhya Pradesh; 1980–1985	Succeeded by Motilal Vora
