= Vishwamitra Pathak =

Indian politician

Member of Madhya Pradesh Legislative Assembly
- Incumbent
- Assumed office (2008-2013), (2023-Present)
- Preceded by: Kamleshwar Patel
- Constituency: Sihawal

Personal details
- Party: Bharatiya Janata Party
- Profession: Politician

Vishwamitra Pathak is an Indian politician from Madhya Pradesh. He is a two time elected Member of the Madhya Pradesh Legislative Assembly from 2008 and 2023, representing Sihawal Assembly constituency as a Member of the Bharatiya Janata Party.

== Political career ==
Pathak began his political journey as a member of the Indian National Congress, where he was an active worker until 2008. Prior to the 2008 Madhya Pradesh Legislative Assembly election, he joined the Bharatiya Janata Party (BJP). In the 2008 Madhya Pradesh Legislative Assembly election, Pathak was nominated by the Bharatiya Janata Party to contest from the Sihawal Assembly Constituency. He ran against the Indian National Congress candidate, Indrajeet Kumar, and won with a margin of 2,468 votes, securing a total of 37,083 votes to Kumar's 34,615.

In the 2013 Madhya Pradesh Assembly election, Pathak again received the BJP ticket for the Sihawal constituency. This time, he faced Kamaleshwar Patel, the son of his previous opponent Indrajeet Kumar, representing the INC. Patel won the election with a significant margin of 32,556 votes, receiving 72,928 votes to Pathak's 40,372.

For the 2018 Madhya Pradesh Assembly election, Pathak departed from the BJP after not being granted a ticket, choosing instead to contest independently. He ran against Kamaleshwar Patel, the INC candidate, and the new BJP nominee, Shivbahadursingh Chandel. Patel won again, with a margin of 31,506 votes, receiving 63,918 votes to Pathak's 27,121 and Chandel's 32,412.

In the 2023 Madhya Pradesh Assembly election, Pathak rejoined the BJP, which nominated him once more for the Sihawal constituency. He competed again against INC candidate Kamaleshwar Patel and won with a margin of 16,478 votes, securing 87,086 votes to Patel's 70,607.

== See also ==
- List of chief ministers of Madhya Pradesh
- Madhya Pradesh Legislative Assembly
