= Devsar, Madhya Pradesh Assembly constituency =

Constituency of the Madhya Pradesh legislative assembly in India

Coordinates: 24.203°N 82.263°E

Devsar
- Constituency No. 81 for the Madhya Pradesh Legislative Assembly

Constituency details
- Country: India
- Region: Central India
- State: Madhya Pradesh
- District: Singrauli
- Lok Sabha constituency: Sidhi
- Established: 1957
- Reservation: SC

Member of Legislative Assembly
- 16th Madhya Pradesh Legislative Assembly
- Incumbent Rajendra Meshram
- Party: Bharatiya Janata Party
- Elected year: 2023
- Preceded by: Subhash Ram Charitra

Devsar is one of the 230 constituencies in the Madhya Pradesh Legislative Assembly of Madhya Pradesh a central state of India. Deosar is also part of Sidhi Lok Sabha constituency.

== Members of the Legislative Assembly ==
Election	Name	Party
1957	Bhai Lal	Independent
1962	Laxmi Kant	Indian National Congress
1967	T. Singh	Indian National Congress
1972	Balraj	Indian National Congress
1977	Jagannath Singh	Janata Party
1980	Patiraj Singh	Indian National Congress (Indira)
1985	Annath Singh	Bharatiya Janata Party
1990	Annath Singh	Bharatiya Janata Party
1993	Patiraj Singh	Indian National Congress
1998	Manik Singh	Indian National Congress
2003	Jagannath Singh	Bharatiya Janata Party
2008	Ramcharitra	Bharatiya Janata Party
2013	Rajendra Meshram	Bharatiya Janata Party
2018	Subhash Ram Charitra	Bharatiya Janata Party
2023	Rajendra Meshram	Bharatiya Janata Party

== Election results ==
=== 2023 ===
2018 Madhya Pradesh Legislative Assembly election: Devsar
Party	Candidate	Votes	%	±%
BJP	Rajendra Meshram	88,660	46.07	+8.3
INC	Banshmani Prasad Verma	66,206	34.4	+3.0
BSP	Shiv Shankar Prasad	17,028	8.85	+0.22
AAP	Ratibhan Prasad	4,423	2.3	+0.76
GGP	Lalpati Saket	2,991	1.55	−9.38
CPI	Shivkali Saket	2,938	1.53	−0.21
SP	Sushma Prajapati	2,589	1.35	
NOTA	None of the above	3,241	1.68	−1.49
Majority		22,454	11.67	+5.3
Turnout		192,438	79.84	+3.46
BJP gain from		Swing		

=== 2018 ===
2018 Madhya Pradesh Legislative Assembly election: Devsar
Party	Candidate	Votes	%	±%
BJP	Subhash Ram Charitra	63,295	37.77	
INC	Banshmani Prasad Verma	52,617	31.4	
GGP	Surendra Prajapati	18,320	10.93	
BSP	Shiv Shankar Prasad	14,464	8.63	
CPI	Shiv Kali Saket	2,913	1.74	
AAP	Subhash Chandra Verma	2,585	1.54	
Bhartiya Shakti Chetna Party	Ad. Shyamlal Saket	2,134	1.27	
Peoples Party of India (Democratic)	Janardan Prasad Prajapti	2,108	1.26	
Republican Party of India (Athwale)	Ramkripal Basor	1,603	0.96	
NOTA	None of the above	5,307	3.17	
Majority		10,678	6.37	
Turnout		167,596	76.38	

== See also ==
- Deosar
- Singrauli district
- List of constituencies of Madhya Pradesh Legislative Assembly
