= Chitrangi Assembly constituency =

Constituency of the Madhya Pradesh legislative assembly in India

Coordinates: 24.47°N 82.54°E

Chitrangi
- Constituency No. 79 for the Madhya Pradesh Legislative Assembly

Constituency details
- Country: India
- Region: Central India
- State: Madhya Pradesh
- District: Singrauli
- Lok Sabha constituency: Sidhi
- Established: 2008
- Reservation: ST
- Elected year: Radha Ravindra Singh
- Preceded by: Amar Singh

Chitrangi is one of the 230 Vidhan Sabha (Legislative Assembly) constituencies of Madhya Pradesh state in central India.

It is part of Singrauli district. It is reserved for ST.

== Members of the Legislative Assembly ==
Election	Member	Party
2008	Jagannath Singh	Bharatiya Janata Party
2013	Saraswati Singh	Indian National Congress
2018	Amar Singh	Bharatiya Janata Party
2023	Radha Ravindra Singh	Bharatiya Janata Party

== Election results ==
=== 2023 ===
2023 Madhya Pradesh Legislative Assembly election: Chitrangi
Party	Candidate	Votes	%	±%
BJP	Radha Ravindra Singh	105,410	58.46	+3.23
INC	Manik Singh	45,531	25.25	+7.81
GGP	Shailendra Horil Singh	7,813	4.33	+1.03
AAP	Mahadev Singh	6,230	3.46	+2.55
Bharatiya Shakti Chetna Party	Chh Otelal Singh Paigam	3,327	1.85	
SP	Shrawan Kumar Singh	2,266	1.26	
NOTA	None of the above	3,463	1.92	−1.54
Majority		59,879	33.21	−4.58
Turnout		180,313	71.84	+5.22
BJP gain from INC		Swing		

=== 2018 ===
2018 Madhya Pradesh Legislative Assembly election: Chitrangi
Party	Candidate	Votes	%	±%
BJP	Amar Singh	86,585	55.23	
INC	Saraswati Singh	27,337	17.44	
BSP	Ashok Singh Paigam	17,491	11.16	
GGP	Dal Pratap Singh Poya	5,169	3.3	
SS	Dhanashah Baiga	2,387	1.52	
Independent	Ramdhani	2,081	1.33	
Bhartiya Shakti Chetna Party	Surya Kamal	1,953	1.25	
Peoples Party of India (Democratic)	Sanjeev Kumar Panika	1,739	1.11	
AAP	Avadhesh	1,424	0.91	
NOTA	None of the above	5,420	3.46	
Majority		59,248	37.79	
Turnout		156,769	66.62	
BJP gain from INC		Swing		

=== 2013 ===
M. P. Legislative Assembly Election, 2013: Chitrangi
Party	Candidate	Votes	%	±%
INC	Saraswati Singh	57,466	40.99	
BJP	Jagannath Singh	47621	33.97	
BSP	Chetmani Singh Poyam	14066	10.03	N/A
GGP	Rajaram Singh Poya	3866	2.76	N/A
BSCP	Chhotelal Singh Paigam	1385	1.00	
Independent	Yagya Narayan	2167	1.55	
Independent	Dhanshah Baiga	1971	1.41	
Independent	Sheshman Kol	1937	1.38	
SP	Roopshah Singh Paigam	1691	1.21	
NPEP	Nandgopal Kol	1343	0.96	
NOTA	None of the Above	4392	3.13	
Majority				
Turnout		140197	65.91	
Swing to INC from BJP		Swing		

== See also ==
- Chitrangi
