= Lohra, Bihar =

- Village
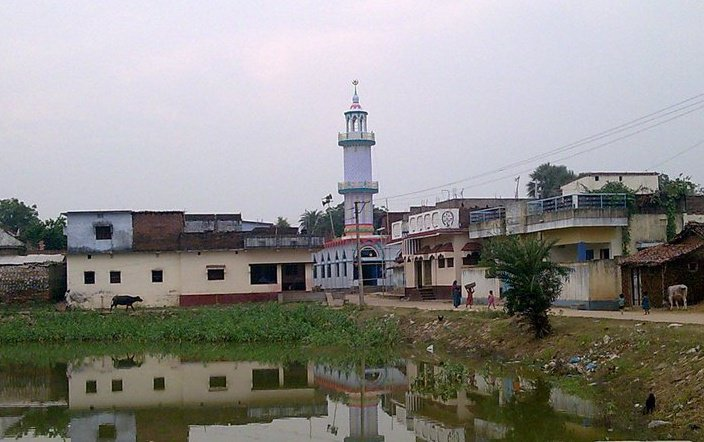

- Location in Bihar, India Lohra, Bihar (India)
- Coordinates: 24.936°N 86.177°E
- Country: India
- State: Bihar
- District: Jamui district
- Elevation: 78 m (256 ft)

Population (2010)
  - Total: 4,900

Languages
  - Official: Maithili, Hindi
- Time zone: UTC+5:30 (IST)
- PIN: 811307
- ISO 3166 code: IN-BR

Lohra Village Jamui district, state of Bihar in eastern India.

== Geography ==
It is located 5 km from Jamui district, in Bihar. and It is 160 km from Patna. the capital of Bihar state. It has a population of about 4899 persons living in around 749 households.the land of Lohra is very fertile. Alluvial Soil formation which is mostly deposited by several lake/pond and nearest river of this area.

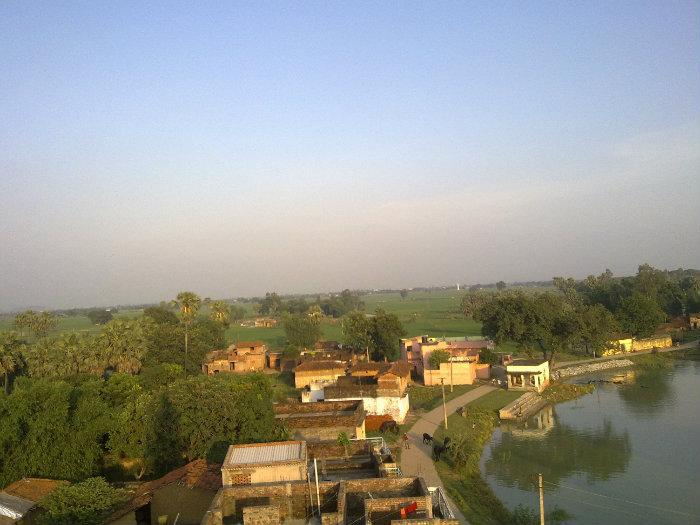
A sky view of Lohra

It's very close to the Jamui, that well connected to all of India through roads and the main Delhi-Howrah rail line is only 7 kilometres away at Mallepur (the Mallepur railway station is also known as the Jamui railway station). The JayaPrakash Narayan International Airport in Patna is about 161 kilometres away and the Gaya International Airport is only 131 kilometres away.

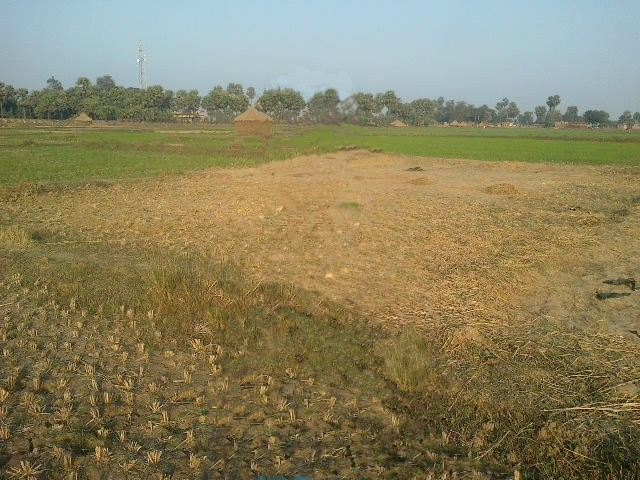
Lohra

Situated along the Bihar-Jharkhand border, Jamui is dotted with hills and the small retreat town of Simultala falls within the Jhajha block, on the main Delhi-Howrah rail line.

== Economy ==
The literacy rate of the village is 75%, which is a higher than the national average of 59.5%: the 90% of Muslims population are NRI's or working in abroad, prime economy of The village holding from abroad and as well as agriculture. the village supplies agricultural products like rice, onions, potatoes, mustard seed and other vegetables to neighboring district and states.

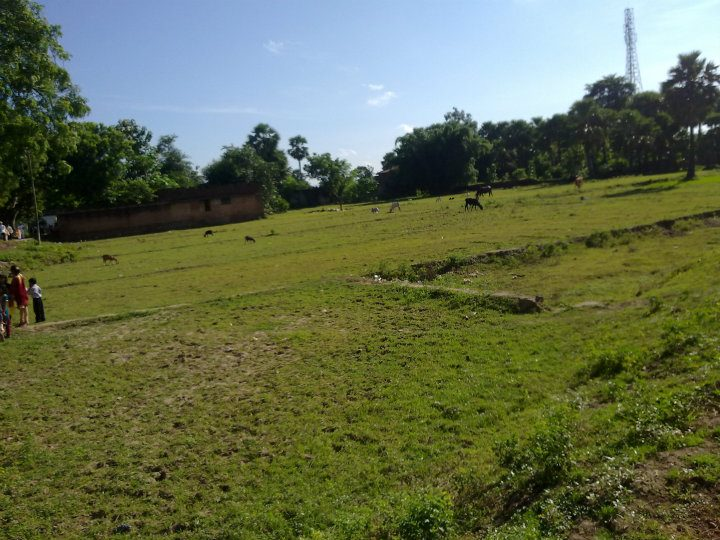
cold

== Transport ==
=== Roadways and railways ===
The Village is well connected by road to major cities like Patna, Kolkata, Nawada, Bihar Sharif, Nalanda, BhagalpurMunger, Ranchi, Dhanbad, Gaya, Hazaribag, Jahanabad, Bakhtiyarpur and Barh]. Being the district Jamui is headquarters, there is a regular Rails and bus service to all major hubs in the region.

=== Airport ===
The nearest airport is Patna Airport. Domestic flights to major Indian cities are available from there.
