= Marapa =

Island in Solomon Islands

Marapa is an island in the Guadalcanal Province of Solomon Islands. The estimated terrain elevation above sea level is 80 metres.
