= Bid Duri =

Bid Duri بيدورئ
- Village
- Location within Iran
- Coordinates: 29°13′48″N 57°34′57″E
- Country: Iran
- Province: Kerman
- County: Jiroft
- Bakhsh: Sarduiyeh
- Rural District: Gevar

Population (2006)
  - Total: 40
- Time zone: UTC+3:30 (IRST)
  - Summer (DST): UTC+4:30 (IRDT)

Bid Duri (Persian: بيدورئ, also Romanized as Bīd Dūrī; also known as Beduri, Bīdūrī, and Kahn-e Bīdūrī) is a village in Gevar Rural District, Sarduiyeh District, Jiroft County, Kerman Province, Iran. At the 2006 census, its population was 40, in 8 families.
