= Rajendra Meshram =

Indian politician

Rajendra Meshram (born 1963) is an Indian politician from Madhya Pradesh. He is an MLA from Devsar Assembly constituency, which is reserved for Scheduled Caste community, in Singrauli District. He won the 2023 Madhya Pradesh Legislative Assembly election, representing Bharatiya Janata Party.

== Early life and education ==
Meshram is from Devsar, Singrauli District, Madhya Pradesh. He is the son of Nathulal. He passed Class 12 in 1981 and later did his diploma in pharmacy passing the examination conducted by the Technical Board of Education, Madhya Pradesh, in 1988.

== Career ==
Meshram won from Devsar Assembly constituency in the 2023 Madhya Pradesh Legislative Assembly election representing Bharatiya Janata Party. He polled 88,660 votes and defeated his nearest rival, Banshmani Prasad Verma of the Indian National Congress, by a margin of 22,454 votes. He first became an MLA winning the 2013 Madhya Pradesh Legislative Assembly election representing the Bharatiya Janata Party from Devsar. In 2013, he defeated his nearest rival, Banshmani Prasad Verma, who then contested as an independent candidate, by a margin of 33,214 votes.
