= Sihawal Assembly constituency =

Constituency of the Madhya Pradesh legislative assembly in India

Coordinates: 24.56°N 82.23°E

Sihawal
- Constituency No. 78 for the Madhya Pradesh Legislative Assembly
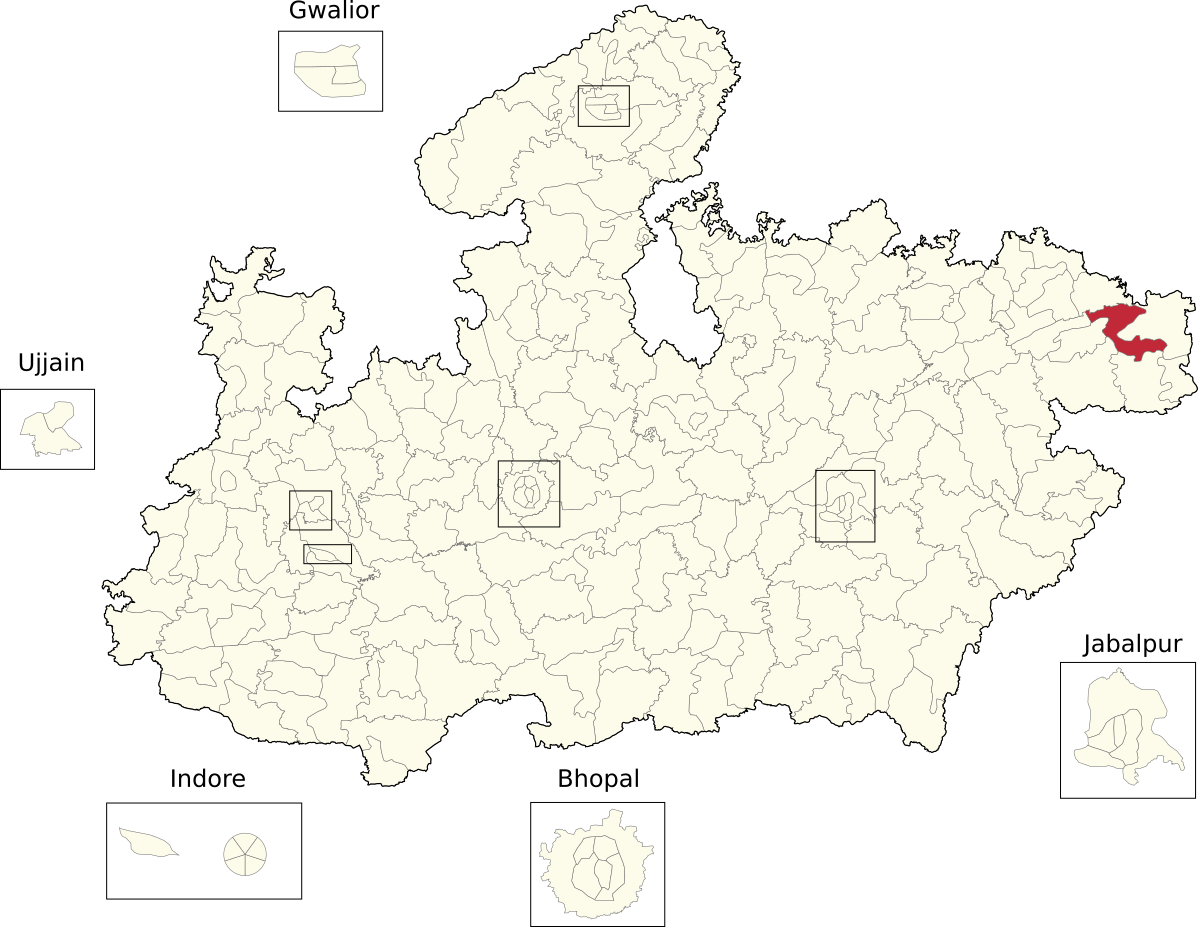

Constituency details
- Country: India
- Region: Central India
- State: Madhya Pradesh
- District: Sidhi
- Lok Sabha constituency: Sidhi
- Established: 2008
- Reservation: None

Member of Legislative Assembly
- 16th Madhya Pradesh Legislative Assembly
- Incumbent Vishwamitra Pathak
- Party: BJP
- Elected year: 2023

Sihawal is one of the 230 Vidhan Sabha (Legislative Assembly) constituencies of Madhya Pradesh state in central India.

It was created after the passing of the Delimitation of Parliamentary and Assembly Constituencies Order, 2008 and is a part of Sidhi District.

== Members of Legislative Assembly ==
Election	Name	Party
2008	Vishwamitra Pathak	Bharatiya Janata Party
2013	Kamleshwar Patel	Indian National Congress
2018	Kamleshwar Patel	Indian National Congress
2023	Vishwamitra Pathak	Bharatiya Janata Party

== Election results ==
=== 2023 ===
2023 Madhya Pradesh Legislative Assembly election: Sihawal
Party	Candidate	Votes	%	±%
BJP	Vishwamitra Pathak	87,085	49.35	+27.65
INC	Kamleshwar Patel	70,607	40.01	−2.78
BSP	Sankalal Kol Alias Rani Verma	9,292	5.27	+0.6
Independent	Bhagwan Das Sahu	2,140	1.21	
NOTA	None of the above	2,176	1.23	−0.43
Majority		16,478	9.34	−11.75
Turnout		176,463	69.69	+3.37
BJP gain from INC		Swing		

=== 2018 ===
2018 Madhya Pradesh Legislative Assembly election: Sihawal
Party	Candidate	Votes	%	±%
INC	Kamleshwar Patel	63,918	42.79	
BJP	Shiva Bahadur Singh Chandel	32,412	21.7	
Independent	Vishwamitra Pathak	27,121	18.16	
BSP	Nisar Alam Fakhruddin (Haji)	6,977	4.67	
SP	Narendra Pratap Singh	3,068	2.05	
BMP	Gaibi Prasad Vishwakarma	2,291	1.53	
AAP	Sukhram Kushwaha	1,915	1.28	
Sapaks Party	Vinod Chaubey	1,841	1.23	
Bhartiya Shakti Chetna Party	Bharat Patel	1,397	0.94	
NOTA	None of the above	2,478	1.66	
Majority		31,506	21.09	
Turnout		149,383	66.32	
INC hold		Swing		

=== 2013 ===
2013 Madhya Pradesh Legislative Assembly election: Sihawal
Party	Candidate	Votes	%	±%
INC	Kamleshwar Patel	72,928	52.64	
BJP	Vishwamitra Pathak	40372	29.14	
BSP	Ghanshyam Pathak	13982	10.09	N/A
BSCP	Bhailal Patel	2652	1.91	
GGP	Mohd. Sharif Khan	1468	1.06	N/A
Independent	Abdul Samad	1385	1.00	
Independent	Svarup Narayan Dwivedi	969	0.70	
SP	Rama Shrawan Dwivedi	658	0.47	
Independent	Vidyacharan R. Shukla	576	0.42	
LJP	Rajkumar Kol	562	0.41	
NOTA	None of the Above	2978	2.15	
Majority				
Turnout		138530	65.25	
Swing to INC from BJP		Swing		

== See also ==
- Sidhi district
- List of constituencies of the Madhya Pradesh Legislative Assembly
