= Pipari =

Coordinates: 27°27′N 83°8′E

Pipari पिपरी
- Village development committee
- Interactive map of Pipari
- Country: Nepal
- Zone: Lumbini Zone
- District: Kapilvastu District

Population (1991)
  - Total: 1,872
- Time zone: UTC+5:45 (Nepal Time)

Pipari is a village development committee in Kapilvastu District (Kapilbastu) in the Lumbini Zone of southern Nepal. At the time of the 1991 Nepal census it had a population of 1872 people living in 303 individual households.
