= Anand Chandra Joshi =

Indian politician

Member of Parliament, Lok Sabha
- In office 1956 – 1967
- Succeeded by: Bhanu Prakash Singh
- Constituency: Sidhi, Madhya Pradesh

Personal details
- Born: 4 May 1908
- Died: 7 September 1973 (aged 65)
- Party: Indian National Congress
- Spouse: Shanta Joshi

Anand Chandra Joshi (1908-1973) was an Indian politician elected to the Lok Sabha, lower house of the Parliament of India from Sidhi, Madhya Pradesh as a member of the Indian National Congress.
