= Majholi =

- city
- Location in Madhya Pradesh, India Majholi (India)
- Coordinates: 23.5°N 79.92°E
- Country: India
- State: Madhya Pradesh
- District: Jabalpur
- Elevation: 385 m (1,263 ft)

Population (2001)
  - Total: 11,308

Languages
  - Official: Hindi
- Time zone: UTC+5:30 (IST)
- ISO 3166 code: IN-MP
- Vehicle registration: MP

Majholi is a growing town and a nagar Parishad in Jabalpur district in the Indian state of Madhya Pradesh.

== Demographics ==
As of 2001 India census, Majholi had a population of 11,308. Males constitute 52% of the population and females 48%. Majholi has an average literacy rate of 65%, higher than the national average of 59.5%: male literacy is 75%, and female literacy is 54%. In Majholi, 15% of the population is under 6 years of age.

== Tourism ==
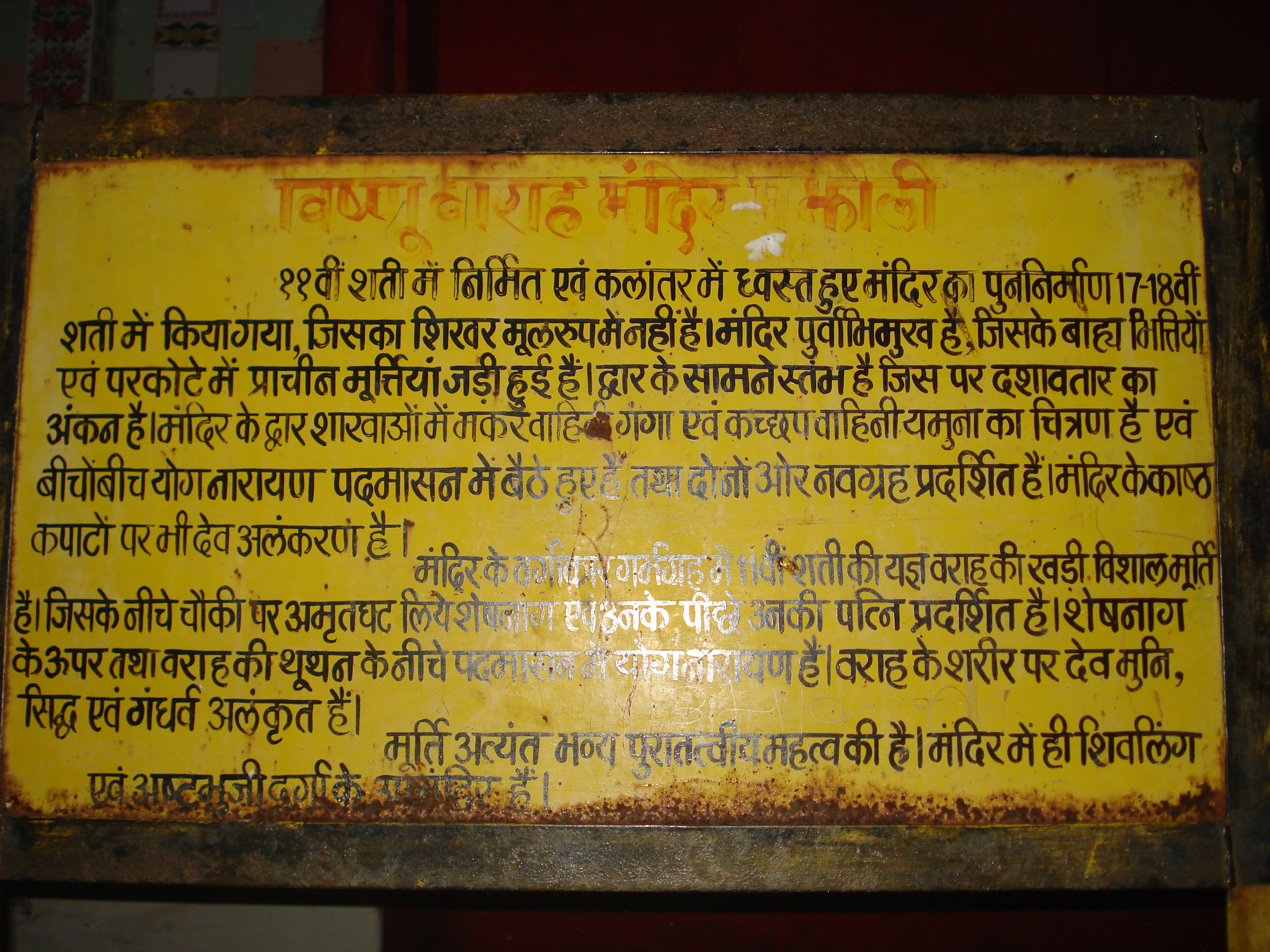
History of Vishnu-Varaha Temple at Majholi

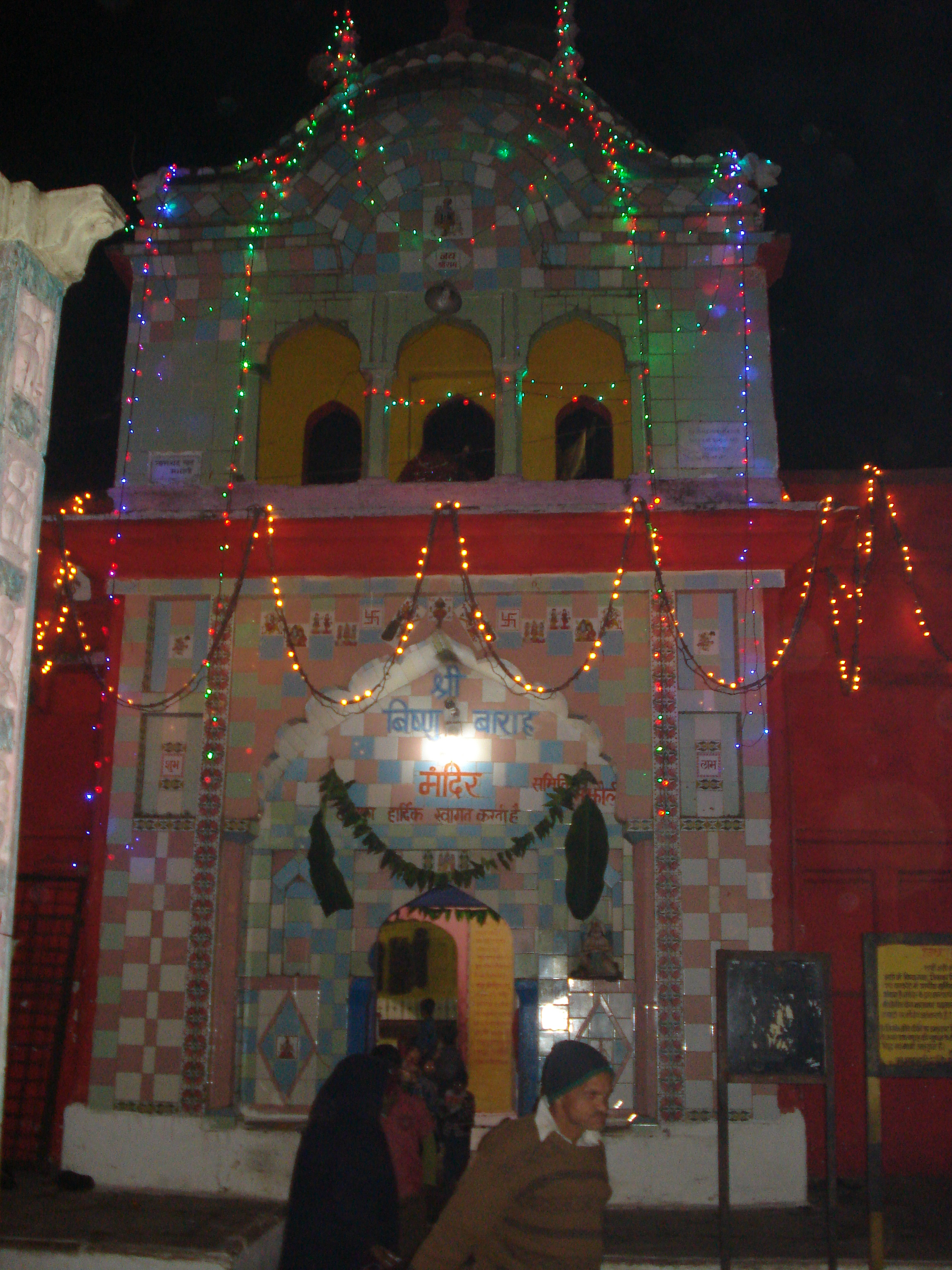
Vishnu-Varaha temple entrance

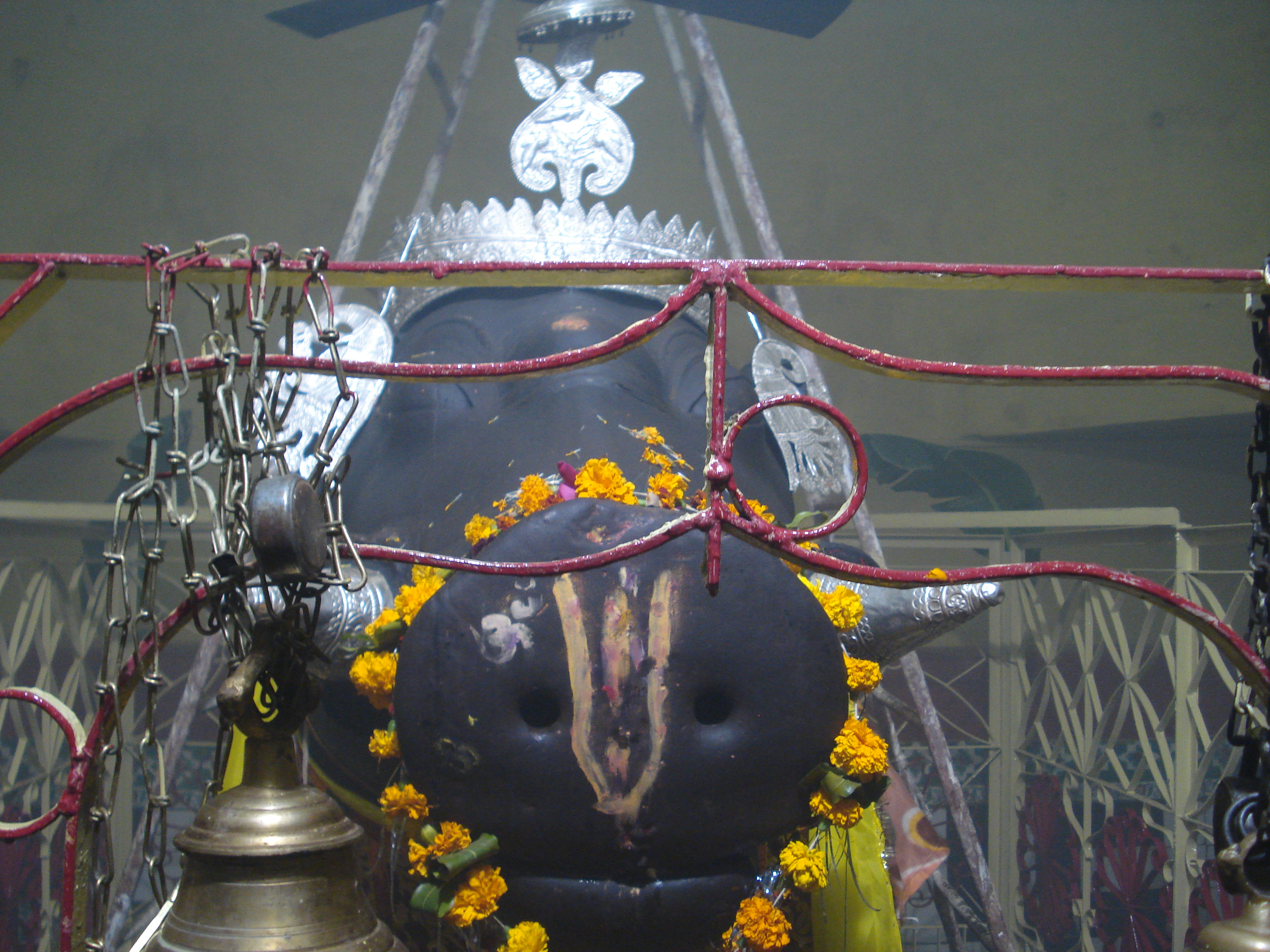
Vishnu-Varaha temple Front

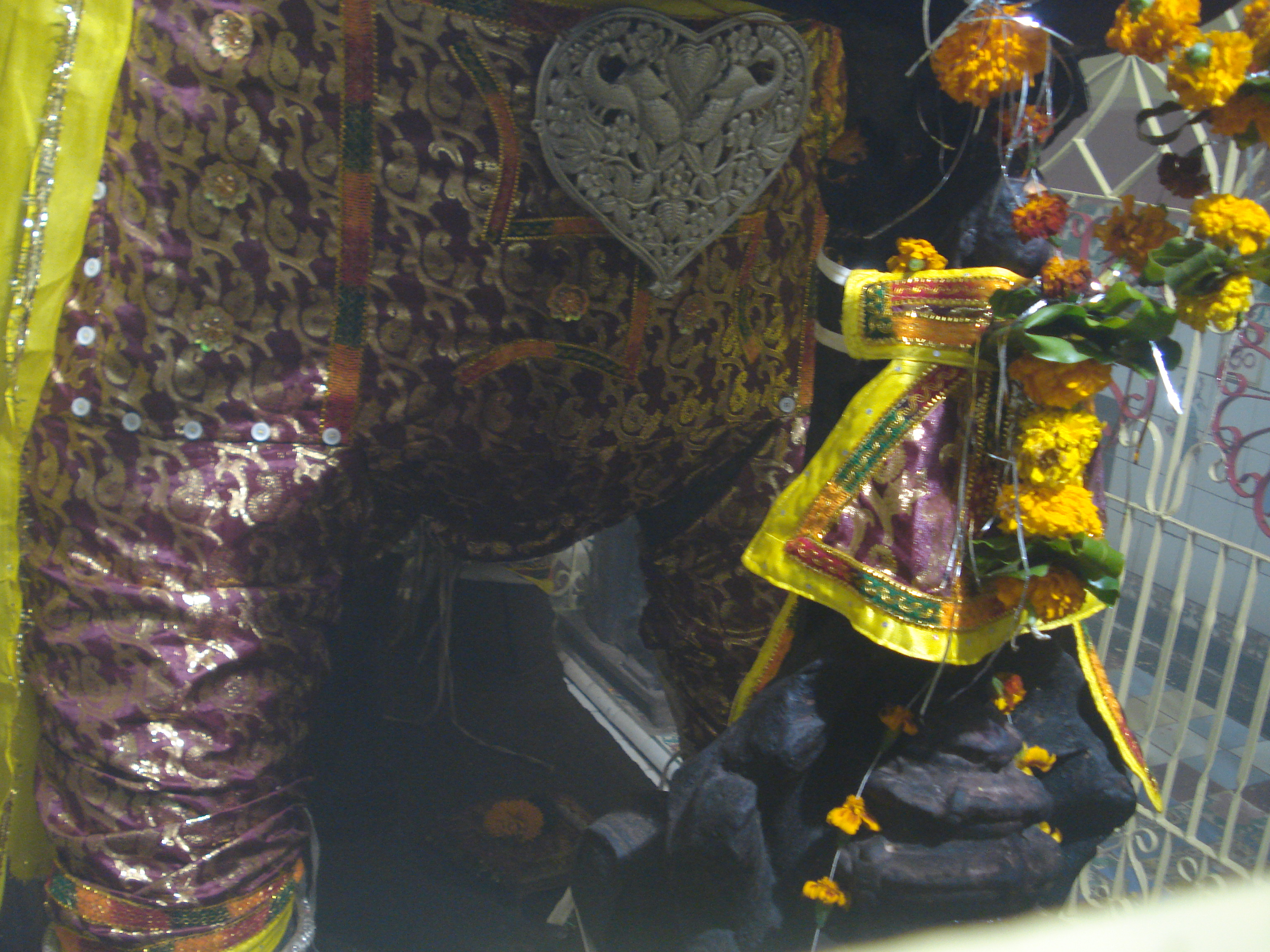
Vishnu-Varaha Adi-Narayan

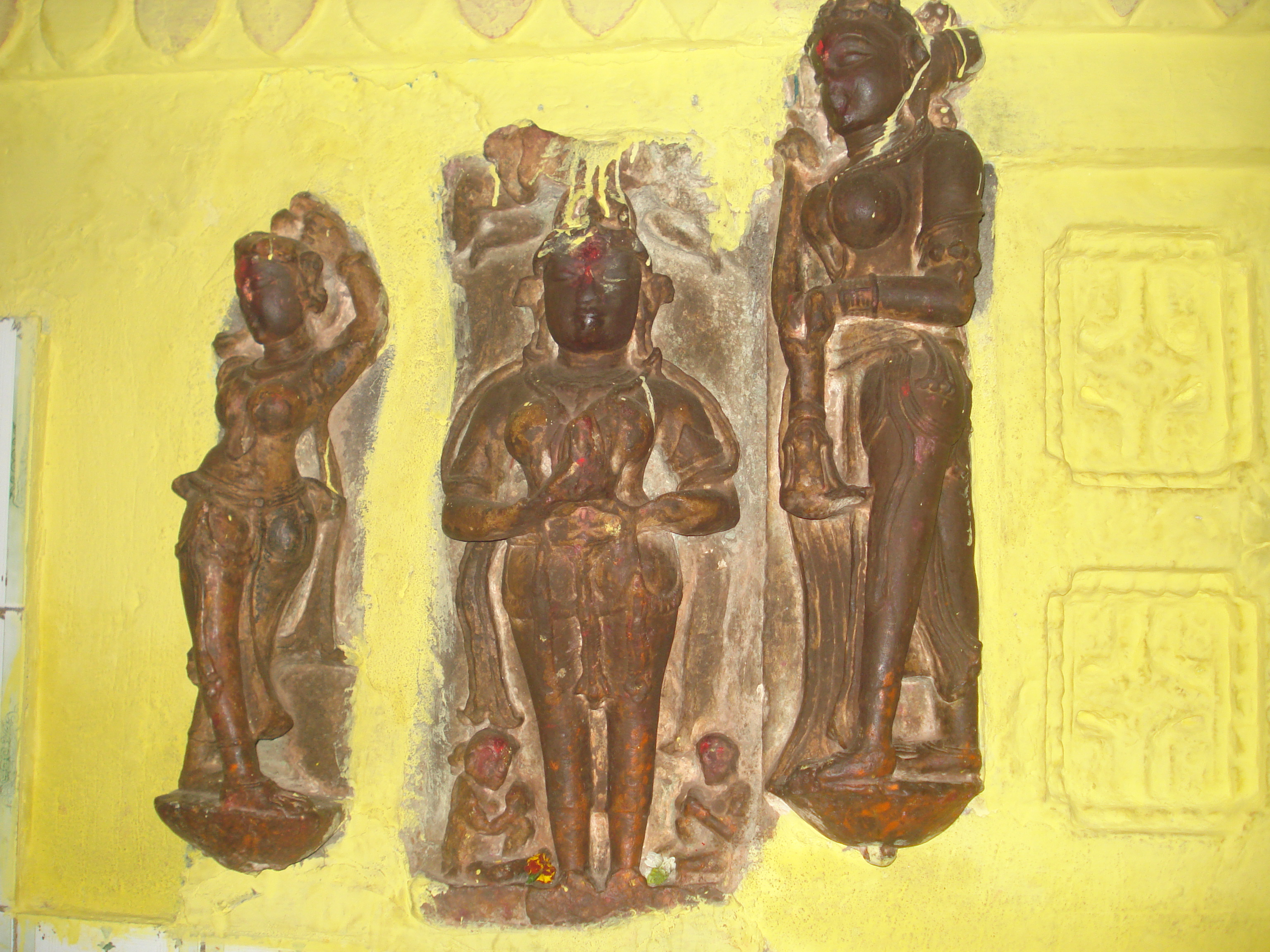
Vishnu-Varaha other statues

A major tourist attraction in Majholi is the Vishnu-Varaha Temple. It is an ancient temple from the 11th century CE, that has an elephant-sized Varaha statue. In front of the Varaha statue, an Adi Narayan statue rests. Behind the Adi Narayan, the serpent Shesha is sitting between front legs of Varaha. Behind Shesha, his wife is depicted. All four vedas are underneath four legs of Varaha.

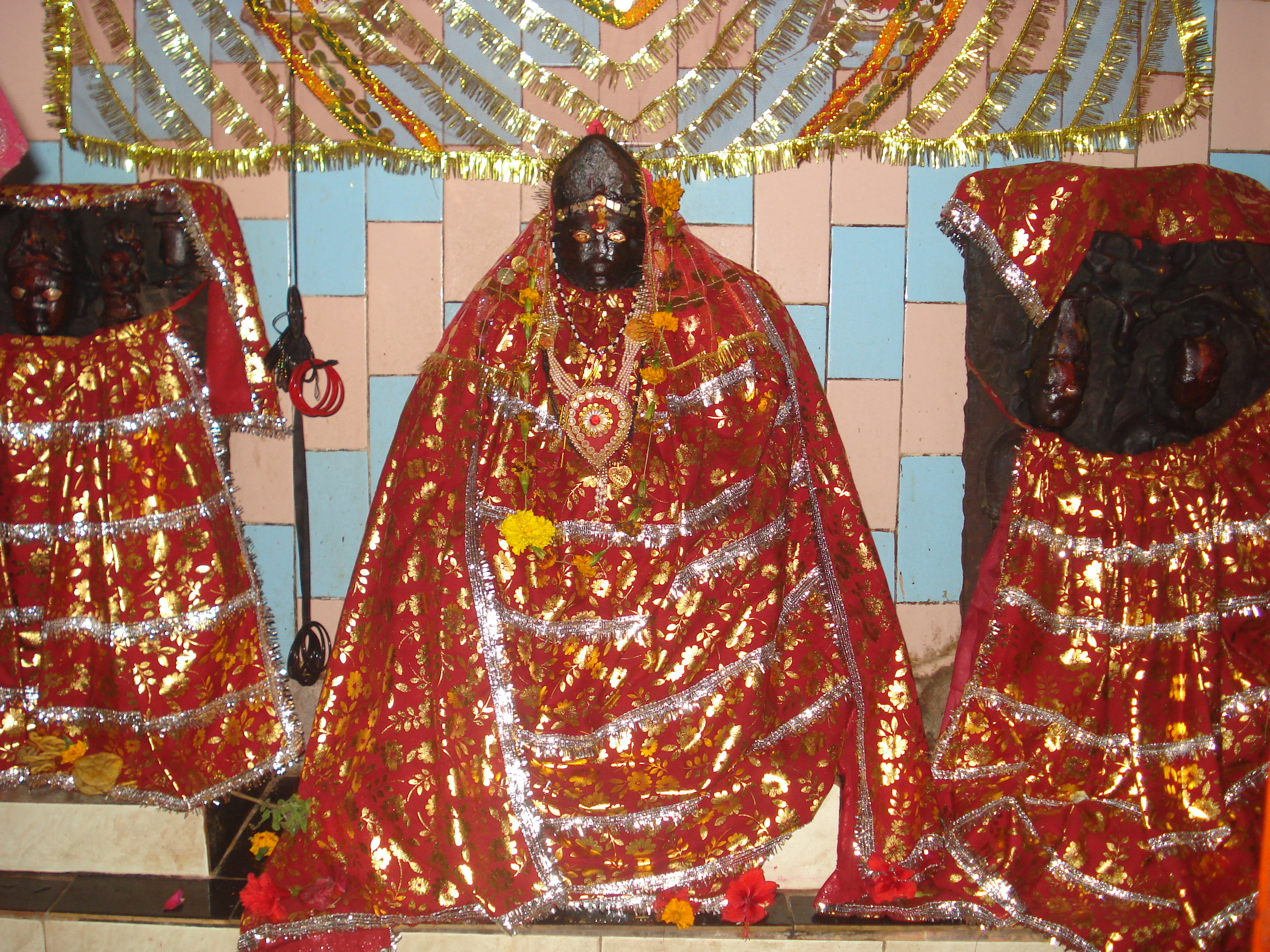
Vishnu-Varaha Durga Statue
