= Airwa =

- town
- Location in Uttar Pradesh, India
- Coordinates: 26°54′N 79°26′E
- Country: India
- State: Uttar Pradesh
- District: Auraiya

Languages
  - Official: Hindi
- Time zone: UTC+5:30 (IST)
- Vehicle registration: UP-
- Coastline: 0 kilometres (0 mi)

Airwa is a town in Auraiya district in the Indian state of Uttar Pradesh.
