= Ajay Arjun Singh =

Indian politician

Ajay Singh 'Rahul Bhaiya'
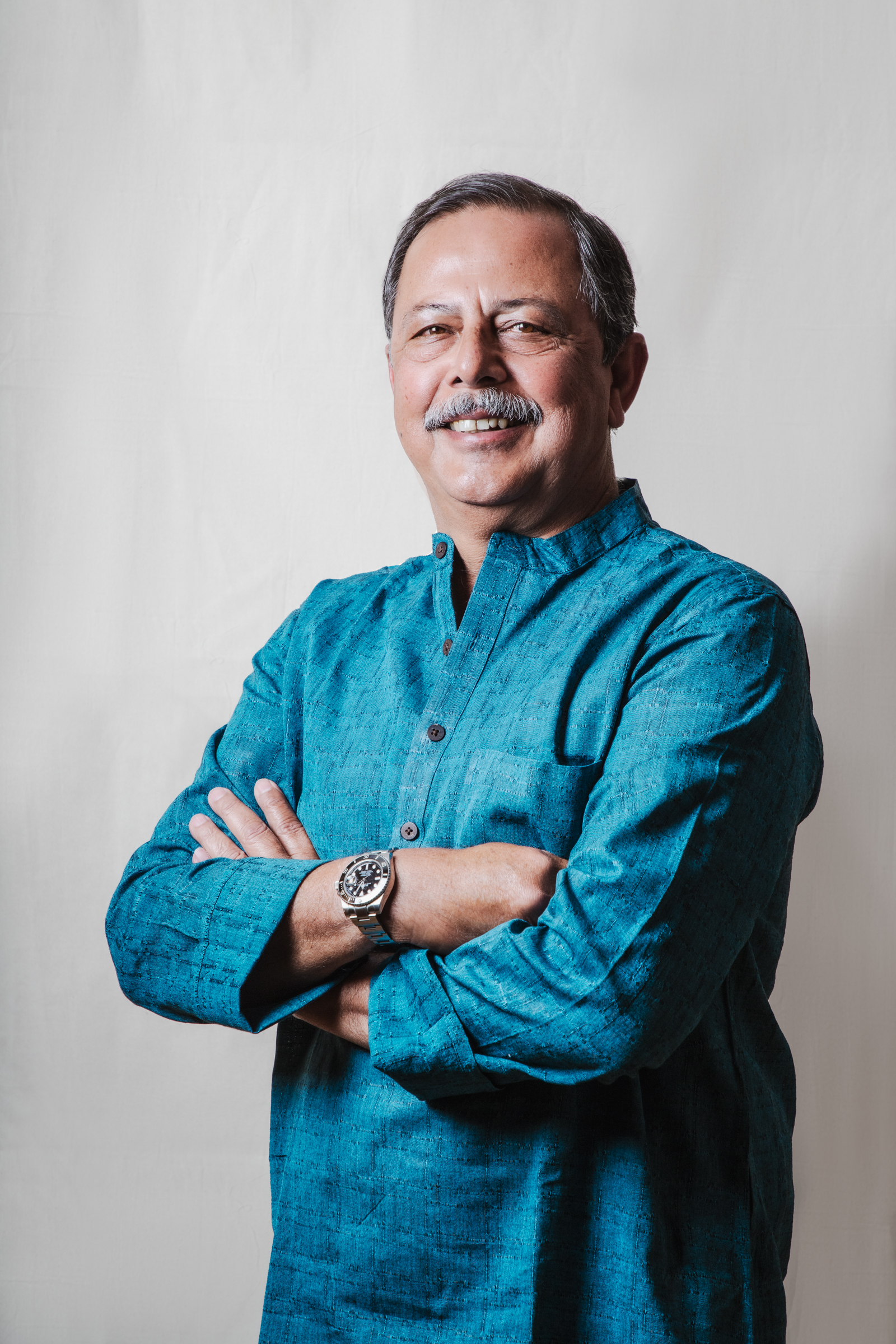

Leader of the Opposition, Madhya Pradesh Legislative Assembly
- In office (2011-2013), (2017 – 2018)
- Preceded by: Jamuna Devi
- Succeeded by: Gopal Bhargava

Member of Madhya Pradesh Legislative Assembly
- Incumbent
- Assumed office (1998-2003), (2003-2008), (2008-2013), (2013-2018), (2023-Present)
- Preceded by: Govind Prasad Mishra
- Constituency: Churhat
- In office (1991 (by-poll) – 1993)
- Preceded by: Arjun Singh
- Succeeded by: Arjun Singh
- In office (1985 (by-poll) – 1990)
- Preceded by: Arjun Singh
- Succeeded by: Arjun Singh

Personal details
- Born: 23 September 1955 (age 71) Prayagraj, Uttar Pradesh, India
- Citizenship: Indian
- Party: Indian National Congress
- Spouse: Suniti Singh
- Children: 3 (including Arunoday Singh)
- Parents: Arjun Singh (father); Saroj Kumari (mother)
- Education: MA in Economics
- Alma mater: Delhi University and Barkatullah University
- Profession: Activist, Politician
- Website: http://ajaysinghrahul.in
- As of 27 July, 2018 Source: []

Ajay Singh, also known as Rahul Bhaiya, is an Indian politician from the state of Madhya Pradesh. He is MLA representing Churhat Assembly constituency.

He previously served as the Leader of the Opposition in the Madhya Pradesh Legislative Assembly and has been elected six times from the Churhat Vidhan Sabha constituency. He also held ministerial positions in Madhya Pradesh under Digvijaya Singh's administration. Rahul Bhaiya has also worked with prominent state level political figures - Shriyut Sriniwas Tiwari, the white tiger of Rewa and the vidhansabha adhyaksh; Digvijaya Singh, former chief minister of MP; Dwarika Dubey Nausa, most powerful person of sidhi 2002 ; Indrajeet Dwivedi, former assembly candidate, etc.

Singh's familial background includes being the son of Arjun Singh, a prominent figure in the Congress party who served as Chief Minister of Madhya Pradesh and as a Union Minister of Human Resource Development.

== Personal life ==
He was born in Allahabad, Uttar Pradesh, and is married to Suniti Singh. Together, they have two daughters and a son, Bollywood actor Arunoday Singh. He is the son of Arjun Singh, who was the Chief Minister of Madhya Pradesh during the Bhopal Gas Tragedy.

== Education ==
Singh did his schooling from Campion School, Bhopal and graduated from the Shri Ram College of Commerce, Delhi University. He completed his M.A. in Economics from Bhopal University and was a gold medalist.

== See also ==
- 1998 Madhya Pradesh Legislative Assembly election
- Madhya Pradesh Congress Committee
