= Jagannath Singh (Madhya Pradesh politician) =

Indian politician

Jagannath Singh (March 7, 1946 in Chitarangi, Sidhi district–August 3, 2015 in Bhopal, Madhya Pradesh) was a member of the 9th Lok Sabha and 12th Lok Sabha of India. He represented the Sidhi constituency of Madhya Pradesh. He was a member of the Bharatiya Janata Party political party.

He served as an MLA four times, twice as a Lok Sabha member from Sidhi constituency and once as a Rajya Sabha member from Madhya Pradesh. He was a member of the Madhya Pradesh Legislative Assembly from the Devsar constituency in 1977. He was the labour minister during 2008 to 2013.
