= Khatkhari =

Khatkhari is a village in Singrauli district of Madhya Pradesh state of India.
