= Kamleshwar Patel =

Indian politician (born 1974)

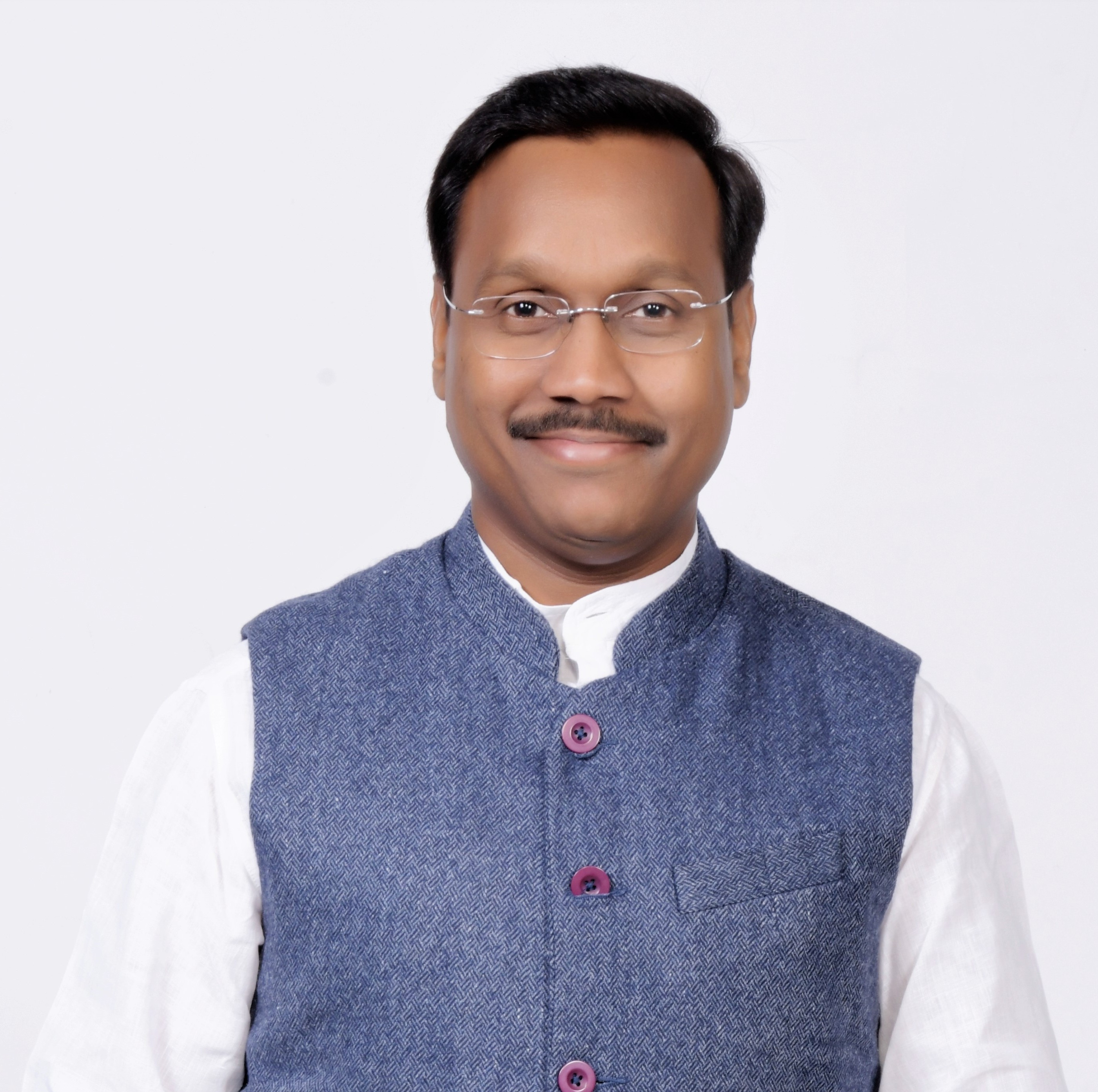

Member of Madhya Pradesh Legislative Assembly
- In office (2013-2018), (2018 – 2023)
- Preceded by: Vishwamitra Pathak
- Succeeded by: Vishwamitra Pathak
- Constituency: Sihawal

Personal details
- Party: Indian National Congress
- Spouse: Preeti Patel
- Children: Eshaa Patel, Eshaan Patel
- Parent: Indrajeet Kumar (father)
- Education: LLB
- Profession: Politician
- Website: kamleshwarpatel.com

Kamleshwar Patel is an Indian politician and a member of the Indian National Congress party.

Kamleshwar Patel was elected from the Sihawal Vidhan Sabha constituency for the first time in the year 2013 and retained the seat in 2018 elections. His father, Indrajeet Kumar, was a member of Indian National Congress party and also cabinet minister in state Govt of Madhya Pradesh. He was elected from the Sihawal Vidhan Sabha constituency for the first time in the year 2013 and retained the seat in 2018 elections but lost the seat in 2023 elections from Bhartiya janta Party Candidate Vishwamitra Pathak. Kamleshwar Patel was minister of Panchayat and Rural Development in Madhya Pradesh government.

== Political career ==
• Cabinet Minister (Panchayat and Rural Development) from December 2018 to March 2020.

• Became an MLA for the first time in 2013 to 2018 & in 2018 was reelected but he lost 2023 elections from BJP candidate Vishwamitra Pathak (Sihawal -Sidhi).

== Legal matters ==
The MP High Court had ordered the police to order an FIR against Kamleshwar Patel for forgery in the medical form filled by him as he was unable to turn up for the court session. The case has been solved.

== See also ==
- Madhya Pradesh Legislative Assembly
- 2013 Madhya Pradesh Legislative Assembly election
- Sihawal (Vidhan Sabha constituency)
- Indian National Congress

== Social Account ==
- Twitter (Official)
