= Govind Prasad Mishra =

Indian politician

- Born: 2 August 1949 (age 76); Kosta Pawai, Sidhi, Madhya Pradesh
- Citizenship: Indian
- Education: B.A., LL.B, D.C.E.
- Alma mater: Awadhesh Pratap Singh University, Samrat Ashok Technological Institute
- Occupation: Politician
- Years active: 1993 – present
- Term: 2009 – present
- Political party: Bharatiya Janata Party
- Board member of: Committee on Coal and Steel
- Spouse: Geeta Mishra
- Parent(s): Shri Hanuman Prasad Mishra (father), Saraswati Devi (mother)

Govind Prasad Mishra (born 2 August 1949 in Kosta Pawai, Sidhi) is an Indian politician, belonging to Bhartiya Janata Party. From 1993–1998, he was a member of the Madhya Pradesh Legislative Assembly. In the 2009 election he was elected to the 15th Lok Sabha from the Sidhi Lok Sabha constituency of Madhya Pradesh.

Mishra is an agriculturist and advocate. He is married to Geeta Mishra and has 4 daughters and 4 sons. His Eldest Son, Anendra Mishra Rajan, has joined Aam Admi Party, in 2023.
