= Majhauli =

Town in Madhya Pradesh, India

- Town
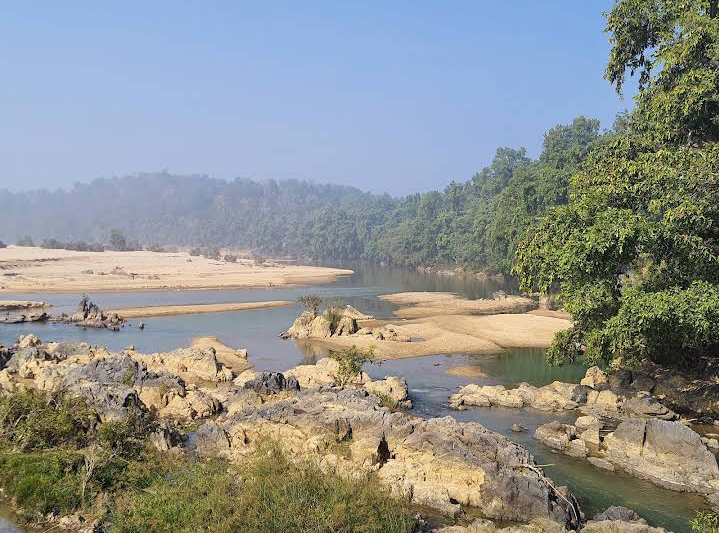
- Parsili Banas River, Majhauli

- Location in Madhya Pradesh, India
- Coordinates: 24.11°N 81.63°E
- Country: India
- State: Madhya Pradesh
- District: Sidhi
- Elevation: 489 m (1,604 ft)

Population (2011)
  - Total: 11,892

Languages
  - Official: Hindi
- Time zone: UTC+5:30 (IST)
- Postal code: 473335
- ISO 3166 code: IN-MP
- Vehicle registration: MP-47

Majhauli is a Town and a Nagar Panchayat in Sidhi District of Madhya Pradesh. Its also a Tehsil Headquarter.

== Geography ==
Majhauli is located on 24.11°N 81.63°E. It has an average elevation of 483 metres (1584 feet).

== Demographics ==
Majhauli Town has a population of 11,892 of which 6,121 are males while 5,771 are females as Census India 2011.

== Places of interest ==
- Parsili Resort, Parsili is situated on the banks of the Banas river in the Majhauli.
- Sanjay Dubri National Park

== Transport ==
Majhauli is well connected with roads. a major road connects it from Sidhi and 50 km away from Sidhi. Madwas is 20 km away from here. Daily bus service available here.
