= White squirrel =

Rare color mutation of an eastern gray squirrel

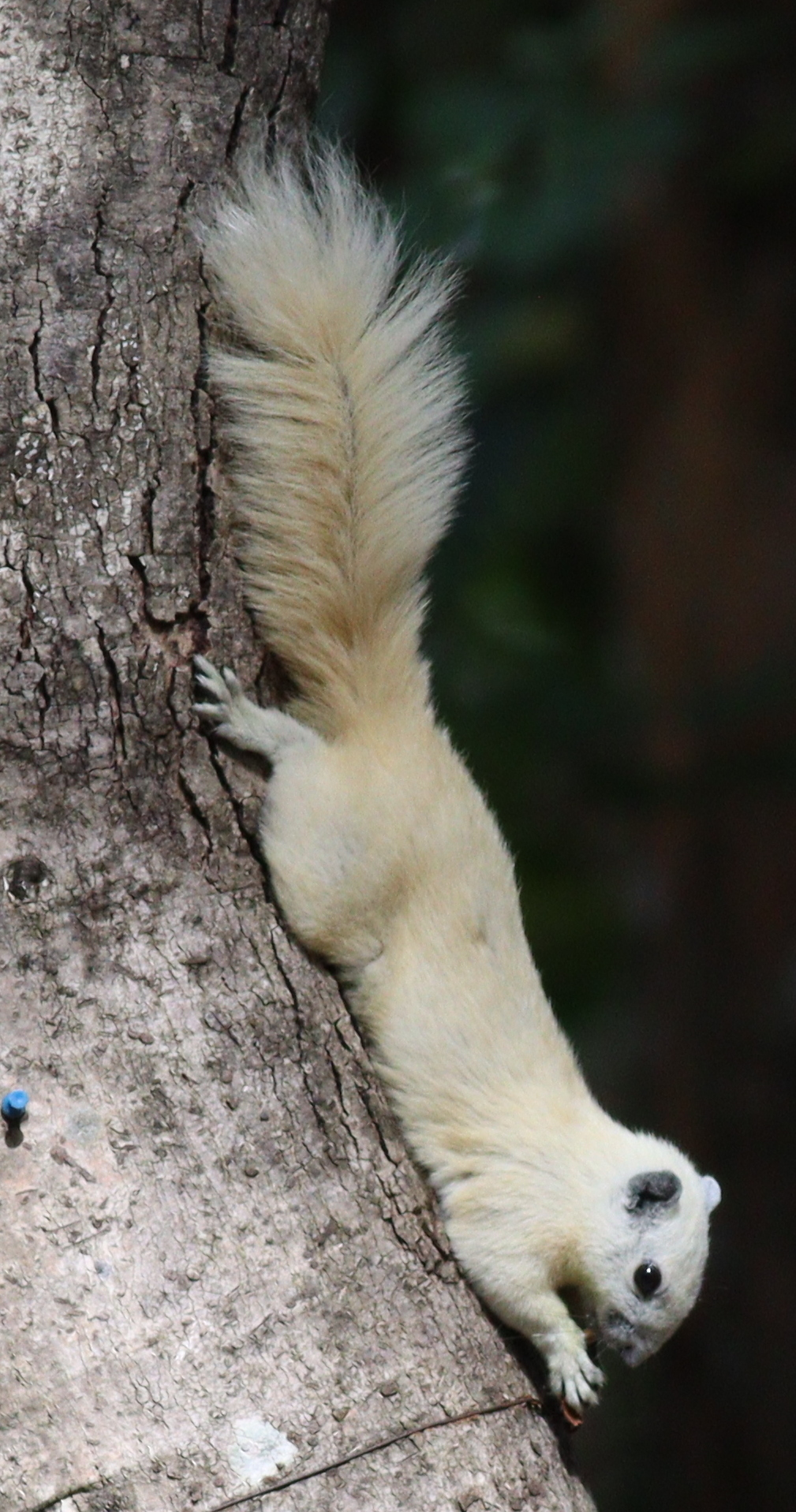
A white morph Finlayson's squirrel

A white squirrel may describe several species of squirrels.

One of the ways these white squirrels affect human society is inspired by the fascination that people seem to have over local populations of white squirrels. A project run by Untamed Science documents user-submitted occurrence of both white squirrels, albinos, and other piebald morphs in the United States.

== Normal genetic color variation ==
White morphs are a common coloration in some populations of Finlayson's squirrel.

Eurasian red squirrels and Japanese squirrels may also rarely exhibit nearly white coloration, although they are not considered true white morphs.

== Coloration caused by pigmentation-loss mutation ==
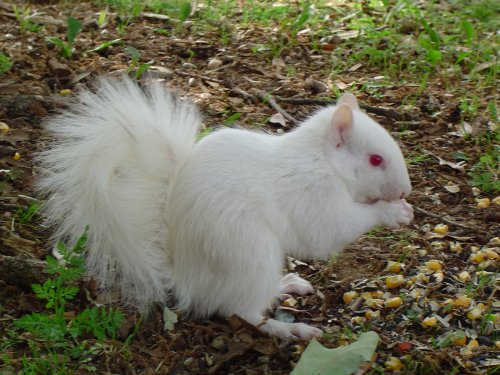
An albino eastern gray squirrel. Note the pink eyes.

In some squirrels, white coloration is caused by pigmentation-loss mutations such as albinism or leucism. Most white squirrels are non-albino eastern gray squirrel that exhibit leucism caused by a recessive gene found in certain populations.

== See also ==
- Black squirrel
- White horse
- White lion
- White panther
- White tiger
