= Naudhia =

- Census town
- Location in Madhya Pradesh, India Naudhia (India)
- Coordinates: 24°12′25″N 82°35′22″E
- Country: India
- State: Madhya Pradesh
- District: Sidhi

Population (2001)
  - Total: 7,143

Languages
  - Official: Hindi
- Time zone: UTC+5:30 (IST)
- ISO 3166 code: IN-MP
- Vehicle registration: MP

Naudhia is a census town in Sidhi district in the Indian state of Madhya Pradesh.

== Demographics ==
As of 2001 India census, Naudhia had a population of 7,143. Males constitute 54% of the population and females 46%. Naudhia has an average literacy rate of 69%, higher than the national average of 59.5%: male literacy is 77%, and female literacy is 59%. In Naudhia, 15% of the population is under 6 years of age.
