= Sanjay National Park =

National park in Madhya Pradesh, India

- Sanjay Dubri Tiger Reserve
- IUCN category II (national park)
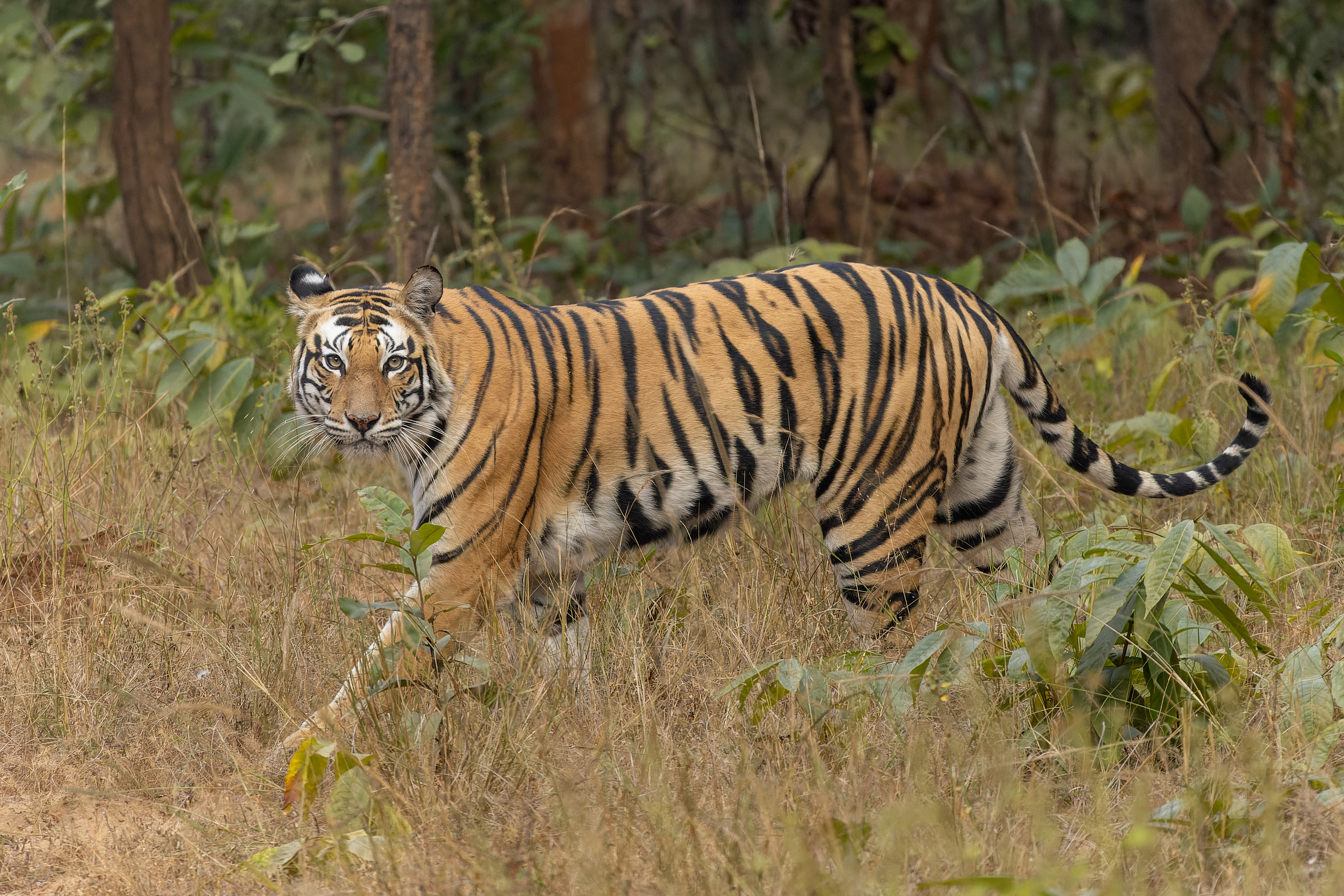
- A Bengal tiger in Sanjay Dubri Tiger Reserve

- Location within Madhya Pradesh Location within India
- Interactive map of Sanjay National Park
- Location: Sidhi district, Madhya Pradesh, India
- Nearest city: Sidhi and Rampur Naikin
- Coordinates: 23°55′N 81°50′E
- Area: 1,674.55 km^{2} (646.55 sq mi)
- Established: 1981 (National Park); 2006 (Tiger Reserve)
- Governing body: Government of India
- Website: sanjaytigerreserve

Sanjay National Park is a national park in Sidhi district of Madhya Pradesh, India. It covers an area of 1,674.55 km^{2} (646.55 sq mi) and is a part of the Sanjay-Dubri Tiger Reserve. It was declared a national park in 1981 and a tiger reserve in 2006.

== Geography ==
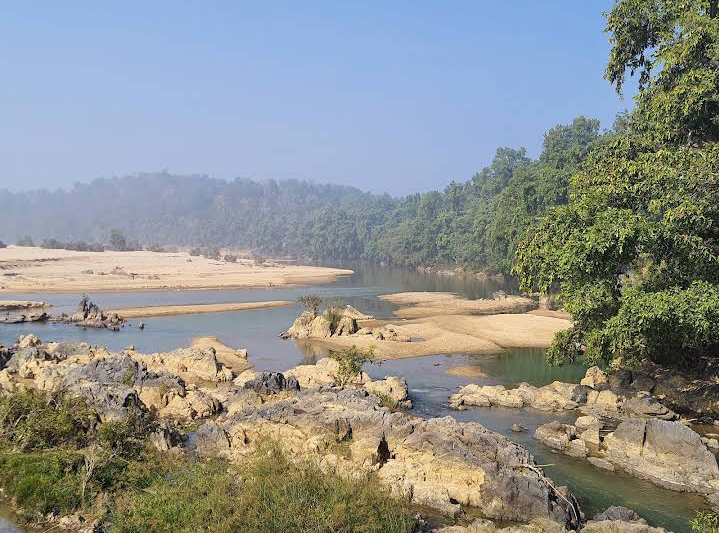
Banas river at Parsili in Sanjay National Park

Location of Sanjay National Park in Madhya Pradesh
M: municipality, NP: National Park

Sanjay National Park is located in the Sidhi district of Madhya Pradesh. It was declared a national park in 1981 and a tiger reserve in 2006. It comprises Sanjay National Park and the Dubri Wildlife Sanctuary, both located in Sidhi District. Sanjay Dubri National Park was named after dubri village. The park is spread over total area of 1,674.55 km^{2} (646.55 sq mi) including 812 km^{2} (314 sq mi) core area and 868 km^{2} (335 sq mi) buffer. It used to be in Madhya Pradesh with 2,300 km^{2} (890 sq mi), before Chhattisgarh was carved out of it in 2000. A large part of this 1,500 km^{2} (580 sq mi) area is now located in Chhattisgarh, which was renamed to Guru Ghasidas National Park by the Government of Chhattisgarh. The Banas river, which joins the Son river, forms the western boundary of the park. The terrain of the park is generally hilly.

== Flora ==
It is located in the Narmada Valley dry deciduous forests ecoregion. The area is well known for its rich biodiversity. It has Sal, bamboo and mixed forests. The trees found in the park are sal, dhawa, tendu, harra, mahua, kusum, shisham, khair, amla and bair.

== Fauna ==
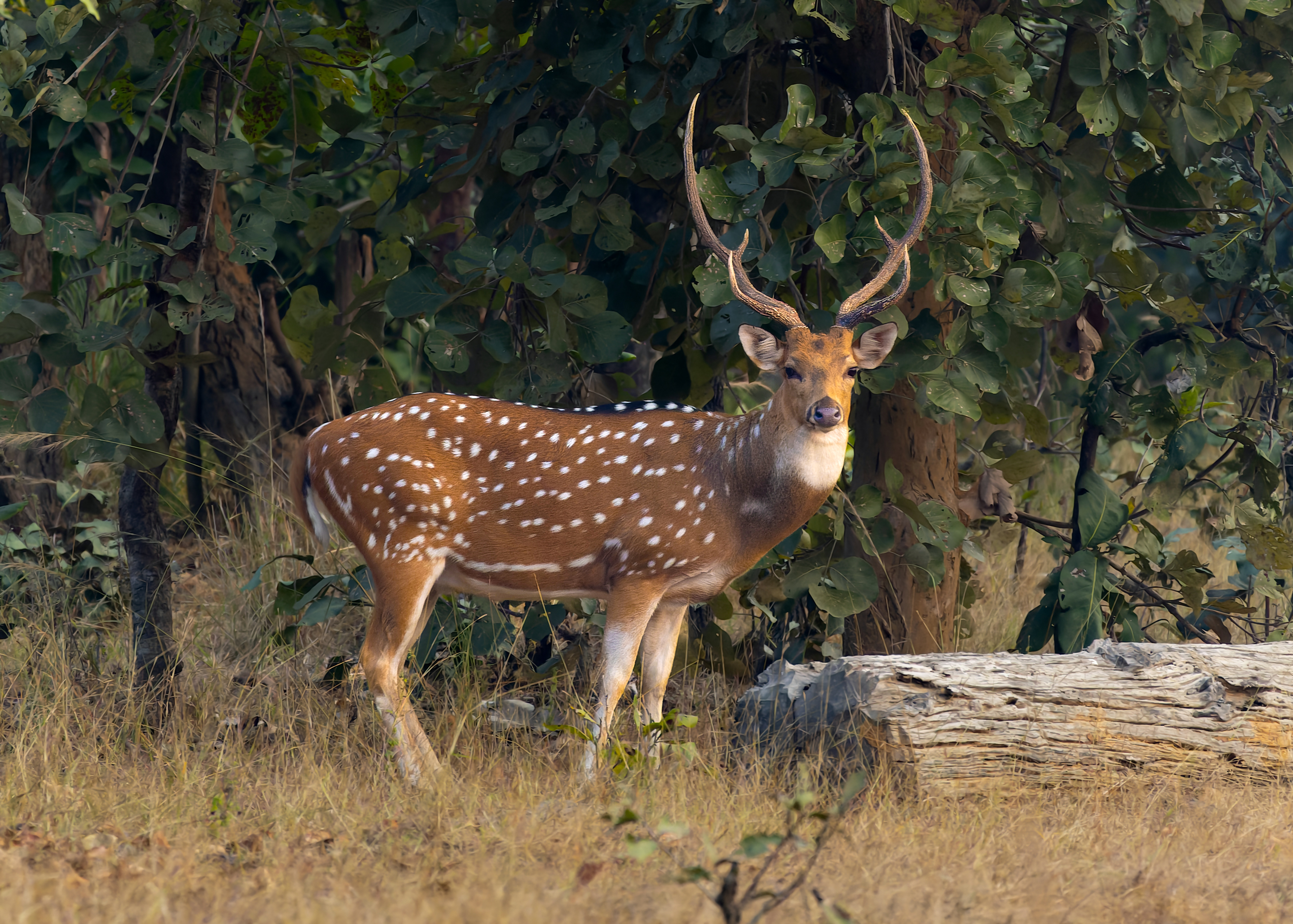
A chital stag

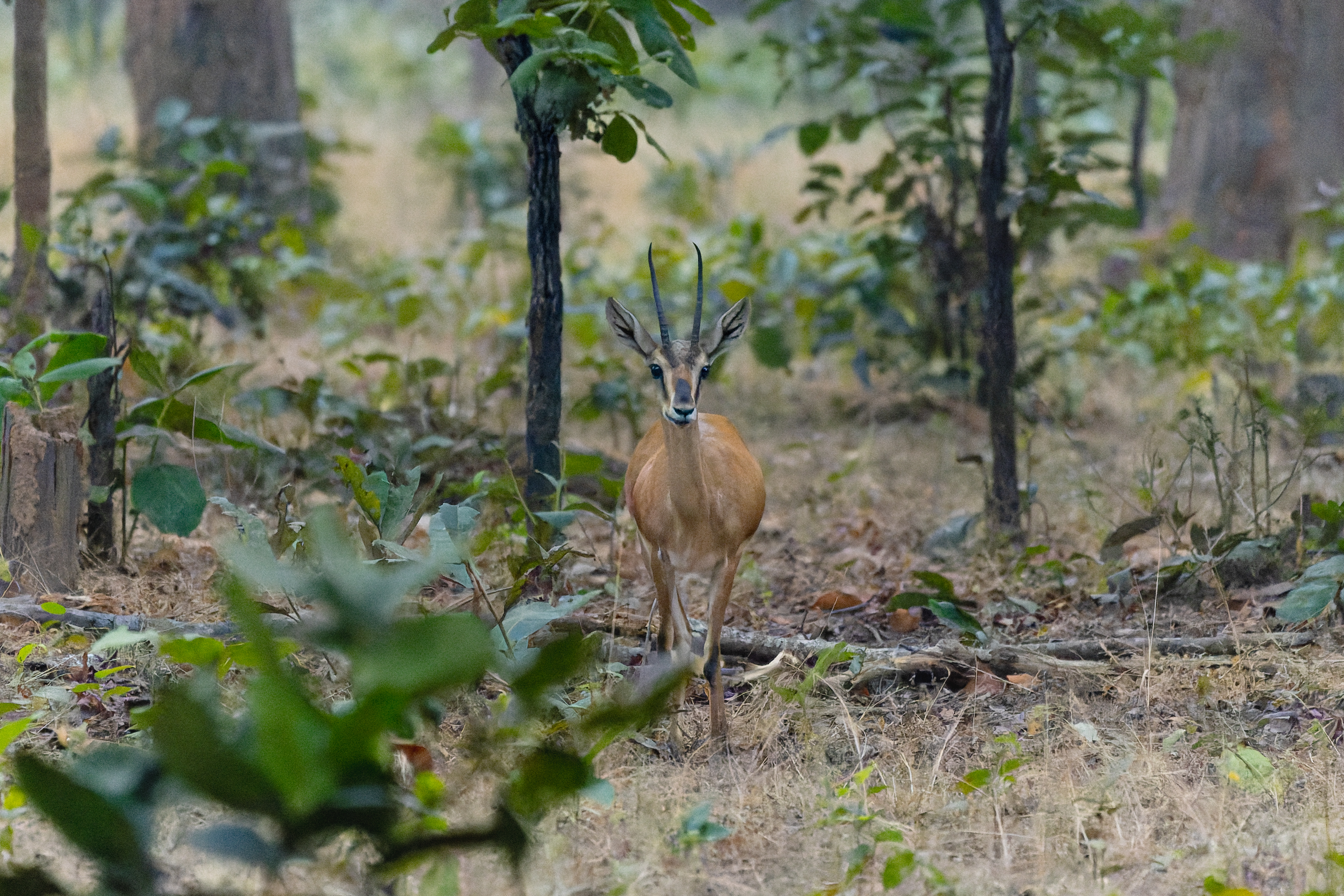
A chinkara

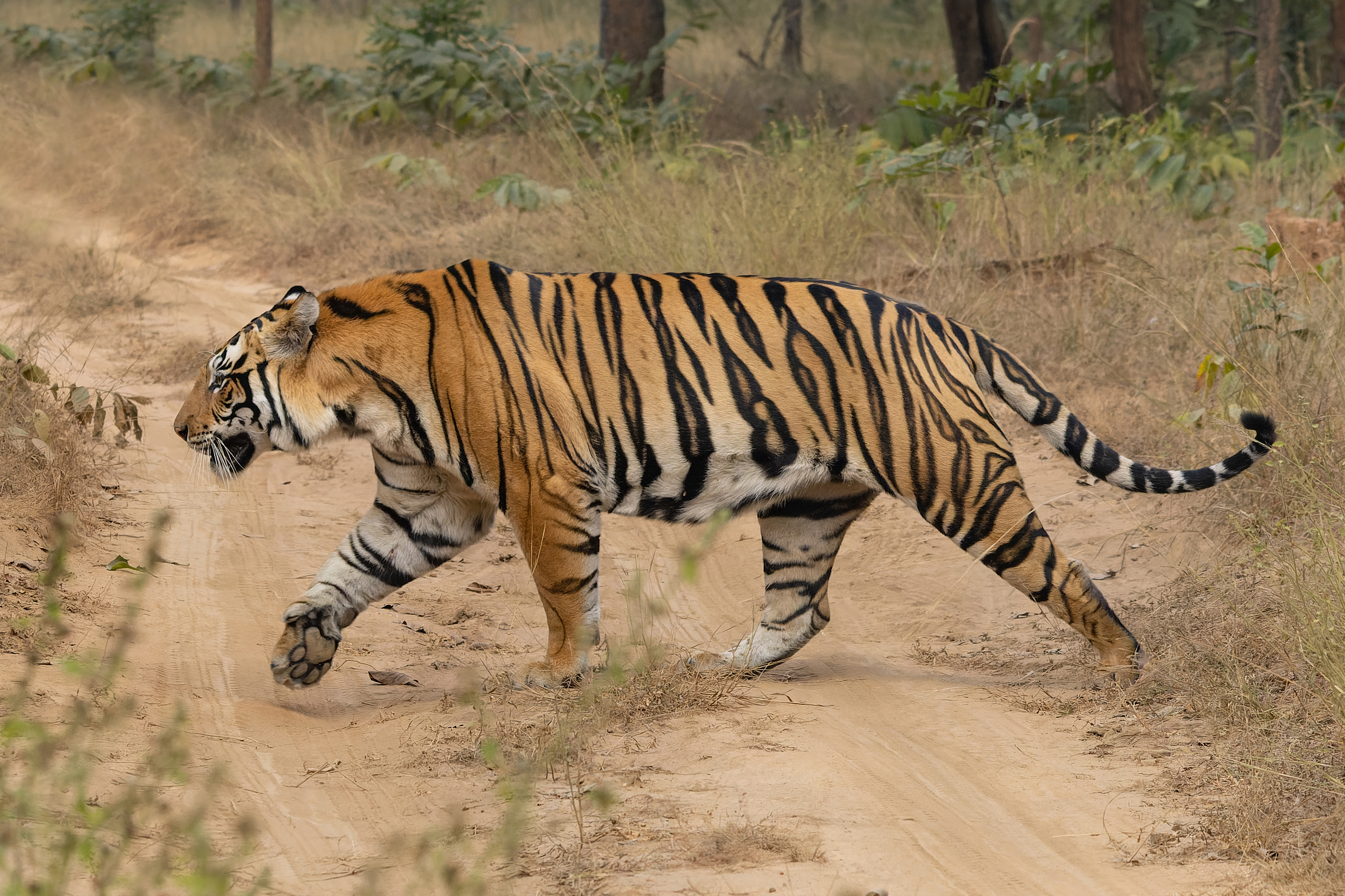
A tiger in Sanjay Dubri Tiger Reserve

Sanjay National Park hosts many wild animals, including Bengal tiger, Indian leopard, chital, sambar deer, northern red muntjac, chinkara, wild boar, nilgai, Indian elephant, sloth bear, golden jackal, striped hyena, Indian crested porcupine, jungle cat and monitor lizard.

=== Tigers ===
A white tiger named Mohan was captured by the king of Rewa, Martand Singh, in 1951 in the forest of Sidhi district, which is now part of the Sanjay Dubri Tiger Reserve. According to an official census of Madhya Pradesh carried out in 2004, Sanjay National Park had six tigers. According to the 2018 report, there were six tigers in the reserve. There were 41 tigers in July 2023.

=== Cheetah ===
In addition, considering that what used to be Surguja State is now part of Chhattisgarh, and that the state has a district called Koriya, this overall area was the last known territory of the Asiatic cheetah in India.

=== Gaur ===
The gaur disappeared in 1997. In 2023, 43 gaur from Kanha Tiger Reserve and Satpura Tiger Reserve were reintroduced.

=== Birds ===
Hawk-eagle in Sanjay Dubri

Sanjay National Park hosts many bird species, including peacock, red jungle fowl, Asian koel, Indian roller and owls.

== See also ==
- Flora and fauna of Madhya Pradesh
