= Chhuhiya =

- Location within Madhya Pradesh
- Coordinates: 24.581°N 81.836°E
- Country: India
- State: Madhya Pradesh
- District: Sidhi District

Chhuhiya is a village under Kamach Post in Kusmi Tehsil of Sidhi district of Madhya Pradesh state of India. It is birthplace of MLA Kunwar Singh Tekam.
