= Son Gharial Wildlife Sanctuary =

Wildlife sanctuary in India

- IUCN category IV (habitat/species management area)
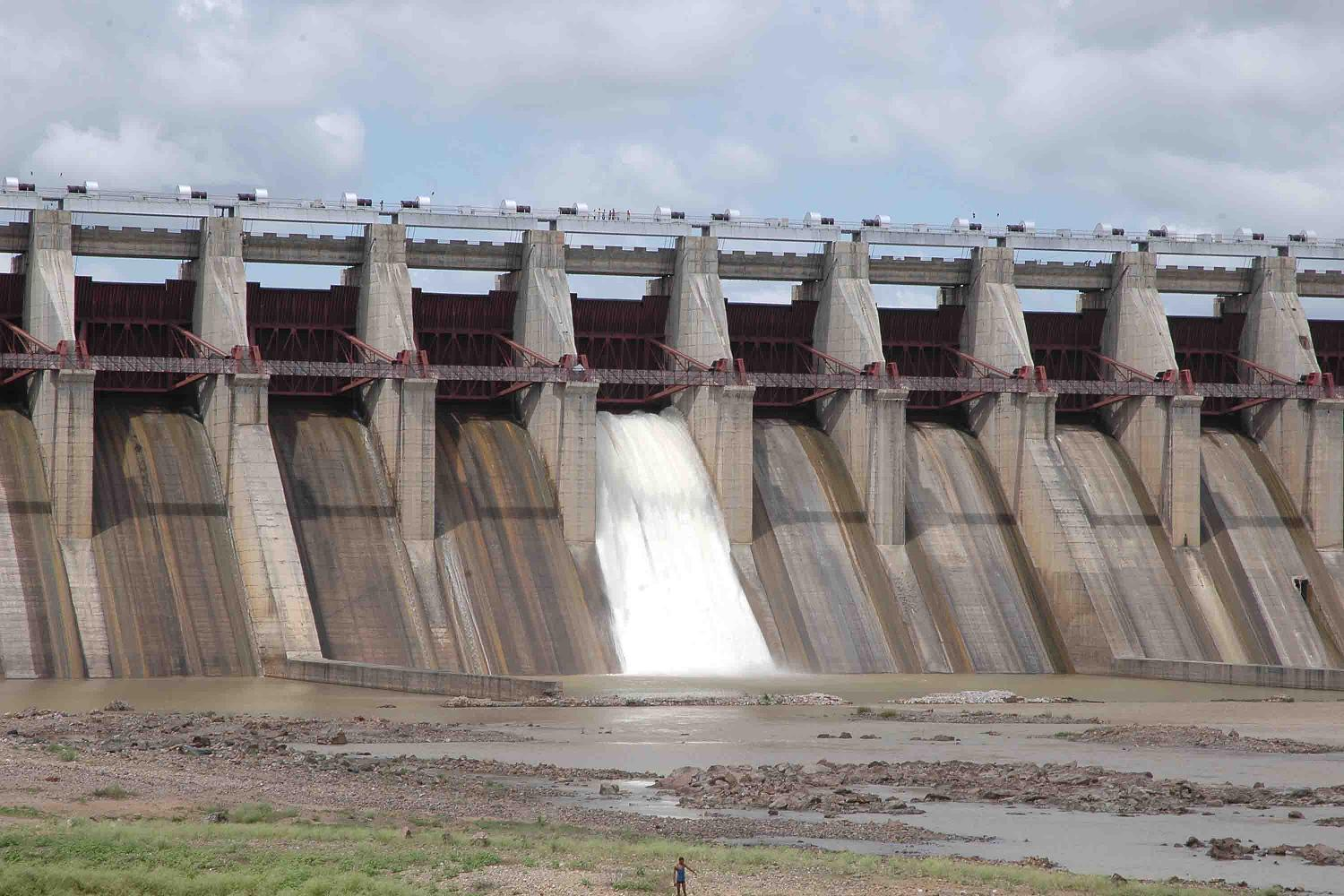
- Bansagar Dam, this is where the sanctuary begins

- Location within Madhya Pradesh
- Interactive map of Son Gharial Wildlife Sanctuary
- Location: Sidhi district, Madhya Pradesh, India
- Coordinates: 24.282934°N 81.45285°E
- Area: 105 km^{2} (41 sq mi)
- Established: 1981
- Governing body: Government of Madhya Pradesh

The Son Gharial Wildlife Sanctuary is a wildlife sanctuary located in the Sidhi district of Madhya Pradesh. It was declared a wildlife sanctuary in 1981 by the State government for the conservation of gharials.

== Overview ==
The Son Gharial Sanctuary is a wildlife sanctuary established in 1981 under Project Crocodile for the conservation of gharials. The sanctuary covers three rivers and their banks. Out of the total length of 210 km, 161 km is the Sone River, 23 km is the Banas River, and 26 km is the Gopad River. The boundary of the sanctuary starts where the Bansagar Dam is located and ends at the village of Piparghar. Total area of the sanctuary is 105 km^{2} (41 sq mi).

== History ==
Recognizing the importance of conserving riverine fauna including the Gharial, the Government of Madhya Pradesh declared the area comprising the Son River and its main two tributaries as the Son Gharial Wildlife Sanctuary by an order dated 23 September 1981. The then Chief Minister of Madhya Pradesh, Arjun Singh, officially inaugurated the sanctuary on 11 October 1981 by releasing a pair of Muggar and a pair of Gharial into the Sone River.

== Flora and fauna ==
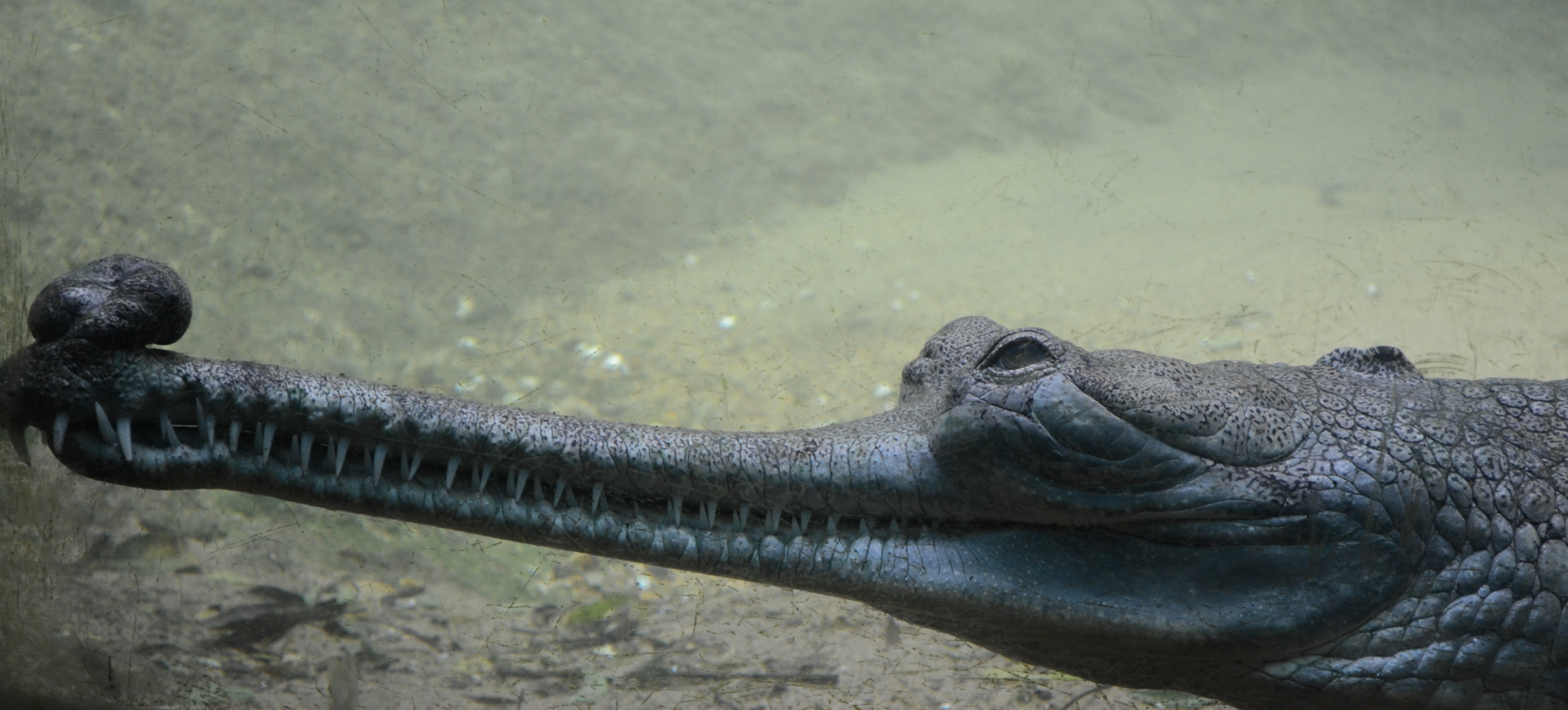
Gharial male

The rivers, its small islands and sandbanks are important habitats for several endangered and vulnerable species such as the gharial, Mugger crocodile and Indian softshell turtle. Of the 111 species of birds have been recorded in the sanctuary, seven species are near threatened, and ten are threatened. This sanctuary is a breeding ground for the rare and vulnerable bird species Indian skimmer. The breeding of Indian Skimmers indicates that the sanctuary could be an Important Bird Area.

The number of gharials in the sanctuary had been declining steadily due to the disappearance of the male population. Following this, a male gharial was brought here in December 2022, and following this 72 hatchlings were born to two female gharials, within five months.

== Threats ==
Illegal sand mining, illegal constructions, and uneven flow of water from the dam have led to a decline in the number of gharials in the wildlife sanctuary. Their number has decreased from 72 in 2016 to 20 in 2021. The Madhya Pradesh government has proposed to build a bridge on the Bahari-Hanumana road in Jogda. But it is said that Jogda is the only known breeding ground for gharials in the wildlife sanctuary and that construction activities there will affect their breeding. The release of water from Bansagar Dam during the dry season also affects the breeding of Indian skimmers.

Complaints had been raised regarding illegal mining activities near the border of the environmentally sensitive Son Gharial Wildlife Sanctuary. Following this, in 2023, the National Green Tribunal had ordered the submission of an investigation report on this matter. The two mining companies that carried out the mining were ordered to pay environmental compensation of Rs 8.16 crore and Rs 7.08 crore respectively to the UP Pollution Control Board in May 2023.

== To reach here ==
The nearest town for Son Gharial Wildlife Sanctuary is Sidhi which is 6 km away, nearest railway station is Salno which is 140 km away and nearest airport is Varanasi in Uttar Pradesh which is 228 km away.
