= Bahari, Sidhi =

Bahari Bahri
- Tehsil
- Location in Madhya Pradesh, India Bahari (India)
- Coordinates: 24.423299°N 82.177259°E
- Country: India
- State: Madhya Pradesh
- District: Sidhi
- Elevation: 272 m (892 ft)

Population (2011)
  - Total: 2,152

Languages
  - Official: Hindi
- Time zone: UTC+5:30 (IST)
- ISO 3166 code: IN-MP
- Vehicle registration: MP 53
- Website: www.sidhi.nic.in

Bahari is a tehsil and a village panchayat in Sidhi district in the Indian state of Madhya Pradesh. Bhopal is the state capital for Bahari village. It is located around 587 km from Bahari. The other nearest state capital from Bahari is Lucknow and its distance is 385.1 km. The other surrounding state capitals are Patna 442.7 km and Ranchi 416.6 km

== Geography ==
Bahari is located at 24.423299°N 82.177259°E. It has an average elevation of 394 metres (1292.65 feet). It belongs to Rewa Division . It is located 34 km towards East from District headquarters Sidhi. 29.7 km from Sihawal. 587 km from State capital Bhopal. Bhanwari (1.5 km), Mayapur (2 km), Patai (1 km), Itarsi Devgwan (1 km), Chandwahi (2), Mauganj (59), paigma (3), Mudwani (1 km), Dhutpura Kothar (1 km) are the nearby villages. Bahari is surrounded by Deosar Tehsil to the south, Sidhi Tehsil to the west, Hanumana Tehsil to the northn and Chitrangi Tehsil to the east.

Nearby cities include Sidhi, Mauganj, Singrauli, Obra, Allahabad (153 km) and Varanasi (184 km).

== Political overview ==
Indian National Congress, BJP, Bajarang Dal, Shivsena, BSP are the major political parties in this area.

Polling Stations /Booths near Bahari-

- Bhanwari
- Keswahi
- Chandwahi
- Bahari
- Devganva

== Colleges near Bahari ==
- Govt. Art & Commerce College Majhauli - Madwas & Khadaura Road Near Diyadol, Majhauli
- Tata College - Sidhi
- Bhoj Open University - Village Patulakhi Sidhi M.p.
- RIT COllege - Deosar Road, Bahari
- Mukund College - Near Bahari Dam, Bahari

== Schools in Bahari ==
- Govt Higher Secondary School (Trival) Bahari - Bahari, Sihawal, Sidhi, Madhya Pradesh .
- Nilkanth School Bahari - Near chaturvedi Petrol Pump, Bahari
- Aman Convent High School, Bahari - Near Bus Stand, Bahari
- Sarswati Shishu Mandir Bahari
- Golden Star School (English Medium) Bahari Near Chaturvedi Filling Station, Deosar road bahari
- Mukund Public School, Bahari - New Bahari Dam, Bahari

== Places to visit ==
- Shri Neelkanth Swami Mauhaar Dhaam, Mauhaar
- Maa Sharda Mandir, Karkachaha
- Rani Kumari Mandir, Lauaa
- Son Ghadhiyaal Abhyarany
- ShriVats Seva Sansthan, Bahari
- Son River
- Gopad Banas River
- Budhi Mata Mandir Patulakhi.

== Notable people ==
- Riti Pathak, (BJP) Member of Parliament, Parliamentary Constituency No. 11 Sidhi
