= Pratyoosh Shukla =

Indian microbiologist

Pratyoosh Shukla (born 2 April 1977, Sidhi, Madhya Pradesh) is an Indian microbiologist specialized in enzyme technology and protein bioinformatics. He is currently working as Professor of the School of Biotechnology at the Institute of Science, Banaras Hindu University, Varanasi, India. He was awarded with the Indo-USA Research Professor at Department of Environmental Health, College of Medicine, University of Cincinnati, USA in 2014 by the American Society of Microbiology (ASM) and Indo-U.S. Science and Technology Forum (IUSSTF). He was also awarded the Prof. CNR Rao Foundation Award for Excellence in Scientific Research. He is a Fellow of the National Academy of Sciences, India (FNASc), the National Academy of Agricultural Sciences (FNAAS), the Academy of Microbiological Sciences (FAMSc/FAMI), and the Biotech Research Society of India (FBRS).

Shukla and his research group focus on the integration of tools and techniques in microbe assisted biotechnological processes for environmental sustainability, bioproducts including bio-energy, and cost effective bioprocesses.

== Education ==
Upon completing his bachelor's degree (B.Sc.), he went on to complete his master's degree in sciences (applied microbiology and biotechnology) from Dr. Hari Singh Gour University, Sagar M.P India in 1999. In 2002, he earned his Ph.D. in microbiology from the APS University, Rewa, India. He received a NRF-DUT Post Doctoral Fellowship at Enzyme Technology Group, Durban University of Technology, Durban. He was awarded a D.Sc. in Microbiology in 2020 from Barkatullah University, Bhopal, India for his significant contribution in the area of 'computational enzyme engineering'.

== Research ==
His research group is working on the integration of techniques in microbe assisted biotechnological processes. Shukla has researched microbial bioprocesses optimization using artificial intelligence based tools, especially on microbial enzymes and cyanobacterial bio-pigments, and their contribution in gene networks and metabolic significance. In addition, he also works on other applications of cyanobacterial biotechnology and the development of microalgal harvesting methods using natural biopolymers and valorization of microalgal biomass. His research group has been featured by bioGraphic on using microbiomes to break down waste.
