= Dhauhani Assembly constituency =

Constituency of the Madhya Pradesh legislative assembly in India

Coordinates: 24.14°N 82.06°E

Dhauhani
- Constituency No. 82 for the Madhya Pradesh Legislative Assembly

Constituency details
- Country: India
- Region: Central India
- State: Madhya Pradesh
- District: Sidhi
- Lok Sabha constituency: Sidhi
- Established: 1976
- Reservation: ST

Member of Legislative Assembly
- 16th Madhya Pradesh Legislative Assembly
- Incumbent Kunwar Singh Tekam
- Party: Bharatiya Janata Party
- Elected year: 2023
- Preceded by: Chhatra Pati Singh

Dhauhani is one of the 230 Vidhan Sabha (Legislative Assembly) constituencies of Madhya Pradesh state in central India. It was established by The Delimitation of Parliamentary and Assembly Constituencies Order, 1976 and is part of Sidhi District. As of 2023, it is represented by Kunwar Singh Tekam of the Bharatiya Janata Party.

== Members of the Legislative Assembly ==
Election	Name	Party
2003	Chhatra Pati Singh	Bharatiya Janata Party
2008	Kunwar Singh Tekam	Bharatiya Janata Party
2013	Kunwar Singh Tekam	Bharatiya Janata Party
2018	Kunwar Singh Tekam	Bharatiya Janata Party
2023	Kunwar Singh Tekam	Bharatiya Janata Party

== Election results ==
=== 2023 ===
2023 Madhya Pradesh Legislative Assembly election: Dhauhani
Party	Candidate	Votes	%	±%
BJP	Kunwar Singh Tekam	82,063	44.14	+8.29
INC	Kamlesh Singh	78,742	42.36	+8.86
GGP	Laldev Singh Kusharam	11,724	6.31	−5.72
Jan Adhikar Party	Pragya Singh	2,065	1.11	
Independent	Ram Singh S/O Karan Singh	1,783	0.96	
NOTA	None of the above	3,459	1.86	+0.12
Majority		3,321	1.78	−0.57
Turnout		185,906	74.01	−0.06
BJP hold		Swing		

=== 2018 ===
2018 Madhya Pradesh Legislative Assembly election: Dhauhani
Party	Candidate	Votes	%	±%
BJP	Kunwar Singh Tekam	57,995	35.85	
INC	Kamlesh Singh	54,202	33.5	
GGP	Rupnarayan Singh Poya	19,457	12.03	
BSP	Awadh Pratap Singh	9,062	5.6	
Independent	Rajendra Kol	2,485	1.54	
Independent	Mahipal Singh	2,440	1.51	
CPI(M)	Balraj Singh	2,224	1.37	
Independent	Revti Singh Maravi	1,974	1.22	
SS	Dharvend Baiga	1,871	1.16	
AAP	Girdhari Baiga	1,747	1.08	
Bhartiya Shakti Chetna Party	Kamalsay Panika	1,589	0.98	
NOTA	None of the above	2,810	1.74	
Majority		3,793	2.35	
Turnout		161,786	74.07	
BJP hold		Swing		
