= Chandreh =

Village in Madhya Pradesh, India

Chandreh Chandrehi, Chandrehe
- Village
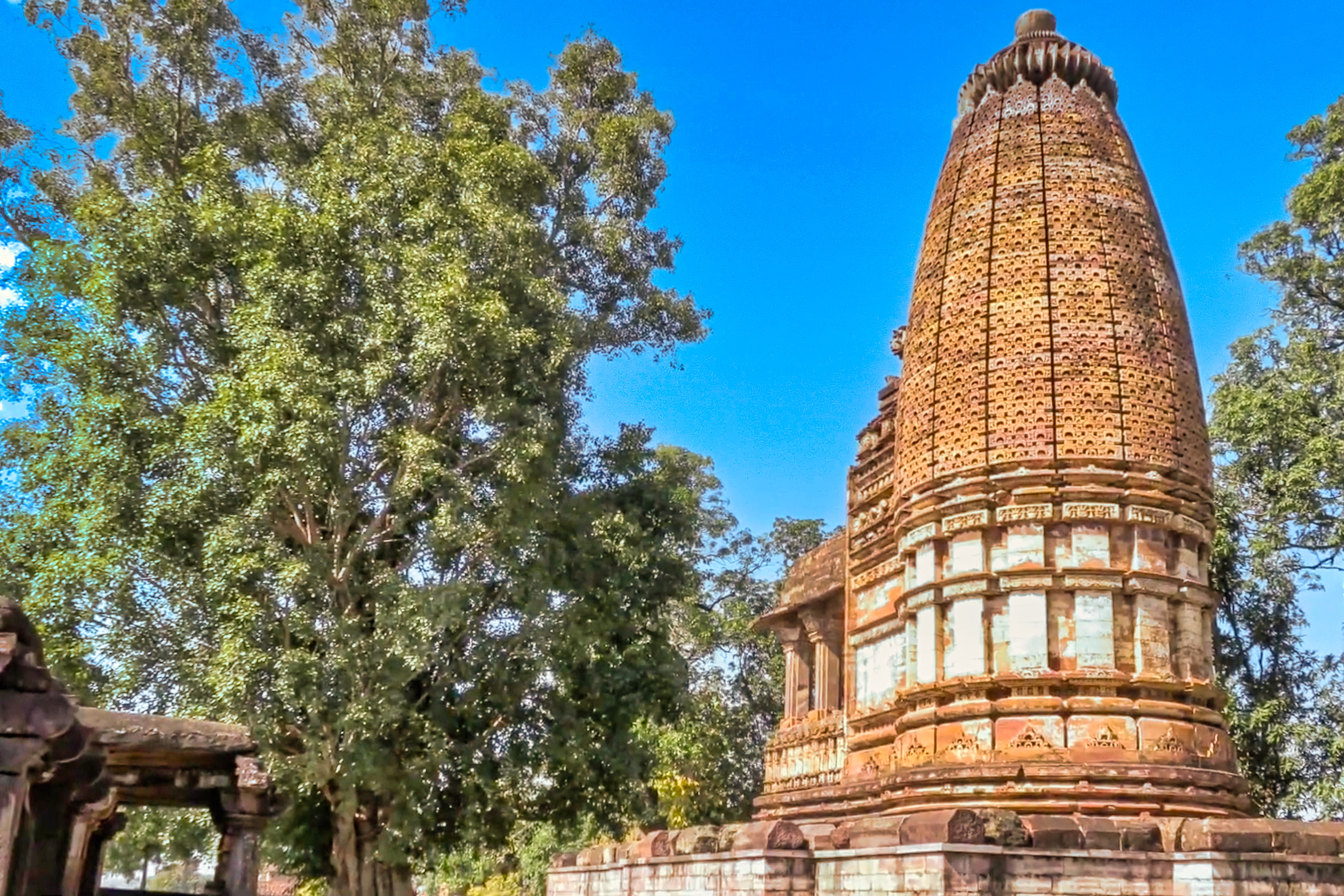
- 10th-century temple of Shiva at Chandreh

- Location in Madhya Pradesh, India
- Coordinates: 24.29064°N 81.47726°E
- Country: India
- State: Madhya Pradesh
- District: Sidhi
- Tehsil: Gopadbanas

Area
  - Total: 5.41 km^{2} (2.09 sq mi)

Population (2011)
  - Total: 1,823
  - Density: 337/km^{2} (873/sq mi)
- Time zone: UTC+5:30 (IST)

Chandreh, also spelled Chandrehi or Chandrehe, is a village in Rampur Naikin block of Sidhi district, Madhya Pradesh. Located near the confluence of the Son and Banas rivers, it is known for its 10th-century Shiva temple and monastery. As of 2011, Chandreh has a population of 1,823, in 370 households.

== Geography ==
Chandreh is located 1.6 km east of the confluence of the Son and Banas rivers, and about 24 km southwest of Sidhi, the district headquarters.

== History ==
The earliest evidence of human habitation at Chandreh consists of archaeological from the early and middle Neolithic period.

In the 10th century, there was a wave of construction at Chandreh linked to the Shaivite sect known as the Mattamayūra. These include a temple to Shiva, an adjoining monastery (matha), and an irrigation tank and a well. An inscription in the monastery identifies it as being built (or completed) in March 973, on the orders of the Mattamayūra leader Prabodhashiva. The temple was constructed by Prabodhashiva's predecessor Prashantashiva sometime earlier in the century.

The temple is made of sandstone and has a rather unique design, featuring a high raised foundation, a chaitya-like floor plan, and a shikhara decorated with a gavaksha motif also reminiscent of chaityas. The monastery has two levels and is also made of sandstone.

== Demographics ==
As of 2011, Chandreh had a population of 1,823, in 390 households. This population was 51.5% male (921) and 49.5% female (902). The 0-6 age group numbered 284 (147 male and 137 female), making up 15.6% of the total population. 100 residents were members of Scheduled Castes, or 5.5% of the total.

== Infrastructure ==
As of 2011, Chandreh had 1 primary school; it did not have any healthcare facilities. The village had a sub post office but no public library; there was at least some access to electricity for all purposes. Streets were made of kachcha materials.

== Gallery ==
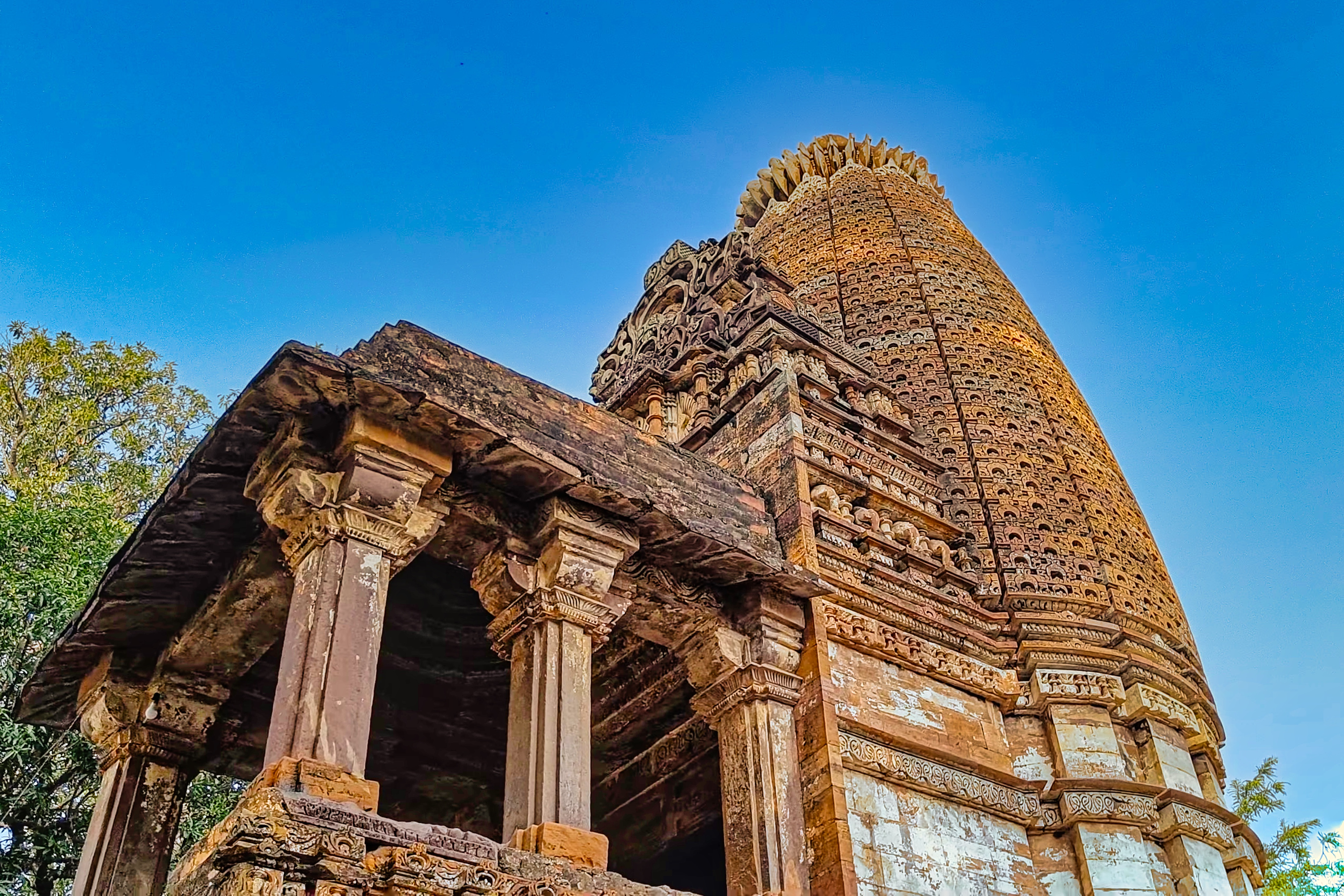

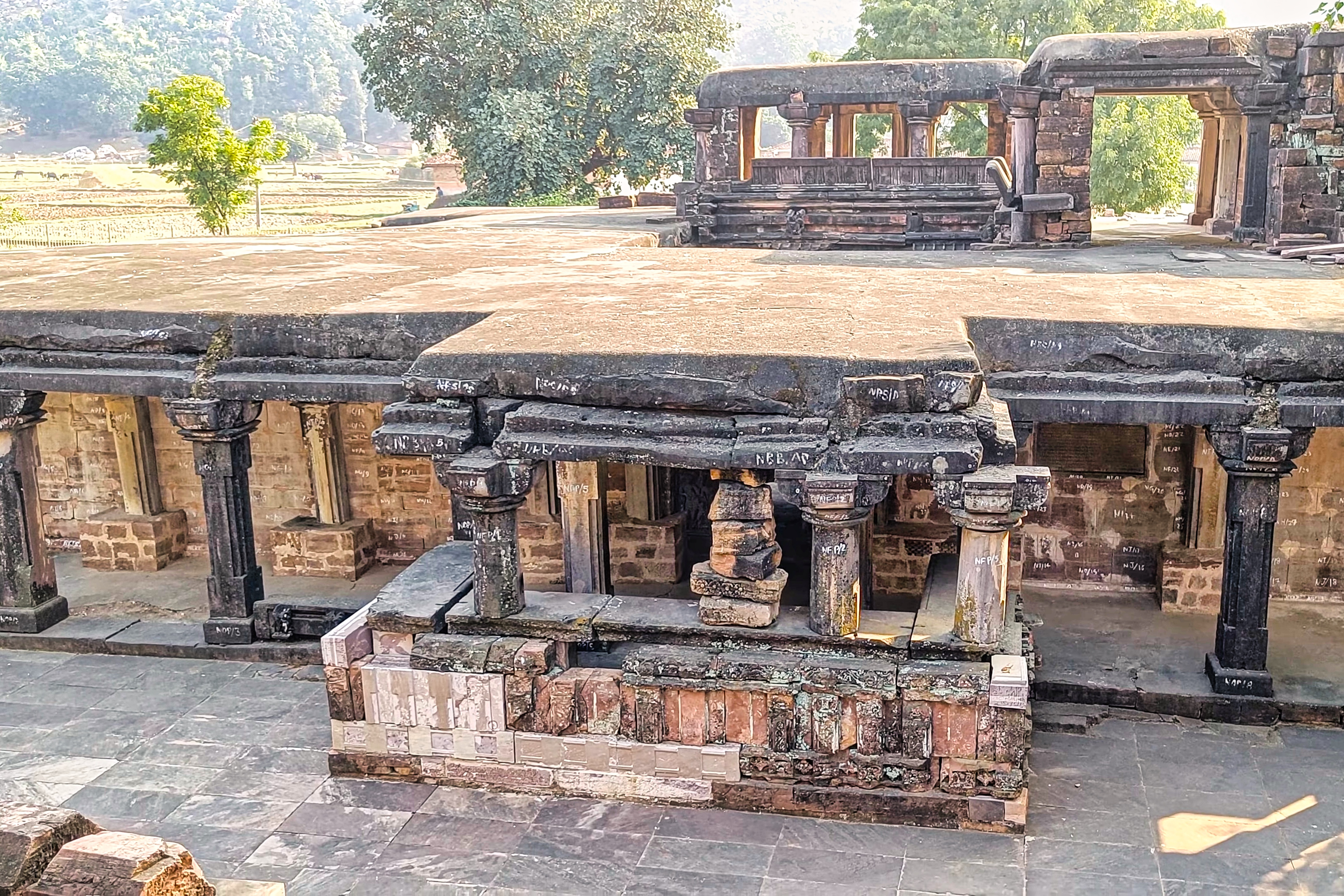

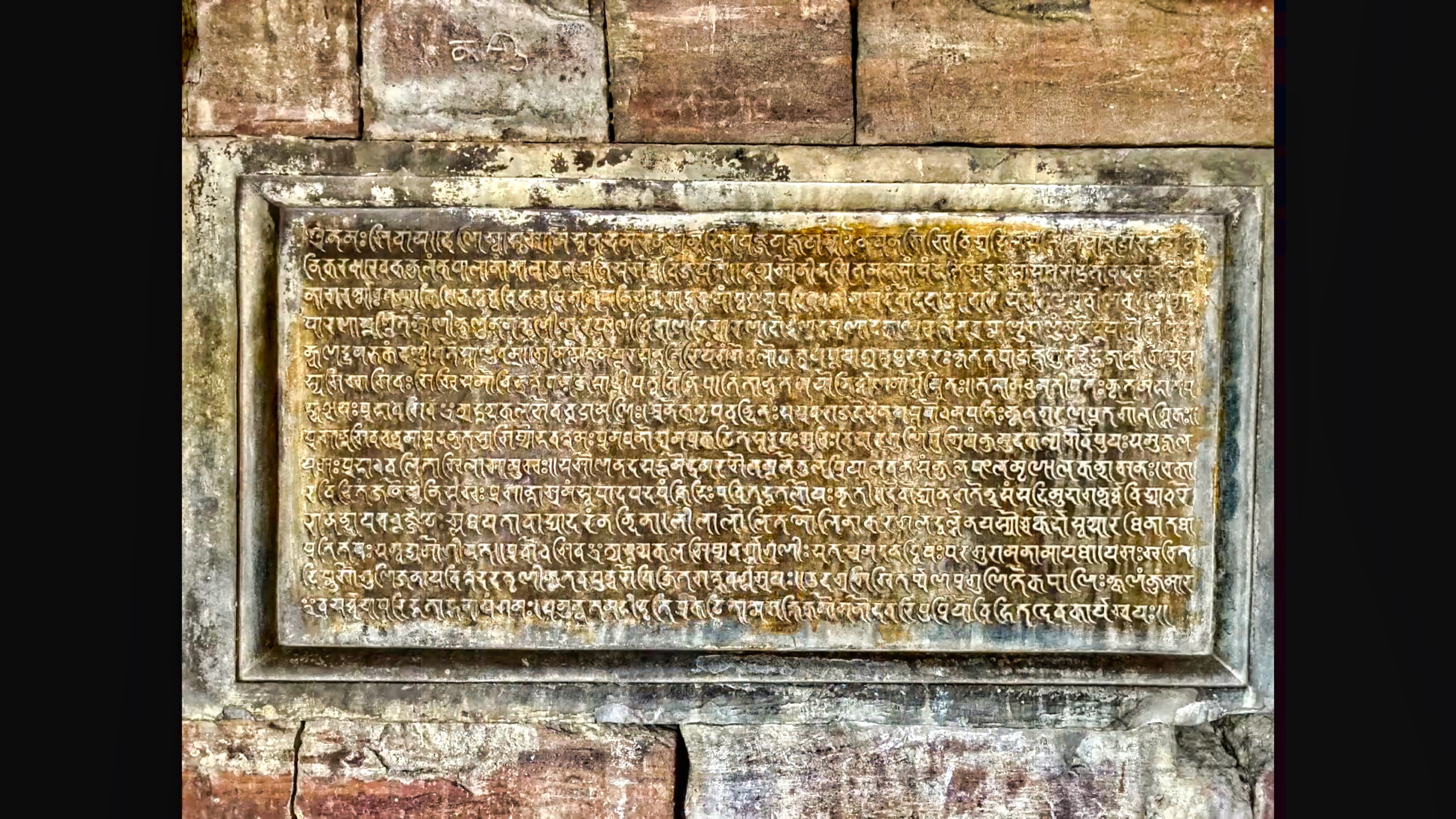
