= White tiger =

Tiger morph

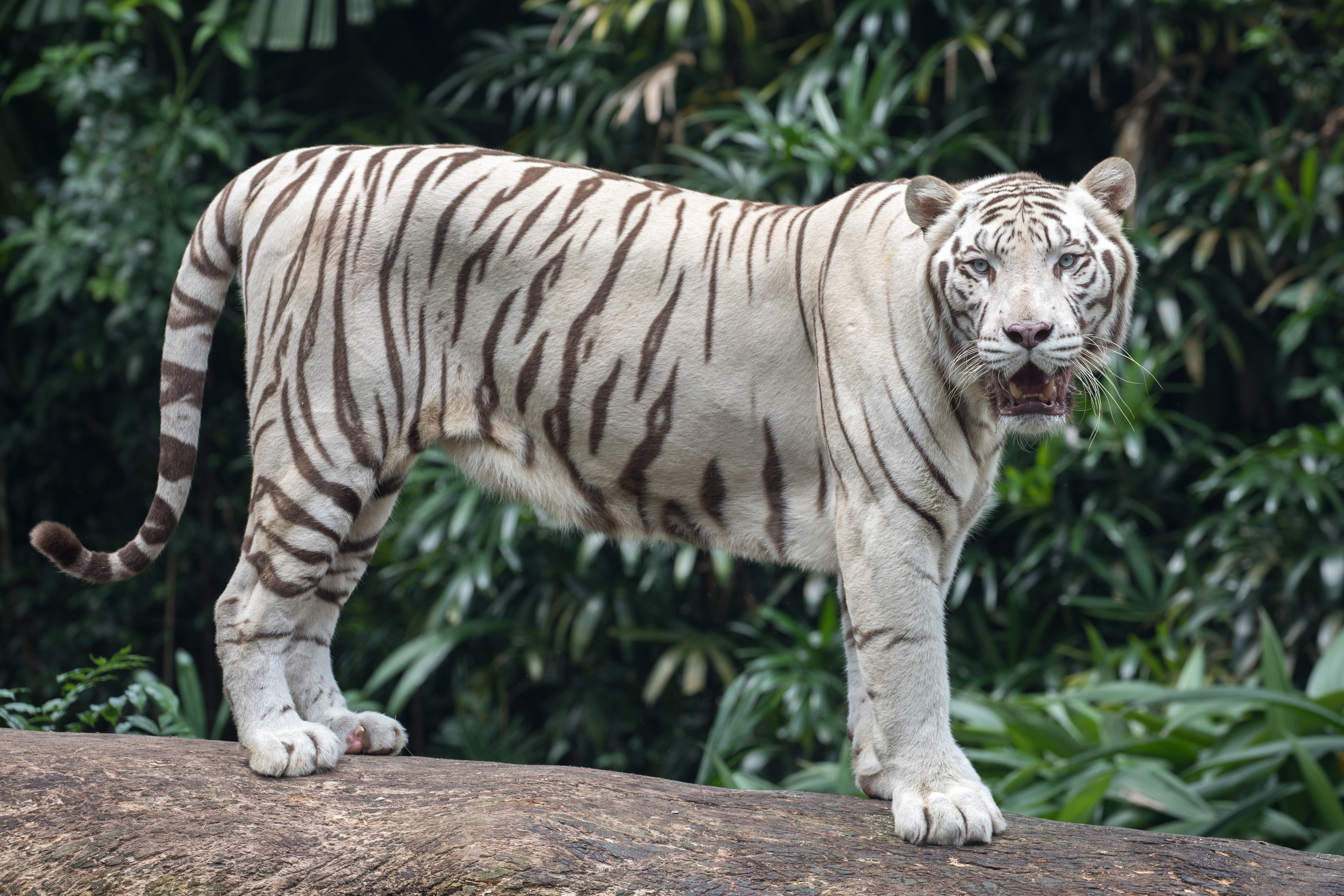
A captive white tiger at the Singapore Zoo

The white tiger is a leucistic morph of the tiger, typically the Bengal tiger. A white tiger has the typical black stripes of a tiger, but its coat is otherwise white or near-white, and it has blue eyes. Natural occurrences of this mutation are occasionally reported in the wild in India. The vast majority of white tigers are a result of intentional inbreeding for human entertainment, a practice which is banned by the Association of Zoos and Aquariums for institutions wishing to be accredited.

== Variation ==
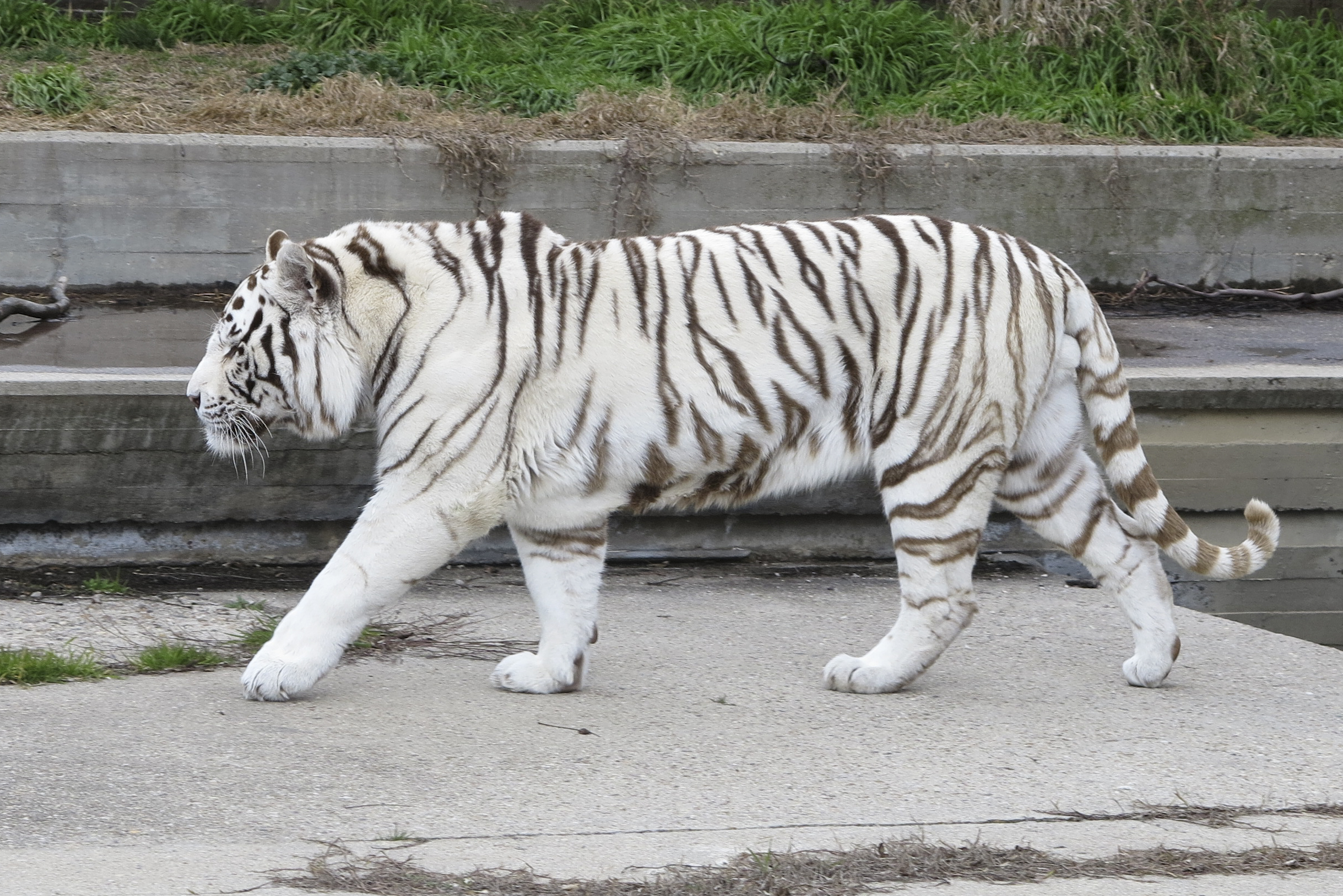
A white tiger at the Madrid Zoo

White tigers have been recorded in India since the 16th century CE. The first white tiger was captured in 1951. A white tiger named Mohan was captured by the king of Rewa, Martand Singh, in 1951 from the forest of Mukundpur, Sidhi district, which is now part of the Sanjay Dubri Tiger Reserve. All white tigers found in zoos around the world are the offspring of Mohan. According to Kailash Sankhala, the last white tiger ever seen in the wild was shot in 1958. White Bengal tigers are distinctive due to the color of their fur. The white fur is caused by a lack of the pigment pheomelanin, which is found in Bengal tigers with orange fur. When compared to orange Bengal tigers, the white Bengal tigers tend to grow faster and become heavier than the orange Bengal tiger. They also tend to be somewhat bigger, both at birth, and as adults. White Bengal tigers are fully grown when they are 2–3 years of age. White male tigers reach weights of 200 to 230 kilograms (440 to 510 lb) and can grow up to 3 meters (9.8 ft) in length. As with all tigers, the white Bengal tiger's stripes are like fingerprints, with no two tigers having the same pattern. The stripes of the tiger are a pigmentation of the skin; if an individual were to be shaved, its distinctive coat pattern would still be visible.

For a white Bengal tiger to be born, both parents must carry the unusual gene for white colouring, which happens naturally only about once in 10,000 births. Dark-striped white individuals are well-documented in the Bengal tiger subspecies (Panthera tigris tigris) as well as having been reported historically in several other subspecies. Currently, several hundred white tigers are in captivity worldwide, with about one hundred being found in India. Their unique colouring has made them popular at zoos, and in entertainment showcasing exotic animals. Their rarity could be because the recessive allele is the result of a one-time mutation, or because white tigers lack adequate camouflage, reducing their ability to stalk prey or survive predation when it is a cub.

== Genetics ==
A white tiger in a zoo in Japan

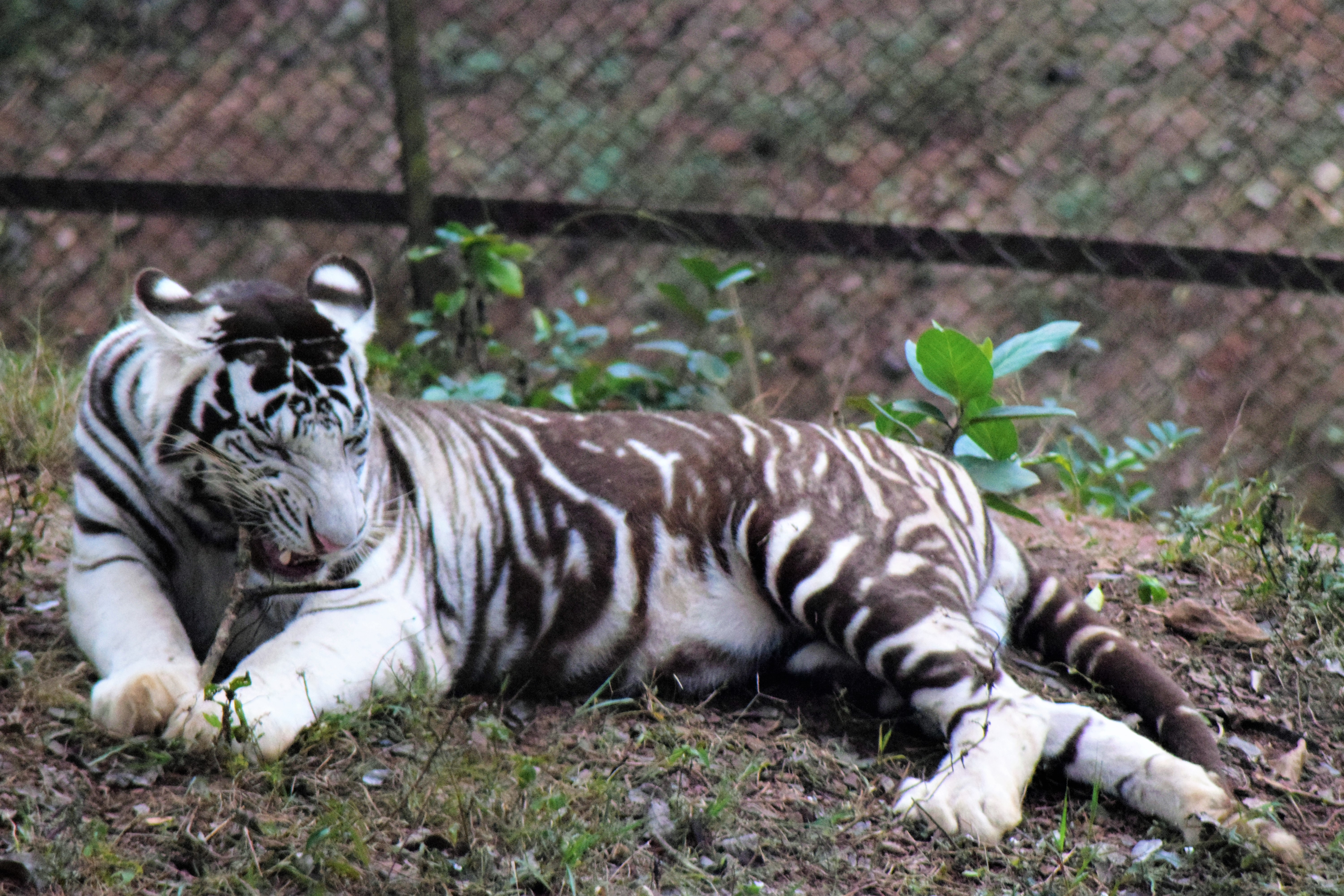
Pseudo-melanistic white tiger

A white tiger's pale coloration is due to the lack of the red and yellow pheomelanin pigments that normally produce the orange coloration. This had long been attributed to a mutation in the gene for the tyrosinase (TYR) enzyme. A knockout mutation in this gene results in albinism, the ability to make neither pheomelanin (red and yellow pigments) nor eumelanin (black and brown pigments), while a less severe mutation in the same gene in other mammals results in selective loss of pheomelanin, the so-called Chinchilla trait. The white phenotype in tigers had been attributed to such a Chinchilla mutation in tyrosinase, and in the past white tigers were sometimes referred to as 'partial albinos'. While whole genome sequencing determined that such a TYR mutation is responsible for the white lion leucistic variant, a normal TYR gene was found in both white tigers and snow leopards. Instead, in white tigers, a naturally occurring point mutation in the SLC45A2 transport protein gene was found to underlie its pigmentation. The resultant single amino acid substitution introduces an alanine residue that protrudes into the transport protein's central passageway, apparently blocking it, and by a mechanism yet to be determined, this prevents pheomelanin expression in the fur. Mutations in the same gene are known to result in 'cream' coloration in horses, and play a role in the paler skin of humans of European descent. This is a recessive trait, meaning that it is seen only in individuals that are homozygous for this mutation, and that while the progeny of white tigers will all be white, white tigers can be also bred from colored Bengal tiger pairs in which each possesses a single copy of the unique mutation. Inbreeding promotes recessive traits and has been used as a strategy to produce white tigers in captivity, but this has also resulted in a range of other genetic defects.

The stripe color varies due to the influence and interaction of other genes. Another genetic characteristic makes the stripes of the tiger very pale; white tigers of this type are called snow-white or "pure white". White tigers, Siamese cats, and Himalayan rabbits have enzymes in their fur which react to temperature, causing them to grow darker in the cold. At Bristol Zoo, a white tiger named Mohini was whiter than her relatives, who showed more cream tones. This may have been because she spent less time outdoors in the winter. Kailash Sankhala observed that white tigers were always whiter in Rewa State, even when they were born in New Delhi and returned there. "In spite of living in a dusty courtyard, they were always snow white." A weakened immune system is directly linked to reduced pigmentation in white tigers.

=== Stripeless tigers ===
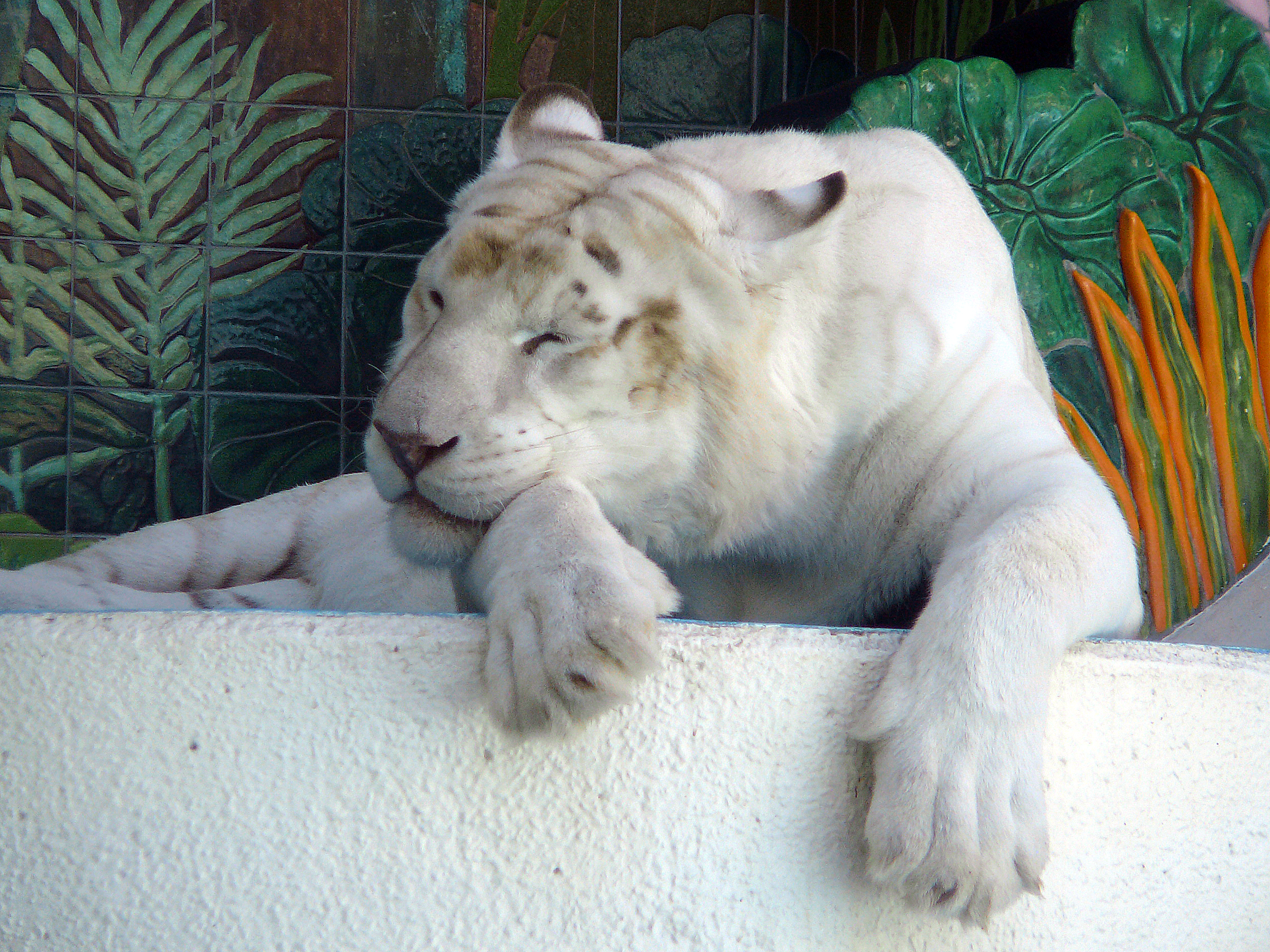
A white tiger with almost no stripes at The Mirage in Las Vegas, the United States of America

An additional genetic condition can result in near-complete absence of stripes, making the tiger almost pure white. One such specimen was exhibited at Exeter Change in London in 1820, and described by Georges Cuvier as "A white variety of Tiger is sometimes seen, with the stripes very opaque, and not to be observed except in certain angles of light." Naturalist Richard Lydekker said that, "a white tiger, in which the fur was of a creamy tint, with the usual stripes faintly visible in certain parts, was exhibited at the old menagerie at Exeter Change about the year 1820." Hamilton Smith said, "A wholly white tiger, with the stripe-pattern visible only under reflected light, like the pattern of a white tabby cat, was exhibited in the Exeter Change Menagerie in 1820" and John George Wood stated that, "a creamy white, with the ordinary tigerine stripes so faintly marked that they were only visible in certain lights." Edwin Henry Landseer also drew this tigress in 1824.

The modern strain of snow-white tigers came from repeated brother–sister matings of Bhim and Sumita at Cincinnati Zoo. The gene involved may have come from a Siberian tiger, their part-Siberian ancestor, Tony. Continued inbreeding appears to have caused a recessive gene to become homozygous and produce the stripeless phenotype. About one fourth of Bhim and Sumita's offspring were stripeless. Their striped white offspring, which have been sold to zoos around the world, may also carry the gene for the stripeless trait. Because Tony's genome is present in many white tiger pedigrees, the gene may also be present in other captive white tigers. As a result, stripeless white tigers have appeared in zoos as far afield as the Czech Republic (Liberec), Spain and Mexico. Stage magicians Siegfried & Roy were the first to attempt to selectively breed for stripeless tigers; they owned snow-white Bengal tigers taken from Cincinnati Zoo (Tsumura, Mantra, Mirage and Akbar-Kabul) and Guadalajara, Mexico (Vishnu and Jahan), as well as a stripeless Siberian tiger called Apollo.

In 2004, a blue-eyed, stripeless white tiger was born in a wildlife refuge in Alicante, Spain. Its parents are normal orange tigers. The cub was named "Artico" ("Arctic").

=== Defects ===
Outside of India, inbred white tigers have been prone to crossed eyes, a condition known as strabismus, due to incorrectly routed visual pathways in the brains of white tigers. When stressed or confused, all white tigers cross their eyes. Strabismus is associated with white tigers of mixed Bengal and Siberian ancestry. The only pure-Bengal white tiger reported to be cross-eyed was Mohini's daughter, Rewati. Strabismus is directly linked to the white gene and is not a separate consequence of inbreeding.

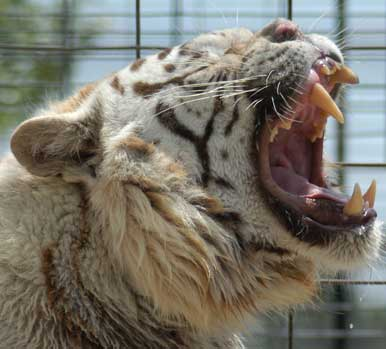
Kenny, a victim of inbreeding rescued by the Turpentine Creek Wildlife Refuge in October 2000. He experienced many health problems over the course of his life and died in 2008.

The orange litter-mates of white tigers are not prone to strabismus. Siamese cats and albinos of every species which have been studied all exhibit the same visual pathway abnormality found in white tigers. Siamese cats are also sometimes cross-eyed, as are some albino ferrets. The visual pathway abnormality was first documented in white tigers in the brain of a white tiger named Moni after he died, although his eyes were of normal alignment. The abnormality is that there is a disruption in the optic chiasm. The examination of Moni's brain suggested the disruption is less severe in white tigers than it is in Siamese cats. Because of the visual pathway abnormality, by which some optic nerves are routed to the wrong side of the brain, white tigers have a problem with spatial orientation, and bump into things until they learn to compensate. Some tigers compensate by crossing their eyes. When the neurons pass from the retina to the brain and reach the optic chiasma, some cross and some do not, so that visual images are projected to the wrong hemisphere of the brain. White tigers cannot see as well as normal tigers and suffer from photophobia, like albinos.

Other genetic problems include shortened tendons of the forelegs, club foot, kidney problems, an arched or crooked backbone and a twisted neck. Reduced fertility and miscarriages, noted by "tiger man" Kailash Sankhala in pure-Bengal white tigers, were attributed to inbreeding depression. A condition known as "star-gazing" (the head and neck are raised almost straight up, as if the affected animal is gazing at the stars), which is associated with inbreeding in big cats, has also been reported in white tigers.

There was a 200 kg (450 lb) male cross-eyed white tiger at the Pana'ewa Rainforest Zoo in Hawaii, which was donated to the zoo by Las Vegas magician Dirk Arthur. There is a photo of a white tiger which appears to be cross-eyed on just one side in the book Siegfried and Roy: Mastering the Impossible. A white tiger, named Scarlett O'Hara, who was Tony's sister, was cross-eyed only on the right side.

A male tiger named 'Cheytan', a son of Bhim and Sumita who was born at the Cincinnati Zoo, died at the San Antonio Zoo in 1992, from anaesthesia complications during root canal therapy. It appears that white tigers also react strangely to anaesthesia. The best drug for immobilizing a tiger is CI 744, but a few tigers, white ones in particular, undergo a re-sedation effect 24–36 hours later. This is due to their inability to produce normal tyrosinase, a trait they share with albinos, according to zoo veterinarian David Taylor. He treated a pair of white tigers from the Cincinnati Zoo at Fritz Wurm's safari park in Stukenbrock, Germany, for salmonella poisoning, which reacted strangely to the anaesthesia.

Mohini was checked for Chédiak–Higashi syndrome in 1960, but the results were inconclusive. This condition is similar to albino mutations and causes bluish lightening of the fur color, crossed eyes, and prolonged bleeding after surgery. Also, in the event of an injury, the blood is slow to coagulate. This condition has been observed in domestic cats, but there has never been a case of a white tiger having Chédiak–Higashi syndrome. There has been a single case of a white tiger having central retinal degeneration, reported from the Milwaukee County Zoo, which could be related to reduced pigmentation in the eye. The white tiger in question was a male named Mota on loan from the Cincinnati Zoo.

There is a myth that white tigers have an 80% infant mortality rate. However, the infant mortality rate for white tigers is no higher than it is for normal orange tigers bred in captivity. Cincinnati Zoo director Ed Maruska said:

"We have not experienced premature death among our white tigers. Forty-two animals born in our collection are still alive. Mohan, a large white tiger, died just short of his 20th birthday, an enviable age for a male of any subspecies, since most males live shorter captive lives. Premature deaths in other collections may be artifacts of captive environmental conditions...in 52 births we had four stillbirths, one of which was an unexplained loss. We lost two additional cubs from viral pneumonia, which is not excessive. Without data from non-inbred tiger lines, it is difficult to determine whether this number is high or low with any degree of accuracy."

Ed Maruska also addressed the issue of deformities:

"Other than a case of hip dysplasia that occurred in a male white tiger, we have not encountered any other body deformities or any physiological or neurological disorders. Some of these reported maladies in mutant tigers in other collections may be a direct result of inbreeding or improper rearing management of tigers generally."

== Inbreeding and outcrossing ==
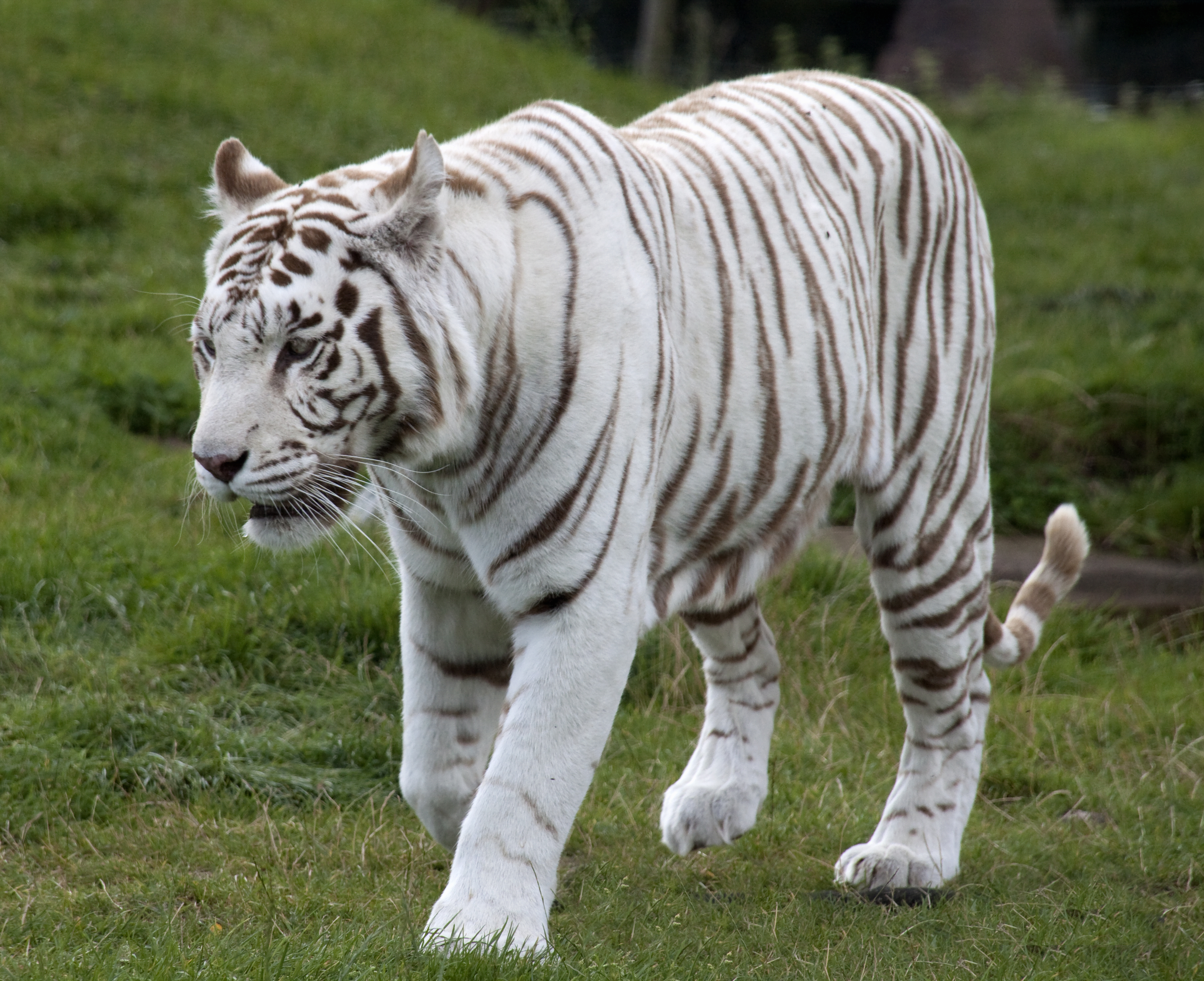
A captive white tiger in Birmingham, United Kingdom

A captive white tiger in Beijing Wildlife Park, China

Because of the extreme rarity of the white tiger allele in the wild, the breeding pool was limited to the small number of white tigers in captivity. According to Kailash Sankhala, the last white tiger ever seen in the wild was shot in 1958. Today, a large number of white tigers are in captivity. A white Amur tiger may have been born at Center Hill and has given rise to a strain of white Amur tigers. A man named Robert Baudy realized that his tigers had white genes when a tiger he sold to Marwell Zoo in the United Kingdom developed white spots, and bred them accordingly. The Lowry Park Zoo in Tampa Bay had four of these white Amur tigers, descended from Robert Baudy's stock.

It has also been possible to expand the white-gene pool by outcrossing white tigers with unrelated orange tigers and then using the cubs to produce more white tigers. The white tigers Ranjit, Bharat, Priya and Bhim were all outcrossed, in some instances to more than one tiger. Bharat was bred to an unrelated orange tiger named Jack from the San Francisco Zoo and had an orange daughter named Kanchana. Bharat and Priya were also bred with an unrelated orange tiger from Knoxville Zoo, and Ranjit was bred to this tiger's sister, also from Knoxville Zoo. Bhim fathered several litters with an unrelated orange tigress named Kimanthi at the Cincinnati Zoo.

The last descendants of Bristol Zoo's white tigers were a group of orange tigers from outcrosses which were bought by a Pakistani senator and shipped to Pakistan. Rajiv, Pretoria Zoo's white tiger, who was born in the Cincinnati Zoo, was also outcrossed and sired at least two litters of orange cubs at Pretoria Zoo. Outcrossing is not necessarily done with the intent of producing more white cubs by resuming inbreeding further down the line. Outcrossing is a way of bringing fresh blood into the white strain. The New Delhi Zoo loaned out white tigers to some of India's better zoos for outcrossing, and the government had to impose a whip to force zoos to return either the white tigers or their orange offspring.

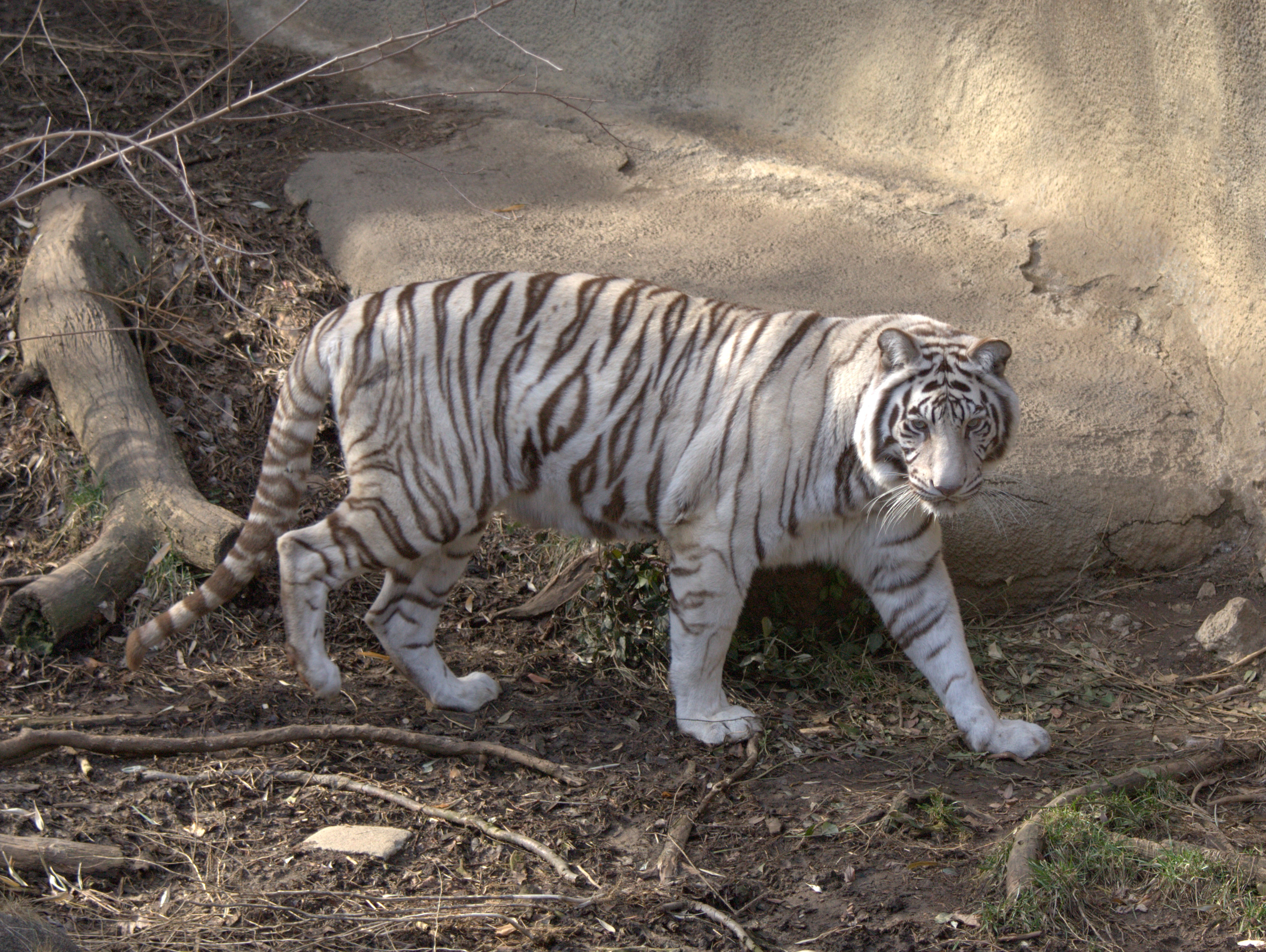
A white Bengal tiger at the Cincinnati Zoo

Siegfried & Roy performed at least one outcross. In the mid-1980s they offered to work with the Indian government in the creation of a healthier strain of white tigers. The Indian government reportedly considered the offer; however, India had a moratorium on breeding white tigers after cubs were born at New Delhi Zoo with arched backs and clubbed feet, necessitating euthanasia. Siegfried & Roy have bred white tigers in collaboration with the Nashville Zoo.

To better preserve genetic diversity and avoid genetic defects, the Association of Zoos and Aquariums barred member zoos from intentionally breeding to produce white tigers, white lions, or king cheetahs in a white paper adopted by the board of directors in July 2011. The paper explains that selecting for or against any particular allele would result in a loss of genetic diversity. Instead, the alleles should be maintained at their natural frequencies. Inbreeding to produce abnormal appearances can also produce congenital defects that impact health and welfare. Sometimes the traits themselves can cause problems, such as albinism's visual and neural effects. Additionally, animals with an abnormal appearance do not serve as well as ambassadors for their species in the zoos' mission to educate the public.

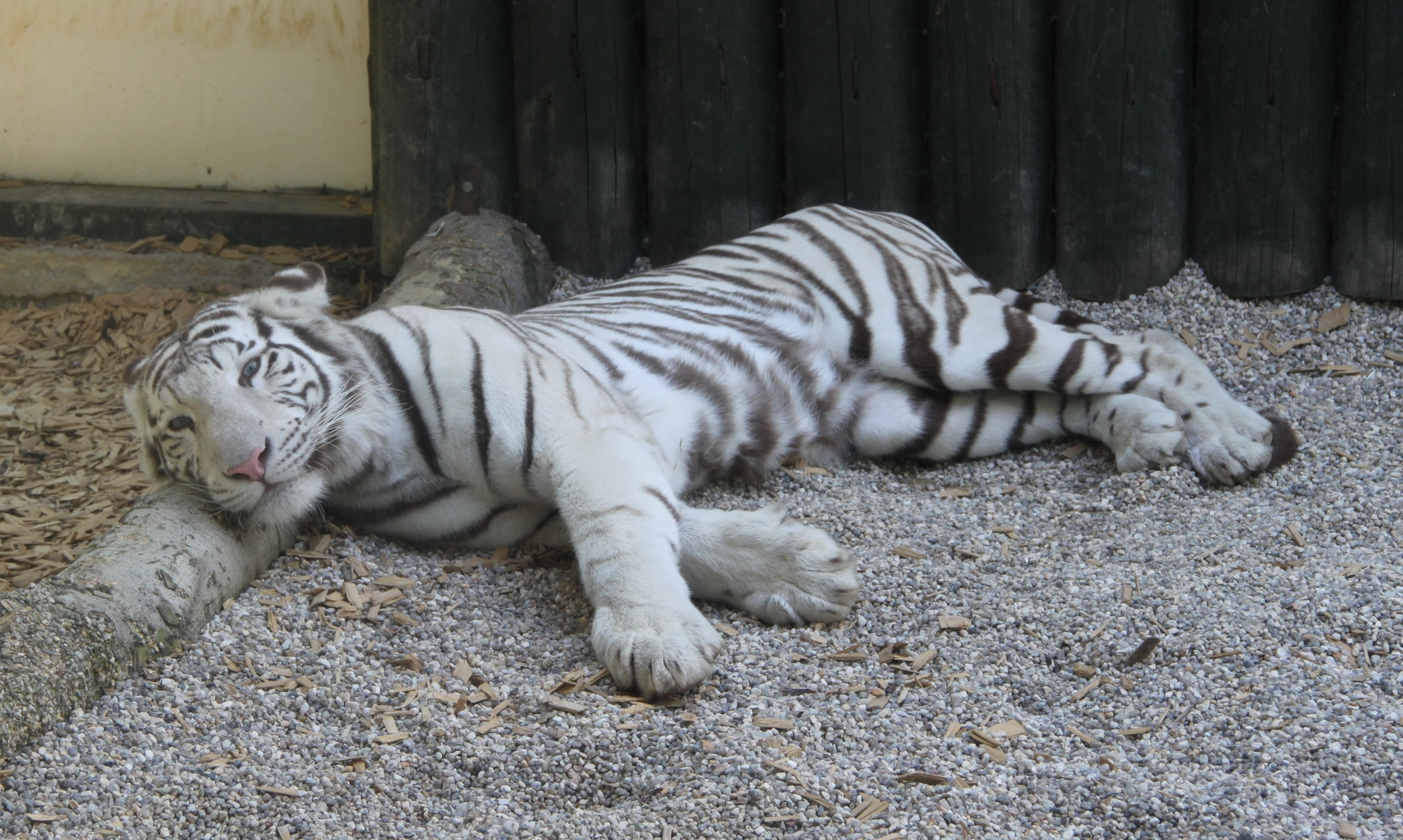
A White tiger in Liberec Zoo

== See also ==
- Black panther
- Black tiger
- Cat coat genetics
- Conservation genetics
- Golden tiger
- Inbreeding
- Inbreeding depression
- White horse
- White lion
- White panther
- White squirrel
- White Tiger (mythology)
