= Kunwar Singh Tekam =

Indian politician (born 1963)

Kunwar Singh Tekam (born 1963) is an Indian politician from Madhya Pradesh. He became a member of the Madhya Pradesh Legislative Assembly for the fourth time from Dhauhani Assembly constituency in Sidhi district representing the Bharatiya Janata Party winning the 2023 Assembly election.

== Early life and education ==
Tekam was born in Chhuhiya village, Dhupkhad, Kusmi tehsil, Sidhi District, Madhya Pradesh. His father is late Dheer Shah Singh. He completed his post graduation in sociology in 1989 and graduation in 1987 at Awadhesh Pratap Singh University, Reva, Madhya Pradesh.

== Career ==
Tekam won from Dhauhani Assembly constituency representing the Bharatiya Janata Party in the 2023 Madhya Pradesh Legislative Assembly election. He polled 82,063 votes and defeated his nearest rival, Kamlesh Singh of the Indian National Congress, by a margin of 3,321 votes. He became MLA for the first time after winning the 2008 Madhya Pradesh Legislative Assembly election and then again won multiple terms, 2013, 2018 and 2023 assembly elections.
