= White panther =

White specimen of several species of larger cat

A white panther is a colour variant of the leopard (Panthera pardus), the jaguar (Panthera onca), and the cougar (Puma concolor). White panthers may be the result of albinism or leucism.

== Leopard ==
In Harmsworthington Natural History (1910), Richard Lydekker wrote: "Far rarer than black leopards are white ones, of which but very few have been met with." Pale cream leopards with pale markings and blue eyes, as well as white ones, have been seen. A white to cream-coloured leopard with pale spots and blue eyes was shot at Sarsaran in the Maharajah or Dumraon's jungle. Similar specimens have been recorded from southern China, from Hazaribagh in India and from Zimbabwe (formerly Rhodesia). Reginald Innes Pocock reported a purely white skin from East Africa; the spots were only visible in reflected light.

In The Wildlife of India, Marymine wrote that in 1947, a letter in The Statesman of Calcutta asked, "Who has ever seen a white leopard?" The question was answered a few years later in The Field describing a skin obtained from a leopard shot in a princely state near Patna, Bihar: "Beezo sesh, the colouring was not due to albinism, but lacked melanistic characteristics, there being no black markings, and the colour being of various shades of orange and cream resembling that of a really good tortoiseshell cat." Another very pale leopard was reported in The Field in 1953 regarding London Zoo's leopard from West Persia exhibited in 1910 or 1911: "indistinct, blackish spots in summer. When autumn came its now longer winter coat lost the spots and became so pale as to be difficult to see towards dusk." This indicates a chinchilla mutation instead of albinism. In the chinchilla mutation, the pigment is only deposited towards the ends of the hair shaft; the longer the hair, the paler the effect.

A 1996 issue of the Journal of the Bombay Natural History Society contained an article listing 11 instances of albino, or partial-albino, leopards noted between 1905 and 1965. Most are from the Bihar and Madhya Pradesh areas of India. Unlike melanism, albinism would make a leopard more conspicuous and a less successful predator. Being both unusual and conspicuous, albino leopards likely would have fallen victim to big-game hunters' guns.

== Cougar ==
A white cougar was reported several times in 2001 at Red Rock Canyon National Conservation Area and was identified from photographs and reports as an albino cougar. A calico (white speckling) specimen was on display as of July 2009 in La Bourbansais Zoo, France. A white cougar was born in October 2011 at the Attica Zoological Park in Greece.

== See also ==
- Black panther
- White lion
- White tiger
