= Rampur Naikin =

Town in Madhya Pradesh, India

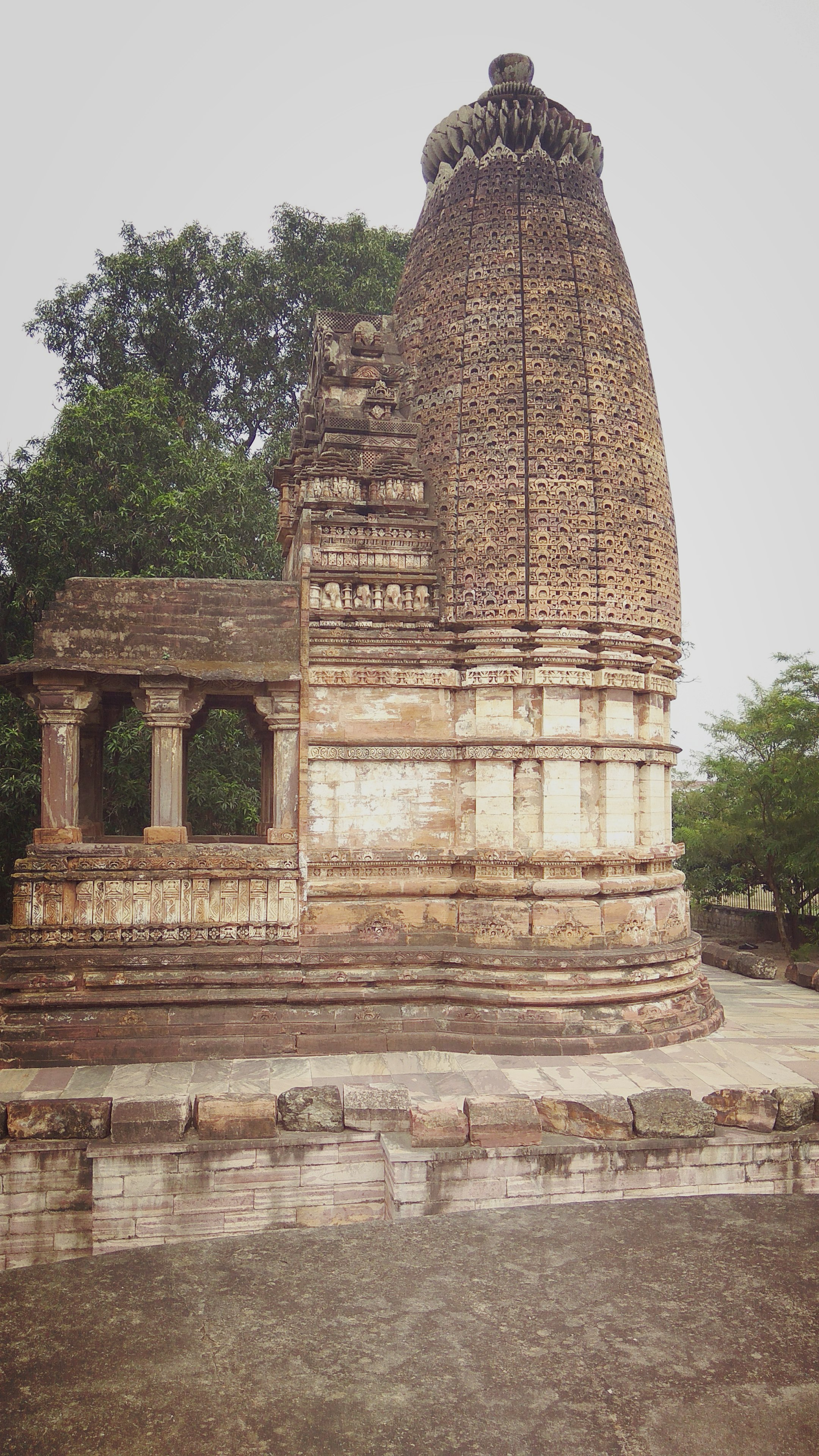
Chandreh Temple

Rampur Naikin is a city, municipal headquarters (Nagar Parisad) and a subdistrict of Sidhi district in the Indian state of Madhya Pradesh. In 2011 Rampur Naikin City had a population of 11,936.

The well-known Chandrehshvar Shiva temple, originating in the 10th century, is located here.

The town is also famous for a historical political campaign march of Indian National Congress, led by Dwarika Prasad Dubey (Nausa), the former president of Rampur Town Congress Committee and later held prominent positions of Sidhi as the Chairman of Sanchar Sankarm Samiti, Sidhi and also semi national and state level congress posts.
