= Madwas =

Town in Madhya Pradesh, India

- Town
- Location in Madhya Pradesh, India Madwas (India)
- Coordinates: 24.11°N 81.78°E
- Country: India
- State: Madhya Pradesh
- District: Sidhi

Population (2011)
  - Total: 5,661

Languages
  - Official: Hindi
- Time zone: UTC+5:30 (IST)
- ISO 3166 code: IN-MP
- Vehicle registration: MP 53
- Website: www.madwas.nic.in

Madwas is a major town and a railway station in Sidhi District of Madhya Pradesh, India. It's also a Tehsil Headquarter.

== History ==
The state of Balendu rulers (Chedi dynasty) was in Madwas. Madwas is known for its historical fort, which is associated with the Chandela rulers and is a significant landmark in the region.

== Geography ==
Madwas belongs to Rewa Division. It is located 55 km (34 mi) west of the district headquarters of Sidhi and 592 km (368 mi) from the state capital of Bhopal towards the east.

== Demographics ==
As of the 2011 Census of India, Madwas village had a population of 5,661, of which 2,943 were males and 2,718 were females. The average sex ratio of Madwas village is 924, which is lower than Madhya Pradesh state average of 931.

== Major trains ==
There is many major trains halting in madwas.

- Singrauli–Hazrat Nizamuddin Superfast Express
- Madan Mahal–Singrauli Intercity Express
- Bhopal–Singrauli Superfast Express
- Shaktipunj Express
- Katni-Bargawan Memu
