= Sidhi =

- Municipality
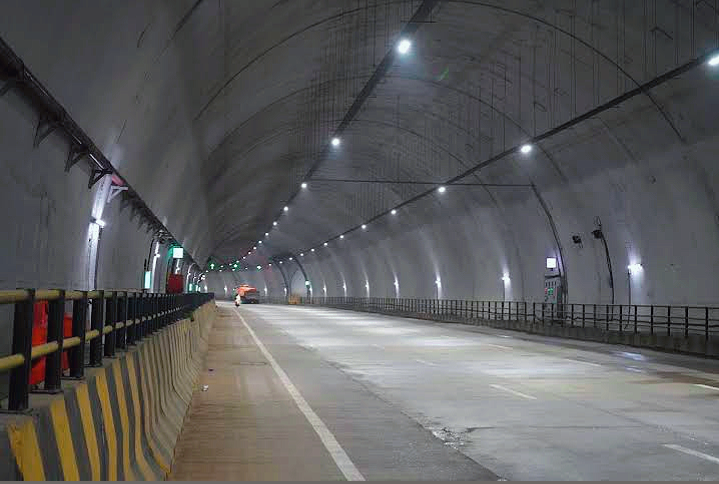
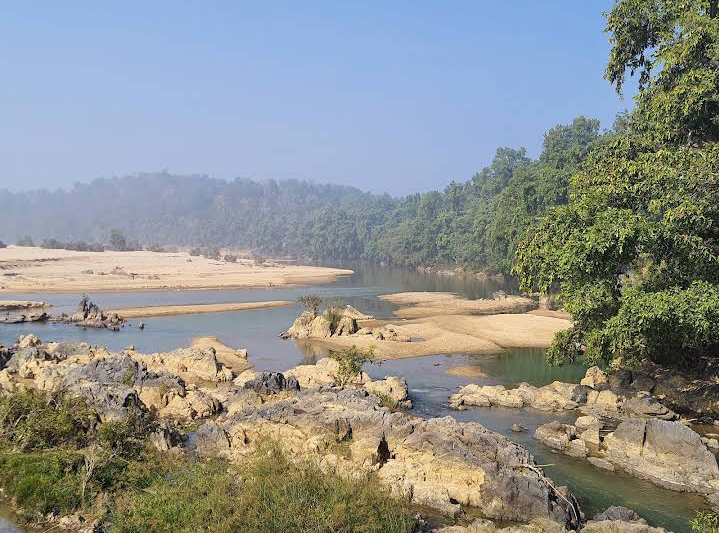
- Rewa-Sidhi Tunnel, Banas River Parsili

- Location in Madhya Pradesh, India Sidhi (India)
- Coordinates: 24.42°N 81.88°E
- Country: India
- State: Madhya Pradesh
- District: Sidhi
- Established: 1949
- Elevation: 272 m (892 ft)

Population (2011)
  - Total: 54,331

Languages
  - Official: Hindi
- Time zone: UTC+5:30 (IST)
- Postal code: 486661
- ISO 3166 code: IN-MP
- Vehicle registration: MP-53
- Website: sidhi.nic.in

Sidhi is a city and a municipality in Sidhi district in the Indian state of Madhya Pradesh. It is the headquarters of the Sidhi district. Sidhi is also known as the birth place of Birbal . An advisor of the Mughal Emperor Akbar and folk hero.

Sidhi is home to a vast number of nature reserves and parks; Sanjay Dubri National Park, (Tiger reserve) Son Ghariyal Sanctuary and the Son-Banas Sangam(River Junction). Situated near Chandreh, Sidhi is a starting point for pilgrims visiting Chandreh's Shiva Temple. The population of Sidhi District is 1,500,000 and the population of Sidhi City is 1,000,00. Sidhi is connected to National Highway No.39; Madhya Pradesh State Highway No.52; and Madhya Pradesh State Highway No.09.

== Geography ==
Sidhi is located at 24.42°N 81.88°E. It has an average elevation of 272 metres (892 feet) and covers a geographical area of It is a state of Chandela Rajputs who came from Khajuraho. They mainly live in Bardi State and then again divide into a few areas in Sidhi.

== Climate ==
Climate data for Sidhi (1991–2020, extremes 1958–2011)
Month	Jan	Feb	Mar	Apr	May	Jun	Jul	Aug	Sep	Oct	Nov	Dec	Year
Record high °C (°F)	32.8 (91.0)	37.4 (99.3)	42.2 (108.0)	48.8 (119.8)	46.6 (115.9)	47.4 (117.3)	43.2 (109.8)	39.2 (102.6)	39.0 (102.2)	39.6 (103.3)	36.4 (97.5)	34.6 (94.3)	48.8 (119.8)
Mean daily maximum °C (°F)	24.4 (75.9)	28.0 (82.4)	33.5 (92.3)	39.7 (103.5)	42.2 (108.0)	38.8 (101.8)	33.8 (92.8)	32.4 (90.3)	32.6 (90.7)	32.9 (91.2)	29.8 (85.6)	26.2 (79.2)	32.7 (90.9)
Mean daily minimum °C (°F)	8.5 (47.3)	11.7 (53.1)	16.3 (61.3)	22.0 (71.6)	26.8 (80.2)	27.6 (81.7)	26.0 (78.8)	25.3 (77.5)	24.3 (75.7)	20.3 (68.5)	14.4 (57.9)	9.0 (48.2)	19.2 (66.6)
Record low °C (°F)	0.8 (33.4)	2.0 (35.6)	4.6 (40.3)	11.8 (53.2)	17.0 (62.6)	20.0 (68.0)	17.0 (62.6)	17.4 (63.3)	18.2 (64.8)	12.0 (53.6)	4.0 (39.2)	1.0 (33.8)	0.8 (33.4)
Average rainfall mm (inches)	12.4 (0.49)	19.2 (0.76)	7.6 (0.30)	6.7 (0.26)	14.0 (0.55)	127.2 (5.01)	351.6 (13.84)	330.2 (13.00)	239.3 (9.42)	37.5 (1.48)	7.3 (0.29)	4.5 (0.18)	1,157.8 (45.58)
Average rainy days	1.3	1.3	0.9	0.8	1.4	7.2	14.6	15.0	9.7	1.6	0.5	0.1	54.4
Average relative humidity (%) (at 17:30 IST)	45	39	27	21	27	49	70	76	71	54	50	51	48
Source: India Meteorological Department

== Transportation ==
Closest Airport to Sidhi is in Rewa domestic airport which is 85 kilometers away and has connecting flights to major destinations such as Delhi, Bangaluru, Mumbai, Kolkata etc. Closest railway station is Madwas and Joba which is respectively 50 and 60 km away from the city.And New Railway station is under construction in Sidhi city. Sidhi district is connected to National Highway No.39, state highway 09, Rewa-Sidhi major Roots and Sidhi-Beohari State highways.

== Demographics ==
As of the 2001 India census, Sidhi had a population of 45,664 with males constituting 54% of the population, females 46%. Sidhi has an average literacy rate of 69%, higher than the national average of 59.5%: male literacy is 77%, and female literacy is 60%. In Sidhi, 15% of the population is under 6 years of age.

== Notable people ==
- Birbal (Mahesh Das), born in Ghoghra Sidhi, his career started in the court of Maharaja Ramchandra Singh of Rewa (princely state) before moving to Mughal Emperor Akbar's court.
- Arjun Singh, former CM of Madhya Pradesh, former Union Minister of Human Resource Development, former Governor of Punjab.
- Govind Mishra, Former Member of Parliament, Parliamentary Constituency No. 11 Sidhi
- Ajay Singh, former cabinet minister in Madhya Pradesh Govt., Leader of opposition; Member of Legislative Assembly, Assembly Constituency No. 11
- Dwarika Prasad Dubey (Nausa), Former Sabhapati of Jila Panchayat Sidhi, former MLA candidate, General secretary of Madhya Pradesh kisan congress comitee (MPCC)
- Rajesh Mishra, Member of Parliament, Parliamentary Constituency No. 11 Sidhi
- Riti Pathak, Member Of Legislative Assembly, Assembly Constituency No. 77
- Vishwamitra Pathak, Member Of Legislative Assembly, Assembly Constituency No. 78
- Ajay Pratap Singh, Former Member of Parliament, Rajya Sabha
- Arunoday Singh, Bollywood actor and son of Ajay Arjun Singh.
- Kunwar Singh Tekam, Former Chairman Of National Commission For Scheduled Tribes; Member Of Legislative Assembly Constituency No. 82 Dhauhani Madhya Pradesh
- Satish Agnihotri, Chief Justice of Sikkim, born in Rampur Naikin, and studied at Govt H S School Rampur Naikin.
