= Sidhi district =

- District of Madhya Pradesh
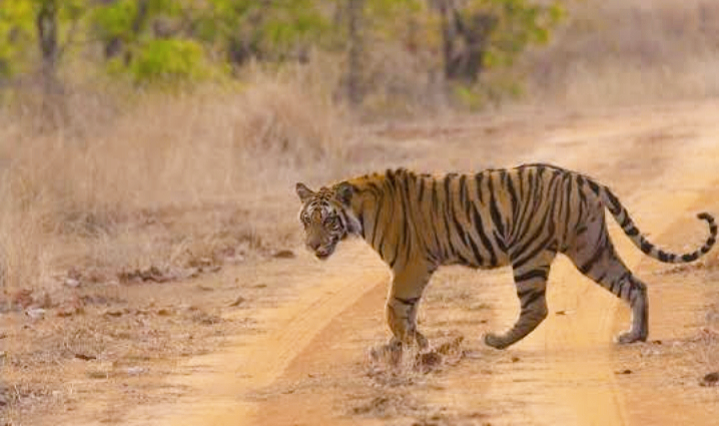
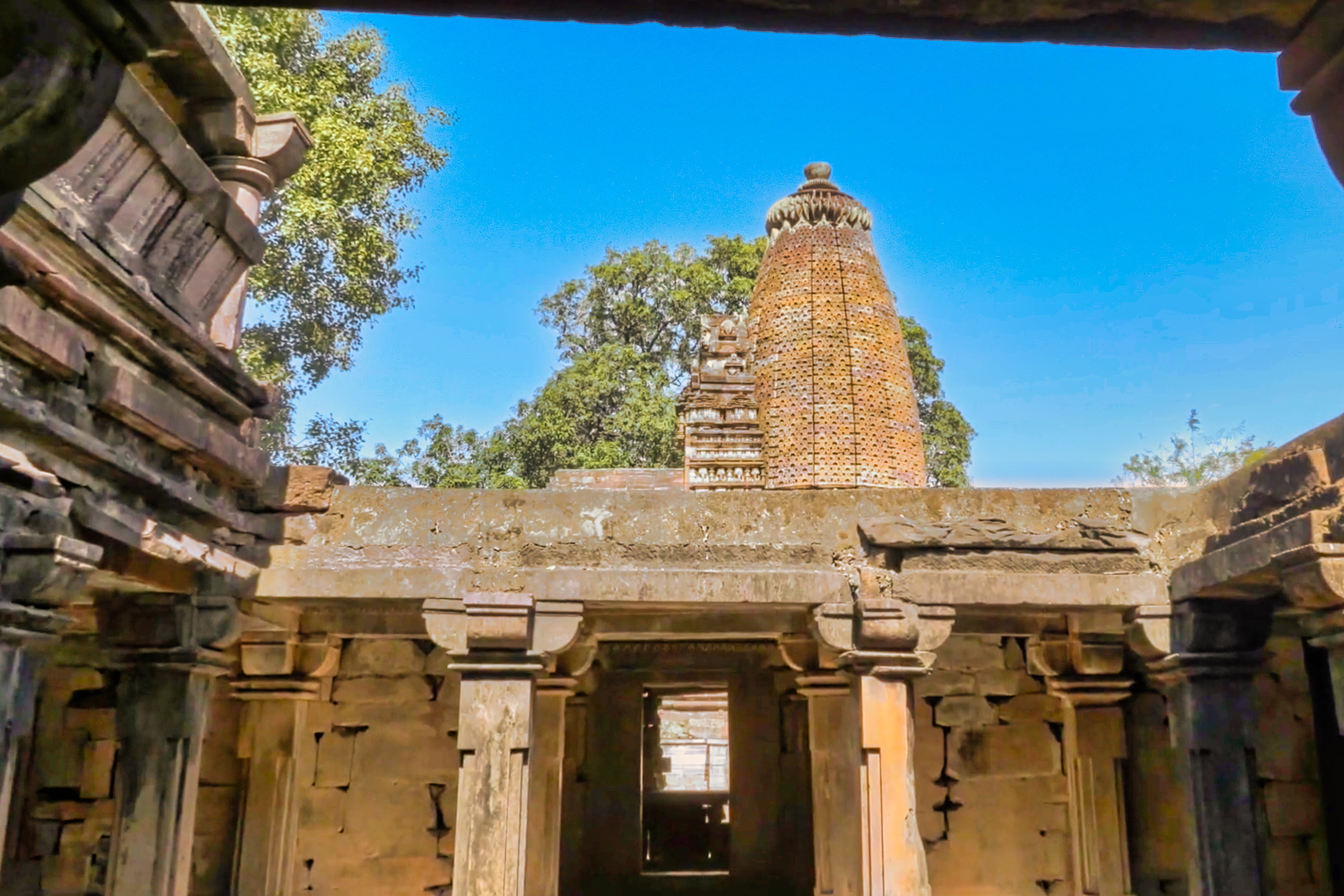
- Sanjay Dubri Tiger Reserve, Chandreh temple

- Location of Sidhi district in Madhya Pradesh
- Country: India
- State: Madhya Pradesh
- Division: Rewa
- Headquarters: Sidhi
- Tehsils: 8

Government
  - Lok Sabha constituencies: Sidhi

Area
  - Total: 4,851 km^{2} (1,873 sq mi)

Population (2011)
  - Total: 1,127,033
  - Density: 232.3/km^{2} (601.7/sq mi)
  - Urban: 93,121

Demographics
  - Literacy: 66.09per cent
  - Sex ratio: 952
- Time zone: UTC+05:30 (IST)
- Major highways: NH-75
- Average annual precipitation: normal mm
- Website: sidhi.nic.in

Sidhi district (Hindi pronunciation: [siːd̪ʱiː]) is one of the districts of Madhya Pradesh state of India. The town of Sidhi is the district headquarters. The district is part of Rewa Division.

== History ==
=== Rulers of Sidhi ===
In the 1800s, there were three separate rulers of Sidhi, ruling three parts of the territory:

- The Chandela rulers from Bardi (Khatai).
- The state of Balendu कुदरगढ़िन माता : छत्तीसगढ़ नवरात्रि विशेष – दक्षिण कोसल टुडे rulers (Chedi dynasty) was in Madwas.

After these came the Baghel Rajput from Kasauta (Shankargarh). They immigrated to Sidhi in the early 19th century. Over the centuries, as the Rewa (princely state) expanded, several cadet branches of the royal family were granted land estates or thikanas for administrative efficiency and military support. Churhat was one such prominent estate granted to a younger branch of the Baghela dynasty and the descendants of Rao Kandhar Dev, ancestor of the Raos of Kasauta (Shankargarh), who was the fifth son of Maharaja Vyaghradev Solanki of Rewa (princely state). The rulers of this estate held the hereditary title of Rao (Raja). They ruled the western Sidhi territory (Rampur Naikin area) from then on until India gained independence. The most prominent modern figure from this lineage was Rao Shiv Bahadur Singh, 26th Rao Sahib (Raja) of Churhat, he was granted the title of Raja as a personal distinction, and has served as minister in the Central cabinet under Jawaharlal Nehru.

His son, Arjun Singh (Congress politician), became one of the most influential political stalwarts in modern Indian history. He served as the Chief Minister of Madhya Pradesh on multiple occasions, the Union Minister of Human Resource Development, and the Governor of Punjab during a critical period in the mid-1980s. Today, his descendants, including his son Ajay Arjun Singh (popularly known as Rahul Bhaiya), continue to represent the region in the state legislature, maintaining the family's deep-rooted connection to the people of Churhat and grandson Arunoday Singh is a famous Indian actor.

Presently Rao RAN BAHADUR SINGH, 27th Rao Sahib (Raja) of Churhat since 1955, who married Rani Krishna Kumari, daughter of HH Raja Dileep Singh of Jhabua. Rao Ran Bahadur Singh is the elder brother of Arjun Singh.

Ambikehs Pratap Singh (Chhote Sarkar odani), who was the younger brother of raja Tryambkesh Pratap Singh Bardi khatai, is a senior leader of the Madhyapradesh congress.

Raja Kant Deo Singh of Bardi Khatai continues to live in the ancestral Haveli located on the banks of the Sone River. He is an active member of the Bharatiya Janata PartySidhi is a part of Madhya Pradesh. Sidhi is known for its natural environment, historical importance and cultural roots. Sidhi has a number of natural resources with the Sone River draining the district.

Sidhi is the birthplace of Birbal, and his career started in the court of Maharaja Ramchandra Singh of Rewa (princely state) before moving to Mughal Emperor Akbar's court. Located in the area is the Sanjay Tiger Reserve or Sanjay National Park that tells the magnificence of the white tiger birthplace there. There is also a park, Parsili.

== Divisions ==
- Sidhi district comprises eight tehsils: Bahari, Churhat, Gopad Banas, Rampur Naikin, Majhauli, Kusmi, Sihawal, and Madwas.
- There are four Madhya Pradesh Vidhan Sabha constituencies in this district, namely Churhat, Sidhi, Sihawal, and Dhauhani, all of which are part of Sidhi Lok Sabha constituency.
- Apart from Sidhi, there are the three other municipal councils in the district: Rampur Naikin, Majhauli, and Churhat.

== Economy ==
The Aditya birla group cement plant over a wide area. On one side the spectrum of its floristic socio-cultural diversity and ethnic history of tribal, the district has a panoramic view of the Kaimur, Kehejua, and Ranimunda hills blazing with flowers of flame in the forest and intoxicated by the sweet smell of mahua flowers. The whole Sidhi district was a part of the Rewa state. The economy of this area is mainly based on agriculture and allied activities.

In 2006, the Ministry of Panchayati Raj named Sidhi one of the country's 250 most backward districts (out of a total of 640). It is one of the 24 districts in Madhya Pradesh currently receiving funds from the Backward Regions Grant Fund Programme (BRGF).

== Geography ==
Sidhi district is located on the Northeastern Boundary of the state between 22,475 and 24.4210 North Latitude and 81:1840 and 824830 east longitude. The district has Singrauli district in the northeast, the Koriya district of Chhattisgarh on the southeast, Maihar district in west, and Rewa district on the northwest.

In 2024, Sidhi district has a total population of approximately 1,500,000 and Sidhi city's population is approximately 100,000, sharing almost 3.03% of the total population of former state of Madhya Pradesh in 2001.

== Transportation ==
In town public facilities are easily available like an auto rickshaw, bus, or taxi, but there has been no available online public transport services since 2023. The district currently does not have its own railway station. The nearest railway is the Rewa railway station, Madwas or Joba railway station. Online couriers service are available. One runway is also present at Panwar in the Sidhi district (13 km away).The closest airport to Sidhi is in Rewa and is 91 kilometers away.

== Demographics ==
Historical population
Year	Pop.	±% p.a.
1901	180,233	—
1911	209,968	+1.54%
1921	180,804	−1.48%
1931	207,401	+1.38%
1941	243,103	+1.60%
1951	266,111	+0.91%
1961	332,774	+2.26%
1971	440,669	+2.85%
1981	532,098	+1.90%
1991	709,436	+2.92%
2001	910,983	+2.53%
2011	1,127,033	+2.15%

Religions in Sidhi district (2011)
Religion	Percent
Hinduism	95.61%
Islam	3.05%
Other (tribal)	1.11%
Other or not stated	0.23%

According to the 2011 census, Sidhi District has a population of 1,127,033, roughly equal to the nation of Cyprus or the U.S. state of Rhode Island. This gives it a ranking of 411th in India (out of a total of 640). The district has a population density of 232 inhabitants per square kilometre (600/sq mi). Its population growth rate over the decade 2001-2011 was 23.66%. Sidhi has a sex ratio of 952 females for every 1000 males, and a literacy rate of 66.09%. 8.26% of the population lives in urban areas. Scheduled castes and tribes made up 11.55% and 27.80% of the population respectively.

=== Languages ===
Languages of Sidhi district (2011)
1. Hindi (63.4%)
2. Bagheli (35.6%)
3. Others (0.96%)

At the time of the 2011 Census of India, 63.39% of the population in the district spoke Hindi, 35.65% spoke Bagheli, and 0.79% spoke Gondi as their first language.

== Education ==
In 1980, at the time when Arjun Singh was the chief minister of Madhya Pradesh, a committee was formed to find out more about the educational system in Sidhi district. It was tasked to find out which was the first school in Sidhi district, and who was the first graduate.

It was popularly thought that Rajasahab Madhwas was the first graduate from Sidhi. The survey further revealed that Shri Divakar Bahadur Singh, from the village Jhalwar (Churhat), was the first graduate from Allahabad University. He had done his BA in 1924 and had proceeded to do his LLB also from Allahabd University in 1926. Thereafter he had come back to practice and settle in Jhalwar (Churaht) in Sidhi district. His successors are still present in Jhalwar.

It was also found that the first school in Sidhi was in Bardi. This school had started around 100 years before the survey, around the year 1880.

== Notable people ==
- Ajay Pratap Singh, former Member of Parliament, Rajya Sabha
- Birbal (Mahesh Das) born in Village Ghoghra, Sidhi, his career started in the court of Maharaja Ramchandra Singh of Rewa (princely state) before moving to Mughal Emperor Akbar's court.
- Arjun Singh, former CM of Madhya Pradesh, former Union Minister of Human Resource Development, former Governor of Punjab
- Ajay Singh, MLA of Churhat constituency, member of the Indian National Congress party, former cabinet minister in Madhya Pradesh govt, former leader of opposition of Madhya Pradesh Legislative Assembly.
- Dwarika Prasad Dubey, MLA candidate of Indian National Congress, 1998 Gopad Banas Sidhi, All India Congress Committee statesman, former sabhapati of Jila Panchayat Sidhi, current General secretary of Madhya Pradesh Congress Committee
- Riti Pathak, member of Legislative Assembly, Assembly Constituency No. 77, former member of Parliament, Parliamentary Constituency No. 11 Sidhi
- Rajesh Mishra, member of Parliament, Parliament Constituency No. 11 Sidhi and former district Bharatiya Janata Party president
- Kumar singh Tekam, member of the Legislative Assembly, Assembly Constituency No. 82 Dhauhani, former chairman of National Commission for Scheduled Tribes, Government of India, New Delhi
- Arunoday Singh, Indian film actor
- Rohit Singh, environmentalist currently working with Biodiversity Foundation as a Scientific Supervisor at Tughlakabad Biodiversity Park, a central government project
- Pushpraj Singh, lawyer currently practicing at supreme court of India

== Tourist places ==
Tourist places:

- Sanjay National Park: A popular destination for tiger safaris and wildlife viewing.
- Chandreh Shiva temple and Monastery: A religious site with historical and architectural significance.
- Parsili rest house: Located near the Majhauli Tehsil, offering a scenic view of the area.
- Bagdara Wildlife Sanctuary: Another nature and wildlife area offering opportunities to explore the local flora and fauna.
- Shikarganj rest house: A confluence of Sone river and Banas river.
- Son Gharial Sanctuary: A sanctuary dedicated to the conservation of gharials.
- Ghonghra temple: The village where Birbal (Mahesh Das) was born.
- Turra waterfall: A significant and beautiful waterfall.
