= Political families of Madhya Pradesh =

List of Indian political families based in Madhya Pradesh

Madhya Pradesh

The Political families of Madhya Pradesh are a group of older families that exert considerable influence throughout the region.

== The Rewa Royal Family ==
- Maharaja Martand Singh Ju Deo Bahadur, former member of parliament from Rewa, former Rajpramukh of Vindhya Pradesh
  - Pushpraj Singh Son of Maharaja Martand Singh Ju Deo Bahadur and former minister of education of Madhya Pradesh state
    - Divyaraj Singh(Son of Pushparaj Singh), three time elected Member of the Madhya Pradesh Legislative Assembly, representing Sirmour Assembly constituency

== The (Rajput) Families ==
- Rao Shiv Bahadur Singh of Churhat thikana was in the Central cabinet under Pt. Jawaharlal Nehru.
  - Arjun Singh (Son of Rao Shiv Bahadur Singh) Former Union HRD Minister and Former Chief Minister of Madhya Pradesh
    - Ajay Arjun Singh (Son of Arjun Singh) aka Rahul Bhaiya Ex Cabinet Minister MP, Ex Leader of Opposition
      - Arunoday Singh (Son of Ajay Singh) Film Actor in Bollywood.

- Awadhesh Pratap Singh, former Prime Minister of Rewa State and First Chief Minister of Vindhya Pradesh
  - Govind Narayan Singh (Son of Awadesh Pratap Singh) Former Chief Minister of Madhya Pradesh
    - Harsh Singh (Son of Govind Narayan Singh) cabinet minister under Shivraj Singh Chouhan
      - Vikram Singh (Son of Harsh Singh) MLA from Rampur Baghelan

- Balbhadra Singh, MLA from Vidhan Sabha constituency
  - Digvijaya Singh, 15th Chief Minister of Madhya Pradesh
    - Jaivardhan Singh, son of MLA from Vidhan Sabha constituency
  - Lakshman Singh, MLA from Vidhan Sabha constituency

- Kaushalendra Pratap Singh Ju Deo, former Member of the Legislative Assembly (MLA) representing the Kothi constituency in Vindhya Pradesh from 1952 to 1956, and the erstwhile ruler of Kothi State, Satna.

== The Scindia Family (former Maharajas) (mother-son and daughters-grandsons) ==
- Rajmata Vijayraje Scindia, BJP
  - Madhavrao Scindia, son of Vijayaraje INC
    - Jyotiraditya Scindia, son of Madhavrao
  - Vasundhara Raje Scindia, daughter of Vijayaraje
    - Dushyant Singh, son of Vasundhara Raje
  - Yashodhara Raje Scindia, daughter of Vijayaraje

Connected Member

- Pashupati Shamsher Jang Bahadur Rana, son-in-law of Vijayraje Scindia, ex-minister of Nepal, grandson of Maharaja Mohan Shamsher Jang Bahadur Rana

== The Chaturvedi (Chaudhary) family ==
- Chaudhary Dilip Singh Chaturvedi, MLA from Bhind
  - Chaudhary Rakesh Singh Chaturvedi (son) former cabinet minister, former leader of opposition, MLA from Bhind
  - Chaudhary Mukesh Singh Chaturvedi (son) MLA from Mehgaon

Connected members

- Ravishankar Shukla, former Chief Minister of Madhya Pradesh
  - Shyama Charan Shukla, former Chief Minister of Madhya Pradesh
  - Vidya Charan Shukla, minister in Indira Gandhi's cabinet

== The Nagori family of Rajasthan State ==
- Mohd. Anwar Nagori, Son Of Mohd. Ismail Nagori, MLA from Ujjain
  - Qayyum Nagori, son of Mohd. Ismail Nagori, Central Minister Delegate from Nagor

== Bhuria family ==
- Dileep Singh Bhuria, MP from Ratlam
  - Nirmala Bhuria, MLA from Petlawad
- Kantilal Bhuria, MP from Ratlam

== Chaturvedi family ==
- Vidyawati Chaturvedi, MLA from Laundi Vidhan Sabha constituency
  - Satyavrat Chaturvedi, son of Vidyawati Chaturvedi and MP of Rajya Sabha
- Alok Chaturvedi, MLA from Chhatarpur Vidhan Sabha constituency

== Nath family ==
- Kamal Nath, 18th Chief Minister of Madhya Pradesh
  - Nakul Nath, Member of parliament from Chhindwara
- Alka Nath, Ex member of parliament from Chhindwara

== Vajpayee family ==
- Atal Bihari Vajpayee, 10th Prime Minister of India
  - Karuna Shukla, niece of Atal Bihari, member of the 14th Lok Sabha of India
