= Chhindwara Lok Sabha constituency =

Lok Sabha constituency in Madhya Pradesh, India

Coordinates: 22.07°N 78.93°E

Chhindwara
- Lok Sabha constituency
- Interactive Map Outlining Chhindwara Lok Sabha constituency

Constituency details
- Country: India
- Region: Central India
- State: Madhya Pradesh
- Assembly constituencies: Junnardeo; Amarwara; Chourai; Saunsar; Chhindwara; Parasia; Pandhurna
- Established: 1951
- Total electors: 16,32,190
- Reservation: None

Member of Parliament
- 18th Lok Sabha
- Incumbent Vivek Kumar Sahu
- Party: BJP
- Elected year: 2024

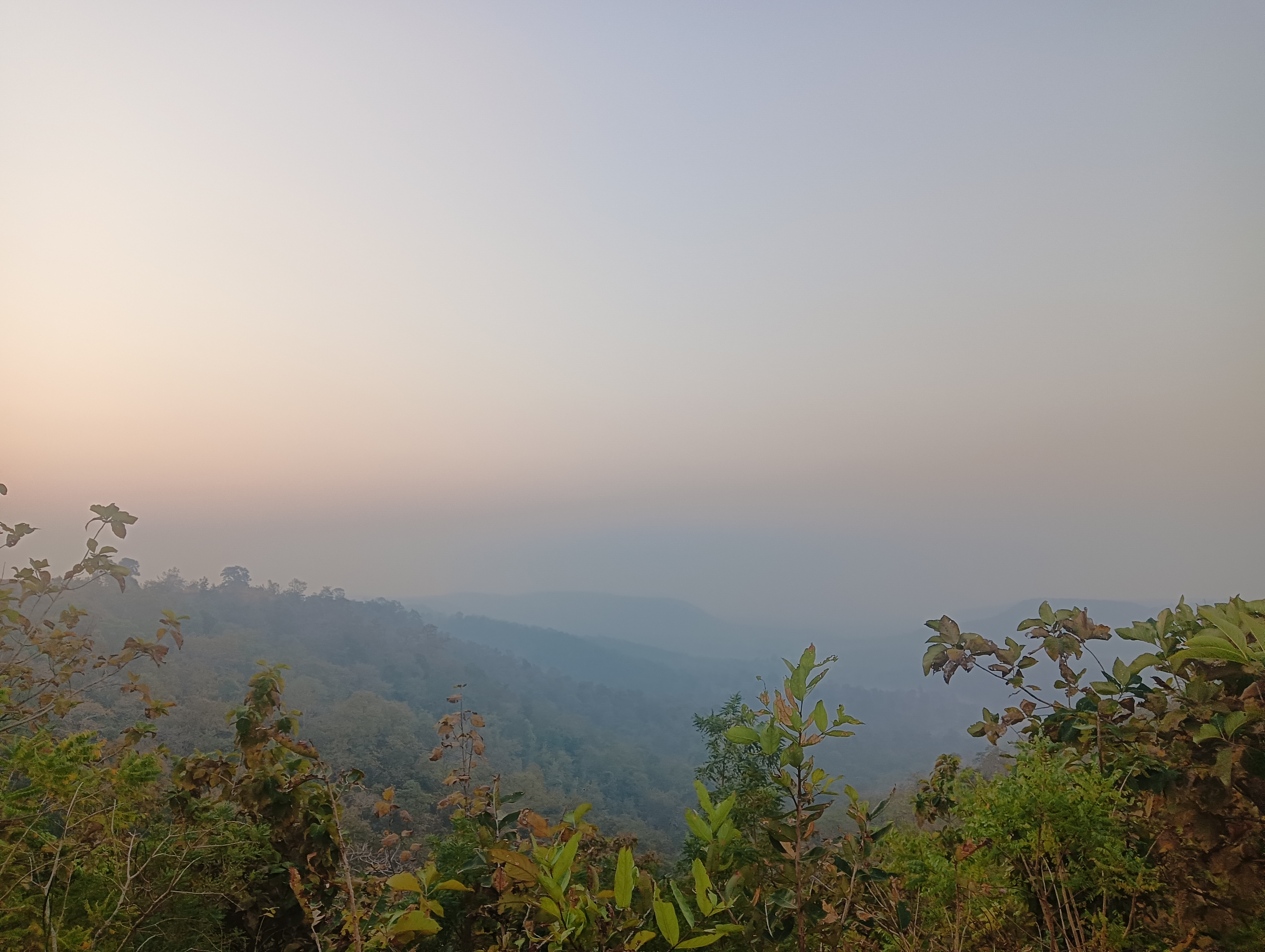
A scenic view of mountains as seen from the outskirts of Batkajhiri Village Chhindwara

Chhindwara is one of the 29 Lok Sabha constituencies in Madhya Pradesh state in Central India. This constituency came into existence in 1951, and it presently covers the entire Chhindwara district and Pandhurna district.

== Assembly segments ==
Most Lok Sabha seats in MP and Chhattisgarh, with few seats like Durg (which has nine assembly segments under it) being exceptions, have 8 assembly seats as their segments. This seat is among the exceptions. Chhindwara and Satna have 7 assembly segments under them. Chhindwara Lok Sabha constituency comprises the following seven Vidhan Sabha (Legislative Assembly) segments:

#	Name	District	Member	Party	2024 Lead
122	Junnardeo (ST)	Chhindwara	Sunil Uikey	INC	BJP
123	Amarwara (ST)	Chhindwara	Kamlesh Shah	BJP	BJP
124	Chourai	Chhindwara	Choudhary Sujeet Mersingh	INC	BJP
125	Sausar	Chhindwara	Vijay Revnath Chore	INC	BJP
126	Chhindwara	Chhindwara	Kamal Nath	INC	BJP
127	Parasiya (SC)	Chhindwara	Sohanlal Valmik	INC	BJP
128	Pandhurna (ST)	Chhindwara	Neelesh Uikey	INC	BJP

== Members of Parliament ==
Year	Member	Party
1952	Raichandbhai Shah	Indian National Congress
1957	Raichandbhai Shah	Indian National Congress
1962	Raichandbhai Shah	Indian National Congress
1967	Raichandbhai Shah	Indian National Congress
1971	Raichandbhai Shah	Indian National Congress
1977	Kamal Nath	Indian National Congress
1980	Kamal Nath	Indian National Congress
1984	Kamal Nath	Indian National Congress
1989	Kamal Nath	Indian National Congress
1991	Kamal Nath	Indian National Congress
1996	Kamal Nath	Indian National Congress
1997^	Sunder Lal Patwa	Indian National Congress
1998	Kamal Nath	Indian National Congress
1999	Kamal Nath	Indian National Congress
2004	Kamal Nath	Indian National Congress
2009	Kamal Nath	Indian National Congress
2014	Kamal Nath	Indian National Congress
2019	Kamal Nath	Indian National Congress
2024	Vivek Kumar Sahu	Bharatiya Janata Party

Indian National Congress is the most successful political party in Chhindwara Lok Sabha elections.
1. INC (17 terms) (89.5%)
2. BJP (2 terms) (10.5%)
Kamal Nath is the most frequently elected Member of Parliament from Chhindwara.
1. Kamal Nath (9 terms) (47.4%)
2. Gargi Shankar Mishra (3 terms) (15.8%)
3. Bhikulal Chandak (2 terms) (10.5%)
4. Others (5 terms) (26.3%)

^ by poll

== Election results ==
=== 2024 ===
2024 Indian general election: Chhindwara
Party	Candidate	Votes	%	±%
BJP	Vivek Kumar Sahu	644,738	49.41	+5.36
INC	Nakul Nath	5,31,120	40.70	−6.34
GGP	Deviram Bhalavi	55,988	4.29	+4.09
NOTA	None of the above	9,903	0.76	−0.87
Majority		1,13,618	8.71	+5.70
Turnout		13,04,827	79.83	−2.59
BJP gain from INC		Swing		

=== 2019 ===
2019 Indian general elections: Chhindwara
Party	Candidate	Votes	%	±%
INC	Nakul Nath	547,305	47.06	−3.48
BJP	Nathan Shah	5,09,769	44.05	+4.04
ABGP	Manmohan Shah Batti	35,968	2.88	new
BSP	Gyaneshwar Gajbhiye	14,275	1.14	+0.03
GGP	Rajkumar Saryam	4,706	0.38	−1.93
NOTA	None of the Above	20,324	1.63	−0.67
Majority		37,536	3.00	−7.53
Turnout		12,48,478	82.42	+3.43
INC hold		Swing	-7.53	

=== 2014 Indian general election ===
2014 Indian general elections: Chhindwara
Party	Candidate	Votes	%	±%
INC	Kamal Nath	559,755	50.54	+1.13
BJP	Ch. Chandrabhan Kuber Singh	4,43,218	40.01	+5.22
GGP	Pardeshi Hartapshah Tirgam	25,628	2.31	new
Independent	Sitaram Sareyam	12,762	1.15	new
BSP	Nitin Kumar Sahu	12,241	1.11	−0.08
NOTA	None of the Above	25,499	2.30	N/A
Majority		1,16,537	10.53	−4.09
Turnout		11,07,498	78.99	+7.14
INC hold		Swing	-2.04	

=== 2009 Indian general election ===
2009 Indian general elections: Chhindwara
Party	Candidate	Votes	%	±%
INC	Kamal Nath	409,736	49.41	+8.52
BJP	Marot Rao Khavase	2,88,516	34.79	+2.34
Independent	Manmohan Shah Batti	27,414	3.31	new
Independent	Tulsiram Suryawanshi	21,211	2.56	new
BSP	Rao Saheb Shinde	9,880	1.19	new
Majority		1,21,220	14.62	+6.18
Turnout		8,29,294	71.85	+5.93
INC hold		Swing		

=== 2004 Indian general election ===
2004 Indian general elections: Chhindwara
Party	Candidate	Votes	%	±%
INC	Kamal Nath	308,563	40.89	−23.09
BJP	Prahlad Singh Patel	2,44,855	32.45	−1.3
Majority		63,708	8.44	−21.26
Turnout		7,52,439	65.92	+5.61
INC hold		Swing		

=== 1999 Indian general election ===
1999 Indian general election: Chhindwara
Party	Candidate	Votes	%	±%
INC	Kamal Nath	399,904	63.98	+6.88
BJP	Santosh Jain	2,10,976	33.75	−1.75
Majority		1,88,928	29.7	+8.1
Turnout		6,36,741	60.31	−10.20
INC hold		Swing		

=== 1998 Indian general election ===
1998 Indian general election: Chhindwara
Party	Candidate	Votes	%	±%
INC	Kamal Nath	406,249	57.1	+11.35
BJP	Sunder Lal Patwa	2,52,851	35.5	−15.87
Majority		153,398	21.6	+15.98
Turnout			70.51	+3.22
INC gain from BJP		Swing		

=== By election, 1997 ===
By Election, 1997: Chhindwara
Party	Candidate	Votes	%	±%
BJP	Sunder Lal Patwa	344,302	51.37	+11.37
INC	Kamal Nath	3,06,622	45.75	+2.61
JP	I. S. Chauhan	4,151	0.62	new
Independent	Vijay Singh Baghel	3,210	0.48	new
Independent	Dilip Parsram	2,972	0.44	new
Majority		37,680	5.62	+2.48
Turnout		6,70,220	67.29	+3.2
BJP gain from INC		Swing		

=== 1996 Indian general election ===
1996 Indian general election: Chhindwara
Party	Candidate	Votes	%	±%
INC	Alka Nath	281,414	43.14	−12.84
BJP	Chandrabhan Singh Chaudhary	2,60,032	40	+4.81
Majority		21,382	3.14	−17.65
Turnout			64.09	+17.47
INC hold		Swing		

=== 1991 Indian general election ===
1991 Indian general election: Chhindwara
Party	Candidate	Votes	%	±%
INC	Kamal Nath	214,456	55.98	+5.84
BJP	Chandrabhan Singh Chaudhary	1,34,824	35.19	new
Majority		79,632	20.79	+11.3
Turnout			46.62	−6.79
INC hold		Swing		

=== 1989 Indian general election ===
1989 Indian general election: Chhindwara
Party	Candidate	Votes	%	±%
INC	Kamal Nath	211,799	50.14	−16.97
JD	Madhav Lal Dube	1,71,695	40.65	new
Majority		40,104	9.49	−34.51
Turnout			53.41	4.41
INC hold		Swing		

=== 1984 Indian general election ===
1984 Indian general election: Chhindwara
Party	Candidate	Votes	%	±%
INC	Kamal Nath	234,846	67.17	+15.58
BJP	Batra Ram Kishan	81,021	23.17	new
Majority		153,825	44	−20.7
Turnout			57.82	+4.92
INC hold		Swing		

=== 1980 Indian general election ===
1980 Indian general election: Chhindwara
Party	Candidate	Votes	%	±%
INC	Kamal Nath	147,779	51.59	N/A
JP	Pratul Chandra Dwivedi	77,648	27.11	N/A
Majority		70,131	23.3	N/A
Turnout		3,00,998	52.9	N/A
INC hold		Swing		

== See also ==
- Chhindwara district
- List of constituencies of the Lok Sabha
