= Rampur-Baghelan Assembly constituency =

Assembly constituency in Madhya Pradesh

Coordinates: 24.51°N 81.06°E

Rampur-Baghelan
- Constituency No. 67 for the Madhya Pradesh Legislative Assembly

Constituency details
- Country: India
- Region: Central India
- State: Madhya Pradesh
- District: Satna
- Lok Sabha constituency: Satna
- Established: 1951
- Reservation: None

Member of Legislative Assembly
- 16th Madhya Pradesh Legislative Assembly
- Incumbent Vikram Singh
- Party: Bharatiya Janata Party
- Elected year: 2023
- Preceded by: Harsh Singh

Rampur-Baghelan Assembly constituency is one of the 230 Vidhan Sabha (Legislative Assembly) constituencies of Madhya Pradesh state in central India. This constituency came into existence in 1951, as one of the 48 Vidhan Sabha constituencies of the erstwhile Vindhya Pradesh state. This constituency was abolished in 1961 but came into existence again in 1966.

== Overview ==
Rampur-Baghelan (constituency number 67) is one of the 7 Vidhan Sabha constituencies located in Satna district. This constituency covers the entire Rampur-Baghelan tehsil and part of Amarpatan tehsil of the district.

Rampur-Baghelan is part of Satna Lok Sabha constituency along with six other Vidhan Sabha segments of this district, namely, Chitrakoot, Raigaon, Satna, Nagod, Maihar and Amarpatan.

== Members of Legislative Assembly ==
=== Vindhya Pradesh Legislative Assembly ===
Year	Member	Party
1952	Govind Narayan Singh	Indian National Congress

=== Madhya Pradesh Legislative Assembly ===
Election	Name	Party
1957	Govind Narayan Singh	Indian National Congress
1967	Govind Narayan Singh	Indian National Congress
1972	Toshan Singh	Samyukta Socialist Party
1977	Prabhakar Singh	Janata Party
1980	Harsh Singh	Indian National Congress (Indira)
1985	Harsh Singh	Indian National Congress
1990	Toshan Singh	Janata Dal
1993	Ramlakhan Singh Patel	Bahujan Samaj Party
1998	Prabhakar Singh	Bharatiya Janata Party
2003	Harsh Singh	Rashtriya Samanta Dal
2008	Ramlakhan Singh Patel	Bahujan Samaj Party
2013	Harsh Singh	Bharatiya Janata Party
2018	Vikram Singh	Bharatiya Janata Party
2023	Vikram Singh	Bharatiya Janata Party

== Election results ==
=== 2023 ===
2023 Madhya Pradesh Legislative Assembly election: Rampur-Baghelan
Party	Candidate	Votes	%	±%
BJP	Vikram Singh	85,287	43.66	+5.2
INC	Ramshankar Payasi	62,706	32.1	+8.35
BSP	Maniraj Singh	38,113	19.51	−10.18
NOTA	None of the above	1,265	0.65	+0.32
Majority		22,581	11.56	+2.79
Turnout		195,351	74.11	−1.04
BJP hold		Swing		

=== 2018 ===
2018 Madhya Pradesh Legislative Assembly election: Rampur-Baghelan
Party	Candidate	Votes	%	±%
BJP	Vikram Singh	68,816	38.46	
BSP	Ramlakhan Singh Patel	53,129	29.69	
INC	Ramshankar Payasi	42,501	23.75	
CPI(M)	K. K. Shukla	1,948	1.09	
Independent	Ashok Bauddh	1,736	0.97	
NOTA	None of the above	590	0.33	
Majority		15,687	8.77	
Turnout		178,948	75.15	
BJP hold		Swing		

== See also ==
- Rampur Baghelan
