= Damua Assembly constituency =

Former Madhya Pradesh Legislative Assembly constituency

Damua
- Former constituency for the Madhya Pradesh Legislative Assembly

Constituency details
- Country: India
- Region: Central India
- State: Madhya Pradesh
- Division: Jabalpur
- District: Chhindwara
- Lok Sabha constituency: Chhindwara
- Established: 1961
- Abolished: 2008
- Reservation: ST

Damua Assembly constituency was a Madhya Pradesh Legislative Assembly constituency in Chhindwara district, Madhya Pradesh, India.

== Boundaries ==
In the 1961 Delimitation, the constituency comprised Saori R.I.C, Jamai R.I.C. (excluding patwari circ1 Nos. 29 and 36 to 38) and Damua R. I. C. (exclding patwari circles Nos. 31, 35 and 53) Chhindwara tahsil. The constituency numbere was 200 and came under the Chhindwara Lok Sabha constituency.

In the 1967 Delimitation, the constituency comprised Damua and Pagara RICs and PCs 16 to 24 and 28 in Jamai RIC in Chhindwara tahsil. The constituency numbere 202 and came under the Betul Lok Sabha constituency.

In the 1976 Delimitation, the constituency comprised Damua and Pagara RICs. in Chhindwara tahsil and the forest villages in the area. The constituency numbere 217 and came again under the Chhindwara Lok Sabha constituency.

From its inception in 1961 till its abolition in 2008 it was reserved for ST members.

== Members of the Legislative Assembly ==
Year	Con. No.	Res.	Member	Party
1962	200	ST	Parasram Shivram Dhurve	Indian National Congress
1967	202	ST	P. Dhurve	Indian National Congress
1972	202	ST	Rajkumari Gyanda	Indian National Congress
1977	217	ST	Mandir Sa	Indian National Congress
1980	217	ST	Parasram Dhurve	Indian National Congress (I)
1985	217	ST	Anusuiya Uikey	Indian National Congress
1990	217	ST	Kamla Wadiva	Bharatiya Janata Party
1993	217	ST	Parasram Dhruve	Indian National Congress
1998	217	ST	Harishankar Uike	Indian National Congress
2003	217	ST	Jhanaklal Thakur	Bharatiya Janata Party

== Election results ==
=== 2003 ===
2003 Madhya Pradesh Legislative Assembly election : Damua
Party	Candidate	Votes	%	±%
BJP	Jhanaklal Thakur	41,039	45.44	
INC	Mahesh Kumar Sallam	30,320	33.57	
GGP	Fag Lal Kavreti	9,705	10.75	
Independent	Bisanlal Uikey	4,564	5.05	
Independent	Judhiya Prasad Bhalavi	2,574	2.85	
SP	Thakur Jeetendra Shah	2,115	2.34	
Margin of victory		10,719	11.87	
Total valid votes		90,317		
Rejected ballots		6	0.01	
Turnout		90,323	62.20	
Registered electors		145,208		
INC gain from INC		Swing		
