= Govind Narayan Singh =

5th Chief Minister of Madhya Pradesh

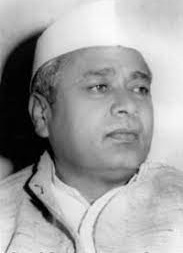

12th Governor of Bihar
- In office 26 February 1988 – 24 January 1989
- Chief Minister: Bhagwat Jha Azad
- Preceded by: Pendekanti Venkatasubbaiah
- Succeeded by: Dipak Kumar Sen (Acting)

5th Chief Minister of Madhya Pradesh
- In office 30 July 1967 – 12 March 1969
- Preceded by: Dwarka Prasad Mishra
- Succeeded by: Raja Nareshchandra Singh

Personal details
- Born: 25 July 1920 Rampur Baghelan, Bagelkhand Agency, British India (Now in Madhya Pradesh, India)
- Died: 10 May 2005 (aged 84)
- Party: Indian National Congress
- Other political affiliations: Samyukta Vidhayak Dal
- Spouse: Padmavati Devi
- Children: 5 sons, 1 daughter
- Education: Banaras Hindu University

Govind Narayan Singh (25 July 1920 – 10 May 2005), was an Indian politician. He was Chief Minister of Madhya Pradesh from 30 July 1967 to 12 March 1969. He was also Governor of Bihar state from 26 February 1988 to 24 January 1989.

== Early life ==
Govind Narayan Singh was born in a Rajput family to Awadhesh Pratap Singh, the first chief minister of Vindhya Pradesh and Maharaj Kumari. He received his PhD from the Banaras Hindu University (BHU) in literature.

== Political career ==
Singh was elected to the Vindhya Pradesh Vidhan Sabha in 1951 from Rampur-Baghelan constituency. Later, he was elected to the Madhya Pradesh Vidhan Sabha in 1957 and 1962.

He was Deputy Minister of Home Affairs and Deputy Minister of Public Works (Irrigation) from 27 May 1963. From 30 September 1963, to 29 July 1967, the Minister of Local Government in the Dwarka Prasad Mishra ministry.

In 1967, he was elected to the Madhya Pradesh Vidhan Sabha as an Indian National Congress candidate but soon rebelled against Dwarka Prasad Mishra and he resigned from the Congress party. He formed a new political party known as the Lok Sewak Dal and became the Chief Minister of Madhya Pradesh as the leader of a coalition, known as the Samyukta Vidhayak Dal. He was the chief minister of the state from 30 July 1967 to 12 March 1969. He returned to Indian National Congress.

He also served a term as the Governor of Bihar state from 26 February 1988 to 24 January 1989.

== Personal life ==
Singh had five sons and one daughter. Of his sons, Harsh Singh is M.L.A. from Rampur-Baghelan constituency and Dhruv Narayan Singh was an M.L.A. from Bhopal Madhya (Vidhan Sabha constituency) to Madhya Pradesh Legislative Assembly.
