= Chhindwara Assembly constituency =

Constituency of the Madhya Pradesh legislative assembly in India

Coordinates: 22.06°N 78.94°E

Chhindwara
- Constituency No. 126 for the Madhya Pradesh Legislative Assembly

Constituency details
- Country: India
- Region: Central India
- State: Madhya Pradesh
- District: Chhindwara
- Lok Sabha constituency: Chhindwara
- Established: 1951
- Reservation: None

Member of Legislative Assembly
- 16th Madhya Pradesh Legislative Assembly
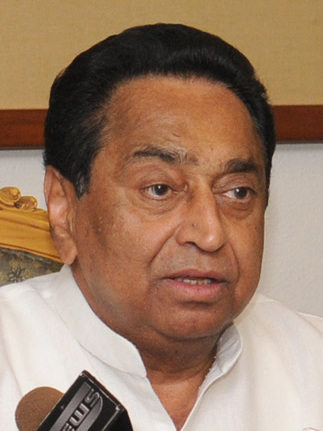
- Incumbent Kamal Nath
- Party: Indian National Congress
- Elected year: 2023
- Preceded by: Deepak Saxena

Chhindwara Assembly constituency is one of the 230 Legislative Assembly constituencies of Madhya Pradesh state in central India. It is part of Chhindwara District.

Kamal Nath, the former Chief Minister of Madhya Pradesh, is the incumbent MLA of this constituency.

== Members of the Legislative Assembly ==
Year	Name	Party
1952	K. G. Rekhade	Indian National Congress
1957	Vidyawati Vidyashanker Mehta	Indian National Congress
1962	Vidyawati Vidyashanker Mehta	Indian National Congress
1967	Vidyawati Vidyashanker Mehta	Indian National Congress
1972	Jagdish Prasad Chandrakar	Indian National Congress
1977	Bijay Kumar Panti	Indian National Congress
1980	Vijaykumar Dhanpal	Indian National Congress (Indira)
1985	Kamleshwari Shukla	Indian National Congress
1990	Chandrabhan Singh Chaudhary	Bharatiya Janata Party
1993	Deepak Saxena	Indian National Congress
1998	Deepak Saxena	Indian National Congress
2003	Chandrabhan Singh Chaudhary	Bharatiya Janata Party
2008	Deepak Saxena	Indian National Congress
2013	Chandrabhan Singh Chaudhary	Bharatiya Janata Party
2018	Deepak Saxena	Indian National Congress
2019 (Note: by poll)	Kamal Nath	Indian National Congress
2023	Kamal Nath	Indian National Congress

== Election results ==
=== 2023 ===
2023 Madhya Pradesh Legislative Assembly election: Chhindwara
Party	Candidate	Votes	%	±%
INC	Kamal Nath	132,302	56.44	+5.97
BJP	Vivek Bunty Sahu	95,708	40.83	−2.58
NOTA	None of the above	1,741	0.74	−0.62
Majority		36,594	15.61	+8.55
Turnout		234,427	82.89	+2.27
INC hold		Swing		

=== 2019 bypoll ===
2019 By-election: Chhindwara
Party	Candidate	Votes	%	±%
INC	Kamal Nath	114,459	55.53	
BJP	Vivek Bunty Sahu	88,622	43.00	
NOTA	None of the Above	2,027	0.98	
Majority		25,837	12.54	
Turnout		2,08,465	79.21	
INC hold		Swing		

=== 2018 ===
2018 Madhya Pradesh Legislative Assembly election: Chhindwara
Party	Candidate	Votes	%	±%
INC	Deepak Saxena	104,034	50.47	
BJP	Choudhary Chandrabhan Singh Kuber Singh	89,487	43.41	
Independent	Santosh Suryawanshi	2,326	1.13	
GGP	Pushpa Devi Masram	2,211	1.07	
NOTA	None of the above	2,800	1.36	
Majority		14,547	7.06	
Turnout		206,124	80.62	

== See also ==
- Chhindwara
