= Anusuiya Uikey =

Indian politician

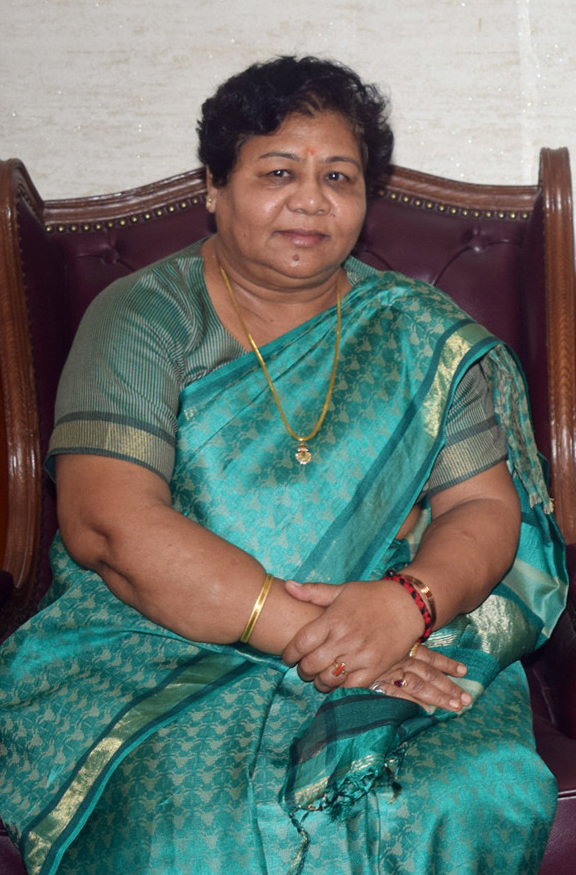

18th Governor of Manipur
- In office 23 February 2023 – 26 July 2024
- Chief Minister: N. Biren Singh
- Preceded by: La. Ganesan
- Succeeded by: Lakshman Prasad Acharya (additional charge)

6th Governor of Chhattisgarh
- In office 29 July 2019 – 22 February 2023
- Chief Minister: Bhupesh Baghel
- Preceded by: Anandiben Patel
- Succeeded by: B. Harichandan

Member of Parliament, Rajya Sabha
- In office 3 April 2006 – 2 April 2012
- Constituency: Madhya Pradesh

Minister for Women and Child Development, Government of Madhya Pradesh
- In office 1985–1990
- Chief Minister: Arjun Singh

Member of Madhya Pradesh Legislative Assembly
- In office 3 February 1985 – 27 February 1990
- Preceded by: Parasram Dhurve
- Succeeded by: Kamla Wadiva
- Constituency: Damua

Personal details
- Born: 10 April 1957 (age 69) Chhindwara, Madhya Pradesh, India
- Citizenship: Indian
- Party: Bharatiya Janata Party (1998–2019) (Note: According to the Indian Constitution, whenever a politician becomes the Governor of any state, his membership of the political party ends automatically)
- Other political affiliations: Indian National Congress (1985–1998)
- Education: M.A. (Economics), LL.B.
- Profession: Agriculturist and Social Worker

Anusuiya Uikey (born 10 April 1957) is a politician who served as Governor of Chhattisgarh and Governor of Manipur from 2019 to 2023 and 2023 to 2024 respectively. She was elected to the Madhya Pradesh Legislative Assembly from Damua in the 1985 as a member of the Indian National Congress. She became Minister for Women and Child Development in Arjun Singh cabinet. However, she lost the election in 1990 for the same seat. In 1998, She joined Bharatiya Janata Party and unsuccessfully contested the 1998 elections from same only. She became a member of Rajya Sabha from Madhya Pradesh in 2006.

She was Governor of Chhattisgarh from 16 July 2019 to 12 February 2023 and was appointed Governor of Manipur on 12 February 2023 till 2024.

== Notes ==
Political offices
| Preceded by Anandiben Patel; Additional Charge | Governor of Chhattisgarh; 29 July 2019 – 22 February 2023 | Succeeded by B. Harichandan |
| Preceded by La. Ganesan | Governor of Manipur; 22 February 2023 - 30 July 2024 | Succeeded by Lakshman Acharya |
