= Krishna Mohan Seth =

Former Governor and Lt. General (Retd.)

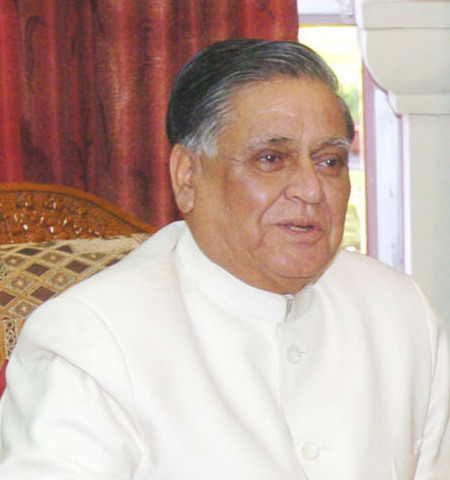

2nd Governor of Chhattisgarh
- In office 2 June 2003 – 25 January 2007
- Chief Minister: Ajit Jogi; Raman Singh
- Preceded by: D. N. Sahay
- Succeeded by: E. S. L. Narasimhan

Governor of Madhya Pradesh (Acting)
- In office 2 May 2004 – 29 July 2004
- Chief Minister: Uma Bharti
- Preceded by: Ram Prakash Gupta
- Succeeded by: Balram Jakhar

9th Governor of Tripura
- In office 23 June 2000 – 31 May 2003
- Chief Minister: Manik Sarkar
- Preceded by: Siddheshwar Prasad
- Succeeded by: D. N. Sahay

Personal details
- Born: 19 December 1939 (age 86) Allahabad, United Provinces, British India (Now Uttar Pradesh, India)
- Spouse: Veena
- Children: 2

Lieutenant General Krishna Mohan Seth retired as the Adjutant General of Indian Army and was the Governor of Chhattisgarh, Madhya Pradesh and Tripura.

== Personal life ==
Krishna Mohan Seth was born on 19 December 1939, in Allahabad. He is married to Veena and they have two sons, including 31st Army Chief of Indian Army General Dhiraj Seth and Rear Admiral Ravnish Seth.

== Military career ==
Lieutenant General Seth was commissioned in the Regiment of Artillery of the Indian Army. He commanded the 17 (Parachute) Field Regiment between March 1979 and October 1980.

He commanded XXI Strike Corps at Bhopal, following which he was picked to command III Corps in Nagaland between October 1994 and October 1995. He was then appointed the Adjutant General. He retired on 31 December 1997.

== Political career ==
He was the Governor of Tripura from 23 June 2000 to 31 May 2003. This was followed by a tenure as the Governor of Chhattisgarh between 2 June 2003 and 25 January 2007. The Counter Terrorism and Jungle Warfare School in Kanker, Chhattisgarh was the brainchild of General Seth during his tenure.

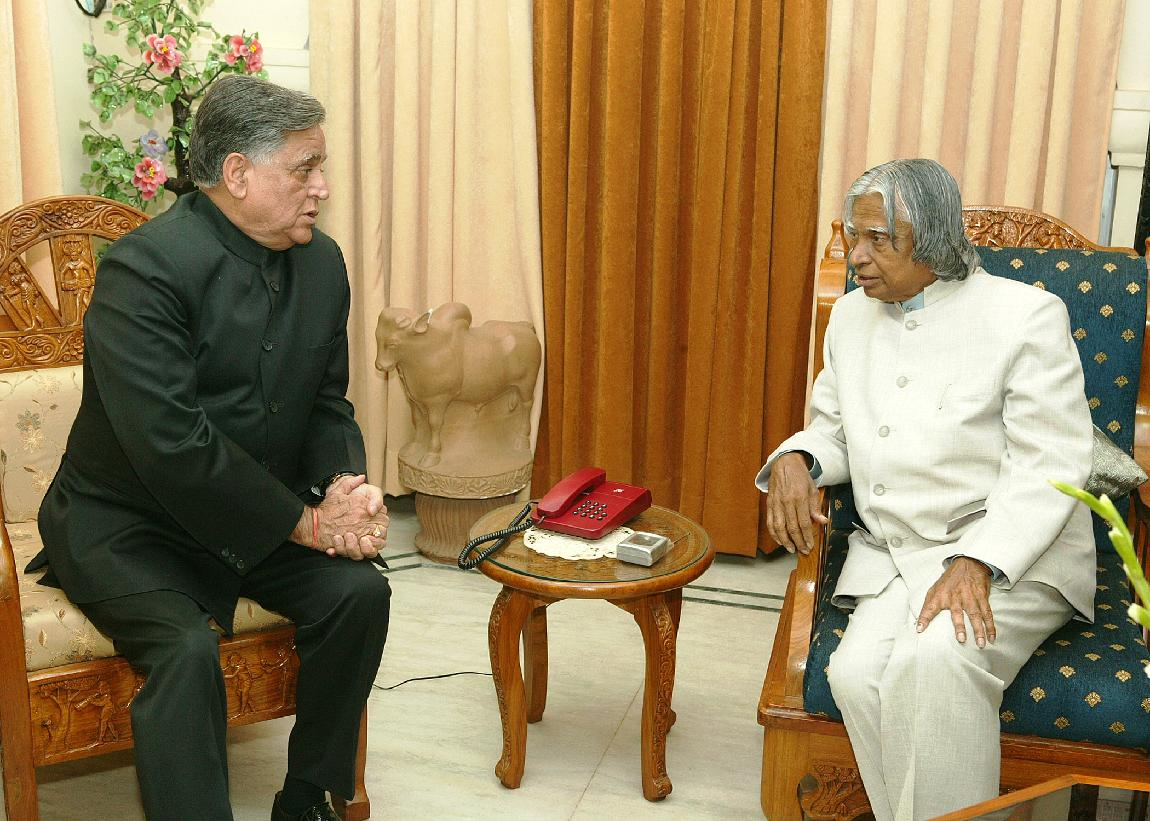
The Governor of Chhattisgarh, Shri Krishna Mohan Seth calling on the President of India, Dr A P J Abdul Kalam at Raipur, Chhattisgarh on 3 June 2004

He was the acting Governor of Madhya Pradesh between 2 May 2004 and 29 June 2004.

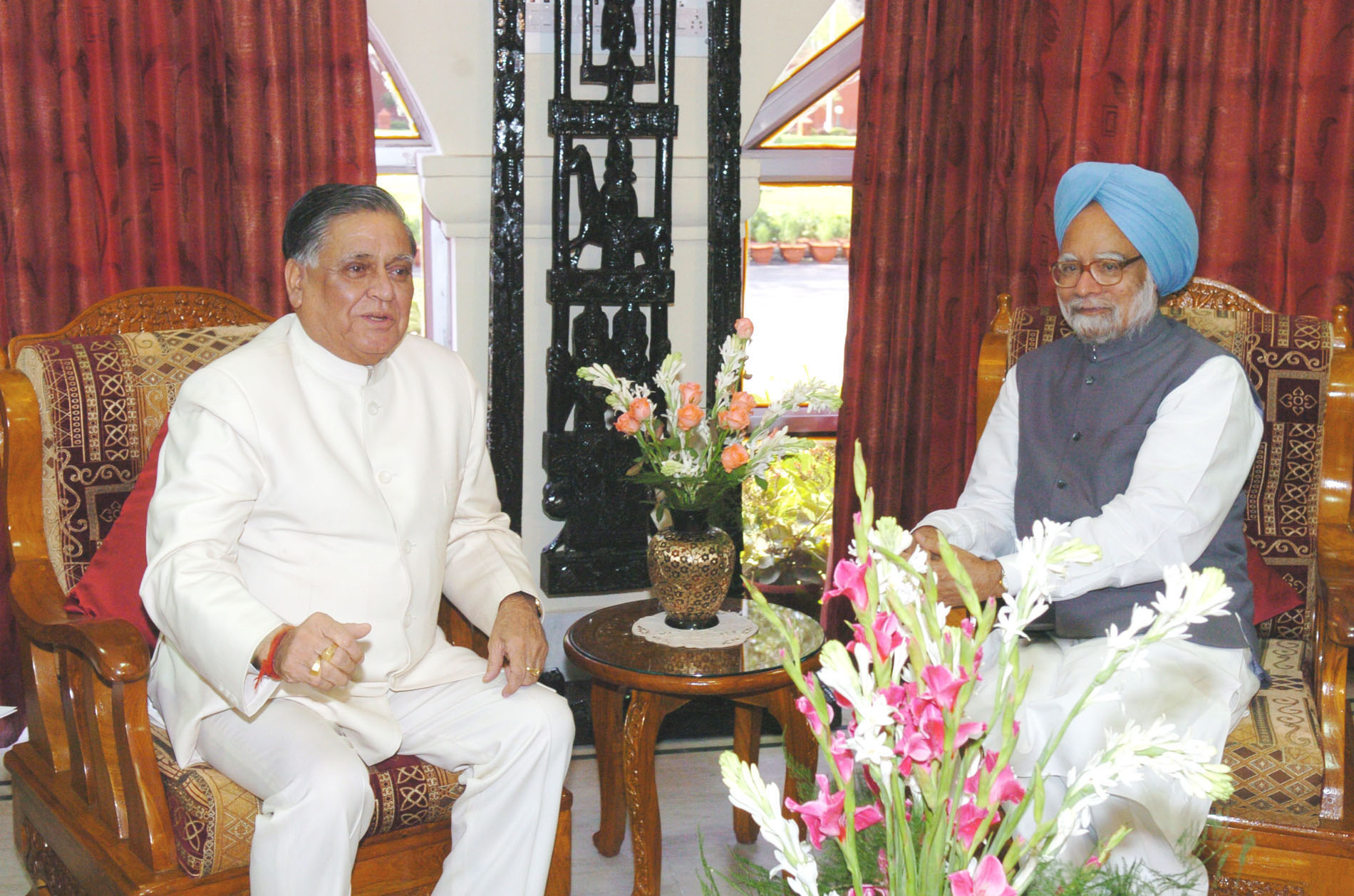
The Prime Minister, Dr Manmohan Singh with the Governor of Chhattisgarh, Lt Gen KM Seth at Raj Bhawan in Raipur, 30 April 2005.

== Major Decorations ==
- He was awarded the Ati Vishisht Seva Medal in 1985 for contribution towards countering terrorist activities in Ukhrul district of Manipur.
- He was awarded Param Vishisht Seva Medal in 1996 for excellence in services in all fields of the armed forces, specially for contribution towards counter insurgency operation in Nagaland, Manipur, Mizoram and Tripura.

He is also the life member of International Film And Television Club of Asian Academy Of Film & Television.
