= Chourai Assembly constituency =

Constituency of the Madhya Pradesh legislative assembly in India

Coordinates: 22.05°N 79.25°E

Chourai
- Constituency No. 124 for the Madhya Pradesh Legislative Assembly

Constituency details
- Country: India
- Region: Central India
- State: Madhya Pradesh
- District: Chhindwara
- Lok Sabha constituency: Chhindwara
- Established: 1962
- Reservation: None

Member of Legislative Assembly
- 16th Madhya Pradesh Legislative Assembly
- Incumbent Choudhary Sujeet Mersingh
- Party: Indian National Congress
- Elected year: 2023
- Preceded by: Ramesh Dubey

Chourai Assembly constituency is one of the 230 Vidhan Sabha (Legislative Assembly) constituencies of Madhya Pradesh state in central India.

It is part of Chhindwara district.

== Members of Legislative Assembly ==
Election	Member	Party
1962	Than Singh Hansa	Independent
1967	D. Sharma	Indian National Congress
1972	Laxminarayan Lalji Prasad	Indian National Congress
1977	Baijnath Prasad Saxena	Indian National Congress
1980	Baijnath Prasad Saxena	Indian National Congress
1985	Baijnath Prasad Saxena	Indian National Congress
1990	Ramesh Dubey	Bharatiya Janata Party
1993	Choudhary Sujeet Mersingh	Indian National Congress
1998	Dhoopsingh Patel	Indian National Congress
2003	Ramesh Dubey	Bharatiya Janata Party
2008	Choudhary Sujeet Mersingh	Indian National Congress
2013	Ramesh Dubey	Bharatiya Janata Party
2018	Choudhary Sujeet Mersingh	Indian National Congress
2023	Choudhary Sujeet Mersingh	Indian National Congress

== Election results ==
=== 2023 ===
2023 Madhya Pradesh Legislative Assembly election: Chourai
Party	Candidate	Votes	%	±%
INC	Choudhary Sujeet Mersingh	81,613	42.36	−3.6
BJP	Lakhan Kumar Varma	73,024	37.9	−0.43
Independent	Neeraj Thakur (Bunty Patel)	19,681	10.22	
Independent	Pawansha Saryam	10,751	5.58	
GGP	Ishwar Singh Tekam	1,811	0.94	−6.42
NOTA	None of the above	2,072	1.08	−0.29
Majority		8,589	4.46	−3.17
Turnout		192,662	88.31	+1.54
INC hold		Swing		

=== 2018 ===
2018 Madhya Pradesh Legislative Assembly election: Chourai
Party	Candidate	Votes	%	±%
INC	Choudhary Sujeet Mersingh	78,415	45.96	
BJP	Ramesh Dubey	65,411	38.33	
GGP	Jay Pal Uike	12,551	7.36	
Independent	Rajendra Singh Raghuwanshi	2,582	1.51	
Independent	Lodhi Vipin Verma	1,900	1.11	
BSP	Ashok Sevatkar	1,596	0.94	
AAP	Prashant Sharma	1,549	0.91	
NOTA	None of the above	2,331	1.37	
Majority		13,004	7.63	
Turnout		170,632	86.77	
INC gain from		Swing		

== See also ==
- Chhindwara (Lok Sabha constituency)
- Chaurai Khas
