= Parasia Assembly constituency =

Constituency of the Madhya Pradesh legislative assembly in India

Coordinates: 22.19°N 78.76°E

Parasia
- Constituency No. 127 for the Madhya Pradesh Legislative Assembly

Constituency details
- Country: India
- Region: Central India
- State: Madhya Pradesh
- District: Chhindwara
- Lok Sabha constituency: Chhindwara
- Established: 1957
- Reservation: SC

Member of Legislative Assembly
- 16th Madhya Pradesh Legislative Assembly
- Incumbent Sohanlal Valmik
- Party: Indian National Congress
- Elected year: 2023
- Preceded by: Tarachand Bawaria

Parasia is one of the 230 Legislative Assembly (Vidhan Sabha) constituencies of Madhya Pradesh state in central India.

It is part of Chhindwara district.

== Demography ==
As of 2011 Census Parasia, the biggest division and tehsil of Chhindwara district in Madhya Pradesh, had a population of 37,876. Males constitute 51% of the population and females 49%. Dongar Parasia has an average literacy rate of 71%, higher than the national average of 59.5%: male literacy is 78% and female literacy is 64%. In Dongar Parasia, 12% of the population is under 6 years of age.

== Members of the Legislative Assembly ==
Election	Name	Party
1957	Phulbhansa	Indian National Congress
1962	Shanti Swaroop Kartaram	Independent
1967	Barikrao Amrutrao	Indian National Congress
1972	Barikrao Amrutrao	Indian National Congress
1977	Damu Patil	Indian National Congress
1980	Damu Patil	Indian National Congress (I)
1985	Ramji Mastkar	Bharatiya Janata Party
1990	Ramji Mastkar	Bharatiya Janata Party
1993	Harinarayan Dehariya	Indian National Congress
1998	Leeladhar Puria	Indian National Congress
2003	Tarachand Bawaria	Bharatiya Janata Party
2008	Tarachand Bawaria	Bharatiya Janata Party
2013	Sohanlal Valmik	Indian National Congress
2018	Sohanlal Valmik	Indian National Congress
2023	Sohanlal Valmik	Indian National Congress

== Election results ==
=== 2023 ===
2023 Madhya Pradesh Legislative Assembly election: Parasia (SC)
Party	Candidate	Votes	%	±%
INC	Sohanlal Valmik	88,227	47.75	−0.59
BJP	Jyoti Daheriya	86,059	46.57	+5.97
Independent	Santoshi Dehariya	1,706	0.92	−0.12
NOTA	None of the above	3,049	1.65	−0.29
Majority		2,168	1.18	−6.56
Turnout		184,776	84.53	+3.31
INC hold		Swing		

=== 2018 ===
2018 Madhya Pradesh Legislative Assembly election: Parasia
Party	Candidate	Votes	%	±%
INC	Sohanlal Valmik	79,553	48.34	
BJP	Tarachand Bawaria	66,819	40.6	
GGP	Satish Nagwanshi	4,717	2.87	
AAP	Durga Bai Amrawanshi	2,232	1.36	
Independent	Tulsidas Mahalgavaiya	2,187	1.33	
BSP	Govind Prasad Barkhania	2,135	1.3	
Independent	Santosh Dehariya	1,714	1.04	
NOTA	None of the above	3,186	1.94	
Majority		12,734	7.74	
Turnout		164,578	81.22	
INC hold		Swing		

=== 2013 ===
2013 Madhya Pradesh Legislative Assembly election: Parasia (SC)
Party	Candidate	Votes	%	±%
INC	Sohanlal Valmik	72,235	47.15	
BJP	Tarachand Bavariya	50,156	42.14	
ABGP	Vishnu Dehariya	4,924	3.21	
Independent	Devlal Dehariya	2073	1.35	
BSP	Devraj Bavariya	1600	1.04	N/A
Independent	Rajesh Mohabiya	1023	0.67	
Independent	Dilip Kumar Gajbhiye	742	0.48	
Independent	Jitendra Chouhan	616	0.40	
NOTA	None of the Above	4627	3.02	
Majority				
Turnout		1,53,213	81.16	
INC gain from BJP		Swing		

== See also ==
- Parasia
