= Kamta Prasad (politician) =

Indian politician

1st Chief Minister of Bundelkhand Division
- In office 12 march 1948 – 28 May 1948
- Preceded by: Established
- Succeeded by: Vindhya Pradesh

Personal details
- Born: Bundelkhand, India
- Political party: Indian National Congress

Kamta Prasad Saxena was an Indian politician from the state of the Madhya Pradesh. He represented Jatara Vidhan Sabha constituency of Madhya Pradesh Legislative Assembly by winning General election of 1957.Awadhesh Pratap Singh became the first Chief Minister of the Baghelkhand Division and Kamta Prasad Saxena was appointed as the Chief Minister of the Bundelkhand Division. Later Awadhesh Pratap Singh became the Chief Minister of the entire state of Vindhya Pradesh.
