= Lok Bhavan, Raipur =

Residence of the Governor of Chhattisgarh

Lok Bhavan
- Interactive map of the Lok Bhavan area

General information
- Coordinates: 21.242307°N 81.645209°E
- Current tenants: Ramen Daka
- Owner: Government of Chhattisgarh

Lok Bhavan formerly Raj Bhavan (translation: Government House) is the official residence of the governor of Chhattisgarh. It is located in the capital city of Raipur, Chhattisgarh. Current Tenant is Ramen Deka.

== See also ==
- Government Houses of the British Indian Empire
