= All India Muslim Majlis (Dr. Faridi) =

Political Party

All India Muslim Majlis (Urdu: آل انڈیا مسلم مجلس) is a Muslim political party in India based in Uttar Pradesh. It was founded by the Abdul Jaleel Faridi in 1968 following the split in Samyukt Vidhayak Dal.

== History ==
Muslim Majlis was founded by Abdul Jaleel Faridi in 1968, after he had become disillusioned with the Samyukt Vidhayak Dal. In the 1977 Uttar Pradesh Legislative Assembly election two candidates of Muslim Majlis won over the Janata Party symbol.

After the death of Faridi, Alhaj Zulfiqarulla became the president and after that Mohd. Qamar Alam Kazmi became the president of All India Muslim Majlis.

The youth wing of the party is called All India Youth Majlis. The president of the youth wing is Mohammad Kashif Yunus.

Muslim Majlis later joined Uttar Pradesh United Democratic Front led by former minister Janab C.M. Ibrahim and patronised by Shahi Imam Syed Ahmed Bukhari.

== Activism ==
- In 1992 Qamar Alam Kazmi raised his voice against the demolition of Babri Masjid. He started Karwane Insaf (Nyay Yatra) against the Ram Rath Yatra of Advani. He did several of Dharnas, Morchas etc. in between the period of his presidency.
- In 2002 Muslim Majlis joined the Awami Front, but later left it under the presidency of Qamar Alam Kazmi. After Kazmi, Khalid Sabir was elected as president on 18 August 2002.
