= Vikram Singh (Madhya Pradesh politician) =

Indian politician

Member of Madhya Pradesh Legislative Assembly
- Incumbent
- Assumed office 2018
- Preceded by: Harsh Singh
- Constituency: Rampur-Baghelan

Personal details
- Party: Bharatiya Janata Party
- Profession: Politician

Vikram Singh (born 1981) is an Indian politician from Madhya Pradesh. He is a two time elected member of the Madhya Pradesh Legislative Assembly from 2018 and 2023, representing Rampur-Baghelan Assembly constituency as a member of the Bharatiya Janata Party.

== Early life and education ==
Singh is from Rampur Baghelan, Satna District, Madhya Pradesh. He is the son of former four time MLA Harsh Singh. He completed his graduation in commerce in 2003 at Khalsa College, which is affiliated with Delhi University.

== Career ==
Singh won the 2018 Madhya Pradesh Legislative Assembly election on Bharatiya Janata Party ticket and defeated his closest rival, Ramlakhan Singh, of Bahujan Samaj Party, by a margin of 15,687 votes. He polled a total of 68,816 votes while Ramlakhan Singh received 53,129 votes. The Indian National Congress candidate, Ramshankar Payasi, came third polling 42,501 votes.

He retained the seat winning the 2023 Madhya Pradesh Legislative Assembly election again on the BJP ticket and defeated INC candidate Ramshankar Payasi by an increased margin of 22,581 votes, after receiving 85,287 votes. Payasi secured 62,706 votes.
