= Chief Minister of Madhya Pradesh =

Chief ministers of Madhya Pradesh, India

- Emblem of Madhya Pradesh

- Flag of India

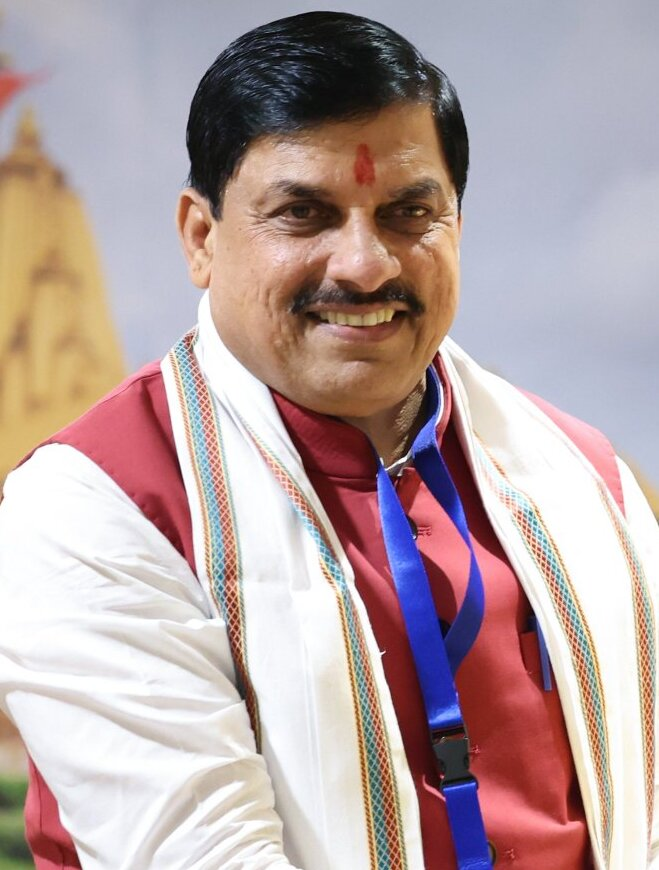
- Incumbent; Mohan Yadav since 13 December 2023
- Government of Madhya Pradesh
- Style: The Honourable
- Status: Head of Government
- Abbreviation: CM
- Member of: Madhya Pradesh Legislative Assembly and Madhya Pradesh Council of Ministers
- Reports to: Governor of Madhya Pradesh; Legislative Assembly of Madhya Pradesh
- Appointer: Governor of Madhya Pradesh
- Term length: 5 years; Chief minister's term is for five years, provided the confidence of legislative assembly and is subject to no term limits.
- Inaugural holder: Ravishankar Shukla
- Formation: 1 November 1956 (70 years ago)
- Deputy: Deputy Chief Minister of Madhya Pradesh
- Salary: ₹255,000 (US$2,700)
- Website: https://cmoffice.mp.gov.in/

The chief minister of Madhya Pradesh is the chief executive of the Indian state of Madhya Pradesh. In accordance with the Constitution of India, the governor is a state's de jure head, but de facto executive authority rests with the chief minister. Following elections to the Madhya Pradesh Legislative Assembly, the state's governor usually invites the party (or coalition) with a majority of seats to form the government. The governor appoints the chief minister, whose council of ministers are collectively responsible to the assembly. Given the confidence of the assembly, the chief minister's term is for five years and is subject to no term limits. Chief Minister also serves as Leader of the House in the Legislative Assembly.

Following Madhya Pradesh's reorganisation on 1 November 1956, 19 people have served as its chief minister. Twelve of these belonged to the Indian National Congress, including the inaugural officeholder Ravishankar Shukla. The first non-Congress chief minister was Govind Narayan Singh who defected from the party and lead a Samyukta Vidhayak Dal government from 1967 to 1969. Digvijaya Singh of the Congress became the first officeholder to serve two full five-year terms. He was succeeded by Uma Bharti of the Bharatiya Janata Party, Madhya Pradesh's only woman chief minister. Shivraj Singh Chouhan of the Bharatiya Janata Party was the longest-serving chief minister of the state, serving for over 16 and half years. Chouhan was succeeded by Dr. Mohan Yadav of his own party after the 2023 elections, which was seen as a landslide victory for the BJP.

== Predecessors ==
=== Vindhya Padesh (1948–1956) ===
==== Prime Ministers of Union of Baghelkhand and Bundelkhand States (UBBS) ====
#	Name	Tenure			Appointed by (Rajpramukh)	Party
1	Awadhesh Pratap Singh	28 May 1948	14 April 1949	322 days	Martand Singh	Indian National Congress
2	Neil Bruniat Bonerji	15 April 1949	30 April 1949	15 days	Martand Singh	Independent
3	Shreenath Mehta	1 May 1949	31 December 1949	244 days	Martand Singh	Independent

==== Chief Ministers of Vindhya Pradesh ====
In 1948, the eastern regions of Central India Agency, became the Union of Baghelkhand and Bundelkhand States, and was admitted into the Dominion of India as a Part B state, headed by a Rajpramukh under the advice of a Prime Minister. It was renamed Vindhya Pradesh and converted to a Part C state, headed by a Chief Commissioner, on 1 January 1950. From 1950 till 1952 it did not have chief minister as a Part C state. In 1952, a legislative assembly was created and the post of Chief Commissioner was replaced by the Lieutenant Governor.

#	Name	Tenure			Assembly	Appointed by	Party
1	Sambhu Nath Shukla	31 March 1952	31 October 1956	4 years, 214 days	1st (1952)	K. Santhanam	Indian National Congress

=== Madhya Bharat (1948–1956) ===
In 1948, the western regions of Central India Agency and the Gwalior and Indore residencies, became the new state of Madhya Bharat. It was admitted into the union as a "Part B" state.

==== Prime Ministers of Madhya Bharat ====
#	Portrait	Name	Tenure		Appointed by	Party
1		Liladhar Joshi	28 May 1948	May 1949	Jivaji Rao Scindia	Indian National Congress
2		Gopikrishna Vijayavargiya	May 1949	25 January 1950	Jivaji Rao Scindia	Indian National Congress

==== Chief Ministers of Madhya Bharat ====
#	Name	Tenure			Assembly	Appointed by	Party
1	Gopikrishna Vijayavargiya	26 January 1950	18 October 1950	264 days	Not yet created	Jivaji Rao Scindia	Indian National Congress
2	Takhatmal Jain	18 October 1950	31 March 1952	1 year, 164 days	Not yet created	Jivaji Rao Scindia	Indian National Congress
3	Mishrilal Gangwal	31 March 1952	16 April 1955	3 years, 15 days	1st (1952)	Jivaji Rao Scindia	Indian National Congress
(2)	Takhatmal Jain	16 April 1955	31 October 1956	1 year, 198 days	1st (1952)	Jivaji Rao Scindia	Indian National Congress

=== Bhopal State (1949–1956) ===
==== Chief Minister of Bhopal State (1949–1956) ====
On 30 April 1949, Sir Hamidullah Khan, the Nawab of Bhopal signed an Instrument of Accession to the Dominion of India. The state of Bhopal was taken over by the Union Government on 1 June 1949, and was declared a "Part C" state.

#	Portrait	Name	Tenure			Assembly	Party
1		Shankar Dayal Sharma	31 March 1952	31 October 1956	4 years, 214 days	1st (1952)	Indian National Congress

== List of chief ministers of Madhya Pradesh (since 1950) ==
After the independence of India, the state of Madhya Pradesh was created in 1950 from the Central Provinces and Berar and the princely state of Makrai with Nagpur as the capital of the state.

The States Reorganisation Act, 1956 merged the states of Madhya Bharat, Vindhya Pradesh, and Bhopal were merged into Madhya Pradesh and the Marathi-speaking southern region Vidarbha, which included Nagpur, was ceded to Bombay. In November 2000, as part of the Madhya Pradesh Reorganization Act the eastern and southeastern portion of the state was split off to form the new state of Chhattisgarh.

#	Portrait	Name	Constituency	Tenure			Assembly (election)	Party (Note: This column only names the chief minister's party. The state government he heads may be a complex coalition of several parties and independents; these are not listed here.)
1		Ravishankar Shukla	N/A	26 January 1950	30 March 1952	6 years, 340 days	Not yet created	Indian National Congress
1		Ravishankar Shukla	Saraipali	31 March 1952	31 October 1956	6 years, 340 days	1st (1952)	Indian National Congress
1		Ravishankar Shukla	Saraipali	1 November 1956	31 December 1956	6 years, 340 days	1st (1952)	Indian National Congress
2		Bhagwantrao Mandloi	Khandwa	9 January 1957	31 January 1957	22 days	1st (1952)	Indian National Congress
3		Kailash Nath Katju	Jaora	31 January 1957	14 March 1957	5 years, 40 days	1st (1952)	Indian National Congress
3		Kailash Nath Katju	Jaora	14 March 1957	12 March 1962	5 years, 40 days	2nd (1957)	Indian National Congress
(2)		Bhagwantrao Mandloi	Khandwa	12 March 1962	30 September 1963	1 year, 202 days	3rd (1962)	Indian National Congress
4		Dwarka Prasad Mishra	Katangi	30 September 1963	8 March 1967	3 years, 303 days	3rd (1962)	Indian National Congress
4		Dwarka Prasad Mishra	Katangi	8 March 1967	30 July 1967	3 years, 303 days	4th (1967)	Indian National Congress
5		Govind Narayan Singh	Rampur-Baghelan	30 July 1967	13 March 1969	1 year, 226 days	4th (1967)	Samyukta Vidhayak Dal
6		Nareshchandra Singh	Pussour	13 March 1969	26 March 1969	13 days	4th (1967)	Samyukta Vidhayak Dal
7		Shyama Charan Shukla	Rajim	26 March 1969	29 January 1972	2 years, 309 days	4th (1967)	Indian National Congress
8		Prakash Chandra Sethi	Ujjain North	29 January 1972	22 March 1972	3 years, 328 days	4th (1967)	Indian National Congress
8		Prakash Chandra Sethi	Ujjain North	23 March 1972	23 December 1975	3 years, 328 days	5th (1972)	Indian National Congress
(7)		Shyama Charan Shukla	Rajim	23 December 1975	30 April 1977	1 year, 128 days	5th (1972)	Indian National Congress
–		Vacant (Note: When President's rule is in force in a state, its council of ministers stands dissolved. The office of chief minister thus lies vacant. At times, the legislative assembly also stands dissolved.) (President's rule)	N/A	30 April 1977	24 June 1977	55 days	Dissolved	N/A
9		Kailash Chandra Joshi	Bagli	24 June 1977	18 January 1978	208 days	6th (1977)	Janata Party
10		Virendra Sakhlecha	Jawad	18 January 1978	20 January 1980	2 years, 2 days	6th (1977)	Janata Party
11		Sunder Lal Patwa	Mandsaur	20 January 1980	17 February 1980	28 days	6th (1977)	Janata Party
–		Vacant (President's rule)	N/A	17 February 1980	9 June 1980	113 days	Dissolved	N/A
12		Arjun Singh	Churhat	9 June 1980	10 March 1985	4 years, 277 days	7th (1980)	Indian National Congress
12		Arjun Singh	Churhat	11 March 1985	13 March 1985	4 years, 277 days	8th (1985)	Indian National Congress
13		Motilal Vora	Durg	13 March 1985	14 February 1988	2 years, 338 days	8th (1985)	Indian National Congress
(12)		Arjun Singh	Kharsia	14 February 1988	25 January 1989	346 days	8th (1985)	Indian National Congress
(13)		Motilal Vora	Durg	25 January 1989	9 December 1989	318 days	8th (1985)	Indian National Congress
(7)		Shyama Charan Shukla	Not contested	9 December 1989	5 March 1990	86 days	8th (1985)	Indian National Congress
(11)		Sunder Lal Patwa	Bhojpur	5 March 1990	15 December 1992	2 years, 285 days	9th (1990)	Bharatiya Janata Party
–		Vacant (President's rule)	N/A	15 December 1992	7 December 1993	357 days	Dissolved	N/A
14		Digvijaya Singh	Chachoura	7 December 1993	1 December 1998	10 years, 1 day	10th (1993)	Indian National Congress
14		Digvijaya Singh	Raghogarh	1 December 1998	8 December 2003	10 years, 1 day	11th (1998)	Indian National Congress
15		Uma Bharti	Malhara	8 December 2003	23 August 2004	259 days	12th (2003)	Bharatiya Janata Party
16		Babulal Gaur	Govindpura	23 August 2004	29 November 2005	1 year, 98 days	12th (2003)	Bharatiya Janata Party
17		Shivraj Singh Chouhan	Budhni	29 November 2005	12 December 2008	13 years, 18 days	12th (2003)	Bharatiya Janata Party
17		Shivraj Singh Chouhan	Budhni	12 December 2008	13 December 2013	13 years, 18 days	13th (2008)	Bharatiya Janata Party
17		Shivraj Singh Chouhan	Budhni	14 December 2013	17 December 2018	13 years, 18 days	14th (2013)	Bharatiya Janata Party
18		Kamal Nath	Chhindwara (by- elected)	17 December 2018	23 March 2020	1 year, 97 days	15th (2018)	Indian National Congress
(17)		Shivraj Singh Chouhan	Budhni	23 March 2020	13 December 2023	3 years, 265 days	15th (2018)	Bharatiya Janata Party
19		Mohan Yadav	Ujjain South	13 December 2023	Incumbent	2 years, 338 days	16th (2023)	Bharatiya Janata Party

== Statistics ==
Fraction of time of holding CMO by party (as of July 2026)
1. Bharatiya Janata Party (30.1%)
2. Indian National Congress (62.2%)
3. Janata Party (3.54%)
4. Samyukta Vidhayak Dal (2.21%)
5. President's Rule (1.90%)

#	Chief Minister	Party	Length of term	
#	Chief Minister	Party	Longest tenure	Total tenure
1	Shivraj Singh Chouhan	BJP	13 years, 18 days	16 years, 283 days
2	Digvijay Singh	INC	10 years, 1 day	10 years, 1 day
3	Ravishankar Shukla	INC	6 years, 340 days	6 years, 340 days
4	Arjun Singh	INC	4 years, 277 days	5 years, 258 days
5	Kailash Nath Katju	INC	5 years, 40 days	5 years, 40 days
6	Shyama Charan Shukla	INC	2 years, 309 days	4 years, 158 days
7	Prakash Chandra Sethi	INC	3 years, 328 days	3 years, 328 days
8	Dwarka Prasad Mishra	INC	3 years, 303 days	3 years, 303 days
9	Motilal Vora	INC	2 years, 338 days	3 years, 291 days
10	Mohan Yadav*	BJP	2 years, 338 days	2 years, 338 days
11	Sunderlal Patwa	BJP/JP	2 years, 285 days	2 years, 313 days
12	Virendra Sakhlecha	JP	2 years, 2 days	2 years, 2 days
13	Govind Narayan Singh	SVD	1 year, 226 days	1 year, 226 days
14	Bhagwantrao Mandloi	INC	1 year, 202 days	1 year, 224 days
15	Babulal Gaur	BJP	1 year, 98 days	1 year, 98 days
16	Kamal Nath	INC	1 year, 97 days	1 year, 97 days
17	Uma Bharti	BJP	259 days	259 days
18	Kailash Chandra Joshi	JP	208 days	208 days
19	Nareshchandra Singh	SVD	13 days	13 days

== Footnotes ==
Oath of Secrecy

"I, [Name], do swear in the name of God / solemnly affirm that I will not directly or indirectly communicate or reveal to any person or persons any matter which shall be brought under my consideration or shall become known to me as a Minister for the State of [Name of State] except as may be required for the due discharge of my duties as such Minister."Pad ki Shapath (Oath of Office) "Main, [CM ka Naam], Ishwar ki shapath leta hoon / satyanishtha se pratigyan karta hoon ki main vidhi dwara sthapit Bharat ke Samvidhan ke prati sachi shraddha aur nishtha rakhunga. Main Bharat ki prabhuta aur akhandta akshunn rakhunga. Main [State ka Naam] ke Rajya ke Mukhya Mantri ke roop mein apne kartavyon ka shraddhapoorvak aur shuddh antahkaran se nirvahan karunga, tatha main bhay ya pakshpat, anurag ya dwesh ke bina, sabhi prakar ke logon ke prati Samvidhan aur vidhi ke anusar nyay karunga." B. Gopniyata ki Shapath (Oath of Secrecy) "Main, [CM ka Naam], Ishwar ki shapath leta hoon / satyanishtha se pratigyan karta hoon ki jo vishay [State ka Naam] ke Rajya ke Mukhya Mantri ke roop mein mere vichar ke liye laya jayega athva mujhe gyaat hoga, use kisi vyakti ya vyaktityon ko, tab ke sivay jab ki aise Mukhya Mantri ke roop mein apne kartavyon ke uchit nirvahan ke liye aisa karna apekshit ho, main pratyaksh (directly) ya apratyaksh (indirectly) roop mein sansuchit ya prakat nahi karunga."
