= Abdul Jaleel Faridi =

Indian socialist politician (1913 – 1974)

Mohammad Abdul Jaleel Faridi

Member of the Uttar Pradesh Legislative Council
- In office 1952–1964

Personal details
- Born: Mohammad Abdul Jaleel; 14 December 1913 Lucknow
- Party: All India Muslim Majlis (Dr. Faridi); All India Muslim Majlis-e-Mushawarat
- Other political affiliations: Praja Socialist Party; Samyukta Vidhayak Dal

Mohammad Abdul Jaleel Faridi (14 December 1913 – 19 May 1974) popularly known as Dr. Faridi was an Indian physician, freedom fighter, socialist, politician and social worker. He was the founder of Qaed, an Urdu daily. He was the founder of All India Muslim Majlis (Dr. Faridi), a political party founded in 1968 following a split in Samyukta Vidhayak Dal.

Faridi, along with Syed Mahmud, a congress-man from Bihar founded the All India Muslim Majlis-e-Mushawarat, an umbrella body of Muslim organisations in 1964 after being attracted to Jawaharlal Nehru's policy.

== Career ==
Faridi was a medical practitioner who turned into the freedom struggle and then politics. He joined Praja Socialist Party in 1951, later he left the party in 1960s after serving as the leader of legislative council for the party.

He left Praja Socialist Party and joined hands with Dr. Syed Mahmud to form All India Muslim Majlis-e-Mushawarat in 1968. He also led a meeting of Dalit and Muslim in the same year, which was attended by Periyar and other Dalit leaders. He also led the All-India Muslim Political Convention at New Delhi in December 1971.

== Awards ==
- Lifetime Achievement Award by All India Majlis-e-Mushawarat (2022)

== Legacy ==
United Muslim of India and Urdu Development Organization gives the Award namely Dr. Abdul Jaleel Faridi Lifetime Achievement Award singe 1997 on Urdu Day.
