= Pt. Sambhunath University =

State university in Shahdol, India

Pandit S. N. Shukla University
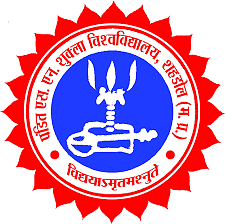
- Motto: vidyayā amṛtam aśnute
- Motto in English: "the Knowledge enjoys Immortality"
- Type: Public
- Established: 2016
- Affiliations: UGC
- Vice-Chancellor: Prof. Ram Shankar
- Faculty: >100
- Students: 5000
- Location: Shahdol, Madhya Pradesh, India; 23.2976790°N 81.3510179°E
- Campus: Urban

Pandit S. N. Shukla University is an institution of higher education located in Shahdol, Madhya Pradesh, India. It is a State university founded in 2016 by Government of Madhya Pradesh. It is affiliated under University Grants Commission (UGC).

== History ==
Established in 1956, Govt. Pandit Shambhunath Shukla College, Shahdol was affiliated To Awadesh Pratap Singh University, Rewa till 2016. After that it has been made a university. It is named after Indian independence activist and former chief minister of Vindhya Pradesh Shri S.N. Shukla.

== Campus ==
Currently, the campus is located in the city spread across 26 acres with a sports facility, boy's hostel, well-equipped laboratories, libraries and a complete WIFI coverage. The new 50 acres university campus building has been inaugurated by the Governor of Madhya Pradesh at Village Nawalpur in Shahdol district

=== Location ===
The current campus of 26 acres is situated nearby Kotwali Thana, Shahdol and it is about 2.7 km and 2.5 km from New Bus Stand, Shahdol and Railway Station, Shahdol respectively.

The New 50 acres University Campus Building is situated nearby Nawalpur Village about 11 km and 12 km from New Bus Stand, Shahdol and Railway Station, Shahdol respectively.

== Academic ==
The university is structured into the following academic divisions:

1. Physics
2. Mathematics
3. Bio-Technology
4. Computer Science
5. Botany
6. Chemistry
7. Bio-Chemistry
8. Biology
9. Geology
10. English
11. Hindi
12. Zoology
