= Junnardeo Assembly constituency =

Constituency of the Madhya Pradesh legislative assembly in India

Coordinates: 22.19°N 78.59°E

Junnardeo
- Constituency No. 122 for the Madhya Pradesh Legislative Assembly

Constituency details
- Country: India
- Region: Central India
- State: Madhya Pradesh
- District: Chhindwara
- Lok Sabha constituency: Chhindwara
- Established: 2008
- Reservation: ST

Member of Legislative Assembly
- 16th Madhya Pradesh Legislative Assembly
- Incumbent Sunil Uikey
- Party: Indian National Congress
- Elected year: 2023
- Preceded by: Nathan Shah Kevreti

Junnardeo is one of the 230 Vidhan Sabha (Legislative Assembly) constituencies of Madhya Pradesh state in central India.

It was established in 2008, and comprises Jamai tehsil and parts of Tamia tehsil, both in Chhindwara district. As of 2023, it is represented by Sunil Uikey of the Indian National Congress party.

== Members of the Legislative Assembly ==
Election	Name	Party
2008	Tejilal Saryam	Indian National Congress
2013	Nathan Shah Kevreti	Bharatiya Janata Party
2018	Sunil Uikey	Indian National Congress
2023	Sunil Uikey	Indian National Congress

== Election results ==
=== 2023 ===
2023 Madhya Pradesh Legislative Assembly election: Junnardeo
Party	Candidate	Votes	%	±%
INC	Sunil Uikey	83,377	43.72	−1.98
BJP	Nathan Shah Kevreti	80,167	42.03	+9.53
Independent	Jhamaklal Saryam	8,570	4.49	
GGP	Hariram Sallam	4,978	2.61	−8.66
Rashtriya Gondvana Party	Prakash Kumre	2,767	1.45	
Independent	Sumarsing Darsma (Mawasi)	2,490	1.31	
NOTA	None of the above	5,086	2.67	−0.96
Majority		3,210	1.69	−11.51
Turnout		190,717	86.0	+2.88
INC hold		Swing		

=== 2018 ===
2018 Madhya Pradesh Legislative Assembly election: Junnardeo
Party	Candidate	Votes	%	±%
INC	Sunil Uikey	78,573	45.7	
BJP	Ashish Jhanaklal Thakur	55,885	32.5	
GGP	Jhamak Lal Saryam	19,369	11.27	
AAP	Kalang Sing Uike	3,482	2.03	
Independent	Mohan Uikey	2,398	1.39	
BSP	Rajusingh Kayda	2,109	1.23	
NOTA	None of the above	6,245	3.63	
Majority		22,688	13.2	
Turnout		171,933	83.12	
INC gain from		Swing		
