= Shaheed Mahendra Karma Vishwavidyalaya =

University in Chhattisgarh

- Former name: Bastar Vishwavidyalaya
- Type: State University
- Established: 2008; 18 years ago
- Chancellor: Governor of Chhattisgarh
- Vice-Chancellor: Manoj Kumar Srivastava
- Location: Jagdalpur, Chhattisgarh, India; 19.099°N 81.987°E
- Website: smkvbastar.ac.in

Shaheed Mahendra Karma Vishwavidyalaya - (formerly Bastar Vishwavidyalaya) (SMKV) or Bastar University , is a State university located in Jagdalpur, Chhattisgarh, India. It is a teaching-cum-affiliating university which affiliates 30 college and has 10 University Teaching Departments (UTD). It was established and incorporated by Chhattisgarh Vishwavidyalaya Adhiniyam No. 18 of 2008 on September 2, 2008.

== Affiliated colleges ==
Its jurisdiction extends over 7 districts -Bastar, Bijapur, Dantewada, Kanker, Kondagaon, Narayanpur, Sukma .

== Departments ==
The university has eleven teaching departments:

- School of Management Studies (SMS)
- School of Studies in Anthropology
- School of Studies in Biotechnology
- School of Studies in Computer Application
- School of Studies in Education
- School of Studies in English
- School of Studies in Forestry & Wildlife
- School of Studies in Physical Education
- School of Studies in Political Science
- School of Studies in Rural Technology
- School of Studies in Social Work
