= Raichandbhai Shah =

Indian politician

Member of Parliament, Lok Sabha
- In office 1952–1957
- Constituency: Chhindwara

Personal details
- Born: 17 October 1917 Gagwa district, India
- Party: Congress
- Spouse: Savita
- Children: 4

Raichandbhai N. Shah was an Indian politician and a member of Parliament in the 1st Lok Sabha. He represented Chhindwara constituency and was affiliated with the Indian National Congress.

== Biography ==
Shah was born in Gagwa district, Jamnagar (Saurashtra) on 17 October 1917 to Narshibhai Shah. He obtained his education from Government High School, Betul, Madhya Pradesh.

He participated in various nationwide movements against the British India rule, including in 1941 Civil Disobedience Movement for which he was imprisoned for 6 months, the Quit India Movement in 1942 for which he was imprisoned for 14 months.

He served as vice chairperson of the Kasturba Gandhi National Memorial Trust for Chhindwara district, president Municipal Committee, Pandhurna in 1947, chair of Bangaon Nyay Panchayat in 1948 and district vice president of Gandhi National Memorial Fund Committee, Chhindwara.
