= Nakul Nath =

Indian politician

Nakul Kamal Nath

Member of Parliament, Lok Sabha
- In office 23 May 2019 – 4 June 2024
- Preceded by: Kamal Nath
- Succeeded by: Vivek Kumar Sahu
- Constituency: Chhindwara, Madhya Pradesh

Personal details
- Born: 21 June 1974 (age 51) Kolkata, West Bengal, India
- Party: Indian National Congress
- Spouse: Priya Nath (m. 2016)
- Parents: Kamal Nath (father); Alka Nath (mother)
- Education: The Doon School; Bay State College; Boston University

Nakul Kamal Nath (born 21 June 1974; Hindi pronunciation: [n̪əkʊl kəməl n̪aːt̪ʰ]) is an Indian politician. He was elected to the Lok Sabha, the lower house of the Parliament of India from Chhindwara, Madhya Pradesh in the 2019 Indian general election as member of the Indian National Congress (INC).

He is the son of INC politician Kamal Nath, former Chief Minister of Madhya Pradesh, a central Indian state. He was the richest MP in the 17th Lok Sabha with assets worth 660 crore.

In 2024 Lok Sabha Election Nath was defeated by BJP's Vivek Kumar Sahu with the margin of 113618 votes.

== Education ==
Nath went to The Doon School in Dehradun, followed by Bay State College in Boston, and later he pursued an MBA at Boston University.
