= Dinesh Nandan Sahay =

Indian politician and police officer

Dinesh Nandan Sanhay
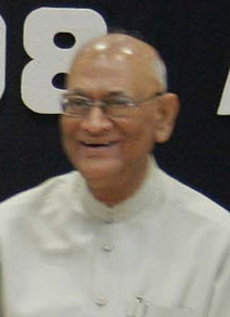
- Dinesh Nandan Sahay in 2008

10th Governor of Tripura
- In office 2 June 2003 – 14 October 2009
- Chief Minister: Manik Sarkar
- Preceded by: Krishna Mohan Seth
- Succeeded by: Kamla Beniwal

1st Governor of Chhattisgarh
- In office 1 November 2000 – 1 June 2003
- Chief Minister: Ajit Jogi
- Preceded by: Office Established
- Succeeded by: Krishna Mohan Seth

Personal details
- Born: 2 February 1936 Madhepur, Bengal Presidency, British India (Now Bihar, India)
- Died: 28 January 2018 (aged 81) Patna, Bihar, India
- Party: Samata Party
- Spouse: Manju Sanjay
- Children: 3
- Parents: Deva Nandan Sahay (father); Kishori Devi (mother)

Dinesh Nandan Sahay (2 February 1936 – 28 January 2018), also known as D.N. Sahay, was a police officer turned politician who served as DGP of Bihar and later as the Governor of Tripura and the first Governor of Chhattisgarh.

== Early life and career ==
He was born in Madhepura, Bihar in a middle-class Chitraguptavanshi Kayastha family to mother late Kishori Devi and father late Deva Nandan Sahay and was raised in Patna. He completed his M.A. in English literature and started his career as a lecturer in the H.D. College of Arrah before joining Indian Police Service in 1960. Thereafter, he served as the DGP of Bihar state (India).

== Later life ==
After retirement, he joined the Samata Party. He was the first governor of Chhattisgarh state from 2000 to 2003. He became Governor of Tripura in June 2003. He continued on this post till 2009. Yet traditionally governors serve for five years' tenure, Sahay served one year more than a typical governor's tenure. He is the father-in-law of current DGP of Bihar, Alok Raj.
