= Kalinga Ratna Award =

Education award in Odisha, India

Kalinga Ratna Award is an education award established the since 2007. It is awarded annually to a qualified Odisha person who has made a significant contribution to any field at the national/international level.

== Recipients ==
- Biswabhusan Harichandan
