= Vijay Revnath Chore =

Indian politician

Member of Madhya Pradesh Legislative Assembly
- Incumbent
- Assumed office 2018
- Preceded by: Nana Mohod
- Constituency: Saunsar

Personal details
- Political party: Indian National Congress
- Profession: Politician

Vijay Revnath Chore is an Indian politician from Madhya Pradesh. He is a two time elected Member of the Madhya Pradesh Legislative Assembly from 2018 and 2023, representing Saunsar Assembly constituency as a Member of the Indian National Congress.

== See also ==
- List of chief ministers of Madhya Pradesh
- Madhya Pradesh Legislative Assembly
