= Saunsar Assembly constituency =

Constituency of the Madhya Pradesh legislative assembly in India

Coordinates: 21.65°N 78.80°E

Saunsar
- Constituency No. 125 for the Madhya Pradesh Legislative Assembly

Constituency details
- Country: India
- Region: Central India
- State: Madhya Pradesh
- District: Chhindwara
- Lok Sabha constituency: Chhindwara
- Established: 1977
- Reservation: None

Member of Legislative Assembly
- 16th Madhya Pradesh Legislative Assembly
- Incumbent Vijay Revnath Chore
- Party: Indian National Congress
- Elected year: 2023
- Preceded by: Nana Mohod

Saunsar Assembly constituency is one of the 230 Vidhan Sabha (Legislative Assembly) constituencies of Madhya Pradesh state in central India.

It comprises Saunsar tehsil and parts of Chhindwara tehsil, both in Chhindwara district.

== Members of the Legislative Assembly ==
Election	Name	Party
2008	Nana Mohod	Bharatiya Janata Party
2013	Nana Mohod	Bharatiya Janata Party
2018	Vijay Revnath Chore	Indian National Congress
2023	Vijay Revnath Chore	Indian National Congress

== Election results ==
=== 2023 ===
2023 Madhya Pradesh Legislative Assembly election: Saunsar
Party	Candidate	Votes	%	±%
INC	Vijay Revnath Chore	92,509	49.95	−1.17
BJP	Nanabhau Mohod	80,967	43.72	+4.67
BSP	Panjabrao Somkuwar	1,762	0.95	−0.58
NOTA	None of the above	2,422	1.31	+0.97
Majority		11,542	6.23	−5.84
Turnout		185,191	88.0	+0.69
INC hold		Swing		

=== 2018 ===
2018 Madhya Pradesh Legislative Assembly election: Saunsar
Party	Candidate	Votes	%	±%
INC	Vijay Revnath Chore	86,700	51.12	
BJP	Nanabhau Mohod	66,228	39.05	
BSP	Anil Gurve	2,596	1.53	
Independent	Praveen Leeladhar Balang	2,325	1.37	
GGP	Kawdeti Rameshwar	1,892	1.12	
Independent	Matin Mustak Khan	1,766	1.04	
NOTA	None of the above	577	0.34	
Majority		20,472	12.07	
Turnout		169,603	87.31	
INC gain from		Swing		
