= Chandrabhan Singh Chaudhary =

Indian politician

Chaudhary Chandrabhan Singh

Member of the Madhya Pradesh Legislative Assembly
- In office 1990–1993
- Constituency: Chhindwara
- In office 2003–2008
- Constituency: Chhindwara
- In office 2013–2018
- Constituency: Chhindwara

Chandrabhan Singh Chaudhary is an Indian politician and a former member of Madhya Pradesh Legislative Assembly. He was elected to the assembly from Chhindwara as a candidate of Bharatiya Janata Party in 2013. He passed B.com in 1980 and L.L.B in 1983 from Dr. Hari Singh Gour University. He has contested 1991, 1996 and 2014 Lok Sabha election from Chhindwara against Kamal Nath, a minister and was defeated. In 1996, he faced Kamal Nath's wife Alka Nath.
