= Biswabhusan Harichandan =

Indian politician (born 1934)

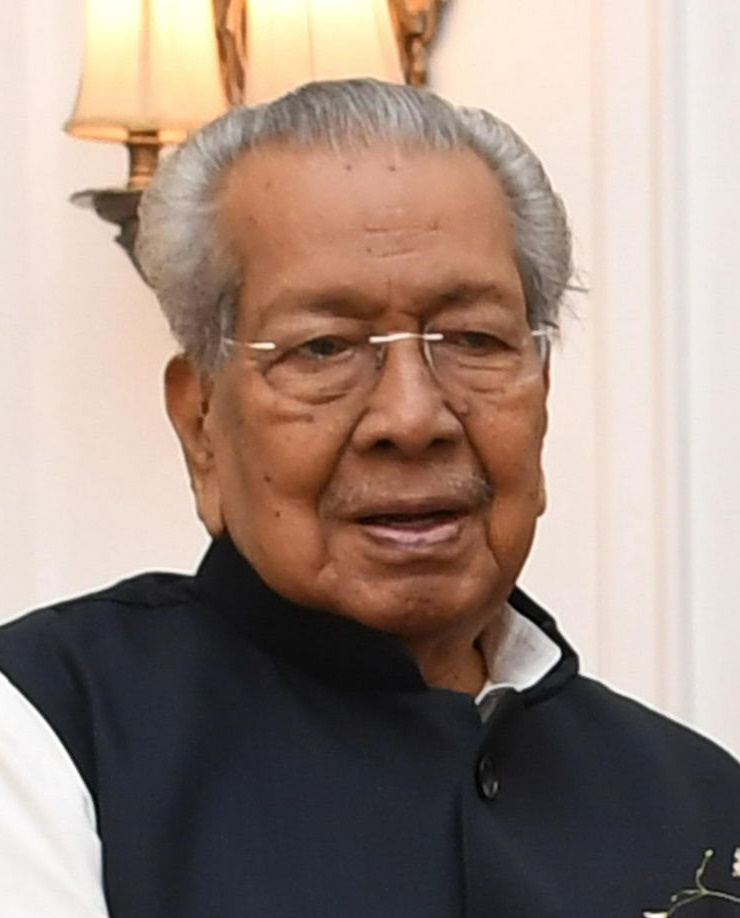
- Harichandan in 2023

7th Governor of Chhattisgarh
- In office 23 February 2023 – 29 July 2024
- Chief Minister: Bhupesh Baghel; Vishnu Deo Sai
- Preceded by: Anusuiya Uikey
- Succeeded by: Ramen Deka

21st Governor of Andhra Pradesh
- In office 24 July 2019 – 22 February 2023
- Chief Minister: Y. S. Jaganmohan Reddy
- Preceded by: E. S. L. Narasimhan
- Succeeded by: Syed Abdul Nazeer

Cabinet Minister of Law, Revenue and Fisheries Government of Odisha
- In office 2004–2009
- Chief Minister: Naveen Patnaik

Member of Odisha Legislative Assembly
- In office 1997–2009
- Constituency: Bhubaneswar
- In office 1990–1995
- Constituency: Chilika
- In office 1977–1980
- Constituency: Chilika

Personal details
- Born: 3 August 1934 (age 91)
- Party: Bharatiya Janata Party
- Other political affiliations: Bharatiya Jana Sangha; Janata Party; Janata Dal
- Spouse: Suprava Harichandan
- Children: Prithviraj Harichandan (son)
- Occupation: Politician; lawyer; writer
- Awards: Kalinga Ratna Award, 2021

Biswabhusan Harichandan (born 3 August 1934) is an Indian politician who served as the 7th Governor of Chhattisgarh. He was former Governor of Andhra Pradesh from 2019 to early 2023.

From 2004 to 2009, he was Minister of Law, Revenue and Fisheries for the Government of Odisha.

== Life and career ==
Harichandan joined Bharatiya Jana Sangha in 1971 and became its National Executive Member and its State General Secretary until the formation of the Janata Party in 1977. During the era of emergency, he was detained under the MISA. After the formation of the BJP in 1980, he was appointed President of the state until 1988 before joining hands with the Janata Dal. He went back to the BJP in 1996.

Harichandan was elected to the Odisha State Legislative Assembly five times. Beginning from the 1977 assembly elections from Chilika Assembly constituency as a member of BJP, he came back to power in 1990 with a Janata Dal ticket. Harichandan was elected for the third time, this time from Bhubaneswar seat in the by-poll elections of 1997, and continued to be a member from the same constituency three times in a row. He was also a cabinet minister in the BJD-BJP led coalition government in 2004, where he was the Minister of Law, Revenue and Fisheries.

In July 2019, he was appointed the 23rd Governor of Andhra Pradesh.

Harichandan was sworn in as the 7th Governor of Chhattisgarh on 23 February 2023.

== Personal life ==
On 17 November 2021, Harichandan was diagnosed with COVID-19. In June 2024, his son Prithviraj Harichandan became the Minister of Law, Works, Excise in the Mohan Charan Majhi Cabinet.

== Awards ==
Harichandan was awarded the Kalinga Ratna Award in 2021.

== Books ==
Harichandan has authored several books some of which include Marubataas, Mahasangramar Mahanayak, Buxi Jagabandhu, Paika Mutiny ,his autobiography Sangarsha Sarinahin and A Mati Katha Kahe.

Political offices
Preceded by E. S. L. Narasimhan	Governor of Andhra Pradesh; 24 July 2019 – 22 February 2023	Succeeded by Syed Abdul Nazeer
Preceded by Anusuiya Uikey	Governor of Chhattisgarh; 23 February 2023 – 30 July 2024	Succeeded by Ramen Deka
