= List of governors of Chhattisgarh =

Head of state in state of Chhattisgarh

Governor of Chhattisgarh
- Emblem of Chhattisgarh

- Flag of India

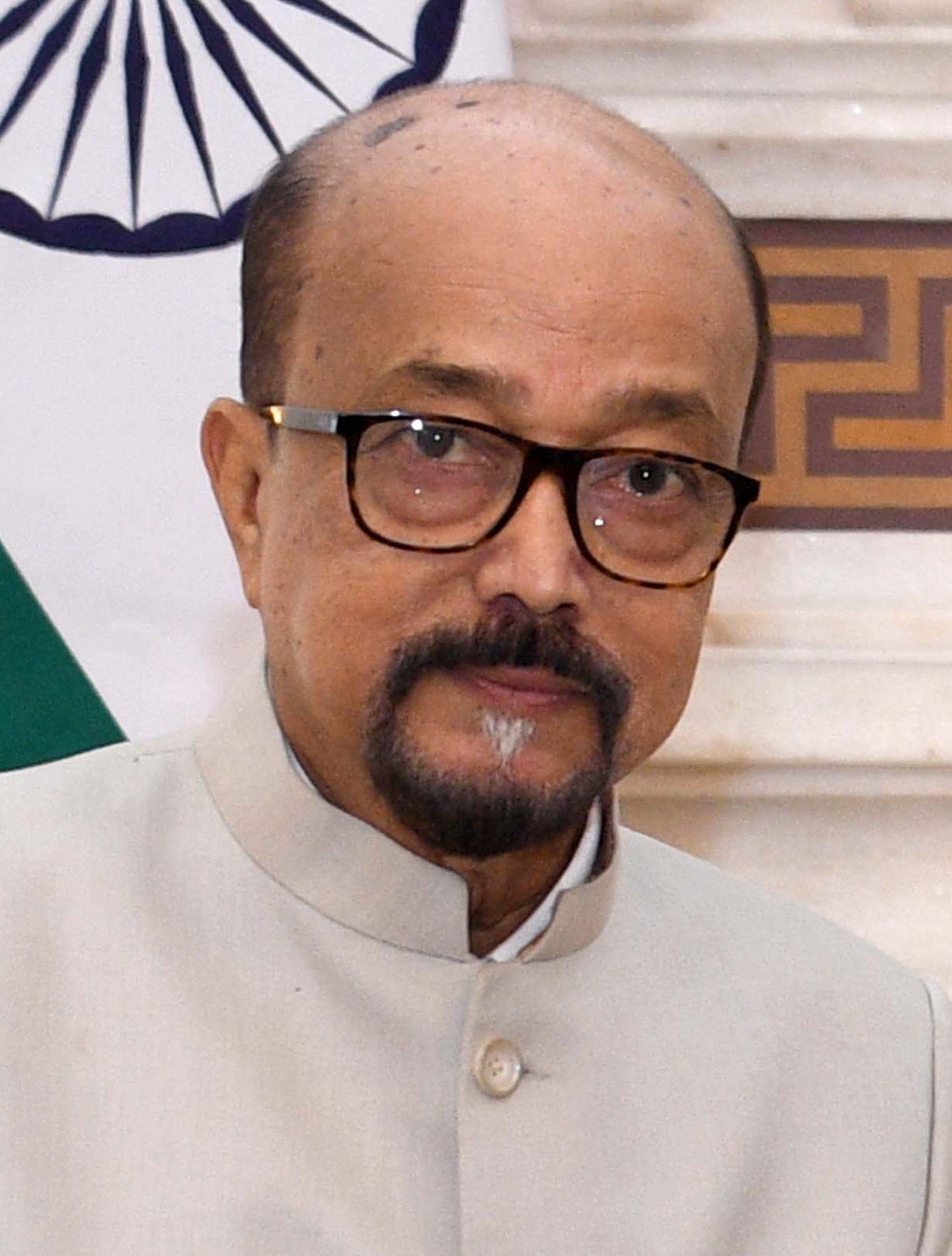
- Incumbent; Ramen Deka since 31 July 2024
- Style: His Excellency
- Residence: Lok Bhavan; Raipur
- Appointer: President of India
- Term length: At the pleasure of the president
- Inaugural holder: D. N. Sahay
- Formation: 1 November 2000; 25 years ago

The governor of Chhattisgarh is the nominal head of state of the Indian state of Chhattisgarh. The governor is appointed by the president of India. The official residence of the governor is Lok Bhavan.

The position of the governor of Chhattisgarh came into existence following the creation of the state in November 2000 as a result of the bifurcation of Madhya Pradesh. The first governor to be appointed was Dinesh Nandan Sahay who served in office between 2000 and 2003. The current governor is Ramen Deka who has been in office since 31 July 2024. A total of 10 governors has served in the state.

== Powers and functions ==
Chhattisgarh is in central India.

The governor enjoys many different types of powers:

- Executive powers related to administration, appointments and removals,
- Legislative powers related to lawmaking and the state legislature, that is Vidhan Sabha or Vidhan Parishad, and
- Discretionary powers to be carried out according to the discretion of the governor.

Apart from enjoying various constitutional powers, the governor of Chhattisgarh is the ex-officio Chancellor of the state universities of Chhattisgarh. The universities include Atal Bihari Vajpayee Vishwavidyalaya, Pt. Deendayal Upadhyay Memorial Health Sciences and Ayush University of Chhattisgarh, Bastar Vishwavidyalaya, Chhattisgarh Kamdhenu Vishwavidyalaya, Hemchand Yadav Vishwavidyalaya, Indira Kala Sangeet Vishwavidyalaya, Sarguja University, etc.

== Oath ==
I, A. B., do swear in the name of God/solemly affirm that I will faithfully execute the office of Governor (or discharge the functions of the Governor) of Chhattisgarh and will to the best of my ability preserve, protect and defend the Constitution and the law and that I will devote myself to the service and well-being of the people of Chhattisgarh.

Main, [Name], Ishwar ki shapath leta hoon (ya nishtha se pratigya karta hoon) ki main sachhe mann se Governor (Rajyapal) ke roop mein [State Name] ke pad ka karyabhar sambhalunga (ya zimmedari uthaunga).

Main apni poori kabiliyat se Samvidhan (Constitution) aur kanoon (Law) ki raksha, suraksha aur bachaav karunga, aur main apne aap ko [State Name] ki janta ki seva aur kalyan (well-being) mein samarpit karunga."

== History ==
The inaugural governor of Chhattisgarh was retired Indian Police Service officer and former Bihar DGP Dinesh Nandan Sahay who served in office since the state's creation in November 2000 until he swapped positions with then Governor of Tripura Lieutenant General Krishna Mohan Seth (retired) in June 2003.Seth served in office until retiring in January 2007 and was succeeded by former Intelligence Bureau director E. S. L. Narasimhan. Narasimhan served as the state's governor until being permanently transferred as Governor of Andhra Pradesh in January 2010, a position he was holding on additional basis since December 2009 following the resignation of N. D. Tiwari. Following the transfer of Narasimhan, former Defence Secretary Shekhar Dutt was appointed as the governor and he remained in office until resigning in June 2014.

Following Dutt's resignation, Madhya Pradesh governor Ram Naresh Yadav briefly acted as the state's governor. He was relieved of the additional duties following the appointment of Balram Das Tandon the following month. Tandon remained the governor until his demise in office on 14 August 2018, thus becoming the first and only sitting governor of the state to die in office. He was succeeded by Madhya Pradesh governor Anandiben Patel on acting basis who served till July the next year and was succeeded by Anusuiya Uikey. Uikey served as the state's governor until February 2023 and was transferred as Governor of Manipur and was succeeded by Andhra Pradesh governor Biswabhusan Harichandan. Till July 2024, Harichandan remained in office and was replaced by Ramen Deka. Since then, Deka has been the governor of the state.

== List ==
Legend

- ^{†} Died in office
- ^{§} Transferred
- ^{‡} Resigned
- indicates acting/additional charge

#	Portrait	Governor (lifespan)	Home state	Tenure in office			Appointer (President)
#	Portrait	Governor (lifespan)	Home state	Assumed office	Demitted office	Time in office	Appointer (President)
1		Dinesh Nandan Sahay; IPS (Retd) (1936–2018)	Bihar	1 November 2000	1 June 2003^{[§]} (Note: Transferred as the Governor of Tripura)	2 years, 212 days	K. R. Narayanan
2		Lieutenant General; Krishna Mohan Seth (Retd); PVSM AVSM (born 1939)	Uttar Pradesh	2 June 2003	25 January 2007	3 years, 237 days	A. P. J. Abdul Kalam
3		E. S. L. Narasimhan; IPS (Retd) (born 1945)	Tamil Nadu	26 January 2007	23 January 2010^{[§]} (Note: Transferred as the Governor of Andhra Pradesh)	2 years, 362 days	A. P. J. Abdul Kalam
4		Shekhar Dutt; SM IAS (Retd) (1945–2025)	Assam	23 January 2010	19 June 2014^{[‡]}	4 years, 147 days	Pratibha Patil
5		Ram Naresh Yadav (1928–2016) (Additional charge)	Uttar Pradesh	19 June 2014	14 July 2014	25 days	Pranab Mukherjee
6		Balram Das Tandon (1927–2018)	Punjab	18 July 2014	14 August 2018^{[†]}	4 years, 27 days	Pranab Mukherjee
7		Anandiben Patel (born 1941) (Additional charge)	Gujarat	15 August 2018	28 July 2019^{[§]} (Note: Transferred as the Governor of Uttar Pradesh)	347 days	Ram Nath Kovind
8		Anusuiya Uikey (born 1957)	Madhya Pradesh	29 July 2019	22 February 2023^{[§]} (Note: Transferred as the Governor of Manipur)	3 years, 208 days	Ram Nath Kovind
9		Biswabhusan Harichandan (born 1934)	Odisha	23 February 2023	31 July 2024	1 year, 159 days	Droupadi Murmu
10		Ramen Deka (born 1954)	Assam	31 July 2024	Incumbent	2 years, 74 days	Droupadi Murmu

== See also ==
- Governors of India
- Powers and functions of the governors of India
