= Vivek Kumar Sahu =

Indian politician

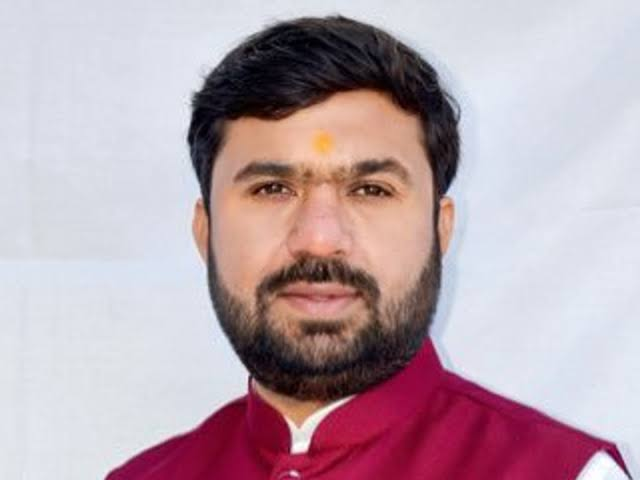

Member of Parliament, Lok Sabha
- Incumbent
- Assumed office 4 June 2024
- Preceded by: Nakul Nath
- Constituency: Chhindwara

Personal details
- Born: 29 April 1979 (age 46) Chhindwara, Madhya Pradesh, India
- Party: Bharatiya Janata Party
- Spouse: Shalini Sahu
- Children: 1 Son
- Parent(s): Narendra Kumar Sahu (Father), Shashi Sahu (Mother)
- Occupation: Politician

Vivek ‘Bunty’ Sahu (Hindi pronunciation: [ʋɪʋeːk kʊmaːɾ saːɦuː]) is an Indian politician from Chindwara, Madhya Pradesh. He was elected as a Member of Parliament from Chhindwara Lok Sabha constituency. He belongs to Bharatiya Janata Party. In 2024 Lok Sabha election Sahu won with the margin of 113618 votes.
