= Ramen Deka =

Indian politician (born 1954)

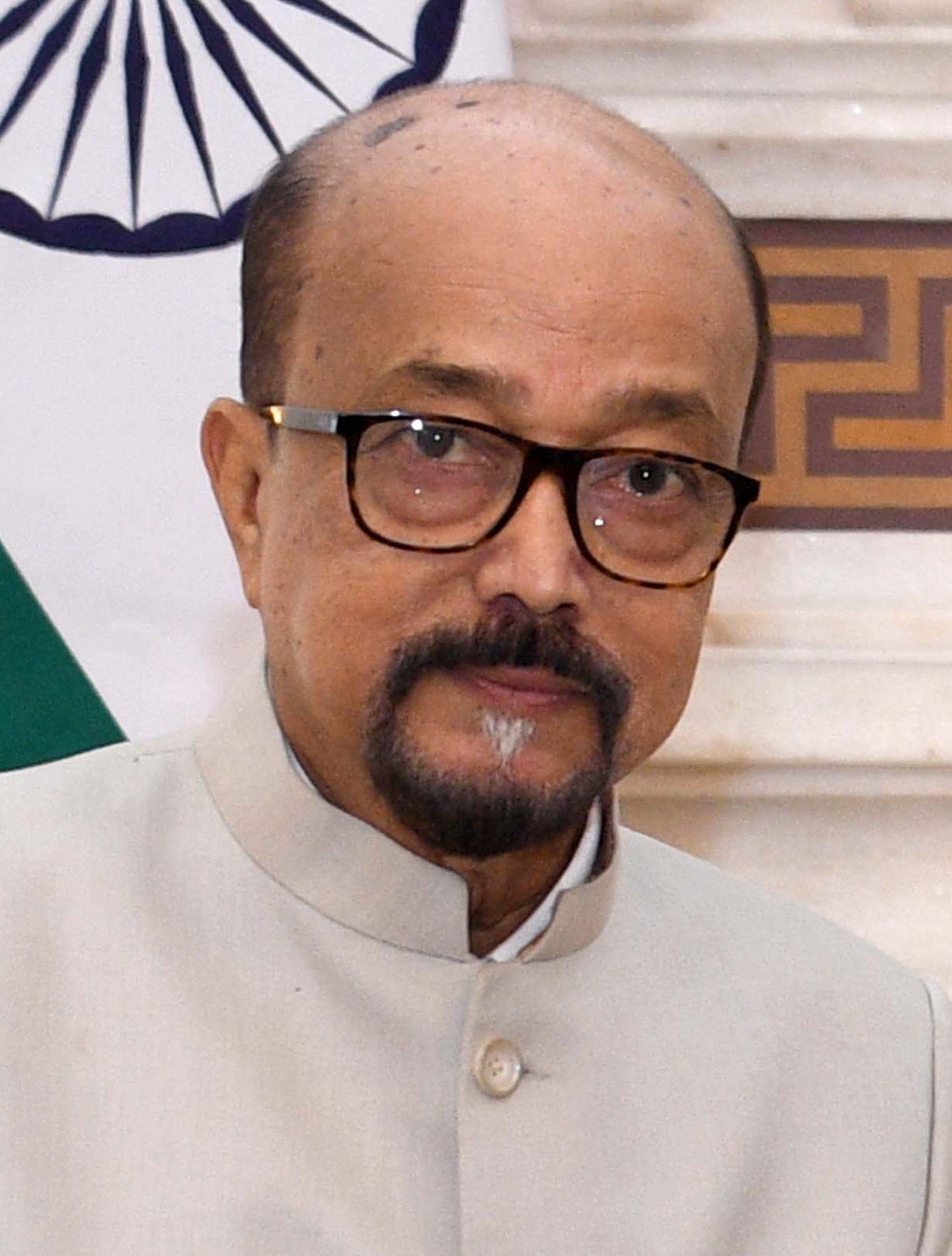

Governor of Chhattisgarh
- Incumbent
- Assumed office 31 July 2024
- Chief Minister: Vishnu Deo Sai
- Preceded by: Biswabhusan Harichandan

Member of Parliament, Lok Sabha
- In office 16 May 2009 – 23 May 2019
- Preceded by: Narayan Chandra Borkataky
- Succeeded by: Dilip Saikia
- Constituency: Mangaldoi, Assam

Personal details
- Born: 1 March 1954 (age 72) Sualkuchi, Assam, India
- Party: Bharatiya Janata Party
- Spouse: Ranee Dekakakaty (m. 1989)
- Children: 2
- Education: University of Guwahati
- As of May, 2014

Ramen Deka (born 1 March 1954) is an Indian politician currently serving as the Governor of Chhattisgarh since July 2024. He is a member of Bharatiya Janata Party (BJP) and Member of Parliament, Lok Sabha in the 15th and 16th Lok Sabha, representing Mangaldoi. He is a former National Secretary of the BJP and President of the BJP Assam.

== Chhattisgarh Governor ==
Deka has appointed as Governor of Chhattisgarh by President Droupadi Murmu on 27 July 2024.
