= Shreenath Mehta =

Indian politician and independence activist

Shreenath N. Mehta was an Indian bureaucrat and politician. He was a member of the Imperial Civil Service. In his capacity as an ICS officer, he was appointed as the third Prime Minister of Vindhya Pradesh from April 1949 to 20 January 1950, and later its first Chief Commissioner from 1 January 1950 to 20 January 1950. After retirement from the ICS, he joined the Indian National Congress party in Madhya Pradesh. He was a member of the Rajya Sabha from 1952 to 1960.
