= Awadhesh Pratap Singh =

Indian independence activist and politician

Captain Kunwar Awadhesh Pratap Singh Baghel (born October 1888, Rampur Baghelan–died 16 June 1967, Kanpur) was an Indian politician and Indian independence activist.

Initially he was Captain in the army of Maharaja of Rewa (princely state) and later he became a member of the Indian National Congress party in Madhya Pradesh. He was a member of the Indian Constituent Assembly, the Provisional Parliament and the Rajya Sabha between 1952 and 1960. He became the Prime Minister of Rewa State in 1948 and the Chief Minister of Vindhya Pradesh from 1948 to 14 April 1949.

Singh was married to Maharaj Kumari and they had one son and one daughter. His son, Govind Narayan Singh, became the Chief Minister of Madhya Pradesh.

He died on 16 June 1967 in Kanpur. The Awadhesh Pratap Singh University in Rewa was named in his honour.
