= Sohanlal Valmik =

Indian politician

Member of the Madhya Pradesh Legislative Assembly
- Incumbent
- Assumed office 2013
- Preceded by: Tarachand Bawaria
- Constituency: Parasia

Personal details
- Born: 29 August 1963 (age 62)
- Citizenship: India
- Party: Indian National Congress
- Spouse: Radha Valmik
- Education: B.A.
- Alma mater: L.N. Pench Valley PG College, Chhindwara
- Profession: Politician
- As of 23 July, 2018 Source: ["Biography: Sohanlal Valmik" (PDF). Madhya Pradesh Legislative Assembly.]

Sohanlal Valmik is an Indian politician and a member of the Indian National Congress party from Madhya Pradesh.

== Political career ==
He became a member of the Madhya Pradesh Legislative Assembly (MLA) in 2013.

He has raised various issues in the MP Vidhan Sabha about the appointment of teachers in government schools.

He had also threatened to sit on Dharna.

He supports Congress Party's ideology.

== See also ==
- Madhya Pradesh Legislative Assembly
- 2013 Madhya Pradesh Legislative Assembly election
- 2008 Madhya Pradesh Legislative Assembly election
