= Alka Nath =

Indian politician (born 1951)

Member of Parliament, Lok Sabha
- In office 16 May 1996 – 19 March 1998
- Preceded by: Kamal Nath
- Succeeded by: Sundar Lal Patwa
- Constituency: Chhindwara, Madhya Pradesh

Personal details
- Born: Alka Paul; 24 November 1951 (age 74) Amritsar, Punjab, India
- Party: Indian National Congress
- Spouse: Kamal Nath (m. 1973)
- Children: 2 sons (including Nakul Nath)
- Education: B.A
- Alma mater: Sacred Heart College, Dalhousie
- Occupation: Artist, Politician
- As of 9 December, 2012 Source: []

Alka Nath (nee Paul; born 24 November 1951) is an Indian political and social worker and a former member of parliament elected from the Chhindwara constituency in the Indian state of Madhya Pradesh as an Indian National Congress candidate.

== Early life ==
Alka was born on 24 November 1951 in Amritsar. She married Kamal Nath on 27 January 1973 and has two sons Nakul Nath and Bakul Nath.

== Education ==
Alka completed her Bachelor of Arts from Sacred Heart College, Dalhousie (Himachal Pradesh).

== Career ==
Alka was elected to the 11th Lok Sabha in 1996.
