= Choudhary Sujeet Mersingh =

Indian politician

Member of Madhya Pradesh Legislative Assembly
- Incumbent
- Assumed office 2018
- Preceded by: Munnalal Goyal
- Constituency: Chourai

Personal details
- Political party: Indian National Congress
- Profession: Politician

Choudhary Sujeet Mersingh is an Indian politician from Madhya Pradesh. He is a two time elected Member of the Madhya Pradesh Legislative Assembly from 2018 and 2023, representing Chourai Assembly constituency as a Member of the Indian National Congress.

== See also ==
- 2023 Madhya Pradesh Legislative Assembly election
- Madhya Pradesh Legislative Assembly
