= S. N. Shukla =

Indian politician and independence activist (died 1978)

Sambhu Nath Shukla (c. 1903 – 21 October 1978) was an Indian politician and Indian independence activist. He was a member of the Indian National Congress party in Madhya Pradesh. He was a member of the Indian Constituent Assembly, the Provisional Parliament and the Rajya Sabha between 1952 and 1960. He became the Chief Minister of Vindhya Pradesh from 13 March 1952 to 31 October 1956 until house dissolved and Vindhya Pradesh became part of Madhya Pradesh.

Shukla also worked as minister of forest ministry in the government of Pandit Ravishankar Shukla. He was also elected as mp(1967-1971) from Rewa. The autonomous degree college (Pt. S.N. Shukla University) of Shahdol was named after him which is now a university.

Shukla died in Bhopal on 21 October 1978, at the age of 75.
