= K. Santhanam =

Indian politician

Kasturiranga Santhanam (1895 – 28 February 1980), also known as Kumitithadal Santhanam, was an Indian politician. He was from a Iyengar Brahmin Family from Tamil Nadu.

== Early life ==
Santhanam obtained a Master of Arts degree in mathematics from the University of Madras (St. Joseph's College, Trichy) and later a law degree from the Law College of Madras, now known as Chennai. He joined the Indian National Congress and participated in the Indian Independence Movement at a young age and was imprisoned once for that. He was a follower of Mahatma Gandhi and his wife died at the Gandhi Ashram, while he was in jail. From 1937 to 1942, he was a member of the Imperial Legislative Assembly, and from 1946 was a member of the Indian Constituent Assembly, from 1948 serving as Union Minister for Railways and Transport in Jawaharlal Nehru's cabinet. He stood as a Congress candidate for the House of the People from Mayuram (now known as Mayiladuthurai) in Tanjore district, but lost to a Communist candidate. In February 1952, he was appointed the Governor of Vindhya Pradesh.

== Santhanam committee ==
In 1964, Lal Bahadur Sastri appointed Santhanam to preside over the committee on anti-corruption. Because of its thorough investigative work and recommendations, the Committee earned a reputation as Santhanam's Committee on Anti-Corruption. In his 1976 'Code of Conduct for persons in power, authority or positions of trust in our country', he explicitly included ministers and members of Parliament and state legislatures. There should be no use of position for personal or family advantage, read his code; no actions motivated by considerations of party, religion, caste, or community; no unofficial dealings with businessmen or hospitality or gifts accepted from them or other private persons.

The Santhanam committee is credited with the creation of the Central Vigilance Commission in 1964 which was conferred statutory status in 2003.

== Contribution ==
Santhanam was also instrumental in shaping the politics in post-Independence Tamil Nadu, through his close association with Rajaji and Kamaraj. He served as the first editor of the Indian Express (1933–1940) and later worked as the joint editor of the Hindustan Times (1943–1948). He was well-versed in Tamil, Sanskrit, and English. His literary contributions are many. Most of Santhanam's work was published by Bharatiya Vidya Bhavan, including An Anthology of Indian Literature (1969), Gospel of Gandhi (1967), and British Imperialism and Indian Nationalism (1972). Santhanam also translated Kālidāsa's Shakuntala and Bhavabuti's Uttara Rama Charitam, both from Sanskrit.

== Personal life and death ==
Santhanam died in 1980 and was survived by three sons and a daughter, namely S.Kasthuri, the eldest and a distinguished marine engineer who retired as the first Director of Cochin Shipyard Ltd., Mrs. Lakshmi Srinivasan, a devout housewife, whose husband was a distinguished executive engineer in Tamil Nadu government, K.S. Rajagopalan, a noted international expert on electro-chemistry, corrosion theory and corrosion control and a prominent research director at the Central Electrochemical Research Institute, Karaikudi, Tamil Nadu and K.S. Ramanujan, a well known journalist who served as associate editor for Hindustan Times.

== See also ==
- Central Vigilance Commission
