= Harsh Singh (politician) =

Indian politician (born 1954)

Harsh Singh (born 24 June 1954) is an MLA of BJP from Rampur Baghelan (Satna). He won the election in 2013 for fourth time. He is minister of state in Shivraj Singh Chouhan's cabinet since 30 June 2016. He was elected first time in 1980 with the ticket of INC. Then he was also elected in 1985 and 2003. He is son of former chief minister of Madhya Pradesh, Govind Narayan Singh.
