= Indian National Congress (Requisitionists) =

Indian National Congress (R)
- Abbreviation: INC(R)
- Leader: Indira Gandhi
- Founded: 12 November 1969; 57 years ago
- Dissolved: 24 December 1978; 47 years ago^{(The camp was recognised as the Indian National Congress.)}
- Split from: Indian National Congress
- Succeeded by: Indian National Congress
- Ideology: Democratic socialism; Left-wing nationalism; Pro-Soviet sentiment; Secularism
- Political position: Centre-left to left-wing
- Colours: Turquoise

Election symbol

Indian National Congress (Requisitionists) was the leftist faction of the Indian National Congress led by Indira Gandhi, formed after the party split due to her expulsion in 1969.

The letter 'R' stands for 'Requisition'. The other faction of Congress party then became the Indian National Congress (Organisation), or Congress (O), and was led by Kamaraj. It was informally called the organisation Congress or Syndicate and retained the party symbol of a pair of bullocks carrying a yoke. Gandhi's breakaway faction were given a new symbol of a cow with suckling calf by the Election Commission as the party election symbol.

The split occurred when, in 1969, a united opposition under the banner of Samyukt Vidhayak Dal won control over several states in the Hindi belt.

Indira Gandhi, prime minister and daughter of Jawaharlal Nehru, was then challenged by the majority of the party leadership. Gandhi led the new faction to demonstrate her support amongst the people. In the 1971 general election, Congress (R) had secured an overwhelming majority winning 352 out of 518 seats in the Lok Sabha. The number of seats held by the Congress (O) fell from 65 to 16. The Election Commission recognised Indira Gandhi's group as the real Congress with the right to call itself the Indian National Congress without the suffix (R), and restored the frozen Congress symbol of two bullocks to it. But Indira Gandhi's supporters preferred the 'calf and cow' symbol that it had adopted after the 1969 split. In the elections to five state assemblies too, the Congress (R) performed well.

== In government ==
The Naxalbari uprising of 1967 made it imperative that the ruling class needed to address the concerns of small and middle peasantry against feudal interests. Indira Gandhi undertook structural reforms to boost middle-class among rural and urban areas as well to project her leftist credentials while simultaneously providing public sector financial aid to bourgeois industrialists.

The government had a major boost in support after winning the Indo-Pakistani war of 1971.

In 1972, general insurance and coal industry were nationalised even as a mixed economy was still followed.

Cheap foodgrains were distributed to the poor by government initiative while influence of businessmen in politics was curtailed by imposing ban on donations to parties through joint-stock companies.

On May 18, 1974, a significant breakthrough was achieved by the detonation of a nuclear device at Pokhran.

== Decline and legacy ==
Indira made the party into her own puppet organisation while economic malaise and unemployment started deepening. Suppression of railway strikes in 1974 led to fall in working-class support. Centralisation of power and increasing influence of business magnates (which led to more corruption) stoked protests in states like Gujarat and Bihar.

Sycophantic party leaders who promoted Indira Gandhi's cult of personality further contributed to the rot in leadership. The regime reached its absolute nadir with the disqualification of Indira and the subsequent proclamation of Emergency.

Leaders like Jagjivan Ram and Hemvati Nandan Bahuguna left the party as the Emergency became unpopular. Both went on to form Congress for Democracy on February 2, 1977, which eventually merged with Janata Party. In July 1977, Karnataka CM Devaraj Urs resigned and formed Congress (U).

The party was voted out of from power after the emergency was lifted and elections were conducted in 1977.

=== Indian National Congress (Indira) ===
In 1978, following the resignation of several leaders such as Nandini Satapathy, who criticised abuses during the Emergency, and amid internal contestation between Indira Gandhi’s nominee K. Brahmananda Reddy and Siddhartha Shankar Ray for the post of party president, Indira Gandhi broke away from Congress (R) to form Congress (Indira). Meanwhile, Congress (O) had earlier merged with parties such as the Bharatiya Jana Sangh and others to form the Janata Party, a broad anti-Congress nationalist political formation.

Ahead of the 1996 general election, Congress (I) dropped the suffix “Indira” from its registered name.

== See also ==
- Indian National Congress breakaway parties
- Indian National Congress
