= Samyukta Vidhayak Dal =

Indian coalition government

- Abbreviation: SVD
- ECI Status: Defunct (No current ECI status)

The Samyukta Vidhayak Dal (SVD, lit. 'United Legislators Party') was a coalition of parties formed in several north Indian states after the 1967 assembly elections, made up of the Bharatiya Kranti Dal, the Samyukta Socialist Party, the Praja Socialist Party and the Jana Sangh. The coalition opposed the Indian National Congress party that had hitherto single-handedly dominated Indian politics.

The 1967 Indian general election was a landmark election in the history of India. The ruling Congress Party was returned to power with the lowest majority it had had since independence (284 seats). It was defeated in assemblies like Bihar, Uttar Pradesh, Rajasthan, Punjab, West Bengal, Orissa, Madhya Pradesh, Madras, and Kerala. In many states in the north, where it had won narrow victories, its members defected to opposition parties. Consequently, the Congress governments fell and they were replaced by Samyukta Vidhayak Dal (SVD) governments. This was a coalition of legislators against the Congress - made up Jana Sangh, Socialists, Swantantra Party and Congress defectors, beside local parties.

== First non-Congress government in Uttar Pradesh ==
The first non-Congress government in Uttar Pradesh was formed on 3 April 1967 by SVD coalition with Charan Singh as its Chief Minister. Bharatiya Jana Sangh was major constituent in this coalition with 98 MLAs, followed by Samyukta Socialist Party having 44 MLAs, Jan Congress having 21 MLAs, Communist Party of India having 14 MLAs, Swatantra Party having 12 MLAs, Praja Socialist Party having 11 MLAs, Republican party having 9 MLAs, Communist Party of India (Marxist) having 1 MLAs and 22 Independent MLAs.

One of the constituent of SVD coalition, Samyukta Socialist Party wanted to completely abolish the land revenue or at least on uneconomic lands. But Charan Singh did not want to abolish it as he was worried about the resources. Another constituent in the SVD coalition, Praja Socialist Party called for the release of government employees held in preventive detention for their strikes but Charan Singh refused to budge on this matter and instead succeeded in breaking the strike.

On 24 July 1967, Chandra Bhanu Gupta moved a no-confidence motion against the SVD government, but the government survived. The disagreement between Charan Singh and Samyukta Socialist Party became public when SSP decided to launch an agitation of Angrezi Hatao (get rid to English) and during this movement two of its ministers courted arrest. The SSP withdrew from the coalition on 5 January 1968. On 17 February 1968, Charan Singh submitted his resignation to the governor Bezawada Gopala Reddy and on 25 February 1968, President's rule was imposed on Uttar Pradesh.
