= Vindhya Pradesh =

Former State of India (1948–1956)

Coordinates: 24.53°N 81.3°E

Union of Baghelkhand and Bundelkhand States (1948–1950) Vindhya Pradesh (1950–1956)
- State of India
- 1948–1956
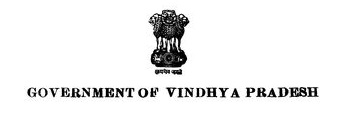
- Coat of arms

- 1951 map of India. Vindhya Pradesh is shown in the centre.
- Capital: Rewa
- Area
- 61,131.5 km^{2} (23,603.0 sq mi)
- Population
- 3,600,000
- History
  - Creation of Vindhya Pradesh State: 1948
  - States Reorganisation Act: 1956
| Preceded by | Succeeded by |
| Central India Agency | Madhya Pradesh |
- Pranab Kumar Bhattacharyya (1977). Historical Geography of Madhya Pradesh from Early Records. Delhi: Motilal Banarsidass. pp. 54–5.

Vindhya Pradesh was a former state of India. It was created in 1948 as Union of Baghelkhand and Bundelkhand States from the territories of the princely states in the eastern portion of the former Central India Agency. It was named as Vindhya Pradesh on 25 January 1950 after the Vindhya Range, which runs through the centre of the province. The capital of the state was the former princely state of Rewa. It lay between Uttar Pradesh to the north and Madhya Pradesh to the south, and the enclave of Datia, which lay a short distance to the west, was surrounded by the state of Madhya Bharat.

Vindhya Pradesh was merged into Madhya Pradesh in 1956, following the States Reorganisation Act.

It occupied an area of 61,131.5 km2 (23,603 sq. miles).

== History ==
Vindhya Pradesh state was formed on 12 March 1948 and inaugurated on 4 April 1948. 36 princely states were merged to form Vindhya Pradesh state:

1. Rewa
2. Panna
3. Datia
4. Orchha
5. Ajaigarh
6. Shahdol
7. Baraundha
8. Bijawar
9. Chhatarpur
10. Charkhari
11. Maihar
12. Nagod
13. Samthar
14. Alipura
15. Rampur Naikin
16. Beri
17. Sidhi
18. Bihat
19. Bijna
20. Dhurwai
21. Garrauli
22. Gaurihar
23. Singrauli
24. Jigni
25. Khaniadhana
26. Kamta Rajaula (Chaube Jagir)
27. Kothi State
28. Kirur (Kubje Jagir)
29. Lugasi
30. Naigawan Rebai
31. Pahra (Chaube Jagir)
32. (Bevhari)
33. Sarila
34. Sihawal
35. Satna Jagir)

On 25 January 1950, 11 erstwhile princely states, namely, Bihat, Banka Paharee, Baoni, Beri, Bijna, Charkhari, Jigni, Samthar, Sarila, Tori-Fatehpur and parts of Kirur Kubje were transferred to Uttar Pradesh and Madhya Bharat. Vindhya Pradesh, together with the states of Madhya Bharat and Bhopal State, was merged into Madhya Pradesh on 1 November 1956.

== Divisions ==
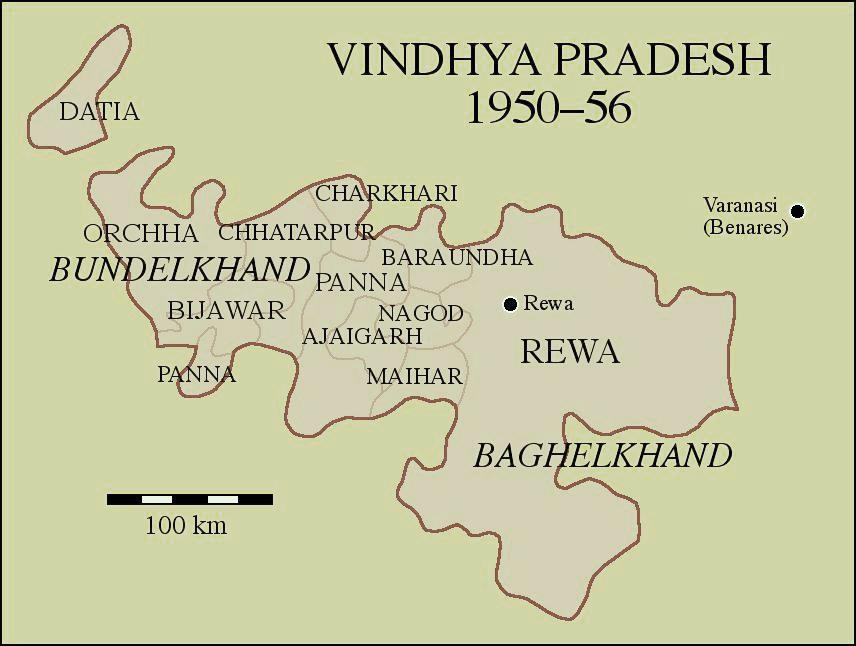
A map of Vindhya Pradesh

After formation, the state was divided into two divisions, which were further divided into 8 districts.

Bundelkhand Division with its headquarters at Nowgaon comprised the following 4 districts:

1. Panna district
2. Chhatarpur district
3. Tikamgarh district
4. Datia district

Baghelkhand Division with its headquarters at Singrauli and then Rewa comprised the following 4 districts:

1. Rewa district
2. Satna district
3. Sidhi district
4. Shahdol district

== Politics ==
=== Part B state (1948–1949) ===
In 1948, the eastern regions of Central India Agency became the Union of Baghelkhand and Bundelkhand States, and was admitted into the Dominion of India as a Part B state, headed by a Rajpramukh, deputised by a Uparajpramukh, under the advice of a Prime Minister. Martand Singh, the Maharaja of the princely state of Rewa, became the Rajpramukh and Yadvendra Singh, the ruler of the princely state of Panna, became the Uparajpramukh. Awadhesh Pratap Singh became the first Chief Minister of the Baghelkhand Division and Kamta Prasad Saxena was appointed as the Chief Minister of the Bundelkhand Division. Later Awadhesh Pratap Singh became the Chief Minister of the Vindhya Pradesh state.

==== Rajpramukhs of Union of Baghelkhand and Bundelkhand States (UBBS) ====
| # | Name | Tenure | | |
|---|---|---|---|---|
| 1 | Martand Singh | 4 April 1948 | 31 December 1949 | 1 year, 271 days |

==== Uparajpramukhs of Union of Baghelkhand and Bundelkhand States (UBBS) ====
| # | Name | Tenure | | |
|---|---|---|---|---|
| 1 | Yadvendra Singh | 4 April 1948 | 31 December 1949 | 1 year, 271 days |

==== Chief Ministers of Baghelkhand and Bundelkhand States ====
Awadhesh Pratap Singh became the first Chief Minister of the Baghelkhand Division and Kamta Prasad Saxena was appointed as the Chief Minister of the Bundelkhand Division.

| # | Name | State | | Appointed by | Party |
|---|---|---|---|---|---|
| 1 | Awadhesh Pratap Singh | Baghelkhand State | Martand Singh (Rajpramukh) | Indian National Congress | |
| 1 | Kamta Prasad Saxena | Bundelkhand State | Martand Singh (Rajpramukh) | Indian National Congress | |

==== Prime Ministers of Union of Baghelkhand and Bundelkhand States (UBBS) ====
| # | Name | Tenure | | | Appointed by | Party |
|---|---|---|---|---|---|---|
| 1 | Awadhesh Pratap Singh | 28 May 1948 | 14 April 1949 | 322 days | Martand Singh (Rajpramukh) | Indian National Congress |
| 2 | Neil Bruniat Bonerji | 15 April 1949 | 30 April 1949 | 15 days | Martand Singh (Rajpramukh) | Independent |
| 3 | Shreenath Mehta | 1 May 1949 | 31 December 1949 | 244 days | Martand Singh (Rajpramukh) | Independent |

=== Part C state (1950–1952) ===
It was renamed Vindhya Pradesh and converted to a Part C state, headed by a Chief Commissioner, on 1 January 1950.

==== Chief Commissioners of Vindhya Pradesh ====
| # | Name | Tenure | | | Appointed by |
|---|---|---|---|---|---|
| 1 | Shreenath Mehta | 1 January 1950 | 20 January 1950 | 19 days | Rajendra Prasad (President of India) |
| 2 | V. K. Balakrishna Pillai | 21 January 1950 | 30 March 1952 | 2 years, 69 days | Rajendra Prasad (President of India) |

=== Part A state (1952–1956) ===
In 1952, it became a Part A state, and the post of Chief Commissioner was replaced by the Lieutenant Governor. A legislative assembly comprising 60 members elected from 48 constituencies (36 single-member and 12 double-member) was created and the state was allotted 4 Lok Sabha constituencies (2 single-member and 2 double-member).

In the first general election in 1951, the Indian National Congress won 40 seats and the Socialist Party won 11 seats. S.N. Shukla of Indian National Congress became the Chief Minister of the state on 13 March 1952, Shivanand became the Speaker and Ram Kishore Shukla of Socialist Party the leader of the opposition of the house.

The state was dissolved on 31 October 1956 and merged with Madhya Pradesh.

==== Lieutenant Governors of Vindhya Pradesh ====
| # | Name | Tenure | | | Appointed by |
|---|---|---|---|---|---|
| 1 | Kasturirangan Santhanam | 31 March 1952 | 1 January 1956 | 3 years, 276 days | Rajendra Prasad (President of India) |
| 2 | Mosalikanti Thirumala Rao | 2 January 1956 | 31 October 1956 | 303 days | Rajendra Prasad (President of India) |

==== Chief Ministers of Vindhya Pradesh ====
| # | Name | Tenure | | | Assembly | Appointed by | Party |
|---|---|---|---|---|---|---|---|
| 1 | Sambhu Nath Shukla | 31 March 1952 | 31 October 1956 | 4 years, 214 days | 1st (1952 elections) | Kasturirangan Santhanam | Indian National Congress |

=== Post merger with Madhya Pradesh ===
Sriniwas Tiwari was a prominent politician in the region who campaigned for the re-establishment of Vindhya Pradesh over the years post its dissolution and merger with Madhya Pradesh. Other advocates of the cause include Narayan Tripathi, 4-time MLA from Maihar, and social worker Kuldeep Agnihotri, associated with the Agni Shakti Education Foundation in Rewa.

== See also ==
- List of proposed states and territories of India
