= Rampur Baghelan =

- Town
- Location in Madhya Pradesh, India Rampur Baghelan (India)
- Coordinates: 24°30′6″N 81°2′54″E
- Country: India
- State: Madhya Pradesh
- District: Rewa

Population (2001)
  - Total: 11,315

Languages
  - Official: Hindi
- Time zone: UTC+5:30 (IST)
- ISO 3166 code: IN-MP
- Vehicle registration: MP 19

Rampur Baghelan is a town and a nagar panchayat in Satna district in the Indian state of Madhya Pradesh.

== Demographics ==
As of 2001 India census, Rampur Baghelan had a population of 11,315. Males constitute 52% of the population and females 48%. Rampur Baghelan has an average literacy rate of 61%, higher than the national average of 59.5%: male literacy is 70%, and female literacy is 51%. In Rampur Baghelan, 18% of the population is under 6 years of age.
