= List of chief ministers from the Bharatiya Janata Party =

BJP chief ministers

The Bharatiya Janata Party (BJP) is one of the two major parties in the political system of the Republic of India, the other being the Indian National Congress (INC). As of 2015, it is the country's largest political party in terms of representation in the national parliament. Established in 1980, the BJP's platform is generally considered as the right wing of the political spectrum. As of 14 May 2026, 58 BJP leaders have held the position of a chief minister out of which seventeen are incumbent.

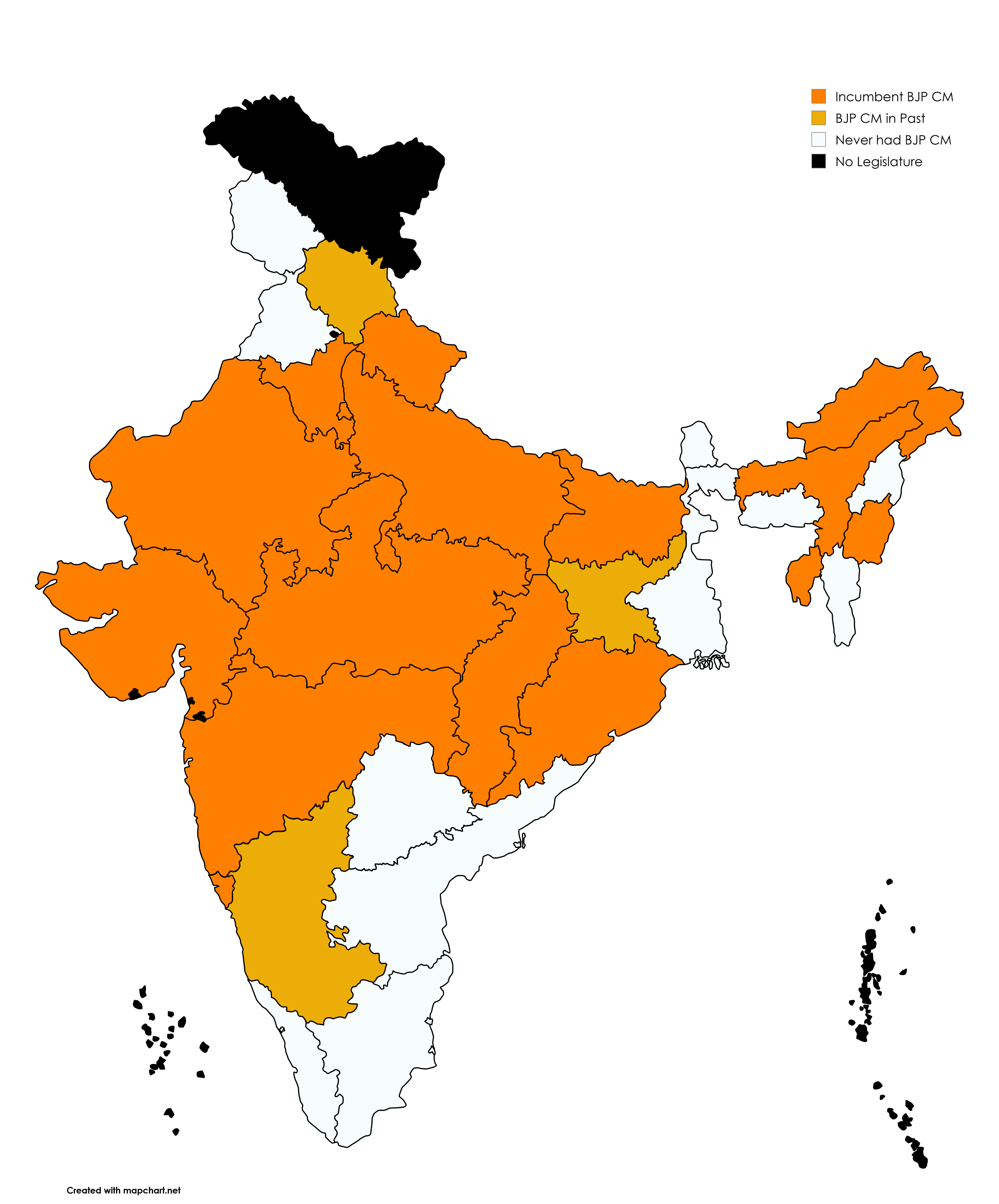
2026 BJP CM History

A chief minister is the head of government of each of the twenty-eight states and two union territories (UTs) (Delhi and Puducherry). According to the Constitution of India, at the state-level, the governor is de jure head, but de facto executive authority rests with the chief minister. Following elections to the state legislative assembly, the governor usually invites the party (or coalition) with a majority of seats to form the government. The governor appoints the chief minister, whose council of ministers are collectively responsible to the assembly. The chief minister's term is usually for a maximum of five years, with the confidence of the assembly's confidence. There are no limits to the number of terms the chief minister can serve.

Of the 58 BJP chief ministers, seventeen are incumbent – Pema Khandu in Arunachal Pradesh, Himanta Biswa Sarma in Assam, Samrat Choudhary in Bihar, Vishnu Deo Sai in Chhattisgarh, Rekha Gupta in Delhi, Pramod Sawant in Goa, Bhupendrabhai Patel in Gujarat, Nayab Singh Saini in Haryana, Mohan Yadav in Madhya Pradesh, Devendra Fadnavis in Maharashtra, Yumnam Khemchand Singh in Manipur, Mohan Charan Majhi in Odisha, Bhajan Lal Sharma in Rajasthan, Manik Saha in Tripura, Pushkar Singh Dhami in Uttarakhand, Yogi Adityanath in Uttar Pradesh and Suvendu Adhikari in West Bengal .Five of the BJP chief ministers have been women – Sushma Swaraj and Rekha Gupta in Delhi,Uma Bharti in Madhya Pradesh, Anandiben Patel in Gujarat and Vasundhara Raje in Rajasthan. Shivraj Singh Chauhan, as chief minister of Madhya Pradesh for longer than 15 years is the longest-serving chief minister from the BJP. Devendra Fadnavis's second tenure as the chief minister of Maharashtra lasted for only three days, which is the least tenure among chief ministers from BJP; however, taking the total of all the tenures into consideration, Sushma Swaraj served as a chief minister of Delhi for the shortest period of 52 days. Bhairon Singh Shekhawat of Rajasthan was the first chief minister from the BJP; however some BJP leaders had already been elected before as the chief minister while being a member of the Janata Party (JP), an amalgam of political parties which included BJP's predecessor Bharatiya Jana Sangh.

There have been seven chief ministers in Uttarakhand from the BJP, six chief ministers in Gujarat, five chief ministers in Madhya Pradesh, four chief ministers in Karnataka and Uttar Pradesh and Delhi each, and three in Goa, Himachal Pradesh and Jharkhand each; two in Haryana , Manipur, Chhattisgarh, Tripura, Assam and Arunachal Pradesh each; and one in Bihar, Odisha, Maharashtra and West Bengal each. It has never had chief ministers in Andhra Pradesh, Jammu and Kashmir, Kerala, Meghalaya, Mizoram, Nagaland, Punjab, Puducherry, Sikkim, Tamil Nadu, and Telangana.

== Arunachal Pradesh ==
#	Portrait	Name	Constituency	Term in office			Assembly
1		Gegong Apang (Note: Apang was a member of the INC while becoming the chief minister for the first time. However, he left the INC and formed the Arunachal Congress in 1996, and remained the chief minister until 1999. He was reelected as the chief minister in August 2003, and his party merged with the BJP in the same month. However, he again joined the INC in August 2004, and remained seated on the post of chief minister until 2007. He once again joined the BJP in February 2014, but left it in January 2019 and joined the Janata Dal (Secular) in February 2019.)	Tuting–Yingkiong	31 August 2003	29 August 2004	364 days	6th
2		Pema Khandu (Note: Khandu became the chief minister in July 2016 while being a member of the INC. He joined the People's Party of Arunachal in September 2016, and later defected to the BJP in December 2016.)	Mukto	31 December 2016	28 May 2019	9 years, 325 days	9th
2		Pema Khandu	Mukto	29 May 2019	12 June 2024	9 years, 325 days	10th
2		Pema Khandu	Mukto	13 June 2024	Incumbent	9 years, 325 days	11th

Key

- * – Incumbent chief minister

== Assam ==
#	Portrait	Name	Constituency	Term in office			Assembly
1		Sarbananda Sonowal	Majuli	24 May 2016	10 May 2021	4 years, 351 days	14th
2		Himanta Biswa Sarma	Jalukbari	10 May 2021	12 May 2026	5 years, 195 days	15th
2		Himanta Biswa Sarma	Jalukbari	12 May 2026	Incumbent	5 years, 195 days	16th

Key

- * – Incumbent chief minister

== Bihar ==
#	Portrait	Name	Constituency	Term in office			Assembly
1		Samrat Choudhary	Tarapur	15 April 2026	Incumbent	220 days	18th

Key

- * – Incumbent chief minister

== Chhattisgarh ==
#	Portrait	Name	Constituency	Term in office			Assembly
1		Raman Singh	Dongargaon	7 December 2003	11 December 2008	15 years, 10 days	2nd
1		Raman Singh	Rajnandgaon	12 December 2008	11 December 2013	15 years, 10 days	3rd
1		Raman Singh	Rajnandgaon	12 December 2013	17 December 2018	15 years, 10 days	4th
2		Vishnu Deo Sai	Kunkuri	13 December 2023	Incumbent	2 years, 343 days	6th

Key

- * – Incumbent chief minister

== Delhi ==
#	Portrait	Name	Constituency	Term in office			Assembly
1		Madan Lal Khurana	Moti Nagar	2 December 1993	26 February 1996	2 years, 86 days	1st
2		Sahib Singh Verma	Shalimar Bagh	26 February 1996	12 October 1998	2 years, 228 days	1st
3		Sushma Swaraj	Did not contest	12 October 1998	3 December 1998	52 days	1st
4		Rekha Gupta	Shalimar Bagh	20 February 2025	Incumbent	1 year, 274 days	8th

Key

- * – Incumbent chief minister

== Goa ==
#	Portrait	Name	Constituency	Term in office			Assembly
1		Manohar Parrikar	Panaji	24 October 2000	2 June 2002	8 years, 349 days	8th
1		Manohar Parrikar	Panaji	3 June 2002	3 February 2005	8 years, 349 days	9th
1		Manohar Parrikar	Panaji	9 March 2012	8 November 2014	8 years, 349 days	11th
1		Manohar Parrikar	Panaji	14 March 2017	17 March 2019	8 years, 349 days	12th
2		Laxmikant Parsekar	Mandrem	8 November 2014	14 March 2017	2 years, 126 days	11th
3		Pramod Sawant	Sanquelim	19 March 2019	27 March 2022	7 years, 247 days	12th
3		Pramod Sawant	Sanquelim	28 March 2022	Incumbent	7 years, 247 days	13th

Key

- * – Incumbent chief minister

== Gujarat ==
#	Portrait	Name	Constituency	Term in office			Assembly
1		Keshubhai Patel	Visavadar	14 March 1995	21 October 1995	4 years, 73 days	9th
1		Keshubhai Patel	Visavadar	4 March 1998	7 October 2001	4 years, 73 days	10th
2		Suresh Mehta	Mandvi	21 October 1995	19 September 1996	334 days	9th
3		Narendra Modi	Rajkot West	7 October 2001	21 December 2002	12 years, 227 days	10th
3		Narendra Modi	Maninagar	22 December 2002	22 December 2007	12 years, 227 days	11th
3		Narendra Modi	Maninagar	23 December 2007	25 December 2012	12 years, 227 days	12th
3		Narendra Modi	Maninagar	26 December 2012	22 May 2014	12 years, 227 days	13th
4		Anandiben Patel	Ghatlodia	22 May 2014	7 August 2016	2 years, 77 days	13th
5		Vijay Rupani	Rajkot West	7 August 2016	25 December 2017	5 years, 37 days	13th
5		Vijay Rupani	Rajkot West	26 December 2017	13 September 2021	5 years, 37 days	14th
6		Bhupendrabhai Patel	Ghatlodia	13 September 2021	11 December 2022	5 years, 69 days	14th
6		Bhupendrabhai Patel	Ghatlodia	12 December 2022	Incumbent	5 years, 69 days	15th

Key

- * – Incumbent chief minister

== Haryana ==
#	Portrait	Name	Constituency	Term in office			Assembly
1		Manohar Lal Khattar	Karnal	26 October 2014	26 October 2019	9 years, 138 days	13th
1		Manohar Lal Khattar	Karnal	27 October 2019	12 March 2024	9 years, 138 days	14th
2		Nayab Singh Saini	Karnal	12 March 2024	17 October 2024	2 years, 254 days	14th
2		Nayab Singh Saini	Ladwa	17 October 2024	Incumbent	2 years, 254 days	15th

Key

- * – Incumbent chief minister

== Himachal Pradesh ==
#	Portrait	Name	Constituency	Term in office			Assembly
1		Shanta Kumar (Note: Shanta Kumar became the chief minister for the first time (1977–1980) while being a member of the JP.)	Palampur	5 March 1990	15 December 1992	2 years, 285 days	7th
2		Prem Kumar Dhumal	Bamsan	24 March 1998	6 March 2003	9 years, 343 days	9th
2		Prem Kumar Dhumal	Bamsan	30 December 2007	25 December 2012	9 years, 343 days	11th
3		Jai Ram Thakur	Seraj	27 December 2017	11 December 2022	4 years, 349 days	13th

Key

- * – Incumbent chief minister

== Jharkhand ==
#	Portrait	Name	Constituency	Term in office			Assembly
1		Babulal Marandi	Ramgarh	15 November 2000	18 March 2003	2 years, 123 days	1st
2		Arjun Munda	Kharsawan	18 March 2003	2 March 2005	5 years, 304 days	1st
2		Arjun Munda	Kharsawan	12 March 2005	19 September 2006	5 years, 304 days	2nd
2		Arjun Munda	Kharsawan	11 September 2010	18 January 2013	5 years, 304 days	3rd
3		Raghubar Das	Jamshedpur East	28 December 2014	29 December 2019	5 years, 1 day	4th

Key

- * – Incumbent chief minister

== Karnataka ==
#	Portrait	Name	Constituency	Term in office			Assembly
1		B. S. Yediyurappa	Shikaripura	12 November 2007	19 November 2007	5 years, 81 days	12th
1		B. S. Yediyurappa	Shikaripura	30 May 2008	5 August 2011	5 years, 81 days	13th
1		B. S. Yediyurappa	Shikaripura	17 May 2018	23 May 2018	5 years, 81 days	15th
1		B. S. Yediyurappa	Shikaripura	26 July 2019	28 July 2021	5 years, 81 days	15th
2		Sadananda Gowda	MLC	5 August 2011	12 July 2012	342 days	13th
3		Jagadish Shettar	Hubli-Dharwad Central	12 July 2012	13 May 2013	305 days	13th
4		Basavaraj Bommai	Shiggaon	28 July 2021	20 May 2023	1 year, 296 days	15th

Key

- * – Incumbent chief minister

== Madhya Pradesh ==
(Note: Kailash Chandra Joshi is a BJP leader who became Madhya Pradesh chief minister in 1977 as a member of JP. Virendra Kumar Sakhlecha, who became Madhya Pradesh chief minister in 1978 as a JP member, was also a BJP leader.)

#	Portrait	Name	Constituency	Term in office			Assembly
1		Sunder Lal Patwa (Note: Patwa became the chief minister for the first time (January 1980 – February 1980) while being a member of the JP.)	Bhojpur	5 March 1990	15 December 1992	2 years, 285 days	9th
2		Uma Bharti	Malhara	8 December 2003	23 August 2004	259 days	12th
3		Babulal Gaur	Govindpura	23 August 2004	28 November 2005	1 year, 98 days	12th
4		Shivraj Singh Chouhan	Budhni	29 November 2005	11 December 2008	16 years, 282 days	12th
4		Shivraj Singh Chouhan	Budhni	12 December 2008	13 December 2013	16 years, 282 days	13th
4		Shivraj Singh Chouhan	Budhni	14 December 2013	17 December 2018	16 years, 282 days	14th
4		Shivraj Singh Chouhan	Budhni	23 March 2020	13 December 2023	16 years, 282 days	15th
5		Mohan Yadav	Ujjain South	13 December 2023	Incumbent	2 years, 343 days	16th

Key

- * – Incumbent chief minister

== Maharashtra ==
#	Portrait	Name	Constituency	Term in office			Assembly
1		Devendra Fadnavis	Nagpur South West	31 October 2014	12 November 2019	7 years, 3 days	13th
1		Devendra Fadnavis	Nagpur South West	23 November 2019	28 November 2019	7 years, 3 days	14th
1		Devendra Fadnavis	Nagpur South West	5 December 2024	Incumbent	7 years, 3 days	15th

Key

- * – Incumbent chief minister

== Manipur ==
#	Portrait	Name	Constituency	Term in office			Assembly
1		N. Biren Singh	Heignang	15 March 2017	20 March 2022	7 years, 335 days	12th
1		N. Biren Singh	Heignang	21 March 2022	13 February 2025	7 years, 335 days	13th
2		Yumnam Khemchand Singh	Singjamei	4 February 2026	Incumbent	290 days	13th

Key

- * – Incumbent chief minister

== Odisha ==
#	Portrait	Name	Constituency	Term in office			Assembly
1		Mohan Charan Majhi	Keonjhar	12 June 2024	Incumbent	2 years, 162 days	17th

Key

- * – Incumbent chief minister

== Rajasthan ==
#	Portrait	Name	Constituency	Term in office			Assembly
1		Bhairon Singh Shekhawat (Note: Shekhawat became the chief minister for the first time (1977–1980) while being a member of the JP.)	Chhabra	4 March 1990	15 December 1992	7 years, 283 days	9th
1		Bhairon Singh Shekhawat	Bali	4 December 1993	1 December 1998	7 years, 283 days	10th
2		Vasundhara Raje	Jhalrapatan	8 December 2003	12 December 2008	10 years, 8 days	12th
2		Vasundhara Raje	Jhalrapatan	13 December 2013	17 December 2018	10 years, 8 days	14th
3		Bhajan Lal Sharma	Sanganer	15 December 2023	Incumbent	2 years, 341 days	16th

Key

- * – Incumbent chief minister

== Tripura ==
#	Portrait	Name	Constituency	Term in office			Assembly
1		Biplab Kumar Deb	Banamalipur	9 March 2018	15 May 2022	4 years, 67 days	12th
2		Manik Saha	Town Bordowali	15 May 2022	7 March 2023	4 years, 190 days	12th
2		Manik Saha	Town Bordowali	8 March 2023	Incumbent	4 years, 190 days	13th

Key

- * – Incumbent chief minister

== Uttar Pradesh ==
#	Portrait	Name	Constituency	Term in office			Assembly
1		Kalyan Singh	Atrauli	24 June 1991	6 December 1992	3 years, 217 days	11th
1		Kalyan Singh	Atrauli	21 September 1997	12 November 1999	3 years, 217 days	13th
2		Ram Prakash Gupta	MLC	12 November 1999	28 October 2000	351 days	13th
3		Rajnath Singh	Haidergarh	28 October 2000	8 March 2002	1 year, 131 days	13th
4		Yogi Adityanath	MLC	19 March 2017	24 March 2022	9 years, 247 days	17th
4		Yogi Adityanath	Gorakhpur Urban	25 March 2022	Incumbent	9 years, 247 days	18th

Key

- * – Incumbent chief minister

== Uttarakhand ==
#	Portrait	Name	Constituency	Term in office			Assembly
1		Nityanand Swami	MLC	9 November 2000	30 October 2001	355 days	Interim
2		Bhagat Singh Koshyari	MLC	30 October 2001	1 March 2002	123 days	Interim
3		B. C. Khanduri	Dhumakot	7 March 2007	27 June 2009	2 years, 296 days	2nd
3		B. C. Khanduri	Dhumakot	11 September 2011	13 March 2012	2 years, 296 days	2nd
4		Ramesh Pokhriyal	Thalisain	27 June 2009	11 September 2011	2 years, 76 days	2nd
5		Trivendra Singh Rawat	Doiwala	18 March 2017	10 March 2021	3 years, 357 days	4th
6		Tirath Singh Rawat	Did not Contest	10 March 2021	4 July 2021	116 days	4th
7		Pushkar Singh Dhami	Khatima	4 July 2021	22 March 2022	5 years, 140 days	4th
7		Pushkar Singh Dhami	Champawat	23 March 2022	Incumbent	5 years, 140 days	5th

Key

- * – Incumbent chief minister

== West Bengal ==
#	Portrait	Name	Constituency	Term in office			Assembly
1		Suvendu Adhikari	Bhabanipur	9 May 2026	Incumbent	196 days	18th

Key

- * – Incumbent chief minister

== See also ==
- List of current Indian chief ministers
- List of current Indian deputy chief ministers
- List of longest-serving Indian chief ministers
- List of female chief ministers in India
- List of chief ministers from the Communist Party of India (Marxist)
- List of chief ministers from the Indian National Congress
