= List of chief ministers from the Communist Party of India (Marxist) =

The Communist Party of India (Marxist) (abbreviated as CPI(M) or CPM) is a communist political party in India that formed as the result of a split in the Communist Party of India (CPI) in 1964. It has the status of a "national party" in India and has headed state governments in three of the states in the country.

A chief minister is the head of government of each of the twenty-eight states and three union territories (Delhi, Jammu and Kashmir and Puducherry). In accordance with the Constitution of India, the governor is a state's de jure head, but de facto executive authority rests with the chief minister. Following elections to the state legislative assembly, the state's governor usually invites the party (or coalition) with a majority of seats to form the government. The governor appoints the chief minister, whose council of ministers are collectively responsible to the assembly. Given the confidence of the assembly, the chief minister's term is for five years and is subject to no term limits.

As of May 2026, nine people from the CPI(M) have held the position of a chief minister — four in Kerala, three in Tripura, and two in West Bengal.

== Kerala ==
- * – Incumbent chief minister

Name	Portrait	Term(s)	Tenure(s) (Note: Sources: Kerala: Official website of Kerala Legislature; West Bengal: Official website of West Bengal Legislative Assembly; Tripura: Legislative Bodies in India (an Indian government website) page on Tripura Legislative Assembly and a news article for the date of end of Manik Sarkar's term.)
E. M. S. Namboodiripad	A portrait of E.M.S. Namboodiripad	2 (Note: Namboodiripad has served two terms as a chief minister; the first in 1957 as a CPI leader and second in 1967 as a CPI(M) leader.)	6 March 1967 – 1 November 1969 (2 years, 240 days)
E. K. Nayanar	A photograph of E.K. Nayanar	3	25 January 1980 – 20 October 1981 (1 year, 268 days); 26 March 1987 – 17 June 1991 (4 years, 83 days); 20 May 1996 – 13 May 2001 (4 years, 358 days)
V. S. Achuthanandan	A photograph of V.S. Achutanandan	1	18 May 2006 – 14 May 2011 (4 years, 361 days)
Pinarayi Vijayan		2	25 May 2016 – 18 May 2026 (9 years, 358 days)

== Tripura ==
Name	Portrait	Term(s)	Tenure(s)
Nripen Chakraborty		2	5 January 1978 – 5 February 1988 (10 years, 31 days)
Dasarath Deb		1	10 April 1993 – 11 March 1998 (4 years, 335 days)
Manik Sarkar	A photograph of Manik Sarkar	4	11 March 1998 – 9 March 2018 (19 years, 363 days)

== West Bengal ==
Name	Portrait	Term(s)	Tenure(s)
Jyoti Basu	A portrait of Jyoti Basu	5	21 June 1977 – 5 November 2000 (23 years, 138 days)
Buddhadeb Bhattacharjee	A portrait of Buddhadeb Bhattacharya	2	6 November 2000 – 20 May 2011 (10 years, 188 days)

== See also ==
- List of current Indian chief ministers
- List of current Indian deputy chief ministers
- List of longest-serving Indian chief ministers
- List of female chief ministers in India
- List of chief ministers from the Bharatiya Janata Party
- List of chief ministers from the Indian National Congress
