= List of Indian chief ministers who died in office =

This is a list of heads of government of Indian States who died in office. Such deaths have most often been from natural causes, but there are also cases of assassination and accidents.

The list is in chronological order. The name is listed first, followed by the year of death, the state, political party, the location of the death and the cause of death.

== List ==
S. No.	Portrait	Name	Date of death (age)	State	Political party	Place of death	Cause of death	Ref.
1		Gopinath Bordoloi	5 August 1950 (60)	Assam	Indian National Congress	Guwahati	Cardiac arrest	
2		Raghbir Singh	12 January 1955 (60)	Patiala and East Punjab State Union	Indian National Congress	Patiala	N/A	
3		Ravishankar Shukla	31 December 1956 (79)	Madhya Pradesh	Indian National Congress	New Delhi	Cardiac arrest	
4		Shri Krishna Sinha	31 January 1961 (74)	Bihar	Indian National Congress	Patna	Cardiac arrest	
5		Bidhan Chandra Roy	1 July 1962 (80)	West Bengal	Indian National Congress	Kolkata	Stroke	
6		Marotrao Kannamwar	24 November 1963 (63)	Maharashtra	Indian National Congress	Bombay	N/A	
7		Balwantrai Mehta	19 September 1965 (65)	Gujarat	Indian National Congress	Suthari	Plane shot down	
8		C. N. Annadurai	3 November 1969 (59)	Tamil Nadu / Madras	Dravida Munnetra Kazhagam	Madras	Cancer	
9		Dayanand Bandodkar	12 August 1973 (62)	Goa, Daman and Diu	Maharashtrawadi Gomantak Party	Bambolim	Cardiac arrest	
10		Barkatullah Khan	11 October 1973 (52)	Rajasthan	Indian National Congress	Jaipur	Cardiac arrest	
11		Sheikh Abdullah	8 September 1982 (76)	Jammu and Kashmir	Jammu & Kashmir National Conference	Srinagar	Physical illness	
12		M. G. Ramachandran	24 December 1987 (70)	Tamil Nadu	All India Anna Dravida Munnetra Kazhagam	Madras	Kidney failure	
13		Chimanbhai Patel	17 February 1994 (64)	Gujarat	Indian National Congress	Ahmedabad	Cardiac arrest	
14		Beant Singh	31 August 1995 (73)	Punjab	Indian National Congress	Chandigarh	Bomb blast	
15		Hiteswar Saikia	22 April 1996 (61)	Assam	Indian National Congress	New Delhi	Cardiac arrest	
16		Y. S. Rajasekhara Reddy	2 September 2009 (60)	Andhra Pradesh	Indian National Congress	Kurnool	Helicopter crash	
17		Dorjee Khandu	30 April 2011 (56)	Arunachal Pradesh	Indian National Congress	Tawang	Helicopter crash	
18		Mufti Mohammad Sayeed	7 January 2016 (79)	Jammu and Kashmir	Jammu and Kashmir People's Democratic Party	New Delhi	Multiple-organ failure	
19		J. Jayalalithaa	5 December 2016 (68)	Tamil Nadu	All India Anna Dravida Munnetra Kazhagam	Chennai	Cardiac arrest	
20		Manohar Parrikar	17 March 2019 (63)	Goa	Bharatiya Janata Party	Panaji	Pancreatic cancer	

== See also ==
- List of current Indian chief ministers
- List of longest-serving Indian chief ministers
