= Surendra Patwa =

Indian politician

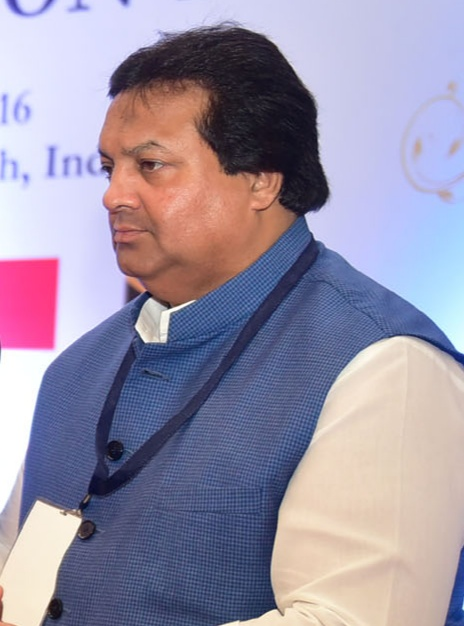

Member of the Madhya Pradesh Legislative Assembly
- Incumbent
- Assumed office 2008
- Preceded by: Rajesh Patel
- Constituency: Bhojpur

Minister of Tourism and Culture, Madhya Pradesh Government
- In office December 2013 – December 2018
- Succeeded by: Dr. Vijay Laxmi Sadho

Personal details
- Born: 19 January 1964 (age 62) Nimach, Madhya Pradesh, India
- Party: Bharatiya Janata Party
- Relatives: Sundar Lal Patwa (Uncle)
- Profession: Politician

Surendra Patwa (born 19 January 1964) is an Indian politician and member of the Bharatiya Janata Party. He is a member of Madhya Pradesh Legislative Assembly from Bhojpur constituency in Raisen district since 2008.

== Political career ==
Surendra Patwa is a former Minister of State with Independent Charges for Ministry of Culture and Tourism in Government of Madhya Pradesh. He is nephew of Sunder Lal Patwa, a former Chief Minister of Madhya Pradesh.
