= Babagouda Patil =

Indian minister (1945–2021)

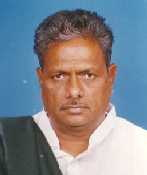
- Patil in 1998

Minister of State (Independent Charge) of Rural Development Government of India
- In office 19 March 1998 – 13 October 1999
- Prime Minister: Atal Bihari Vajpayee
- Preceded by: Kinjarapu Yerran Naidu
- Succeeded by: Sundar Lal Patwa

Member of Parliament Lok Sabha
- In office 1998–1999
- Preceded by: Shivanand Koujalagi
- Succeeded by: Amarsinh Vasantrao Patil
- Constituency: Belagavi

Personal details
- Born: 6 January 1945 Chikka Bagewadi, Belgavi, Karnataka
- Died: 21 May 2021 (aged 76) Belgavi, Karnataka
- Party: Bharatiya Janata Party

Babagouda Patil (6 January 1945 – 21 May 2021) was an Indian politician. He was Union Minister of State (Independent Charge) of Rural Development in the Government of India during Second Vajpayee Ministry.

== Political career ==
Patil was elected to the Lok Sabha from Belagavi in Karnataka on the Bharatiya Janata Party ticket. Before joining BJP he was founder and chairperson of “Karnataka Rajya Raityasangha” through which he worked for the welfare of Indian farmers. He was active in the farmers' movement in Karnataka. He was the Minister of Rural development in Government of India during 1998 to 1999.

== Death ==
Patil died in 2021 from COVID-19.
