= Sunder Lal Patwa =

11th Chief Minister of Madhya Pradesh

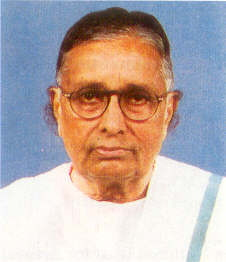

Minister of Mines
- In office 7 November 2000 – 1 September 2001
- Prime Minister: Atal Bihari Vajpayee
- Preceded by: Naveen Patnaik
- Succeeded by: Ram Vilas Paswan

Minister of Chemicals and Fertilizers
- In office 30 September 2000 – 7 November 2000
- Prime Minister: Atal Bihari Vajpayee
- Preceded by: Suresh Prabhu
- Succeeded by: Satyabrata Mookherjee

Minister of Agriculture
- In office 6 March 2000 – 26 May 2000
- Prime Minister: Atal Bihari Vajpayee
- Preceded by: Nitish Kumar
- Succeeded by: Nitish Kumar

Minister of Rural Development
- In office 13 October 1999 – 30 September 2000
- Prime Minister: Atal Bihari Vajpayee
- Preceded by: Babagouda Patil
- Succeeded by: Venkaiah Naidu

Member of Parliament, Lok Sabha
- In office 6 October 1999 – 16 May 2004
- Preceded by: Sartaj Singh
- Succeeded by: Sartaj Singh
- Constituency: Narmadapuram
- In office 1997–1998
- Preceded by: Alka Nath
- Succeeded by: Kamal Nath
- Constituency: Chhindwara

11th Chief Minister of Madhya Pradesh
- In office 5 March 1990 – 15 December 1992
- Preceded by: Shyama Charan Shukla
- Succeeded by: President's rule
- In office 20 January 1980 – 17 February 1980
- Preceded by: Virendra Kumar Sakhlecha
- Succeeded by: Arjun Singh

Leader of the Opposition Madhya Pradesh Legislative Assembly
- In office 4 July 1980 – 10 March 1985
- Chief Minister: Arjun Singh
- Preceded by: Arjun Singh
- Succeeded by: Kailash Chandra Joshi

Member of Madhya Pradesh Legislative Assembly
- In office 1985–1997
- Preceded by: Shaligram
- Succeeded by: Naresh Singh Patel
- Constituency: Bhojpur
- In office 1980–1985
- Preceded by: Sabita Bajpai
- Succeeded by: Shankar Lal
- Constituency: Sehore
- In office 1977–1980
- Preceded by: Shyam Sunder Patidar
- Succeeded by: Shyam Sunder Patidar
- Constituency: Mandsaur
- In office 1957–1967
- Preceded by: Nadram Das
- Succeeded by: constituency established
- Constituency: Manasa

Personal details
- Born: 11 November 1924 Kukreshwar, Gwalior State, British India
- Died: 28 December 2016 (aged 92) Bhopal, Madhya Pradesh, India
- Party: Bharatiya Janata Party

Sunder Lal Patwa (11 November 1924 – 28 December 2016) was an Indian politician, who served as the Chief Minister of Madhya Pradesh and a cabinet minister in the Government of India. He was Chief Minister of Madhya Pradesh twice, from 20 January 1980 to 17 February 1980 and from 5 March 1990 to 15 December 1992.

He was a member of the Bharatiya Janata Party. He was the only politician who defeated Congress strong man Kamal Nath in 1997 from Chhindwara constituency for member of parliament. He was awarded Padma Vibhushan, the second-highest civilian award, posthumously in 2017 by the Government of India.

== Early life ==
Sunder Lal Patwa was born in a Svetambara Jain family in the village of Kukreshwar located between Manasa and Rampura in the Neemuch District of Madhya Pradesh.

== Political career ==
Sunder Lal Patwa was an active RSS worker from 1942 to 1951. He spent six months in jail in 1948 when RSS was banned in the wake of Mahatma Gandhi’s assassination. In 1951, he was among the founding members of the Jana Sangh, where he was general secretary of the state unit.

He began his political career with Jana Sangh which merged with Janata Party in 1977. Later members owing allegiance to Jana Sangh's Hindutva ideology broke away from Janata Party in 1980 to form Bharatiya Janata Party.

He was Chief Minister of Madhya Pradesh twice, from 20 January 1980 to 17 February 1980 as member of Janata Party and from 5 March 1990 to 15 December 1992 as leader of Bharatiya Janta Party.

He was first elected to Lok Sabha via by-poll in Chhindwara in 1997 by defeating Congress strongman Kamal Nath in his home turf. He lost from Chhindwara in 1998 General Election.

In 1999, he was elected to the Lok Sabha from Narmadapuram constituency, and was minister in Atal Bihari Vajpayee Government from 1999 to 2001. As a legislator, he was known as strict disciplinarian.

He was associated with Indore Rajya Praja Mandal since 1941, R.S.S. since 1942 and R.S.S. Vistarak, 1947–51. He was imprisoned for seven months for participating in R.S.S. movement in 1948 and was an active worker of Jana Sangh since 1951, Chairman of District Cooperative Bank, Director, State Cooperative Bank and State Cooperative Marketing Sangh and Treasurer, Jana Sangh from 1967 to 1974. He was detained under M.I.S.A. during Emergency from June 1975 to January 1977. He was awarded the "Vidhan Gaurav" in the All India Conference of Presiding Officers, 1989.

He died on 28 December 2016 in Bhopal due to a heart attack at the age of 92.

== Positions held ==
Patwa contested from a variety of seats and he held a variety of official posts:

- 1957-67 - MLA from Manasa
- Lost Vidhan Sabha elections from Manasa in 1967 and 1972.
- 1977-1980 - MLA from Mandsaur
- 1980-1985 - MLA from Sehore
- 1985–90 - MLA from Bhojpur. But lost from Manasa.
- 1990–92, 1993-97 - MLA from Bhojpur
- 1997-1998 : Lok Sabha Member from Chhindwara (Lok Sabha constituency) by defeating Kamal Nath
- 1998-99 - MLA from Bhojpur
- 1999-2004 : Lok Sabha Member from Narmadapuram (Lok Sabha constituency)
- 1957-67 - Chief Whip, Opposition Party, Madhya Pradesh Legislative Assembly
- 1975 - General Secretary, Jana Sangh, Madhya Pradesh
- 1977 - Member, Working Committee, Janata Party
- 20 Jan 1980 - 17 February 1980 - Chief Minister of Madhya Pradesh
- 1980-85 - Leader of Opposition, Madhya Pradesh Legislative Assembly; chairman, Public Accounts Committee, Madhya Pradesh Legislative Assembly
- 1986 - President, B.J.P., Madhya Pradesh; Member, General Purposes Committee, Madhya Pradesh Legislative Assembly
- 5 March 1990 - 15 December 1992 - Chief Minister of Madhya Pradesh
- 13 Oct 1999 – 30 September 2000 - Minister of Rural Development, in Vajpayee Govt.
- 30 Sep 2000 – 7 November 2000 - Minister of Chemicals and Fertilizers, in Vajpayee Govt.
- 7 Nov 2000 – 1 September 2001 - Minister of Mines, in Vajpayee Govt.

== Personal life ==
Two of his nephews entered politics on his heels. Surendra Patwa was first elected to Madhya Pradesh Vidhan Sabha from Bhojpur in 2008. He has been a minister in Madhya Pradesh state government.

His nephew Mangal Patwa (1965–2015) contested elections from Manasa seat in 1998 but lost. He became President of BJP's Neemuch District unit. Mangal Patwa died in a road accident in 2015.

Lok Sabha
Preceded by Alka Nath	Member of Parliament for Chhindwara; 1997 – 1998	Succeeded by Kamal Nath
Preceded by Sartaj Singh	Member of Parliament for Hoshangabad; 1999 – 2004	Succeeded by Sartaj Singh
Political offices
Preceded by Virendra Kumar Sakhlecha	Chief Minister of Madhya Pradesh; 20 January 1980 – 17 February 1980	Succeeded by President's rule
Preceded by Shyama Charan Shukla	Chief Minister of Madhya Pradesh; 5 March 1990 – 15 December 1992	Succeeded by President's rule
Preceded by Babagouda Patil; Minister of State	Minister of Rural Development; 13 October 1999 – 30 September 2000	Succeeded by Venkaiah Naidu
Preceded by Suresh Prabhu	Minister of Chemicals and Fertilizers; 30 September 2000 – 7 November 2000	Succeeded by Satyabrata Mookherjee; Minister of State
Preceded by Naveen Patnaik	Minister of Mines; 7 November 2000 – 1 September 2001	Succeeded by Ram Vilas Paswan
