= Mandsaur Assembly constituency =

Constituency of the Madhya Pradesh legislative assembly in India

Coordinates: 24.08°N 75.06°E

Mandsaur
- Constituency No. 224 for the Madhya Pradesh Legislative Assembly

Constituency details
- Country: India
- Region: Central India
- State: Madhya Pradesh
- District: Mandsaur
- Lok Sabha constituency: Mandsaur
- Reservation: None

Member of Legislative Assembly
- 16th Madhya Pradesh Legislative Assembly
- Incumbent Vipin Jain
- Party: Indian National Congress
- Elected year: 2023
- Preceded by: Yashpal Singh Sisodiya

Mandsaur is one of the Vidhan Sabha (Legislative Assembly) constituencies of Madhya Pradesh state in central India, in Mandsaur district. It is one of the 8 assembly segments of Mandsaur (Lok Sabha constituency). Former CM Sunder Lal Patwa had represented Mandsour Vidhan Sabha seat in the past. Jawad seat, a borough of another former CM Sakhlecha, is also part of this region.

== Members of the Legislative Assembly ==
Election	Name	Party
1957	Shyam Sunder Patidar	Indian National Congress
1962	Shyam Sunder Patidar	Indian National Congress
1967	T. Mohan Singh	Bharatiya Jan Sangh
1972	Shyam Sunder Patidar	Indian National Congress
1977	Sunder Lal Patwa	Janata Party
1980	Shyam Sunder Patidar	Indian National Congress (Indira)
1985	Shyam Sunder Patidar	Indian National Congress
1990	Kailash Chawla	Bharatiya Janata Party
1993	Kailash Chawla	Bharatiya Janata Party
1998	Navkrishna Patil	Indian National Congress
2003	Om Prakash Purohit	Bharatiya Janata Party
2008	Yashpal Singh Sisodiya	Bharatiya Janata Party
2013	Yashpal Singh Sisodiya	Bharatiya Janata Party
2018	Yashpal Singh Sisodiya	Bharatiya Janata Party
2023	Vipin Jain	Indian National Congress

== Election results ==
=== 2023 ===
2023 Madhya Pradesh Legislative Assembly election: Mandsaur
Party	Candidate	Votes	%	±%
INC	Vipin Jain	105,316	49.43	+6.31
BJP	Yashpalsingh Sisodiya	103,267	48.47	−4.05
NOTA	None of the above	1,530	0.72	−0.21
Majority		2,049	0.96	−8.44
Turnout		213,046	81.82	+2.19
INC gain from BJP		Swing		

=== 2018 ===
2018 Madhya Pradesh Legislative Assembly election: Mandsaur
Party	Candidate	Votes	%	±%
BJP	Yashpal Singh Sisodiya	102,626	52.52	
INC	Narendra Nahata	84,256	43.12	
Sapaks Party	Sunil Bansal	2,543	1.3	
NOTA	None of the above	1,815	0.93	
Majority		18,370	9.4	
Turnout		195,415	79.63	
BJP gain from		Swing		

=== 2008 ===
- Yashpal Singh Sisodiya (BJP) : 60,013 votes
- Mahendra Singh Gurjar (INC) : 58,328

=== 1985 ===
- Shyam Sundar Patidar (INC) : 29,717 votes
- Manoharlal Basantilal Jain (BJP) : 23,926

=== 1977 ===
- Sunderlal Patwa (JNP) : 29,271 votes
- Dhansukhlal Nandlal Bhachawat (INC) : 20,088

=== 1972 ===
- Shyam Sunder Patidar (INC) : 27,779 votes
- Kishore Singh (Jana Sangh) : 19,262

=== 1967 ===
- T. Mohan Singh (BJS) : 17,171 votes
- S. Patidar (INC) : 11,083
