= List of longest-serving Indian chief ministers =

Longest-serving chief ministers of India

The chief minister is the chief executive of the Indian state. In accordance with the Constitution of India, the governor is a state's de jure head, but de facto executive authority rests with the chief minister. Following elections to the legislative assembly, the state's governor usually invites the party (or coalition) with a majority of seats to form the government. The governor appoints the chief minister, whose council of ministers are collectively responsible to the assembly. Given that he has the confidence of the assembly, the chief minister's term is for five years and is subject to no term limits.

Here listed are the chief ministers who have served for more than 10 years in office. As of 24 October 2026, 45 chief ministers have served for more than 10 years; of these, only four female chief ministers are listed here. The chief ministers from the states of Jharkhand, Karnataka, Telangana, Uttar Pradesh and Uttarakhand have not served for 10 years in office or more, and currently there are four chief ministers who are incumbents and continue to serve.

The longest-serving chief minister is the former Chief Minister of Sikkim Pawan Kumar Chamling of the Sikkim Democratic Front, who served from 12 December 1994 to 26 May 2019 for 24 years and 165 days. Former Chief Minister of Bihar Nitish Kumar has the record of most terms (ten) as chief minister. The Chief Minister of Nagaland Neiphiu Rio is the longest-serving current chief minister. (Note: A term is defined as a continuous period between taking office and resignation of a particular chief minister.)

== List ==
Key

- * Incumbent chief minister

#	Portrait	Name	State/UT	Term of office			Political party
1.		Pawan Kumar Chamling	Sikkim	12 December 1994	26 May 2019	24 years, 165 days	Sikkim Democratic Front
2.		Naveen Patnaik	Odisha	5 March 2000	12 June 2024	24 years, 99 days	Biju Janata Dal
3.		Jyoti Basu	West Bengal	21 June 1977	5 November 2000	23 years, 137 days	Communist Party of India (Marxist)
4.		Gegong Apang	Arunachal Pradesh	18 January 1980	19 January 1999	22 years, 250 days	Indian National Congress
4.		Gegong Apang	Arunachal Pradesh	18 January 1980	19 January 1999	22 years, 250 days	Arunachal Congress
4.		Gegong Apang	Arunachal Pradesh	3 August 2003	9 April 2007	22 years, 250 days	United Democratic Front
4.		Gegong Apang	Arunachal Pradesh	3 August 2003	9 April 2007	22 years, 250 days	Bharatiya Janata Party
4.		Gegong Apang	Arunachal Pradesh	3 August 2003	9 April 2007	22 years, 250 days	Indian National Congress
5.		Lal Thanhawla	Mizoram	5 May 1984	21 August 1986	22 years, 60 days	Indian National Congress
5.		Lal Thanhawla	Mizoram	24 January 1989	3 December 1998	22 years, 60 days	Indian National Congress
5.		Lal Thanhawla	Mizoram	11 December 2008	15 December 2018	22 years, 60 days	Indian National Congress
6.		Virbhadra Singh	Himachal Pradesh	8 April 1983	5 March 1990	21 years, 13 days	Indian National Congress
6.		Virbhadra Singh	Himachal Pradesh	3 December 1993	24 March 1998	21 years, 13 days	Indian National Congress
6.		Virbhadra Singh	Himachal Pradesh	6 March 2003	30 December 2007	21 years, 13 days	Indian National Congress
6.		Virbhadra Singh	Himachal Pradesh	25 December 2012	27 December 2017	21 years, 13 days	Indian National Congress
7.		Manik Sarkar	Tripura	11 March 1998	9 March 2018	19 years, 363 days	Communist Party of India (Marxist)
8.		Neiphiu Rio	Nagaland	6 March 2003	3 January 2008	19 years, 241 days	Naga People's Front
8.		Neiphiu Rio	Nagaland	12 March 2008	24 May 2014	19 years, 241 days	Naga People's Front
8.		Neiphiu Rio	Nagaland	8 March 2018	Incumbent	19 years, 241 days	Nationalist Democratic Progressive Party
8.		Neiphiu Rio	Nagaland	8 March 2018	Incumbent	19 years, 241 days	Naga People's Front
9.		Nitish Kumar	Bihar	3 March 2000	10 March 2000	19 years, 237 days	Samata Party
9.		Nitish Kumar	Bihar	24 November 2005	20 May 2014	19 years, 237 days	Janata Dal (United)
9.		Nitish Kumar	Bihar	22 February 2015	14 April 2026	19 years, 237 days	Janata Dal (United)
10.		M. Karunanidhi	Tamil Nadu	10 February 1969	31 January 1976	18 years, 362 days	Dravida Munnetra Kazhagam
10.		M. Karunanidhi	Tamil Nadu	27 January 1989	30 January 1991	18 years, 362 days	Dravida Munnetra Kazhagam
10.		M. Karunanidhi	Tamil Nadu	13 May 1996	14 May 2001	18 years, 362 days	Dravida Munnetra Kazhagam
10.		M. Karunanidhi	Tamil Nadu	13 May 2006	16 May 2011	18 years, 362 days	Dravida Munnetra Kazhagam
11.		Parkash Singh Badal	Punjab	27 March 1970	14 June 1971	18 years, 350 days	Shiromani Akali Dal
11.		Parkash Singh Badal	Punjab	20 June 1977	17 February 1980	18 years, 350 days	Shiromani Akali Dal
11.		Parkash Singh Badal	Punjab	12 February 1997	26 February 2002	18 years, 350 days	Shiromani Akali Dal
11.		Parkash Singh Badal	Punjab	1 March 2007	16 March 2017	18 years, 350 days	Shiromani Akali Dal
12.		Yashwant Singh Parmar	Himachal Pradesh	8 March 1952	31 October 1956	18 years, 83 days	Indian National Congress
12.		Yashwant Singh Parmar	Himachal Pradesh	1 July 1963	28 January 1977	18 years, 83 days	Indian National Congress
13.		N. Rangaswamy	Puducherry	27 October 2001	3 September 2008	17 years, 137 days	Indian National Congress
13.		N. Rangaswamy	Puducherry	16 May 2011	5 June 2016	17 years, 137 days	All India N.R. Congress
13.		N. Rangaswamy	Puducherry	7 May 2021	Incumbent	17 years, 137 days	All India N.R. Congress
14.		Shivraj Singh Chouhan	Madhya Pradesh	29 November 2005	17 December 2018	16 years, 284 days	Bharatiya Janata Party
14.		Shivraj Singh Chouhan	Madhya Pradesh	23 March 2020	12 December 2023	16 years, 284 days	Bharatiya Janata Party
15.		Mohan Lal Sukhadia	Rajasthan	13 November 1954	13 March 1967	16 years, 194 days	Indian National Congress
15.		Mohan Lal Sukhadia	Rajasthan	26 April 1967	9 July 1971	16 years, 194 days	Indian National Congress
16.		N. Chandrababu Naidu	Andhra Pradesh	1 September 1995	14 May 2004	16 years, 13 days	Telugu Desam Party
16.		N. Chandrababu Naidu	Andhra Pradesh	8 June 2014	30 May 2019	16 years, 13 days	Telugu Desam Party
16.		N. Chandrababu Naidu	Andhra Pradesh	12 June 2024	Incumbent	16 years, 13 days	Telugu Desam Party
17.		Pratapsingh Rane	Goa	16 January 1980	27 March 1990	15 years, 325 days	Indian National Congress
17.		Pratapsingh Rane	Goa	16 December 1994	29 July 1998	15 years, 325 days	Indian National Congress
17.		Pratapsingh Rane	Goa	3 February 2005	4 March 2005	15 years, 325 days	Indian National Congress
17.		Pratapsingh Rane	Goa	7 June 2005	8 June 2007	15 years, 325 days	Indian National Congress
18.		S. C. Jamir	Nagaland	18 April 1980	5 June 1980	15 years, 151 days	United Democratic Front-Progressive
18.		S. C. Jamir	Nagaland	18 November 1982	29 October 1986	15 years, 151 days	United Democratic Front-Progressive
18.		S. C. Jamir	Nagaland	25 January 1989	16 May 1990	15 years, 151 days	Indian National Congress
18.		S. C. Jamir	Nagaland	22 February 1993	6 March 2003	15 years, 151 days	Indian National Congress
19.		Sheila Dikshit	National Capital Territory of Delhi	3 December 1998	28 December 2013	15 years, 25 days	Indian National Congress
20.		Raman Singh	Chhattisgarh	7 December 2003	17 December 2018	15 years, 10 days	Bharatiya Janata Party
21.		Okram Ibobi Singh	Manipur	7 March 2002	15 March 2017	15 years, 8 days	Indian National Congress
22.		Tarun Gogoi	Assam	18 May 2001	24 May 2016	15 years, 6 days	Indian National Congress
23.		Ashok Gehlot	Rajasthan	1 December 1998	8 December 2003	15 years, 6 days	Indian National Congress
23.		Ashok Gehlot	Rajasthan	12 December 2008	13 December 2013	15 years, 6 days	Indian National Congress
23.		Ashok Gehlot	Rajasthan	17 December 2018	15 December 2023	15 years, 6 days	Indian National Congress
24.		Zoramthanga	Mizoram	3 December 1998	11 December 2008	15 years, 0 days	Mizo National Front
24.		Zoramthanga	Mizoram	15 December 2018	7 December 2023	15 years, 0 days	Mizo National Front
25.		Mamata Banerjee	West Bengal	20 May 2011	8 May 2026	14 years, 353 days	Trinamool Congress
26.	–	Williamson A. Sangma	Meghalaya	2 April 1970	10 March 1978	14 years, 221 days	All Party Hill Leaders Conference
26.	–	Williamson A. Sangma	Meghalaya	7 May 1981	2 March 1983	14 years, 221 days	Indian National Congress
26.	–	Williamson A. Sangma	Meghalaya	2 April 1983	6 February 1988	14 years, 221 days	Indian National Congress
27.		Bidhan Chandra Roy	West Bengal	23 January 1948	1 July 1962	14 years, 159 days	Indian National Congress
28.		J. Jayalalithaa	Tamil Nadu	24 June 1991	12 May 1996	14 years, 124 days	All India Anna Dravida Munnetra Kazhagam
28.		J. Jayalalithaa	Tamil Nadu	14 May 2001	21 September 2001	14 years, 124 days	All India Anna Dravida Munnetra Kazhagam
28.		J. Jayalalithaa	Tamil Nadu	2 March 2002	12 May 2006	14 years, 124 days	All India Anna Dravida Munnetra Kazhagam
28.		J. Jayalalithaa	Tamil Nadu	16 May 2011	27 September 2014	14 years, 124 days	All India Anna Dravida Munnetra Kazhagam
28.		J. Jayalalithaa	Tamil Nadu	23 May 2015	5 December 2016	14 years, 124 days	All India Anna Dravida Munnetra Kazhagam
29.	–	Nar Bahadur Bhandari	Sikkim	18 October 1979	11 May 1984	13 years, 277 days	Sikkim Janata Parishad
29.	–	Nar Bahadur Bhandari	Sikkim	8 March 1985	18 May 1994	13 years, 277 days	Sikkim Sangram Parishad
30.		Janaki Ballabh Patnaik	Odisha	9 June 1980	7 December 1989	13 years, 155 days	Indian National Congress
30.		Janaki Ballabh Patnaik	Odisha	15 March 1995	17 February 1999	13 years, 155 days	Indian National Congress
31.		Shri Krishna Sinha	Bihar	15 August 1947	31 January 1961	13 years, 51 days	Indian National Congress
32.		Bimala Prasad Chaliha	Assam	28 December 1957	11 November 1970	12 years, 318 days	Indian National Congress
33.		Narendra Modi	Gujarat	7 October 2001	22 May 2014	12 years, 227 days	Bharatiya Janata Party
34.		Bhajan Lal	Haryana	28 June 1979	23 May 1982	11 years, 300 days	Janata Party
34.		Bhajan Lal	Haryana	23 May 1982	5 June 1986	11 years, 300 days	Indian National Congress
34.		Bhajan Lal	Haryana	23 June 1991	11 May 1996	11 years, 300 days	Indian National Congress
35.		Bansi Lal	Haryana	21 May 1968	1 December 1975	11 years, 283 days	Indian National Congress
35.		Bansi Lal	Haryana	5 June 1986	20 June 1987	11 years, 283 days	Indian National Congress
35.		Bansi Lal	Haryana	11 May 1996	24 July 1999	11 years, 283 days	Haryana Vikas Party
36.		Vasantrao Naik	Maharashtra	5 December 1963	21 February 1975	11 years, 78 days	Indian National Congress
37.		Farooq Abdullah	Jammu and Kashmir	8 September 1982	2 July 1984	11 years, 15 days	Jammu & Kashmir National Conference
37.		Farooq Abdullah	Jammu and Kashmir	7 November 1986	19 January 1990	11 years, 15 days	Jammu & Kashmir National Conference
37.		Farooq Abdullah	Jammu and Kashmir	9 October 1996	18 October 2002	11 years, 15 days	Jammu & Kashmir National Conference
38.		E. K. Nayanar	Kerala	25 January 1980	20 October 1981	10 years, 355 days	Communist Party of India (Marxist)
38.		E. K. Nayanar	Kerala	26 March 1987	24 June 1991	10 years, 355 days	Communist Party of India (Marxist)
38.		E. K. Nayanar	Kerala	20 May 1996	17 May 2001	10 years, 355 days	Communist Party of India (Marxist)
39.		M. O. H. Farook	Puducherry	9 April 1967	5 March 1968	10 years, 248 days	Indian National Congress
39.		M. O. H. Farook	Puducherry	17 March 1969	3 January 1974	10 years, 248 days	Dravida Munnetra Kazhagam
39.		M. O. H. Farook	Puducherry	17 March 1985	7 March 1990	10 years, 248 days	Indian National Congress
40.		Buddhadeb Bhattacharjee	West Bengal	6 November 2000	13 May 2011	10 years, 188 days	Communist Party of India (Marxist)
41.		Bhairon Singh Shekhawat	Rajasthan	22 June 1977	16 February 1980	10 years, 156 days	Janata Party
41.		Bhairon Singh Shekhawat	Rajasthan	4 March 1990	15 December 1992	10 years, 156 days	Bharatiya Janata Party
41.		Bhairon Singh Shekhawat	Rajasthan	4 December 1993	1 December 1998	10 years, 156 days	Bharatiya Janata Party
42.		Pema Khandu	Arunachal Pradesh	17 July 2016	Incumbent	10 years, 99 days	Indian National Congress
42.		Pema Khandu	Arunachal Pradesh	17 July 2016	Incumbent	10 years, 99 days	People's Party of Arunachal
42.		Pema Khandu	Arunachal Pradesh	17 July 2016	Incumbent	10 years, 99 days	Bharatiya Janata Party
43.		M. G. Ramachandran	Tamil Nadu	30 June 1977	17 February 1980	10 years, 65 days	All India Anna Dravida Munnetra Kazhagam
43.		M. G. Ramachandran	Tamil Nadu	9 June 1980	24 December 1987	10 years, 65 days	All India Anna Dravida Munnetra Kazhagam
44.		Nripen Chakraborty	Tripura	5 January 1978	5 February 1988	10 years, 31 days	Communist Party of India (Marxist)
45.		Vasundhara Raje	Rajasthan	8 December 2003	12 December 2008	10 years, 8 days	Bharatiya Janata Party
45.		Vasundhara Raje	Rajasthan	13 December 2013	17 December 2018	10 years, 8 days	Bharatiya Janata Party
46.		Digvijaya Singh	Madhya Pradesh	7 December 1993	8 December 2003	10 years, 1 day	Indian National Congress

== See also ==
- List of current Indian chief ministers
- List of female chief ministers in India
- List of chief ministers from the Bharatiya Janata Party
- List of chief ministers from the Communist Party of India (Marxist)
- List of chief ministers from the Indian National Congress
- List of Indian chief ministers who died in office
- List of longest-serving members of the Union Council of Ministers
- List of longest-serving members of the Parliament of India
