= Vipin Jain =

Indian politician

Vipin Jain (born 1975) is an Indian politician from Madhya Pradesh. He is an MLA from Mandsaur Assembly constituency in Mandsaur District. He won the 2023 Madhya Pradesh Legislative Assembly election representing the Indian National Congress.

== Early life and education ==
Jain is from Mandsaur, Madhya Pradesh. He is the son of Subhash Chandra Jain. He passed Class 10 at Katju Higher Secondary, Dalauda in 1993 and later discontinued his studies.

== Career ==
Jain won from Mandaur Assembly constituency representing Indian National Congress in the 2023 Madhya Pradesh Legislative Assembly election. He polled 105,316 votes and defeated his nearest rival, Yashpal Singh Sisodiya of the Bharatiya Janata Party, by a margin of 2,049 votes.

In October 2024, along with Rajya Sabha MP Bansilal Gurjar, the Mandsaur MLA requested the finance minister Nirmala Sitharaman to quickly declare the policy to help the farmers in Malwa-Mewar region.
