= List of chief ministers from the Indian National Congress =

Political party from India

The Indian National Congress (INC) is one of the two major parties in the political system of the Republic of India. As of May 2026, INC is in power in the four states: Himachal Pradesh, Karnataka, Kerala and Telangana. In Tamil Nadu, Jharkhand and Jammu and Kashmir, it shares power with alliance partners Tamilaga Vettri Kazhagam, Jharkhand Mukti Morcha and Jammu & Kashmir National Conference respectively. In the post-independence era, the party has governed most of India's states and union territories, and by extension, has the status of a "national party" in India.

According to the Constitution of India, at the state level, the governor is de jure head, but de facto executive authority rests with the chief minister. Therefore, the chief minister is considered the head of government in his jurisdiction. Following elections to the state legislative assembly, the governor usually invites the party or coalition with a majority of seats to form the government. The chief minister is appointed by the governor, who also appoints other ministers, known as the council of ministers, based on the chief minister's advice. The council of ministers is collectively responsible to the state legislative assembly, ensuring unified support for all governmental decisions. The Chief Minister's term is normally limited to five years if they have the assembly's confidence. There are no limits to the number of terms the chief minister can serve. The deputy chief minister is a member of the state government and usually the second highest ranking executive officer of their state's council of ministers. Because the deputy chief minister is not a constitutional office, the Chief Minister has significant influence over the scope of authority and duties the deputy chief minister can perform. A deputy chief minister usually holds a cabinet portfolio such as home minister or finance minister. In the parliamentary system of government, the chief minister is treated as the "first among equals" in the cabinet; the position of deputy chief minister is used to bring political stability and strength within a coalition government.

Five of the INC chief ministers have been women – Sucheta Kripalani for Uttar Pradesh, Nandini Satpathy for Odisha, Anwara Taimur for Assam, Rajinder Kaur Bhattal for Punjab, and Sheila Dikshit for Delhi. The longest-serving female chief minister was Sheila Dikshit, who served as the chief minister of Delhi for over fifteen years. Okram Ibobi Singh, who was chief minister of Manipur for 15 years and 11 days between March 2002 and March 2017, has been the longest-serving chief minister of the state. Tarun Gogoi held the position of chief minister in Assam for a period of 15 years and 6 days. A leader of the Indian National Congress, Virbhadra Singh holds the distinction of being the longest serving chief minister of Himachal Pradesh, holding the office from 1983 to 1990, from 1993 to 1998, from 2003 to 2007 and finally from 2012 to 2017. Gegong Apang has not only been the longest-serving chief minister from the INC but also in the history of Arunachal Pradesh. Apang also holds the record for the fourth-longest-serving chief minister of an Indian state, holding the post for over twenty-two years.

== Andhra Pradesh ==
Chief ministers of Andhra State (1952-1957) (Note: The Andhra State was established on 1 October 1953, following the Andhra movement.)
Portrait	Name	Constituency	Term of office			Assembly
Photographic portrait of	Tanguturi Prakasam	N/A	1 October 1953	15 November 1954	1 year, 45 days	N/A
Photographic portrait of	Bezawada Gopala Reddy	Atmakur	28 March 1955	1 November 1956	1 year, 218 days	1st

Chief ministers of United Andhra Pradesh (Note: United Andhra Pradesh, was officially established on 1 November 1956, through the enactment of the States Reorganisation Act in August 1956. This led to the dissolution of Hyderabad State, with its divisions becoming part of Mysore State and Bombay State.)
Portrait	Name	Constituency	Term of office			Assembly
Photographic portrait of	Neelam Sanjiva Reddy	Kalahasti	1 November 1956	11 January 1960	3 years, 71 days	1st
Photographic portrait of	Neelam Sanjiva Reddy	Dhone	12 March 1962	20 February 1964	1 year, 345 days	3rd
Photographic portrait of	Damodaram Sanjivayya	Kurnool	11 January 1960	12 March 1962	2 years, 60 days	2nd
Photographic portrait of	Kasu Brahmananda Reddy	Narasaraopet	21 February 1964	30 September 1971	7 years, 221 days	4th
Photographic portrait of	P. V. Narasimha Rao	Manthani	30 September 1971	10 January 1973	1 year, 102 days	5th
	Jalagam Vengala Rao	Vemsoor	10 December 1973	6 March 1978	4 years, 86 days	6th
Photographic portrait of	Marri Chenna Reddy	Medchal	6 March 1978	11 October 1980	2 years, 219 days	6th
Photographic portrait of	Marri Chenna Reddy	Sanathnagar	3 December 1989	17 December 1990	1 year, 14 days	9th
Photographic portrait of	Tanguturi Anjaiah	MLC	11 October 1980	24 February 1982	1 year, 136 days	6th
	Bhavanam Venkatarami Reddy	MLC	24 February 1982	20 September 1982	208 days	6th
	Kotla Vijaya Bhaskara Reddy	Kurnool	20 September 1982	9 January 1983	111 days	6th
	Kotla Vijaya Bhaskara Reddy	Panyam	9 October 1992	12 December 1994	2 years, 64 days	9th
Photographic portrait of	N. Janardhana Reddy	Venkatagiri	17 December 1990	9 October 1992	1 year, 297 days	9th
Photographic portrait of	Y. S. Rajasekhara Reddy	Pulivendla	14 May 2004	2 September 2009	5 years, 111 days	12th
Photographic portrait of	K. Rosaiah	Guntur	3 September 2009	24 November 2010	1 year, 82 days	13th
Photographic portrait of	N. Kiran Kumar Reddy	Pileru	25 November 2010	1 March 2014	3 years, 96 days	13th

== Arunachal Pradesh ==
Chief ministers of Arunachal Pradesh
Portrait	Name	Constituency	Term in office			Assembly
Photographic portrait of Gegong Apang	Gegong Apang	Tuting-Yingkiong	18 January 1980	19 February 1985	5 years, 32 days	2nd
Photographic portrait of Gegong Apang	Gegong Apang	Tuting-Yingkiong	21 February 1985	10 March 1990	5 years, 17 days	3rd
Photographic portrait of Gegong Apang	Gegong Apang	Tuting-Yingkiong	16 March 1990	9 April 1995	5 years, 24 days	4th
Photographic portrait of Gegong Apang	Gegong Apang	Tuting-Yingkiong	17 April 1995	21 May 1999	4 years, 34 days	5th
Photographic portrait of Gegong Apang	Gegong Apang	Tuting-Yingkiong	3 August 2003	9 April 2007	3 years, 249 days	7th
Photographic portrait of Mukut Mithi	Mukut Mithi	Roing	19 January 1999	3 August 2003	4 years, 196 days	6th
Photographic portrait of Dorjee Khandu	Dorjee Khandu	Mukto	9 April 2007	30 April 2011	4 years, 21 days	8th
Photographic portrait of Jarbom Gamlin	Jarbom Gamlin	Liromoba	5 May 2011	1 November 2011	180 days	9th
Photographic portrait of Nabam Tuki	Nabam Tuki	Sagalee	1 November 2011	26 January 2016	4 years, 86 days	9th
Photographic portrait of Nabam Tuki	Nabam Tuki	Sagalee	13 July 2016	17 July 2016	4 days	9th
Photographic portrait of Pema Khandu	Pema Khandu (Note: Khandu became the chief minister in July 2016 while being a member of the INC. He joined the People's Party of Arunachal in September 2016, and later defected to the BJP in December 2016.)	Mukto	17 July 2016	16 September 2016	61 days	9th

== Assam ==
Chief ministers of Assam
Portrait	Name	Constituency	Term of office			Assembly
Photographic portrait of Gopinath Bordoloi	Gopinath Bordoloi	Kamrup Sadar (South)	19 September 1938	17 November 1939	1 year, 59 days	1st Provincial
Photographic portrait of Gopinath Bordoloi	Gopinath Bordoloi	Kamrup Sadar (South)	11 February 1946	25 January 1950	3 years, 348 days	2nd Provincial
Photographic portrait of Gopinath Bordoloi	Gopinath Bordoloi	Kamrup Sadar (South)	26 January 1950	6 August 1950	192 days	2nd Provincial
Photographic portrait of Bishnu Ram Medhi	Bishnu Ram Medhi	Hajo	9 August 1950	27 December 1957	7 years, 140 days	2nd Provincial
	Bimala Prasad Chaliha	Sonari	28 December 1957	6 November 1970	12 years, 313 days	2nd
	Bimala Prasad Chaliha	Sonari	28 December 1957	6 November 1970	12 years, 313 days	3rd
	Mahendra Mohan Choudhry	Gauhati East	11 November 1970	30 January 1972	1 year, 80 days	4th
Photographic portrait of Sarat Chandra Singha	Sarat Chandra Singha	Kokrajhar East	31 January 1972	12 March 1978	6 years, 40 days	5th
	Anwara Taimur	Dalgaon	6 December 1980	30 June 1981	206 days	6th
	Keshab Chandra Gogoi	Dibrugarh	13 January 1982	19 March 1982	65 days	6th
Photographic portrait of Hiteswar Saikia	Hiteswar Saikia	Nazira	27 February 1983	23 December 1985	2 years, 299 days	7th
Photographic portrait of Hiteswar Saikia	Hiteswar Saikia	Nazira	30 June 1991	22 April 1996	4 years, 297 days	8th
Photographic portrait of Bhumidhar Barman	Bhumidhar Barman	Barkhetry	22 April 1996	14 May 1996	22 days	9th
Photographic portrait of Tarun Gogoi	Tarun Gogoi	Titabar	17 May 2001	24 May 2016	15 years, 6 days	11th
Photographic portrait of Tarun Gogoi	Tarun Gogoi	Titabar	17 May 2001	24 May 2016	15 years, 6 days	12th
Photographic portrait of Tarun Gogoi	Tarun Gogoi	Titabar	17 May 2001	24 May 2016	15 years, 6 days	13th

== Bihar ==
Premier of Bihar
Portrait	Name	Constituency	Term in office			Assembly
Photographic portrait of Shri Krishna Sinha	Shri Krishna Sinha	N/A	20 July 1937	31 October 1939	2 years, 103 days	N/A
Photographic portrait of Shri Krishna Sinha	Shri Krishna Sinha	N/A	23 March 1946	25 January 1950	3 years, 308 days	N/A

Chief ministers of Bihar
Portrait	Name	Constituency	Term of office			Assembly
Photographic portrait of Shri Krishna Sinha	Shri Krishna Sinha	Basantpur West	2 April 1946	31 January 1961	13 years, 138 days	1st
Photographic portrait of Shri Krishna Sinha	Shri Krishna Sinha	Basantpur West	2 April 1946	31 January 1961	13 years, 138 days	2nd
	Deep Narayan Singh	Hajipur	1 February 1961	18 February 1961	17 days	2nd
Photographic portrait of Binodanand Jha	Binodanand Jha	Rajmahal	18 February 1961	2 October 1963	2 years, 226 days	3rd
Photographic portrait of K. B. Sahay	K. B. Sahay	Patna West	2 October 1963	5 March 1967	3 years, 154 days	3rd
	Satish Prasad Singh	Parbatta	28 January 1968	1 February 1968	5 days	4th
	B. P. Mandal	MLC	1 February 1968	2 March 1968	31 days	4th
	Harihar Singh	Nayagram	26 February 1969	22 June 1969	117 days	5th
Photographic portrait of Daroga Prasad Rai	Daroga Prasad Rai	Parsa	16 February 1970	22 December 1970	310 days	5th
Photographic portrait of Bhola Paswan Shastri	Bhola Paswan Shastri	Korha	2 June 1971	9 January 1972	222 days	5th
Photographic portrait of Kedar Pandey	Kedar Pandey	Nautan	19 March 1972	2 July 1973	1 year, 105 days	6th
Photographic portrait of Abdul Gafoor	Abdul Gafoor	MLC	2 July 1973	11 April 1975	1 year, 283 days	6th
	Jagannath Mishra	Jhanjharpur	11 April 1975	30 April 1977	2 years, 19 days	7th
	Jagannath Mishra	Jhanjharpur	8 June 1980	14 August 1983	3 years, 67 days	8th
	Jagannath Mishra	Jhanjharpur	6 December 1989	10 March 1990	94 days	9th
	Chandrashekhar Singh	Jhajha	14 August 1983	12 March 1985	1 year, 210 days	8th
Photographic portrait of Bindeshwari Dubey	Bindeshwari Dubey	Shahpur	12 March 1985	13 February 1988	2 years, 338 days	9th
Photographic portrait of Bhagwat Jha Azad	Bhagwat Jha Azad	MLC	14 February 1988	10 March 1989	1 year, 24 days	9th
Photographic portrait of Satyendra Narayan Sinha	Satyendra Narayan Sinha	MLC	11 March 1989	6 December 1989	270 days	9th

== Chhattisgarh ==
Chief ministers of Chhattisgarh
Portrait	Name	Constituency	Term in office			Assembly
Photographic portrait of Ajit Jogi	Ajit Jogi	Marwahi	1 November 2000	5 December 2003	3 years, 34 days	Interim (Note: The first Legislative Assembly of Chhattisgarh was constituted by the MLAs elected in the 1998 Madhya Pradesh Legislative Assembly election, whose constituencies were in the newly formed Chhattisgarh.)
Photographic portrait of Bhupesh Baghel	Bhupesh Baghel	Patan	17 December 2018	3 December 2023	4 years, 351 days	5th

== Delhi ==
Chief ministers of Delhi (Part-C State) (Note: Part-C States were a category of states and territories that existed under the Constitution of India before they were reorganized or merged into other categories of states. This classification was part of the First Schedule of the Indian Constitution (which lists the states and union territories), and it existed from 1950 until the States Reorganisation Act of 1956.)
Portrait	Name	Constituency	Term of office			Assembly
Photographic portrait of Brahm Prakash	Brahm Prakash	Nangloi Jat	17 March 1952	12 February 1955	2 years, 332 days	Interim
Photographic portrait of Gurmukh Nihal Singh	Gurmukh Nihal Singh	Daryaganj	12 February 1955	1 November 1956	1 year, 263 days	Interim

Chief Minister of Delhi (UT) (Note: Delhi became a Union Territory after the States Reorganisation Act of 1956.)
Portrait	Name	Constituency	Term in office			Assembly
Photographic portrait of Sheila Dikshit	Sheila Dikshit	New Delhi	3 December 1998	1 December 2003	4 years, 363 days	2nd
Photographic portrait of Sheila Dikshit	Sheila Dikshit	New Delhi	2 December 2003	29 November 2008	4 years, 363 days	3rd
Photographic portrait of Sheila Dikshit	Sheila Dikshit	New Delhi	30 November 2008	28 December 2013	5 years, 28 days	4th

== Goa ==
Chief Minister of Union territory of Goa, Daman and Diu (Note: The Union Territory of Goa, Daman, and Diu was formed after India's independence in 1947 and was the result of the annexation of the Portuguese-controlled territories of Goa, Daman, and Diu into the Indian Union.)
Portrait	Name	Constituency	Term of office			Assembly
Photographic portrait of Pratapsingh Rane	Pratapsingh Rane	Sattari	7 January 1985	30 May 1987	2 years, 143 days	4th
Photographic portrait of Pratapsingh Rane	Pratapsingh Rane	Poriem	30 May 1987	9 January 1990	2 years, 224 days	5th

Chief ministers of Goa (State) (Note: On May 30, 1987, Goa was granted statehood and became the 25th state of India under the provisions of the Goa, Daman and Diu Reorganisation Act, 1987.)
Portrait	Name	Constituency	Term of office			Assembly
Photographic portrait of Pratapsingh Rane	Pratapsingh Rane	Poriem	9 January 1990	27 March 1990	77 days	1st
Photographic portrait of Pratapsingh Rane	Pratapsingh Rane	Poriem	16 December 1994	29 July 1998	3 years, 225 days	2nd
Photographic portrait of Pratapsingh Rane	Pratapsingh Rane	Poriem	3 February 2005	4 March 2005	29 days	4th
Photographic portrait of Pratapsingh Rane	Pratapsingh Rane	Poriem	7 June 2005	7 June 2007	2 years, 0 days	4th
	Ravi Naik	Marcaim	25 January 1991	18 May 1993	2 years, 113 days	1st
	Ravi Naik	Marcaim	2 April 1994	8 April 1994	6 days	1st
Photographic portrait of Wilfred de Souza	Wilfred de Souza	Saligao	18 May 1993	2 April 1994	319 days	1st
Photographic portrait of Wilfred de Souza	Wilfred de Souza	Saligao	8 April 1994	16 December 1994	252 days	1st
Photographic portrait of Wilfred de Souza	Wilfred de Souza	Saligao	29 July 1998	23 November 1998	117 days	2nd
	Luizinho Faleiro	Navelim	26 November 1998	8 February 1999	77 days	2nd
	Luizinho Faleiro	Navelim	9 June 1999	24 November 1999	168 days	3rd
Photographic portrait of Digambar Kamat	Digambar Kamat	Madgaon	8 June 2007	8 March 2012	4 years, 274 days	5th

== Gujarat ==
Prime ministers of Kathiawar/Saurashtra (1948–50)
Portrait	Name	Constituency	Term in office			Assembly
Photographic portrait of U. N. Dhebar	U. N. Dhebar	N/A	6 March 1952	31 October 1956	4 years, 239 days	Interim

Chief ministers of Saurashtra (1950–56) (Note: In 1948, the Saurashtra region, consisting of 215 princely states, was unified as a part of the Indian Union.)
Portrait	Name	Constituency	Term in office			Assembly
Photographic portrait of U. N. Dhebar	U. N. Dhebar	N/A	26 January 1950	19 December 1954	4 years, 327 days	Interim
	Rasiklal Umedchand Parikh	N/A	26 January 1950	19 December 1954	4 years, 327 days	2nd

Chief ministers of Gujarat (Note: In 1956, as part of the States Reorganisation Act, Gujarat was formed as a separate state and Saurashtra became a part of the newly formed Gujarat state.)
Portrait	Name	Constituency	Term of office			Assembly
Photographic portrait of Jivraj Narayan Mehta	Jivraj Narayan Mehta	Amreli	1 May 1960	3 March 1962	3 years, 141 days	Interim
Photographic portrait of Jivraj Narayan Mehta	Jivraj Narayan Mehta	Amreli	3 March 1962	19 September 1963	3 years, 141 days	2nd
Photographic portrait of Balwantrai Mehta	Balwantrai Mehta	Bhavnagar	25 February 1963	19 September 1965	2 years, 206 days	2nd
	Hitendra Kanaiyalal Desai	Olpad	19 September 1965	3 April 1967	1 year, 196 days	2nd
	Hitendra Kanaiyalal Desai	Olpad	3 April 1967	12 November 1969	2 years, 223 days	3rd
	Hitendra Kanaiyalal Desai	Olpad	12 November 1969	12 May 1971	1 year, 181 days	3rd
	Ghanshyam Oza	Dahegam	17 March 1972	17 July 1973	1 year, 122 days	4th
	Chimanbhai Patel	Sankheda	17 July 1973	9 February 1974	207 days	4th
	Chimanbhai Patel	Sankheda	4 March 1990	17 February 1994	3 years, 350 days	8th
	Madhav Singh Solanki	Bhadran	24 December 1976	10 April 1977	107 days	5th
	Madhav Singh Solanki	Bhadran	7 June 1980	10 March 1985	4 years, 276 days	6th
	Madhav Singh Solanki	Bhadran	11 March 1985	6 July 1985	117 days	7th
	Madhav Singh Solanki	Bhadran	10 December 1989	3 March 1990	83 days	7th
	Amarsinh Chaudhary	Vyara	6 July 1985	9 December 1989	4 years, 156 days	7th
	Chimanbhai Patel	Unjha	25 October 1990	17 February 1994	3 years, 115 days	8th
	Chhabildas Mehta	Mahuva	17 February 1994	31 March 1995	1 year, 42 days	8th

== Haryana ==
Chief ministers of Haryana
Portrait	Name	Constituency	Term of office			Assembly
Photographic portrait of Bhagwat Dayal Sharma	Bhagwat Dayal Sharma	Jhajjar	1 November 1966	23 March 1967	142 days	1st
	Bansi Lal	Tosham	22 May 1968	30 November 1975	7 years, 192 days	3rd
	Bansi Lal	Tosham	5 July 1985	19 June 1987	1 year, 349 days	6th
Photographic portrait of Banarsi Das Gupta	Banarsi Das Gupta	Bhiwani	1 December 1975	30 April 1977	1 year, 150 days	4th
Photographic portrait of Bhajan Lal Bishnoi	Bhajan Lal Bishnoi	Adampur	22 January 1980	5 July 1985	5 years, 164 days	6th
Photographic portrait of Bhajan Lal Bishnoi	Bhajan Lal Bishnoi	Adampur	23 July 1991	9 May 1996	4 years, 291 days	8th
Photographic portrait of Bhupinder Singh Hooda	Bhupinder Singh Hooda	Garhi Sampla-Kiloi	5 March 2005	26 October 2014	9 years, 235 days	11th

== Himachal Pradesh ==
Chief ministers of Bilaspur State (1950–1954)
Portrait	Name	Constituency	Term of office			Assembly
	Anand Chand	N/A	12 October 1948	26 January 1950	1 year, 106 days	N/A
	K.S. Himmatsinhji	N/A	26 January 1950	1 July 1954	4 years, 156 days	N/A

Chief ministers of Himachal Pradesh (Union Territory with Legislature) (Note: On January 15, 1950, Himachal Pradesh was officially declared a Union Territory.)
Portrait	Name	Constituency	Term of office			Assembly
Photographic portrait of	Yashwant Singh Parmar	Pachhad	8 March 1952	31 October 1956	4 years, 237 days	1st

Key

- * – Incumbent chief minister

Chief ministers of Himachal Pradesh (Note: Himachal Pradesh officially became a full-fledged state of India on January 25, 1971. This was done through the Himachal Pradesh Statehood Act, 1970.)
Portrait	Name	Constituency	Term of office			Assembly
Photographic portrait of	Yashwant Singh Parmar	Sri Renuka	1 July 1963	28 January 1977	13 years, 211 days	Territorial Council
Photographic portrait of	Yashwant Singh Parmar	Sri Renuka	1 July 1963	28 January 1977	13 years, 211 days	2nd
Photographic portrait of	Thakur Ram Lal	Jubbal-Kotkhai	28 January 1977	30 April 1977	92 days	3rd
Photographic portrait of	Thakur Ram Lal	Jubbal-Kotkhai	14 February 1980	7 April 1983	3 years, 52 days	3rd
Photographic portrait of	Virbhadra Singh	Jubbal-Kotkhai	8 April 1983	8 March 1985	1 year, 334 days	5th
Photographic portrait of	Virbhadra Singh	Jubbal-Kotkhai	8 March 1985	5 March 1990	4 years, 362 days	6th
Photographic portrait of	Virbhadra Singh	Rohru	3 December 1993	23 March 1998	4 years, 110 days	8th
Photographic portrait of	Virbhadra Singh	Rohru	6 March 2003	30 December 2007	4 years, 299 days	10th
Photographic portrait of	Virbhadra Singh	Shimla Rural	25 December 2012	27 December 2017	5 years, 2 days	12th
Photographic portrait of	Sukhvinder Singh Sukhu*	Nadaun	11 December 2022	Incumbent	3 years, 288 days*	14th

== Jammu and Kashmir ==
Prime ministers of Jammu and Kashmir
Portrait	Name	Constituency	Term of office			Assembly
Photographic portrait of Mehr Chand Mahajan	Mehr Chand Mahajan	N/A	15 October 1947	5 March 1948	142 days	3rd
Photographic portrait of Ghulam Mohammed Sadiq	Ghulam Mohammed Sadiq	Tankipura	29 February 1964	30 March 1965	1 year, 30 days	N/A

Chief ministers of Jammu and Kashmir (state)
Portrait	Name	Constituency	Term of office			Assembly
Photographic portrait of Ghulam Mohammed Sadiq	Ghulam Mohammed Sadiq	Tankipura	30 March 1965	21 February 1967	1 year, 328 days	4th
Photographic portrait of Ghulam Mohammed Sadiq	Ghulam Mohammed Sadiq	Amirakadal	21 February 1967	12 December 1971	4 years, 294 days	4th
	Syed Mir Qasim	Verinag	12 December 1971	17 June 1972	188 days	4th
	Syed Mir Qasim	Verinag	17 June 1972	25 February 1975	2 years, 253 days	4th
Photographic portrait of Ghulam Nabi Azad	Ghulam Nabi Azad	Bhaderwah	2 November 2005	11 July 2008	2 years, 252 days	10th

== Karnataka ==
Prime Minister of Mysore State
Portrait	Name	Constituency	Term of office			Assembly
Photographic portrait of K. Chengalaraya Reddy	K. Chengalaraya Reddy	N/A	25 October 1947	26 January 1950	2 years, 93 days	Not established yet

Chief ministers of Mysore State (Note: Mysore State came into being in August 1947 when Maharaja Jayachamarajendra Wodeyar signed the Instrument of Accession to merge the Princely State of Mysore with the Dominion of India.)
Portrait	Name	Constituency	Term of office			Assembly
Photographic portrait of K. Chengalaraya Reddy	K. Chengalaraya Reddy	N/A	26 January 1950	30 March 1952	2 years, 64 days	Legislative; Assembly unestablished
Photographic portrait of Kengal Hanumanthaiah	Kengal Hanumanthaiah	Ramanagara	30 March 1952	19 August 1956	4 years, 142 days	1st
	Kadidal Manjappa	Tirthahalli	19 August 1956	31 October 1956	73 days	1st

Chief ministers of Mysore (following the state's reorganisation) (Note: On 1 November 1956, via the States Reorganisation Act, Mysore State was significantly expanded along linguistic lines. The Kannada-speaking districts of Bombay, Hyderabad and Madras states, as well as the entirety of Coorg, were added to it.)
Portrait	Name	Constituency	Term of office			Assembly
Photographic portrait of S. Nijalingappa	S. Nijalingappa	Molakalmuru	1 November 1956	16 May 1958	1 year, 197 days	1st
Photographic portrait of S. Nijalingappa	S. Nijalingappa	Jamkhandi	21 June 1962	28 May 1968	5 years, 342 days	3rd
Photographic portrait of S. Nijalingappa	S. Nijalingappa	Jamkhandi	21 June 1962	28 May 1968	5 years, 342 days	4th
Photographic portrait of B. D. Jatti	B. D. Jatti	Jamkhandi	16 May 1958	9 March 1962	3 years, 297 days	2nd
	S. R. Kanthi	Hungund	14 March 1962	20 June 1962	98 days	3rd

Chief Minister of Coorg State
Portrait	Name	Constituency	Term of office			Assembly
Photographic portrait of C. M. Poonacha	C. M. Poonacha	N/A	27 March 1952	31 October 1956	4 years, 218 days	1st

Key

- * – Incumbent chief minister

Chief ministers of Karnataka
Portrait	Name	Constituency	Term of office			Assembly	
	D. Devaraj Urs	Hunsur	20 March 1972	31 December 1977	5 years, 286 days	Assembly	5th
	D. Devaraj Urs	Hunsur	28 February 1978	7 January 1980	1 year, 313 days	6th	
	R. Gundu Rao	Somwarpet	12 January 1980	6 January 1983	2 years, 359 days	6th	
	Veerendra Patil	Chincholi	30 November 1989	10 October 1990	314 days	9th	
	S. Bangarappa	Sorab	17 October 1990	19 November 1992	2 years, 33 days	9th	
Photographic portrait of M. Veerappa Moily	M. Veerappa Moily	Karkala	19 November 1992	11 December 1994	2 years, 22 days	9th	
Photographic portrait of S. M. Krishna	S. M. Krishna	Maddur	11 October 1999	28 May 2004	4 years, 230 days	11th	
Photographic portrait of Dharam Singh	Dharam Singh	Jewargi	28 May 2004	2 February 2006	1 year, 250 days	12th	
Photographic portrait of Siddaramaiah	Siddaramaiah	Varuna	13 May 2013	15 May 2018	5 years, 2 days	14th	
Photographic portrait of Siddaramaiah	Siddaramaiah	Varuna	20 May 2023	3 June 2026	14 days	16th	
Photographic portrait of Siddaramaiah	D. K. Shivakumar*	Kanakapura	3 June 2026	Incumbent	114 days	16th	

== Kerala ==
Prime ministers of Travancore
Portrait	Name	Constituency	Term of office			Assembly
Photographic portrait of	Pattom A. Thanu Pillai	N/A	24 March 1948	17 October 1948	210 days	Appointed by Sir Chithira Thirunal; Balarama Varma
	Parur T. K. Narayana Pillai	N/A	22 October 1948	1 July 1949	253 days	Appointed by Sir Chithira Thirunal; Balarama Varma

Chief ministers of Travancore-Cochin (Note: It was formed through the merger of two former kingdoms, Travancore and Cochin on 1 July 1949.)
Portrait	Name	Constituency	Term of office			Assembly
	Paravoor T. K. Narayana Pillai	N/A	1 July 1949	1 March 1951	1 year, 243 days	1st
Photographic portrait of	C. Kesavan	N/A	3 March 1951	12 March 1952	1 year, 11 days	2nd
	A. J. John	N/A	12 March 1952	16 March 1954	2 years, 4 days	2nd
	Panampilly Govinda Menon	N/A	10 February 1955	23 March 1956	1 year, 42 days	3rd

Key

- * – Incumbent chief minister

Chief ministers of Kerala (Note: Kerala was formally created as the 15th state of India on November 1, 1956, through the States Reorganisation Act of 1956.)
Portrait	Name	Constituency	Term of office			Assembly
Photographic portrait of	R. Sankar	Cannanore I	26 September 1962	10 September 1964	1 year, 350 days	2nd
Photographic portrait of	Kannoth Karunakaran	Mala	25 March 1977	27 April 1977	33 days	5th
Photographic portrait of	Kannoth Karunakaran	Mala	28 December 1981	17 March 1982	79 days	6th
Photographic portrait of	Kannoth Karunakaran	Mala	24 May 1982	26 March 1987	4 years, 306 days	7th
Photographic portrait of	Kannoth Karunakaran	Mala	24 June 1991	16 March 1995	3 years, 265 days	9th
Photographic portrait of	A. K. Antony	Kazhakkuttom	27 April 1977	27 October 1978	1 year, 183 days	5th
Photographic portrait of	A. K. Antony	Tirurangadi	22 March 1995	9 May 1996	1 year, 48 days	9th
Photographic portrait of	A. K. Antony	Cherthala	17 May 2001	29 August 2004	3 years, 75 days	11th
	Oommen Chandy	Puthuppally	31 August 2004	12 May 2006	1 year, 254 days	11th
	Oommen Chandy	Puthuppally	18 May 2011	20 May 2016	5 years, 2 days	13th
	V. D. Satheesan*	Paravur	18 May 2026	Incumbent	140 days	16th

== Madhya Pradesh ==
Chief ministers of Vindhya Pradesh (1948–1956)
Portrait	Name	Constituency	Term of office			Assembly
	Awadhesh Pratap Singh	N/A	28 May 1948	15 April 1949	322 days	Not yet created
	Sambhu Nath Shuklan	N/A	31 March 1952	31 October 1956	4 years, 214 days	1st

Chief ministers of Madhya Bharat (1948–1956) (Note: The formation of Madhya Bharat was the result of the integration of various princely states that were located primarily in the central region of India.)
Portrait	Name	Constituency	Term of office			Assembly
Photographic portrait of Liladhar Joshi	Liladhar Joshi	N/A	28 May 1948	1 May 1949	338 days	Not yet created
	Gopikrishna Vijayavargiya	N/A	10 May 1949	18 October 1950	1 year, 161 days	Not yet created
	Takhatmal Jain	N/A	18 October 1950	31 March 1952	1 year, 165 days	Not yet created
	Mishrilal Gangwal	N/A	31 March 1952	16 April 1955	3 years, 16 days	1st

Chief ministers of Bhopal State (1949–1956) (Note: Bhopal State was a princely state in central India that existed from the time of Indian independence in 1947 until its merger with the newly formed state of Madhya Pradesh in 1956.)
Portrait	Name	Constituency	Term in office			Assembly
Photographic portrait of Shankar Dayal Sharma	Shankar Dayal Sharma	N/A	31 March 1952	31 October 1956	4 years, 214 days	1st

Chief ministers of Madhya Pradesh (Note: Madhya Pradesh was created by merging Central Provinces and Berar, Madhya Bharat, Bhopal State, and Vindhya Pradesh.)
Portrait	Name	Constituency	Term of office			Assembly
Photographic portrait of Ravishankar Shukla	Ravishankar Shukla	Saraipali	1 November 1956	31 December 1956	60 days	1st
	Bhagwantrao Mandloi	Khandwa	9 January 1957	30 January 1957	21 days	1st
	Bhagwantrao Mandloi	Khandwa	12 March 1962	29 September 1963	1 year, 201 days	3rd
Photographic portrait of Kailash Nath Katju	Kailash Nath Katju	Jaora	31 January 1957	14 March 1957	5 years, 39 days	2nd
Photographic portrait of Kailash Nath Katju	Kailash Nath Katju	Jaora	14 March 1957	11 March 1962	5 years, 39 days	2nd
Photographic portrait of Dwarka Prasad Mishra	Dwarka Prasad Mishra	Katangi	30 September 1963	8 March 1967	3 years, 302 days	4th
Photographic portrait of Dwarka Prasad Mishra	Dwarka Prasad Mishra	Katangi	8 March 1967	29 July 1967	3 years, 302 days	4th
Photographic portrait of Shyama Charan Shukla	Shyama Charan Shukla	Rajim	26 March 1969	28 January 1972	2 years, 308 days	4th
Photographic portrait of Shyama Charan Shukla	Shyama Charan Shukla	Rajim	23 December 1975	30 April 1977	1 year, 128 days	5th
Photographic portrait of Shyama Charan Shukla	Shyama Charan Shukla	Rajim	9 December 1989	1 March 1990	82 days	8th
	Prakash Chandra Sethi	Ujjain North	29 January 1972	22 March 1972	5 years, 39 days	5th
	Prakash Chandra Sethi	Ujjain North	23 March 1972	23 December 1975	5 years, 39 days	5th
	Arjun Singh	Churhat	9 June 1980	13 March 1985	4 years, 277 days	7th
	Arjun Singh	Kharsia	14 February 1988	23 January 1989	344 days	8th
Photographic portrait of Motilal Vora	Motilal Vora	Durg	13 March 1985	13 February 1988	2 years, 337 days	8th
Photographic portrait of Motilal Vora	Motilal Vora	Durg	25 January 1989	9 December 1989	318 days	8th
Photographic portrait of Digvijaya Singh	Digvijaya Singh	Raghogarh	7 December 1993	1 December 1998	10 years, 0 days	10th
Photographic portrait of Digvijaya Singh	Digvijaya Singh	Raghogarh	1 December 1998	7 December 2003	10 years, 0 days	11th
Photographic portrait of Kamal Nath	Kamal Nath	Chhindwara	17 December 2018	20 March 2020	1 year, 94 days	15th

== Maharashtra ==
Chief ministers of Bombay State (Note: After India's Independence, Bombay State was created and its territory underwent constant change in the following years. It comprised Bombay Presidency (roughly equating to the present-day Indian state of Maharashtra, excluding South Maharashtra and Vidarbha), the princely states of the Baroda, Western India and Gujarat (the present-day Indian state of Gujarat) and Deccan States (which included parts of the present-day Indian states of Maharashtra and Karnataka).)
Portrait	Name	Constituency	Term of office			Assembly
Photographic portrait of B. G. Kher	B. G. Kher	N/A	15 August 1947	21 April 1952	4 years, 250 days	Provincial
Photographic portrait of Morarji Desai	Morarji Desai	Chikhli	21 April 1952	31 October 1956	4 years, 193 days	1st

Chief Minister of Bombay State (after the States Reorganisation Act, 1956) (Note: States Reorganisation Act, 1956: Bombay State was enlarged by the addition of Saurashtra State and Kutch State, the Marathi-speaking districts of Nagpur Division of Madhya Pradesh and Marathwada region of Hyderabad State. The southernmost districts of the Bombay Presidency were transferred to Mysore State.)
Portrait	Name	Constituency	Term in office			Assembly
Photographic portrait of Yashwantrao Chavan	Yashwantrao Chavan	Karad North	1 November 1956	5 April 1957	3 years, 181 days	1st
Photographic portrait of Yashwantrao Chavan	Yashwantrao Chavan	Karad North	5 April 1957	30 April 1960	3 years, 181 days	2nd

Chief ministers of Maharashtra (Note: Maharashtra was formed on May 1, 1960, by the bifurcation of the Bombay state into Maharashtra for Marathi-speaking regions and Gujarat for Gujarati-speaking areas, following the Samyukta Maharashtra Movement.)
Portrait	Name	Constituency	Term of office			Assembly
Photographic portrait of Yashwantrao Chavan	Yashwantrao Chavan	Karad North	1 May 1960	19 November 1962	2 years, 202 days	1st
	Marotrao Kannamwar	Saoli	20 November 1962	24 November 1963	1 year, 4 days	2nd
	P. K. Sawant	Chiplun	25 November 1963	4 December 1963	9 days	2nd
Photographic portrait of Vasantrao Naik	Vasantrao Naik	Pusad	5 December 1963	1 March 1967	11 years, 77 days	2nd
Photographic portrait of Vasantrao Naik	Vasantrao Naik	Pusad	1 March 1967	13 March 1972	11 years, 77 days	3rd
Photographic portrait of Vasantrao Naik	Vasantrao Naik	Pusad	13 March 1972	20 February 1975	11 years, 77 days	4th
Photographic portrait of Shankarrao Chavan	Shankarrao Chavan	Bhokar	21 February 1975	16 May 1977	2 years, 84 days	4th
Photographic portrait of Shankarrao Chavan	Shankarrao Chavan	Bhokar	12 March 1986	26 June 1988	2 years, 106 days	7th
Photographic portrait of Vasantdada Patil	Vasantdada Patil	MLC	17 May 1977	5 March 1978	1 year, 62 days	4th
Photographic portrait of Vasantdada Patil	Vasantdada Patil	MLC	2 February 1983	1 June 1985	2 years, 119 days	6th
Photographic portrait of A. R. Antulay	A. R. Antulay	Shrivardhan	9 June 1980	12 January 1982	1 year, 217 days	6th
Photographic portrait of Babasaheb Bhosale	Babasaheb Bhosale	Kurla	21 January 1982	1 February 1983	1 year, 11 days	6th
	Shivajirao Patil Nilangekar	Nilanga	3 June 1985	6 March 1986	276 days	7th
Photographic portrait of Sharad Pawar	Sharad Pawar	Baramati	18 July 1978	17 February 1980	1 year, 214 days	5th
Photographic portrait of Sharad Pawar	Sharad Pawar	Baramati	26 June 1988	3 March 1991	2 years, 364 days	7th
Photographic portrait of Sharad Pawar	Sharad Pawar	Baramati	6 March 1993	14 March 1995	2 years, 8 days	8th
	Sudhakarrao Naik	Pusad	25 June 1991	22 February 1993	1 year, 242 days	8th
Photographic portrait of Vilasrao Deshmukh	Vilasrao Deshmukh	Latur City	18 October 1999	16 January 2003	3 years, 90 days	10th
Photographic portrait of Vilasrao Deshmukh	Vilasrao Deshmukh	Latur City	1 November 2004	4 December 2008	4 years, 33 days	11th
Photographic portrait of Sushilkumar Shinde	Sushilkumar Shinde	Solapur South	18 January 2003	30 October 2004	1 year, 286 days	10th
Photographic portrait of Ashok Chavan	Ashok Chavan	Bhokar	8 December 2008	15 October 2009	311 days	11th
Photographic portrait of Ashok Chavan	Ashok Chavan	Bhokar	7 November 2009	9 November 2010	1 year, 2 days	12th
Photographic portrait of Prithviraj Chavan	Prithviraj Chavan	MLC	11 November 2010	26 September 2014	3 years, 319 days	12th

== Manipur ==
Chief ministers of Manipur
Portrait	Name	Constituency	Term of office			Assembly
	Mairembam Koireng Singh	Thanga	1 July 1963	11 January 1967	3 years, 194 days	Interim
	Mairembam Koireng Singh	Thanga	20 March 1967	4 October 1967	198 days	Interim
	Mairembam Koireng Singh	Thanga	19 February 1968	16 October 1969	1 year, 239 days	Interim
	Raj Kumar Dorendra Singh	Yaiskul	6 December 1974	15 May 1977	2 years, 160 days	3rd
	Raj Kumar Dorendra Singh	Yaiskul	14 January 1980	26 November 1980	317 days	3rd
	Raj Kumar Dorendra Singh	Yaiskul	8 April 1992	10 April 1993	1 year, 2 days	6th
	Rishang Keishing	Phungyar	27 November 1980	27 February 1981	92 days	4th
	Rishang Keishing	Phungyar	19 June 1981	3 March 1988	6 years, 258 days	4th
	Rishang Keishing	Phungyar	14 December 1994	15 December 1997	3 years, 1 day	4th
	Raj Kumar Jaichandra Singh	Sagolband	4 March 1988	22 February 1990	1 year, 355 days	5th
Photographic portrait of Okram Ibobi Singh	Okram Ibobi Singh	Thoubal	7 March 2002	1 March 2007	15 years, 11 days	9th
Photographic portrait of Okram Ibobi Singh	Okram Ibobi Singh	Thoubal	2 March 2007	5 March 2012	15 years, 11 days	10th
Photographic portrait of Okram Ibobi Singh	Okram Ibobi Singh	Thoubal	6 March 2012	14 March 2017	15 years, 11 days	11th

== Meghalaya ==
Chief ministers of Meghalaya
Portrait	Name	Constituency	Term of office			Assembly
	Williamson A. Sangma	Siju	2 April 1970	18 March 1972	7 years, 335 days	Interim
	Williamson A. Sangma	Siju	18 March 1972	21 November 1976	7 years, 335 days	1st
	Williamson A. Sangma	Siju	22 November 1976	3 March 1978	7 years, 335 days	1st
Photographic portrait of P. A. Sangma	P. A. Sangma	Tura	6 February 1988	25 March 1990	2 years, 47 days	2nd
Photographic portrait of D.D. Lapang	D.D. Lapang	Nongpoh	5 February 1992	19 February 1993	1 year, 14 days	4th
Photographic portrait of D.D. Lapang	D.D. Lapang	Nongpoh	4 March 2003	15 June 2006	3 years, 103 days	7th
Photographic portrait of D.D. Lapang	D.D. Lapang	Nongpoh	10 March 2007	4 March 2008	360 days	7th
Photographic portrait of D.D. Lapang	D.D. Lapang	Nongpoh	4 March 2008	19 March 2008	15 days	8th
Photographic portrait of D.D. Lapang	D.D. Lapang	Nongpoh	13 May 2009	19 April 2010	341 days	8th
	S. C. Marak	Resubelpara	19 February 1993	27 February 1998	5 years, 19 days	5th
	S. C. Marak	Resubelpara	27 February 1998	10 March 1998	11 days	6th
Photographic portrait of J. D. Rymbai	J. D. Rymbai	Jirang	15 June 2006	10 March 2007	268 days	7th
Photographic portrait of Mukul Sangma	Mukul Sangma	Ampati	20 April 2010	5 March 2013	7 years, 320 days	8th
Photographic portrait of Mukul Sangma	Mukul Sangma	Ampati	5 March 2013	6 March 2018	7 years, 320 days	9th

== Mizoram ==
Chief Minister of Mizoram
Portrait	Name	Constituency	Term of office			Assembly
Photographic portrait of Lal Thanhawla	Lal Thanhawla	Serchhip	5 May 1984	20 August 1986	2 years, 107 days	4th
Photographic portrait of Lal Thanhawla	Lal Thanhawla	Serchhip	24 January 1989	7 December 1993	9 years, 313 days	6th
Photographic portrait of Lal Thanhawla	Lal Thanhawla	Serchhip	8 December 1993	3 December 1998	9 years, 313 days	7th
Photographic portrait of Lal Thanhawla	Lal Thanhawla	Serchhip	11 December 2008	11 December 2013	10 years, 3 days	10th
Photographic portrait of Lal Thanhawla	Lal Thanhawla	Serchhip	12 December 2013	14 December 2018	10 years, 3 days	11th

== Nagaland ==
Chief ministers of Nagaland
Portrait	Name	Constituency	Term of office			Assembly
	Hokishe Sema	Akuluto	22 February 1969	26 February 1974	5 years, 4 days	2nd
	Hokishe Sema	Akuluto	29 October 1986	7 August 1988	1 year, 283 days	5th 6th
Photographic portrait of S. C. Jamir	S. C. Jamir	Aonglenden	18 April 1980	5 June 1980	48 days	4th
Photographic portrait of S. C. Jamir	S. C. Jamir	Mokokchung Town	25 January 1989	10 May 1990	1 year, 105 days	5th
Photographic portrait of S. C. Jamir	S. C. Jamir	Aonglenden	22 February 1993	6 March 2003	10 years, 12 days	7th
	K. L. Chishi	Atoizu	16 May 1990	19 June 1990	34 days	7th

== Odisha ==
Premiers of Orissa (Note: Orissa was the official name until 2011.)
Portrait	Name	Constituency	Term of office			Assembly
Photographic portrait of Bishwanath Das	Bishwanath Das	N/A	19 July 1937	4 November 1939	2 years, 108 days	1st Pre-Independent
Photographic portrait of Harekrushna Mahatab	Harekrushna Mahatab	N/A	23 April 1946	15 August 1947	1 year, 114 days	2nd Pre-Independent (1946–1952)

Chief ministers of Odisha
Portrait	Name	Constituency	Term of office			Assembly
Photographic portrait of Harekrushna Mahatab	Harekrushna Mahatab	Soro	19 October 1956	25 February 1961	4 years, 129 days	1st
Photographic portrait of Harekrushna Mahatab	Harekrushna Mahatab	Soro	19 October 1956	25 February 1961	4 years, 129 days	2nd
Photographic portrait of Nabakrushna Choudhury	Nabakrushna Choudhury	Barchana	12 May 1950	20 February 1952	6 years, 160 days	1st
Photographic portrait of Nabakrushna Choudhury	Nabakrushna Choudhury	Barchana	20 February 1952	19 October 1956	6 years, 160 days	1st
Photographic portrait of Biju Patnaik	Biju Patnaik	Choudwar	23 June 1961	2 October 1963	2 years, 101 days	3rd
Photographic portrait of Biju Patnaik	Biju Patnaik	Bhubaneswar	5 March 1990	15 March 1995	5 years, 10 days	10th
	Biren Mitra	Cuttack City	2 October 1963	21 February 1965	1 year, 142 days	3rd
	Sadashiva Tripathy	Omerkote	21 February 1965	8 March 1967	2 years, 15 days	3rd
Photographic portrait of Nandini Satpathy	Nandini Satpathy	Cuttack	14 June 1972	3 March 1973	262 days	5th
Photographic portrait of Nandini Satpathy	Nandini Satpathy	Dhenkanal	6 March 1974	16 December 1976	2 years, 285 days	6th
	Binayak Acharya	Berhampur	29 December 1976	30 April 1977	122 days	6th
Photographic portrait of Janaki Ballabh Patnaik	Janaki Ballabh Patnaik	Athagarh	9 June 1980	10 March 1985	9 years, 181 days	8th
Photographic portrait of Janaki Ballabh Patnaik	Janaki Ballabh Patnaik	Athagarh	10 March 1985	7 December 1989	9 years, 181 days	9th
Photographic portrait of Janaki Ballabh Patnaik	Janaki Ballabh Patnaik	Athagarh	15 March 1995	17 February 1999	3 years, 339 days	11th
Photographic portrait of Hemananda Biswal	Hemananda Biswal	Laikera	7 December 1989	5 March 1990	88 days	11th
Photographic portrait of Hemananda Biswal	Hemananda Biswal	Laikera	6 December 1999	5 March 2000	90 days	11th
Photographic portrait of Hemananda Biswal	Hemananda Biswal	Laikera	15 March 1995	17 February 1999	3 years, 339 days	11th
Photographic portrait of Hemananda Biswal	Hemananda Biswal	Laikera	6 December 1999	5 March 2000	90 days	11th
Photographic portrait of Giridhar Gamang	Giridhar Gamang	Laxmipur	17 February 1999	6 December 1999	292 days	11th

== Punjab ==
Chief ministers of East Punjab
Portrait	Name	Constituency	Term of office			Assembly
Photographic portrait of Gopi Chand Bhargava	Gopi Chand Bhargava	University	15 August 1947	13 April 1949	1 year, 241 days	Interim
Photographic portrait of Gopi Chand Bhargava	Gopi Chand Bhargava	University	18 October 1949	20 June 1951	1 year, 245 days	Interim
Photographic portrait of Bhim Sen Sachar	Bhim Sen Sachar	Lahore City	13 April 1949	18 October 1949	188 days	Interim
Photographic portrait of Bhim Sen Sachar	Bhim Sen Sachar	Ludhiana City South	17 April 1952	22 July 1953	1 year, 96 days	1st
Photographic portrait of Partap Singh Kairon	Partap Singh Kairon	Sujanpur	23 January 1956	9 April 1957	1 year, 76 days	2nd
Photographic portrait of Ram Kihan	Ram Kishan	Jalandhar North East	7 July 1964	5 July 1966	1 year, 363 days	3rd

Premier of PEPSU (1948–52)
Portrait	Name	Constituency	Term in office			Assembly
Photographic portrait of Raghbir Singh	Raghbir Singh	N/A	23 May 1951	21 April 1952	334 days	Not yet created

Chief ministers of PEPSU (1952–56)
Portrait	Name	Constituency	Term of office			Assembly
Photographic portrait of Raghbir Singh	Raghbir Singh	N/A	21 April 1952	22 April 1952	1 day	1st
Photographic portrait of Raghbir Singh	Raghbir Singh	Patiala Sadar	8 March 1954	12 January 1955	310 days	2nd
Photographic portrait of Brish Bhan	Brish Bhan	Kalayat	12 January 1955	1 November 1956	1 year, 294 days	2nd

Chief ministers of Punjab (Note: Punjab was formed on November 1, 1966, through the Punjab Reorganization Act of 1966, which divided the original Punjab state into Punjab and Haryana, with some areas transferred to Himachal Pradesh.)
Portrait	Name	Constituency	Term of office			Assembly
Photographic portrait of Giani Gurmukh Singh Musafir	Giani Gurmukh Singh Musafir	MLC	1 November 1966	8 March 1967	127 days	3rd
Photographic portrait of Zail Singh	Zail Singh	Anandpur Sahib	17 March 1972	30 April 1977	5 years, 44 days	6th
Photographic portrait of Darbara Singh	Darbara Singh	Nakodar	6 June 1980	6 October 1983	3 years, 122 days	8th
Photographic portrait of Beant Singh	Beant Singh	Jalandhar Cantonment	25 February 1992	31 August 1995	3 years, 187 days	10th
Photographic portrait of Harcharan Singh Brar	Harcharan Singh Brar	Muktsar	31 August 1995	21 November 1996	1 year, 82 days	10th
Photographic portrait of Rajinder Kaur Bhattal	Rajinder Kaur Bhattal	Lehra	21 November 1996	11 February 1997	82 days	10th
Photographic portrait of Amarinder Singh	Amarinder Singh	Patiala Urban	26 February 2002	1 March 2007	5 years, 3 days	12th
Photographic portrait of Amarinder Singh	Amarinder Singh	Patiala Urban	16 March 2017	20 September 2021	4 years, 188 days	15th
Photographic portrait of Charanjit Singh Channi	Charanjit Singh Channi	Chamkaur Sahib	20 September 2021	16 March 2022	177 days	15th

== Puducherry ==
Chief ministers of Puducherry
Portrait	Name	Constituency	Term of office			Assembly
	Edouard Goubert	Mannadipet	1 July 1963	24 August 1964	1 year, 54 days	1st
Photographic portrait of V. Venkatasubha Reddiar	V. Venkatasubha Reddiar	Nettapacom	11 September 1964	9 April 1967	2 years, 210 days	2nd
Photographic portrait of V. Venkatasubha Reddiar	V. Venkatasubha Reddiar	Nettapacom	6 March 1968	18 September 1968	196 days	2nd
Photographic portrait of M. O. H. Farook	M. O. H. Farook	Karaikal North	9 April 1967	6 March 1968	332 days	2nd
Photographic portrait of M. O. H. Farook	M. O. H. Farook	Calapeth	17 March 1969	3 January 1974	4 years, 292 days	3rd
Photographic portrait of M. O. H. Farook	M. O. H. Farook	Lawspet	16 March 1985	4 March 1990	4 years, 353 days	7th
Photographic portrait of V. Vaithilingam	V. Vaithilingam	Nettapakkam	4 July 1991	13 May 1996	4 years, 314 days	9th
Photographic portrait of V. Vaithilingam	V. Vaithilingam	Nettapakkam	4 September 2008	16 May 2011	2 years, 254 days	12th
	P. Shanmugam	Yanam	22 March 2000	15 May 2001	1 year, 218 days	10th
	P. Shanmugam	Yanam	24 May 2001	26 October 2001	1 year, 218 days	11th
Photographic portrait of N. Rangaswamy	N. Rangaswamy (Note: later served under N. R. Congress)	Thattanchavady	27 October 2001	12 May 2006	6 years, 313 days	11th
Photographic portrait of N. Rangaswamy	N. Rangaswamy	Thattanchavady	13 May 2006	4 September 2008	6 years, 313 days	12th
Photographic portrait of V. Narayanasamy	V. Narayanasamy	Nellithope	6 June 2016	22 February 2021	4 years, 261 days	14th

== Rajasthan ==
Chief Minister of Ajmer State
Portrait	Name	Constituency	Term in office			Assembly
Photographic portrait of Haribhau Upadhyaya	Haribhau Upadhyaya	N/A	24 March 1952	31 October 1956	4 years, 221 days	1st

Chief ministers of Rajasthan (Note: Rajasthan was formed on November 1, 1956, through the States Reorganization Act of 1956, by merging the princely states of Rajputana with Ajmer-Merwara.)
Portrait	Name	Constituency	Term of office			Assembly
Photographic portrait of Heera Lal Shastri	Heera Lal Shastri	N/A	7 April 1949	5 January 1951	1 year, 273 days	N/A
	C. S. Venkatachari	N/A	6 January 1951	25 April 1951	109 days	N/A
Photographic portrait of Jai Narayan Vyas	Jai Narayan Vyas	N/A	26 April 1951	3 March 1952	312 days	N/A
Photographic portrait of Jai Narayan Vyas	Jai Narayan Vyas	Kishangarh	1 November 1952	12 November 1954	2 years, 11 days	1st
	Tika Ram Paliwal	Mahuwa	3 March 1952	31 October 1952	242 days	1st
Photographic portrait of Mohan Lal Sukhadia	Mohan Lal Sukhadia	Udaipur	13 November 1954	1 April 1957	2 years, 139 days	2nd
Photographic portrait of Mohan Lal Sukhadia	Mohan Lal Sukhadia	Udaipur	11 April 1957	11 March 1962	4 years, 334 days	3rd
Photographic portrait of Mohan Lal Sukhadia	Mohan Lal Sukhadia	Udaipur	12 March 1962	13 March 1967	5 years, 1 day	4th
Photographic portrait of Mohan Lal Sukhadia	Mohan Lal Sukhadia	Udaipur	26 April 1967	9 July 1971	4 years, 74 days	5th
	Barkatullah Khan	Tijara	9 July 1971	11 August 1973	2 years, 33 days	5th
	Hari Dev Joshi	Banswara	11 August 1973	29 April 1977	3 years, 261 days	5th
	Hari Dev Joshi	Banswara	10 March 1985	20 January 1988	2 years, 316 days	8th
	Hari Dev Joshi	Banswara	4 December 1989	4 March 1990	90 days	8th
Photographic portrait of Jagannath Pahadia	Jagannath Pahadia	Weir	6 June 1980	13 July 1981	1 year, 37 days	7th
Photographic portrait of Shiv Charan Mathur	Shiv Charan Mathur	Mandalgarh	14 July 1981	23 February 1985	3 years, 224 days	7th
Photographic portrait of Shiv Charan Mathur	Shiv Charan Mathur	Mandalgarh	20 January 1988	4 December 1989	1 year, 318 days	8th
	Hira Lal Devpura	Kumbhalgarh	23 February 1985	10 March 1985	15 days	7th
Photographic portrait of Ashok Gehlot	Ashok Gehlot	Sardarpura	1 December 1998	8 December 2003	5 years, 7 days	15th
Photographic portrait of Ashok Gehlot	Ashok Gehlot	Sardarpura	12 December 2008	13 December 2013	5 years, 1 day	15th
Photographic portrait of Ashok Gehlot	Ashok Gehlot	Sardarpura	17 December 2018	15 December 2023	4 years, 363 days	15th

== Sikkim ==
Chief ministers of Sikkim
Portrait	Name	Constituency	Term of office			Assembly
Photographic portrait of Kazi Lhendup Dorjee	Kazi Lhendup Dorjee	Tashiding	16 May 1975	17 August 1979	4 years, 93 days	1st
	B. B. Gurung	Jorthang-Nayabazar	11 May 1984	25 May 1984	14 days	2nd

== Tamil Nadu ==
Chief Ministers of the Madras Presidency
Portrait	Name (Birth–Death)	Elected constituency	Term of office			Assembly (Election)
Portrait	Name (Birth–Death)	Elected constituency	Assumed office	Left office	Time in office	Assembly (Election)
	C. Rajagopalachari (1878–1972)	Member of the Legislative Council	14 July 1937	29 October 1939	2 years, 107 days	1st (1937)
	T. Prakasam (1872–1957)	Member of the Legislative Council	30 April 1946	23 March 1947	327 days	2nd (1946)
	Omanthur P. Ramaswamy Reddiar (1895–1970)	Member of the Legislative Council	23 March 1947	6 April 1949	2 years, 14 days	2nd (1946)
	P. S. Kumaraswamy Raja (1898–1957)	Member of the Legislative Council	6 April 1949	25 January 1950	294 days	2nd (1946)
Chief Ministers of Madras State
	P. S. Kumaraswamy Raja (1898–1957)	Member of the Legislative Council	26 January 1950	9 April 1952	2 years, 74 days	2nd (1946)
	C. Rajagopalachari (1878–1972)	Member of the Legislative Council	10 April 1952	13 April 1954^{[RES]}	2 years, 3 days	1st (1952)
	K. Kamaraj (1903–1975)	Gudiyatham	13 April 1954	12 April 1957	9 years, 172 days	1st (1952)
	K. Kamaraj (1903–1975)	Sattur	13 April 1957	14 March 1962	9 years, 172 days	2nd (1957)
	K. Kamaraj (1903–1975)	Sattur	15 March 1962	2 October 1963	9 years, 172 days	3rd (1962)
	M. Bhakthavatsalam (1897–1987)	Sriperumbudur	2 October 1963	5 March 1967	3 years, 154 days	3rd (1962)

== Telangana ==
Chief Minister of Hyderabad State
Portrait	Name	Constituency	Term in office			Assembly
Dr. Burgula Ramakrishna Rao (1899–1967) was the first elected chief minister of erstwhile Hyderabad State and a leader of the Freedom Movement in the state	Burgula Ramakrishna Rao	N/A	6 March 1952	31 October 1956	4 years, 239 days	1st
Chief Minister of Telangana
	Anumula Revanth Reddy* (b. 1969)	Kodangal	7 December 2023	Incumbent	2 years, 292 days	3rd (2023)

Key

- * – Incumbent chief minister

== Tripura ==
Chief ministers of Tripura
Portrait	Name	Constituency	Term of office			Assembly
	Sachindra Lal Singh	Agartala Sadar II	1 July 1963	1 November 1971	8 years, 123 days	1st
	Sukhamoy Sen Gupta	Agartala Town III	20 March 1972	31 March 1977	5 years, 11 days	3rd
	Sudhir Ranjan Majumdar	Town Bordowali	5 February 1988	19 February 1992	4 years, 14 days	6th
	Samir Ranjan Barman	Bishalgarh	19 February 1992	10 March 1993	1 year, 19 days	6th

== Uttar Pradesh ==
Premier of United Provinces (1937–50)
Portrait	Name	Constituency	Term of office			Assembly
Photographic portrait of Govind Ballabh Pant	Govind Ballabh Pant	N/A	17 July 1937	2 November 1939	2 years, 108 days	1st provincial
Photographic portrait of Govind Ballabh Pant	Govind Ballabh Pant	N/A	1 April 1946	25 January 1950	3 years, 299 days	2nd provincial

Chief ministers of Uttar Pradesh (Note: On January 24, 1950, the United Provinces was officially renamed as Uttar Pradesh by the Government of India.)
Portrait	Name	Constituency	Term of office			Assembly
Photographic portrait of Govind Ballabh Pant	Govind Ballabh Pant	Bareilly Municipality	26 January 1950	20 May 1952	4 years, 335 days	2nd provincial
Photographic portrait of Govind Ballabh Pant	Govind Ballabh Pant	Bareilly Municipality	20 May 1952	27 December 1954	4 years, 335 days	1st
Photographic portrait of Sampurnanand	Sampurnanand	Varanasi South	28 December 1954	9 April 1957	5 years, 344 days	2nd
Photographic portrait of Sampurnanand	Sampurnanand	Varanasi South	10 April 1957	6 December 1960	5 years, 344 days	2nd
	Chandra Bhanu Gupta	Ranikhet South	7 December 1960	14 March 1962	2 years, 298 days	3rd
	Chandra Bhanu Gupta	Ranikhet South	14 March 1962	1 October 1963	2 years, 298 days	3rd
	Chandra Bhanu Gupta	Ranikhet	14 March 1967	2 April 1967	19 days	4th
	Chandra Bhanu Gupta	Ranikhet	26 February 1969	17 February 1970	356 days	4th
Photographic portrait of Sucheta Kripalani	Sucheta Kripalani	Menhdawal	2 October 1963	13 March 1967	3 years, 162 days	3rd
	Kamalapati Tripathi	Chandauli	4 April 1971	12 June 1973	2 years, 69 days	5th
Photographic portrait of Hemwati Nandan Bahuguna	Hemwati Nandan Bahuguna	Bara	8 November 1973	4 March 1974	2 years, 21 days	5th
Photographic portrait of Hemwati Nandan Bahuguna	Hemwati Nandan Bahuguna	Bara	5 March 1974	29 November 1975	2 years, 21 days	6th
Photographic portrait of Narayan Dutt Tiwari	Narayan Datt Tiwari	Kashipur	21 January 1976	30 April 1977	1 year, 99 days	6th
Photographic portrait of Narayan Dutt Tiwari	Narayan Datt Tiwari	Kashipur	3 August 1984	10 March 1985	1 year, 52 days	8th
Photographic portrait of Narayan Dutt Tiwari	Narayan Datt Tiwari	Kashipur	11 March 1985	24 September 1985	1 year, 52 days	9th
Photographic portrait of Narayan Dutt Tiwari	Narayan Datt Tiwari	Kashipur	25 June 1988	5 December 1989	1 year, 163 days	9th
Photographic portrait of Vishwanath Pratap Singh	Vishwanath Pratap Singh	Tindwari	9 June 1980	18 July 1982	2 years, 39 days	8th
	Sripati Mishra	Isauli	19 July 1982	2 August 1984	2 years, 14 days	8th
	Vir Bahadur Singh	Paniyara	24 September 1985	24 June 1988	2 years, 274 days	9th

== Uttarakhand ==
Chief ministers of Uttarakhand
Portrait	Name	Constituency	Term of office			Assembly
Photographic portrait of Narayan Datt Tiwari	Narayan Datt Tiwari	Ramnagar	2 March 2002	7 March 2007	5 years, 5 days	1st
Photographic portrait of Vijay Bahuguna	Vijay Bahuguna	Dhumakot	13 March 2012	31 January 2014	1 year, 324 days	3rd
Photographic portrait of Harish Rawat	Harish Rawat	Dharchula	1 February 2014	27 March 2016	2 years, 55 days	3rd
Photographic portrait of Harish Rawat	Harish Rawat	Dharchula	21 April 2016	22 April 2016	1 day	3rd
Photographic portrait of Harish Rawat	Harish Rawat	Dharchula	11 May 2016	18 March 2017	311 days	3rd

== West Bengal ==
Prime ministers of West Bengal (Note: While the Assembly website calls the pre-1950 officeholders "premiers of West Bengal", The Times of India points out that they were universally referred to as "prime ministers of West Bengal" at the time.)
Portrait	Name	Constituency	Term of office			Assembly
Photographic portrait of Prafulla Chandra Ghosh	Prafulla Chandra Ghosh	Appointed by Governor	15 August 1947	22 January 1948	160 days	Provincial (Note: This refers to the 90-member rump legislature that emerged following partition, representing the West Bengali constituencies of the erstwhile Bengal Legislative Assembly. It was constituted under the Government of India Act 1935, not the Indian Constitution, which was still in the process of being drafted.)
Photographic portrait of Bidhan Chandra Roy	Bidhan Chandra Roy	Appointed by Governor	23 January 1948	25 January 1950	2 years, 2 days	Provincial

Chief ministers of West Bengal
Portrait	Name	Constituency	Term of office			Assembly
Photographic portrait of Bidhan Chandra Roy	Bidhan Chandra Roy	N/A	26 January 1950	30 March 1952	12 years, 156 days	Provincial (Note: Following the promulgation of the Constitution of India, the provincial assembly carried on as the legislative assembly of West Bengal until fresh elections could be organised in 1952.)
Photographic portrait of Bidhan Chandra Roy	Bidhan Chandra Roy	Bowbazar (Note: Until March 1952, Roy did not represent any constituency. For his last three months in office, during the Third Assembly, Roy represented Chowringhee constituency.)	31 March 1952	5 April 1957	12 years, 156 days	1st
Photographic portrait of Bidhan Chandra Roy	Bidhan Chandra Roy	Bowbazar	6 April 1957	2 April 1962	12 years, 156 days	2nd
Photographic portrait of Bidhan Chandra Roy	Bidhan Chandra Roy	Chowrangee	3 April 1962	1 July 1962	12 years, 156 days	3rd
Photographic portrait of Prafulla Chandra Sen	Prafulla Chandra Sen (Note: According to some sources, Sen also acted as interim chief minister during 2–8 July 1962.)	Arambagh East	9 July 1962	28 February 1967	4 years, 234 days	3rd
Photographic portrait of Ajoy Kumar Mukherjee	Ajoy Kumar Mukherjee	Tamluk	2 April 1971	28 June 1971	87 days	6th
Photographic portrait of Siddhartha Shankar Ray	Siddhartha Shankar Ray	Malda	20 March 1972	30 April 1977	5 years, 41 days	7th

== See also ==
- List of presidents of the Indian National Congress
- List of state presidents of the Indian National Congress
- Indian National Congress
