= Shyam Sunder Patidar =

Indian politician

Member of the Madhya Pradesh Legislative Assembly for Mandsaur Vidhan Sabha
- In office 1952–Unknown

Shyam Sunder Patidar was an Indian politician from the state of the Madhya Pradesh. He represented Mandsaur Vidhan Sabha constituency in Madhya Pradesh Legislative Assembly by winning General election of 1952, 1957, 1962, 1972, 1980 and 1985.
