= Bhojpur, Madhya Pradesh Assembly constituency =

Constituency of the Madhya Pradesh legislative assembly in India

Coordinates: 25.5562°N 84.6653°E

Bhojpur
- Constituency No. 141 for the Madhya Pradesh Legislative Assembly

Constituency details
- Country: India
- Region: Central India
- State: Madhya Pradesh
- District: Raisen
- Lok Sabha constituency: Vidisha
- Established: 1967
- Reservation: None

Member of Legislative Assembly
- 16th Madhya Pradesh Legislative Assembly
- Incumbent Surendra Patwa
- Party: Bharatiya Janata Party
- Elected year: 2023
- Preceded by: Rajesh Patel

Bhojpur Assembly constituency is one of the seats in Madhya Pradesh Legislative Assembly in India. Bhojpur Vidhan Sabha seat is a segment of Vidisha Lok Sabha constituency.

== Members of Legislative Assembly ==
Election	Name	Party
1967	Gulabchand	Indian National Congress
1972-1977: Constituency did not exist
1977	Parab Chand Lakhmichand	Janata Party
1980	Shaligram	Bharatiya Janata Party
1985	Sunder Lal Patwa	Bharatiya Janata Party
1990	Sunder Lal Patwa	Bharatiya Janata Party
1993	Sunder Lal Patwa	Bharatiya Janata Party
1997^	Ram Kishan Chouhan	Bharatiya Janata Party
1998	Sunder Lal Patwa	Bharatiya Janata Party
1999^	Naresh Singh Patel	Bharatiya Janata Party
2003	Rajesh Patel	Indian National Congress
2008	Surendra Patwa	Bharatiya Janata Party
2013	Surendra Patwa	Bharatiya Janata Party
2018	Surendra Patwa	Bharatiya Janata Party
2023	Surendra Patwa	Bharatiya Janata Party

== Election results ==
=== 2023 ===
2023 Madhya Pradesh Legislative Assembly election: Bhojpur
Party	Candidate	Votes	%	±%
BJP	Surendra Patwa	119,289	58.2	+5.39
INC	Rajkumar Patel	78,510	38.3	+2.33
Gana Suraksha Party	Kamlesh Uike	1,994	0.97	
NOTA	None of the above	1,724	0.84	−0.22
Majority		40,779	19.9	+3.06
Turnout		204,965	80.16	+1.85
BJP hold		Swing		

=== 2018 ===
2018 Madhya Pradesh Legislative Assembly election: Bhojpur
Party	Candidate	Votes	%	±%
BJP	Surendra Patwa	92,458	52.81	
INC	Suresh Pachouri	62,972	35.97	
GGP	Ravi Dhurvey	10,772	6.15	
BSP	Pohap Singh Choudhry	1,642	0.94	
NOTA	None of the above	1,848	1.06	
Majority		29,486	16.84	
Turnout		175,090	78.31	
BJP hold		Swing		

=== 1980 ===
- Shaligram (BJP) : 23,764 votes
- Aslam Sher Khan (INC-I) : 13,464

== See also ==
- Raisen
- Vidisha (Lok Sabha constituency)
