= Dhumakot Assembly constituency =

Former constituency of the Uttarakhand legislative assembly in India

Coordinates: 29.75°N 79.01°E

Dhumakot
- Former constituency for the Uttarakhand Legislative Assembly

Constituency details
- Country: India
- Region: North India
- State: Uttarakhand
- District: Pauri Garhwal
- Established: 2002
- Abolished: 2012

Dhumakot Legislative Assembly constituency was one of the seventy electoral Uttarakhand Legislative Assembly constituencies of Uttarakhand state in India. It was abolished in 2012 following the delimitation.

Dhumakot Legislative Assembly constituency was a part of Garhwal (Lok Sabha constituency).

== Members of Legislative Assembly ==
Election	Member	Party
2002	Tejpal Singh Rawat	Indian National Congress
2007	Tejpal Singh Rawat	Indian National Congress
2007 By-election	B. C. Khanduri	Bharatiya Janata Party

== Election results ==
=== Assembly By-election 2007 ===
2007 Uttarakhand Legislative Assembly by-election: Dhumakot
Party	Candidate	Votes	%	±%
BJP	B. C. Khanduri	22,708	70.76%	▲30.16
INC	Surendra Singh Negi	8,537	26.60%	▼18.81
Independent	Manish Sundriyal	848	2.64%	New
Margin of victory		14,171	44.16%	▲39.35
Turnout		32,093	59.79%	▲4.77
Registered electors		53,986		▼6.40
BJP gain from INC		Swing	▲25.35	

=== Assembly Election 2007 ===
2007 Uttarakhand Legislative Assembly election: Dhumakot
Party	Candidate	Votes	%	±%
INC	Tejpal Singh Rawat	14,319	45.41%	▲11.76
BJP	Khushal Mani	12,803	40.60%	▲10.81
UKD	Anand Prakash	1,362	4.32%	▲2.12
BSP	Dhananjai	768	2.44%	▲0.42
BJSH	Devendra Bharti	756	2.40%	New
Independent	Manish Sundriyal	518	1.64%	New
Vishwa Vikas Sangh	Devendra Pal Singh Rawat	403	1.28%	New
SP	Anil Chaturvedi	384	1.22%	▼0.79
Independent	Aditya Ram Joshi	222	0.70%	New
Margin of victory		1,516	4.81%	▲0.95
Turnout		31,535	54.89%	▲7.16
Registered electors		57,677		▲4.42
INC hold		Swing	▲11.76	

=== Assembly Election 2002 ===
2002 Uttaranchal Legislative Assembly election: Dhumakot
Party	Candidate	Votes	%	±%
INC	Tejpal Singh Rawat	8,830	33.65%	New
BJP	Khushal Mani Ghildiyal	7,818	29.79%	New
Independent	Virendra Singh	2,728	10.39%	New
Independent	Dinesh Chandra Balodhi	2,713	10.34%	New
Independent	Sudershan Singh Alias Roshan Singh	1,227	4.68%	New
UKD	Anand Prakash Juyal	576	2.19%	New
BSP	Bhawan Singh	530	2.02%	New
SP	Puran Singh Rawat	527	2.01%	New
Independent	Prem Singh Gusain	479	1.83%	New
Independent	Yogendra Singh Rawat	412	1.57%	New
Independent	Dr. Devendra Pal Singh Rawat	404	1.54%	New
Margin of victory		1,012	3.86%	
Turnout		26,244	47.73%	
Registered electors		55,238		
INC win (new seat)				
