= Datia State =

Princely state of India

Coordinates: 25°41′N 78°28′E

- Princely state of British India
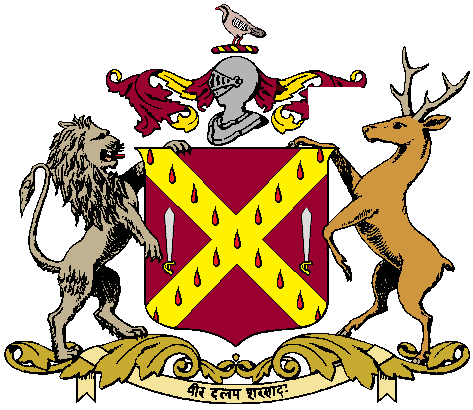
- Coat of arms

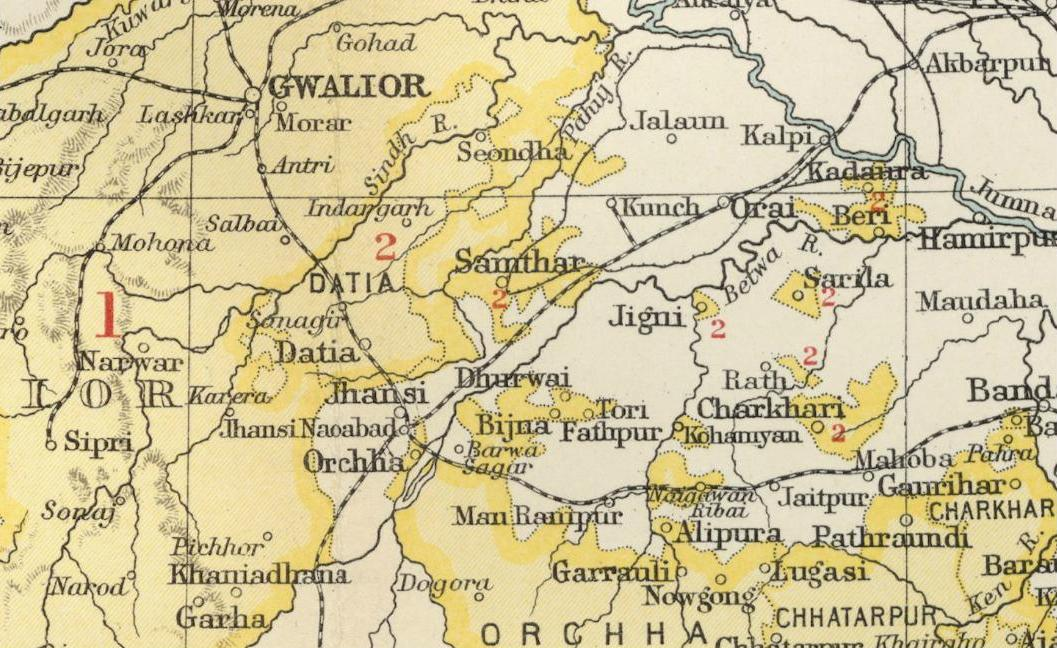
- Map of Datia and the surrounding princely states of the Bundelkhand Agency
- General view of Datia in the 1880s
- Area
  - 1891: 5,500 km^{2} (2,100 sq mi)
- Population
  - 1891: 186,440
- Government
  - Type: Absolute Monarchy
- Ruler
  - 1626–1656: Rao Bhagwan Rao (first)
  - 1907–1948: Govind Singh (last)
- History
  - Established: 1626
  - Joined Vindhya Pradesh: 4 April 1948
  - Accession to the Union of India: 1 January 1950
  - Merged into Madhya Pradesh: 1 November 1956
| Succeeded by |
| India |
- Today part of: India

The palace of Bir Singh Deo at Datia, photographed by Martin Hürlimann, c. 1928

Datia State was a princely state in subsidiary alliance with British india. A branch of the Bundela rajputs ruled it from 1626 to 1950. The rulers of Datia ranked second among the Bundela chiefs, after Orchha. They bore the titles of Maharaja and were entitled to a hereditary 15 gun salute.

Datia layed in the extreme northwest of Bundelkhand, near Gwalior, other central indian states surrounded it on every side except the east, where it met the United Provinces, It was administered as part of the Bundelkhand Agency of Central India Agency.

Datia was one of the only three in Bundelkhand, with Orchha and Samthar, whose relations with the British rested on treaty rather than grant. The state maintained its own army, coinage and postal service. After Indian independence it acceded to the Dominion of India and was merged into Vindhya Pradesh, and its territory now forms Datia district of Madhya Pradesh.

== Geography ==
Boundaries: The territory was not compact; enclaves belonging to Gwalior and other states broke it up. It was bounded on the north by Gwalior and Jalaun, on the south by Gwalior and Jhansi, on the east by Samthar and Jhansi, and on the west by Gwalior.

Rivers and geology: The state occupied a level plain between the Sind and Betwa rivers. The only rivers of importance were the Sind and its tributary the Pahuj. The underlying rock was mostly gneiss, typical of Bundelkhand. A small gneiss ridge at Sonagir, about five miles from Datia town, is crowned by more than a hundred Jain temples.

Jain Temples at Sonagiri, Madhya Pradesh, India (1872 Engraving)

== Pre-Colonial Era ==
Foundation

Datia had been part of the Orchha Kingdom. In 1626 Vir Singh Deo, the ruler of Orchha and close ally of the Mughal Emperor Jahangir, granted the territory of Datia and Baroni to his son Bhagwan Rao. The original grant was later considerably enlarged, both by conquest and by grants from the Mughal emperors, at its peak, the princely state of Datia encompassed most of the country bounded by the Chambal river to the north, and the Betwa and Sindh river to the east and west.

Mughal Period

Bhagwan Rao died in 1656 and was succeeded by his son, Subha Karan, who had served with distinction in the Mughal campaigns in Balkh and Badakhshan (1646-1653) and later, during the war of succession among Shah Jahan sons, he sided with the future Emperor Aurangzeb. He died in 1683.

His successor Rao Dalpat Rao was one of Aurangzeb's trusted commanders in the Deccan. He played a key part in the 1698 capture of Jinji fort and was one of the commanders at the Siege of Wagingera. After Aurangzeb's death in 1707. Dalpat Rao supported Prince Muhammad Shah in the subsequent war of succession. He was ultimately killed at the Battle of Jajau in June 1707. Rao Ram Chandra then ruled until 1733.

Bundela Disputes and Maratha Period

Rao Indrajit Singh of Datia (r. 1732–1762) celebrating Jhulan Yatra, Bundelkhand, c. 1750

When Ram Chandra died in 1733 there was a fight on who should be the next ruler. The matter was taken to the Raja of Orchha, who decided in favor of Rao Indrajit, a great grandson of Ram Chandra. A local Gujar leader named Naune Sah also supported Indrajit; his son Madan Singh was later given the fort of Samthar and the title of Rajdhar. Madan's family later became rulers of Samthar State.

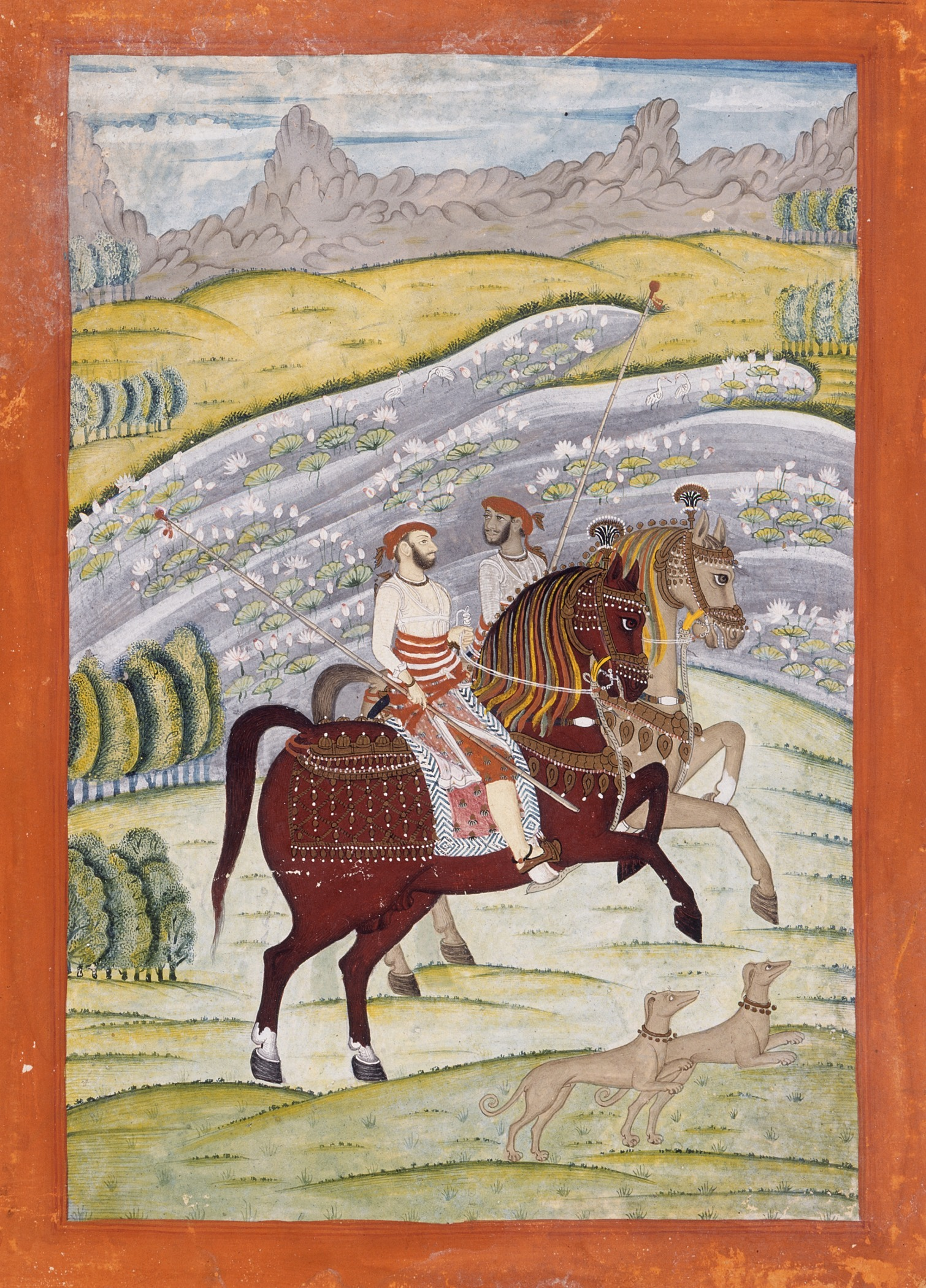
Rao Shatrujit Singh of Datia (r. 1762–1801) hunting on his stallion named Hayaraja, meaning "king of horses"

Rao Indrajit Singh was succeeded by Rao Shatrujit in 1762. Following Shatrujit's accession Datia faced immense military pressure from expanding Maratha Empire, leading Shatrujit to intervene in regional conflicts until he was killed defending his allies at the Battle of Seondha in 1801.

== Colonial Era to Integration ==
British Suzerainty

In 1801 Rao Parichhat Singh became ruler. After the British defeated the Marathas in the Second Anglo-Maratha War. Parichhat signed a treaty of alliance and protection with the East India Company in 1804. Datia was one of the only three Bundelkhand states (along with Orchha and Samthar) that had a full treaty with the British. In 1818 the British gave Rao Parichhat a extra territory including the (fort of Indargarh) as a reward for helping keep order. In 1820, the ruler of Datia was recognized with the hereditary title of Raja. Raja Parichhat Bahadur Singh had no son, so in 1826 he adopted a boy named Bijai Bahadur Singh. Some local nobles (the Thakurs of Baroni) opposed this, but the British supported the adoption.

Bijai Bahadur Singh succeeded Parichhat Singh as Raja and ruled Datia from 1839 until his death in 1857. Because he left no legitimate heir, he was succeeded by Bhawani Singh, an eleven year old boy of Bhasnai family. There was a short rebellion by a rival claimant but it was put down.

The succession happened at the same time as the Indian Rebellion of 1857. Following the rebellion, the British upheld Bhawani Singh's succession, and in 1869 Datia was granted a hereditary 15 gun salute and the formal, elevated hereditary title of Maharaja for its rulers in 1865, while also receiving absolute protection from Imperial expansion. Under the Company's aggressive Doctrine of Lapse.

Reign of Maharaja Bhawani Singh (1857–1907)

During the early year of Maharaja Bhawani Singh's reign, the state was administered by a regency of the late Raja's widows. The senior Rani acted as regent until her death in 1858 and the second Rani then succeeded her. Datia was later placed under British superintendence for the rest of the minority. The factional rivalries re-emerged once Bhawani Singh assumed power. In 1870-71 the Political Agent, Dr. Stratton, visited Datia to restore order. He reported that the Maharaja's ministers had little real authority and that the administration lacked system. By the reforms of the superintendence largely lasped. The state's debt equalled a year's revenue, and salaries were in arrears.

Several Dewans held office in the following years, Rao Bahadur Piareyjoo, a Thakur and near relative of the Maharaja, died in 1875–76. He was aware of the decline in the state's administration and regretted it, but in his later years, his authority had become largely nominal. He was succeeded by Dewan Munnu Lal, who manged the finances cautiously but was unable to reduce the states's debt. He fell ill for several months in 1877–78 and died in office in 1878.

The Maharaja then appointed his personal priest, the Gosain Garibdas, as Dewan. He was excellent with money and made sure the state did not spend more than it earned. He also paid off old debts that the state had been struggling with for many years. Garibdas ran the government in a highly autocratic manner. He concentrated all the power to himself and fiercely guarded access to the Maharaja, while British officials frequently criticized his old-fashioned methods and warned that his refusal to delegate power risked administrative inefficiency, his total control kept the state peaceful and free of public complaints. Das ruled for thirteen years until his death in December 1891, when he was smoothly succeeded by his trained assistant, Janki Pershad.

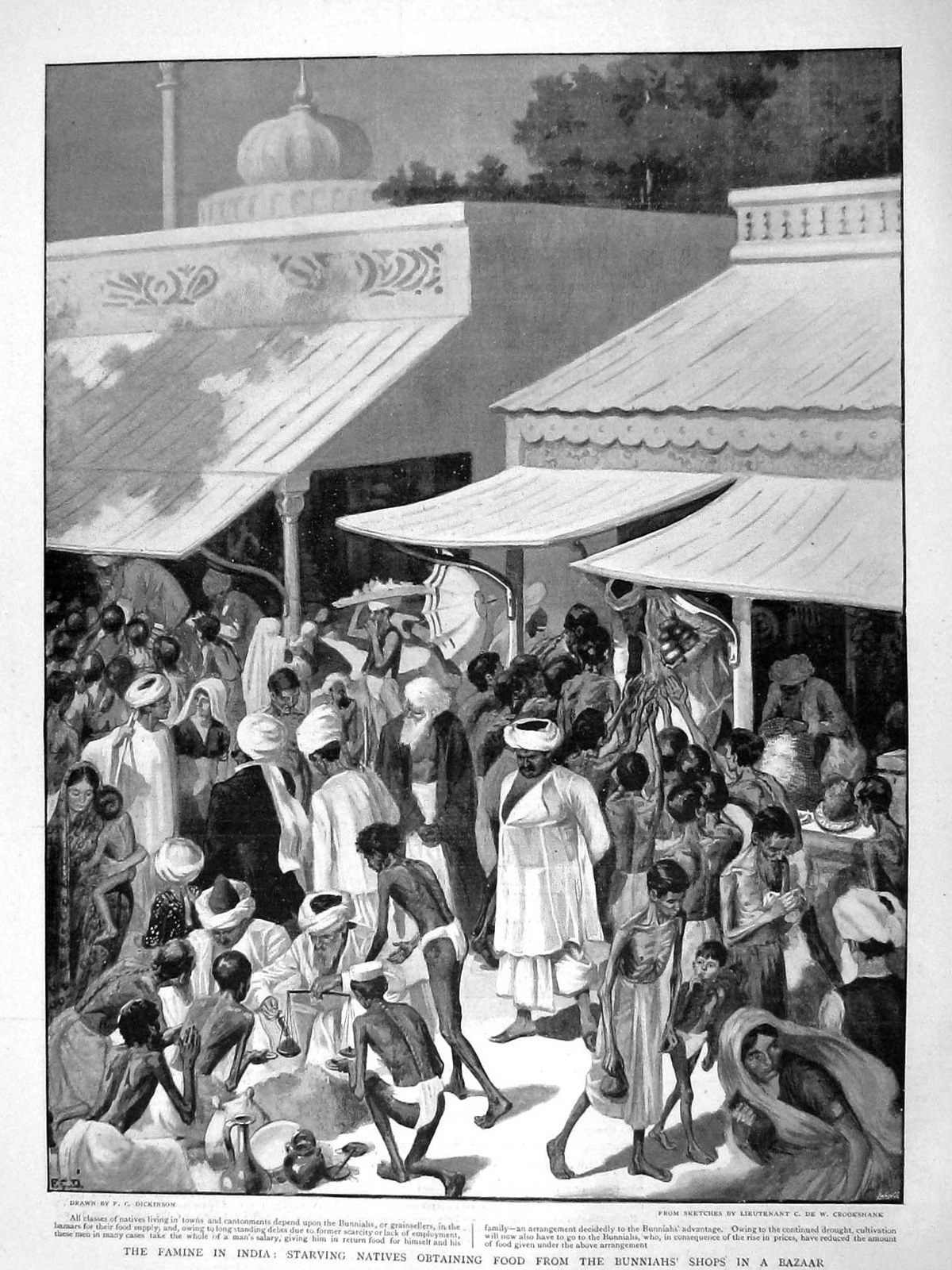
Villagers buying grain during the Indian famine of 1896–1897, from The Graphic, 1897

In the following years, Datia faced the severe famine of 1897. The state had previously experienced periods of famine or scarcity in 1812 and 1837 but the famine of 1897 was the most serious in its recorded history and affected the entire population. It formed a part of a wider famine in Bundelkhand. The Political Agent advised the chiefs to prepare for scarcity and visited Datia in November 1896. Grain was available within the state, but distributing it to those in need proved difficult. The Durbar opened relief works and provided charitable relief to the destitute, at a total cost of about Rs. 7 lakh. Forests were opened so that villagers could collect firewood and grass free of charge, and forest dues were reduced.

In the New Year Honours of January 1898 Maharaja Bhawani Singh was appointed a Knight Commander (K.C.I.E) in recognition of his management of the famine, and his Diwan, Janki Pershad, received the title of Rao Bahadur. In the New Year Honours of January 1906, he was granted an addition of two guns to his salute as a personal distinction, raising it from Datia's hereditary 15 guns to 17. Maharaja Bhawani Singh died in 1907, in his sixty-second year, after a reign of nearly fifty years.

Reign of Maharaja Govind Singh (1907–1948)

Maharaja Govind Singh, born in 1886, succeeded his father in 1907 at the age of about twenty-one. The Diwan's post, vacant since the death of Rao Bahadur Janki Pershad, was given to Rai Bahadur Maharaj Narain Sheopuri. The administration deteriorated in the early years of the reign of Govind Singh. On 19 November 1911 the Government of India deprived Govind Singh of his ruling powers. However after a period of administrative training at Ajmer, Govind Singh was allowed to return to Datia on 31 July 1914. Govind Singh was created a Knight Commander of the Order of the Star of India (K.C.I.E) in 1918. He was raised to Knight Grand Commander of the Order of the Indian Empire (G.C.I.E) in 1932.

In 1943 the Political Department of the Government of India appointed Khan Bahadur Sayed Ainuddin as Dewan of Datia. The Maharaja, Govind Singh, protested against the appointment, later describing the Dewan as having been "thrust on" him. Because the Political Department had made the appointment, the Maharaja could not remove Ainuddin without its consent. Ainuddin's administration soon became the target of public opposition, which grew over the following three years. His critics, led by the Datia Rajya Praja Mandal, accused him of opposing the movement for responsible government and of encouraging communal division. He was said to have helped establish a state branch of the Muslim League and a Scheduled Caste Federation. His opponents saw these as attempts to divide support for the Praja Mandal.

In November 1946, in line with public opinion, the Maharaja removed Ainuddin from office. The Resident for the Central India States, Sir Walter Campbell intervened to reinstate him, on the grounds that the Maharaja had acted without the Resident's consent. He reportedly threatened to deprive the ruler of his powers. The Resident's intervention turned a local dispute into a state-wide protest. A general strike (hartal) was declared. Markets and schools closed, and a large number of state employees resigned. On 12 November government employees struck again, closing government and municipal offices and the courts. In mid-November about 5,000 women of Datia reportedly threatened to leave the state for British India unless Ainuddin was removed. Local leaders appealed to Jawaharlal Nehru, who wrote to the Political Department asking why a Dewan was being forced on Datia against the wishes of both its ruler and its people. The British at last gave way. On 4 December 1946 Dewan Ainuddin was dismissed.

Accession to Union of India

Following Indian independence in August 1947, Maharaja Govind Singh acceded to the Dominion of India. Through the efforts of Sardar Vallabhbhai Patel, Datia was then merged with the other princely states of Bundelkhand and Baghelkhand to form the United States of Vindhya Pradesh, which was inaugurated on 4 April 1948. In 1956, Vindhya Pradesh state was merged with certain other areas to form the state of Madhya Pradesh within the Union of India.

== Rulers ==
=== Raos ===
The following rulers carried the title "Rao":

- 1626 - 1656: Rao Bhagwan singh
- 1656 - 1683: Rao Subha Karan singh
- 1683 - 1706: Rao Dalpat singh
- 1706 – 1733: Rao Ramchandra Singh
- 1733 – 1762: Rao Indrajit Singh
- 1762 – 1801: Rao Shatrujit Singh

=== Rajas ===
The following rulers carried the title "Raja":

- 1801 – 1839: Raja Parichhat Singh
- 1839 – 20 Nov 1857: Raja Bijai Singh Bahadur
- 1857 – 1865: Raja Bhavani Singh (b. 1846 – d. 1907)

=== Maharajas ===
The following rulers carried the title "Maharaja Sir Lokendra". The title came into effect from the year 1877:

- 1865 – Jul 1907: Bhavani Singh Judeo Bahadur (s.a.)
- 5 August 1907 – 15 August 1947: Govind Singh Judeo Bahadur G.C.I.E. K.C.S.I. (b. 1886 – d. 1951)

=== Heads of the family in the Republic Of India ===
- 1947 – 1951: Govind Singh Judeo
- 1951 – 1978: Balbhadra Singh Judeo
- 1978 – 2006: Kishan Singh Judeo
- 2006 – 2020: Rajendra Singh Judeo
- 2020 – present: Arunaditya Singh Judeo

== Prime Ministers ==
- ? – 1876: Dewan Piareyjoo
- 1876 – 1878: Dewan Mannu Lal
- 1878 – 1891: Dewan Gharibdas
- 1891 – 1907: Dewan Janki Pershad
- 1907 – 1911: Dewan Narain Sheopuri
- 1943 – 1946: Dewan Sayed Ainuddin

== Postal/Philatelic Information ==
Datia stamp (1893)

From 1893, there were primitive stamps bearing both the names 'DUTTIA STATE' and 'DATIA STATE'. The first issue is among the rarest of all Indian princely state stamps. A total of 29 series of stamps were issued until 1920. From 1921 only Indian Stamps were valid.

== See also ==
- Datia District
- Datia Palace
