= Badoni =

Town in Madhya Pradesh, India

Badoni Khurd
- Town
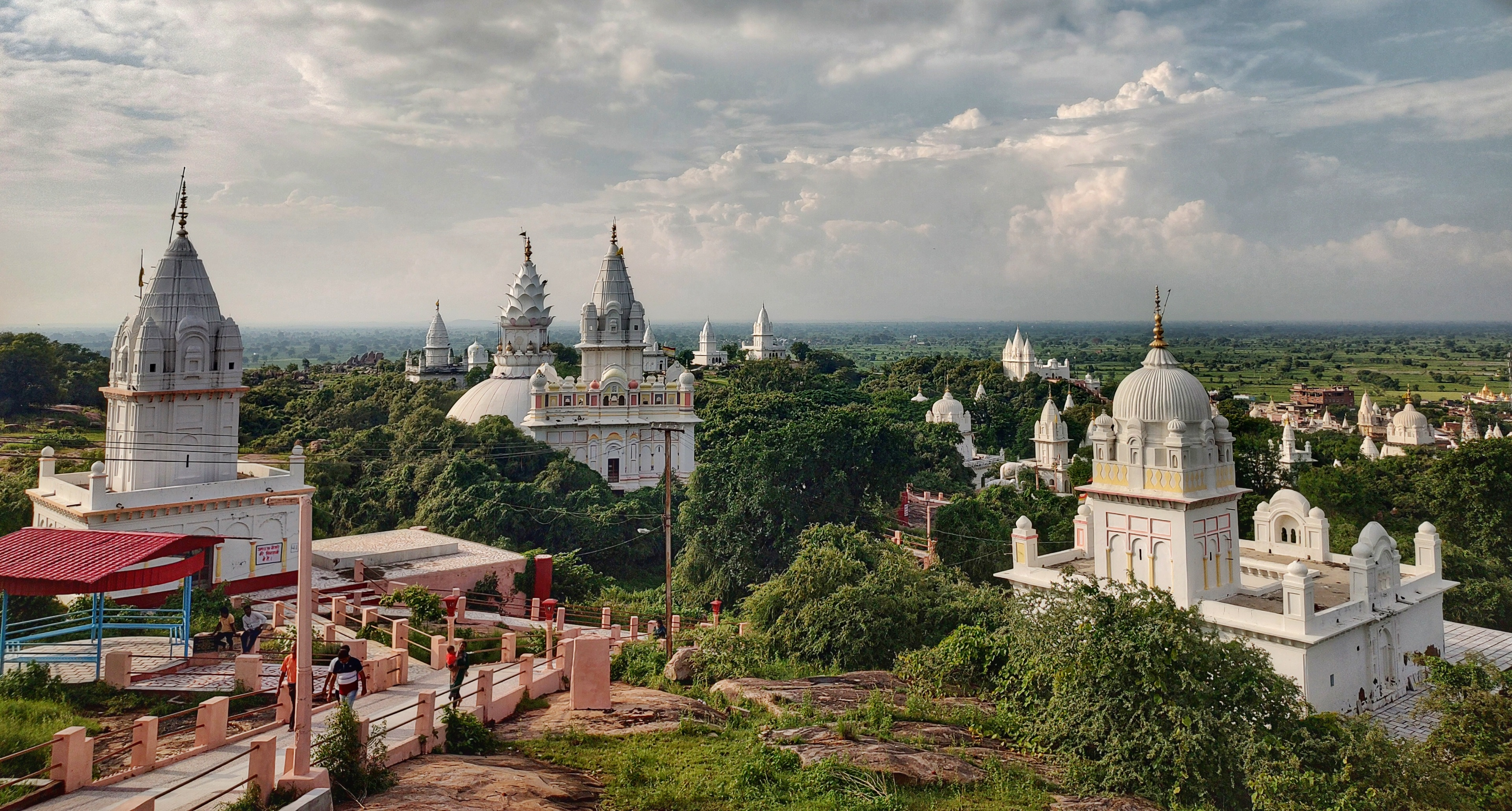
- Sonagiri, Badoni

- Location in Madhya Pradesh, India
- Coordinates: 25.68°N 78.37°E
- Country: India
- State: Madhya Pradesh
- District: Datia

Government
  - Type: Nagar Parishad

Population (2011)
  - Total: 10,309

Languages
  - Official: Hindi
- Time zone: UTC+5:30 (IST)
- Pin Code: 475686
- Vehicle registration: MP 32

Badoni is a town and a Nagar Parishad in Datia District of Madhya Pradesh in India. A Tehsil headquarter, it is 12 km away from the district headquarters Datia.

== Geography ==
Badoni is located on 25.68°N 78.37°E. It has an average elevation of 211 metres (692 . Badoni is located in the Bundelkhand Region of Madhya Pradesh.

== Demographics ==
As per the 2011 census, Badoni Nagar Panchayat has a population of 10,309, of which 5,426 are males and 4,883 are females a sex ratio of 900 females per 1000 males.

Religion in Badoni
Religion	Percent
Hindus	96.40%
Muslims	03.26%
Jains	0.00%
Buddhist	0.5%
Christians	0.21%

== Administration ==
Badoni is a Nagar Panchayat city. The city is divided into 15 wards for which elections are held every 5 years. Badoni Nagar Panchayat has total administration of over 2,176 houses to which it supplies basic amenities like water and sewerage.

== Popular in media ==
1988's Sunny Deol's Movie Yateem shot in a Haveli in Badoni. The mansion is shown as Krishna's (Sunny Deol) house.

== Places of attraction ==
- Badoni Fort
- Raja Narayan Singh Palace - Haveli Badoni
- Gupteshwar Mahadev Temple
- Sonagiri Jain Temples (5 km away)

== Transport ==
- Roadways :

Badoni is well connected with roads. Badoni is connected by private bus services to all nearby major cities.

- Railways :

nearest railway station is Datia railway station, 12 km from Badoni.

- Airways :

nearest Airport is Datia Airport , 15 km and Gwalior Airport, 85 km from Badoni.
