= Datia district =

- District of Madhya Pradesh
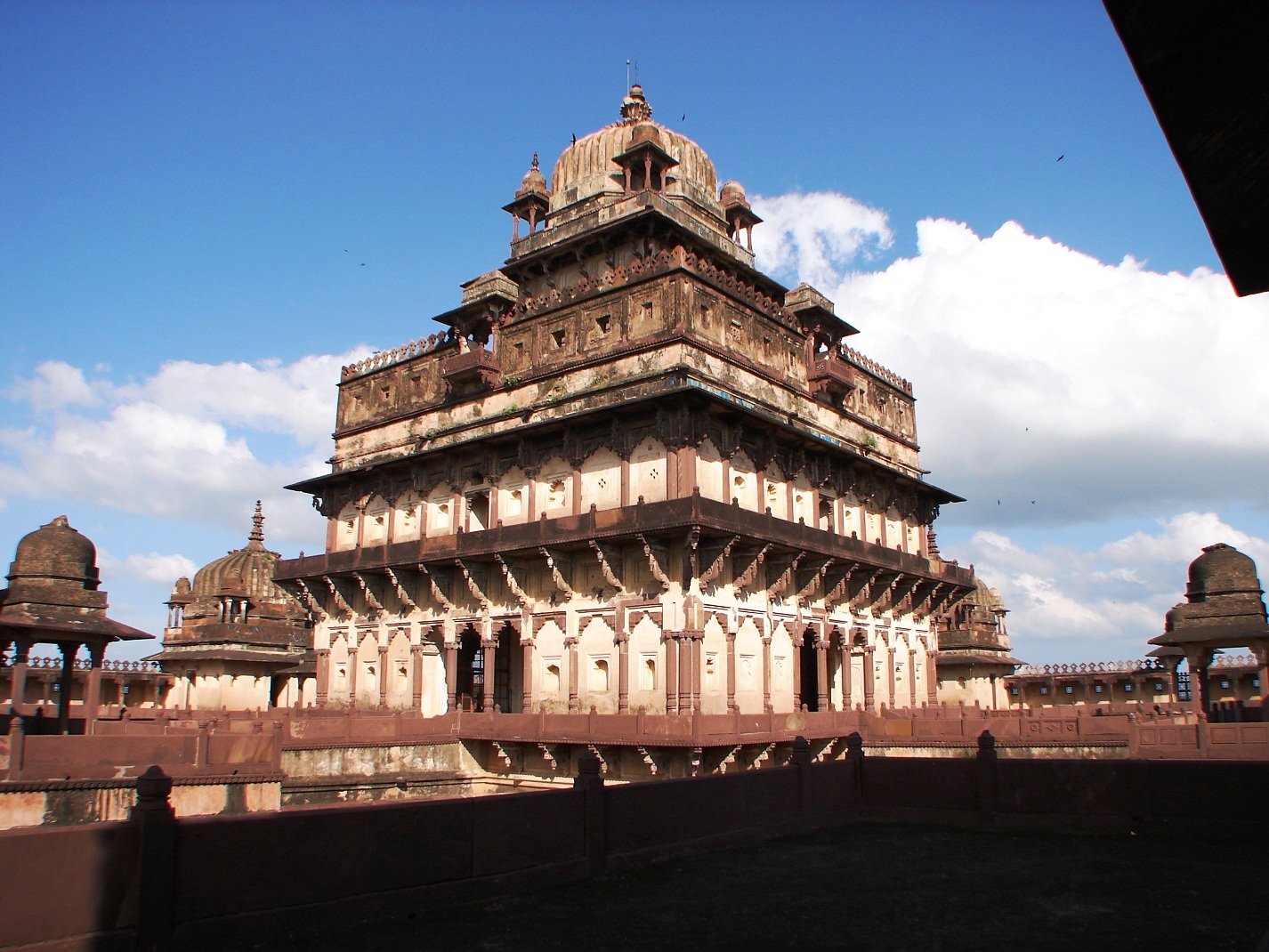
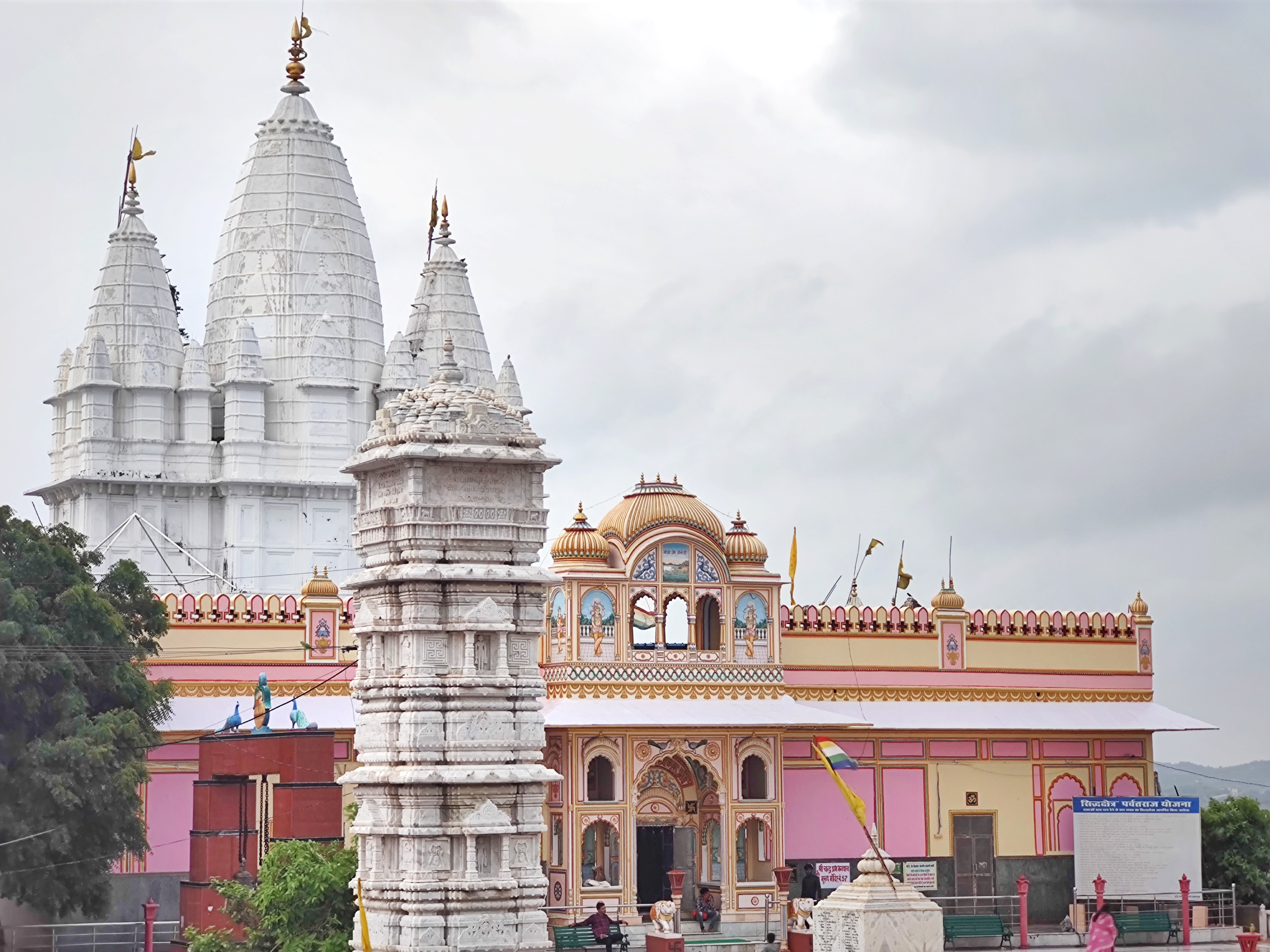
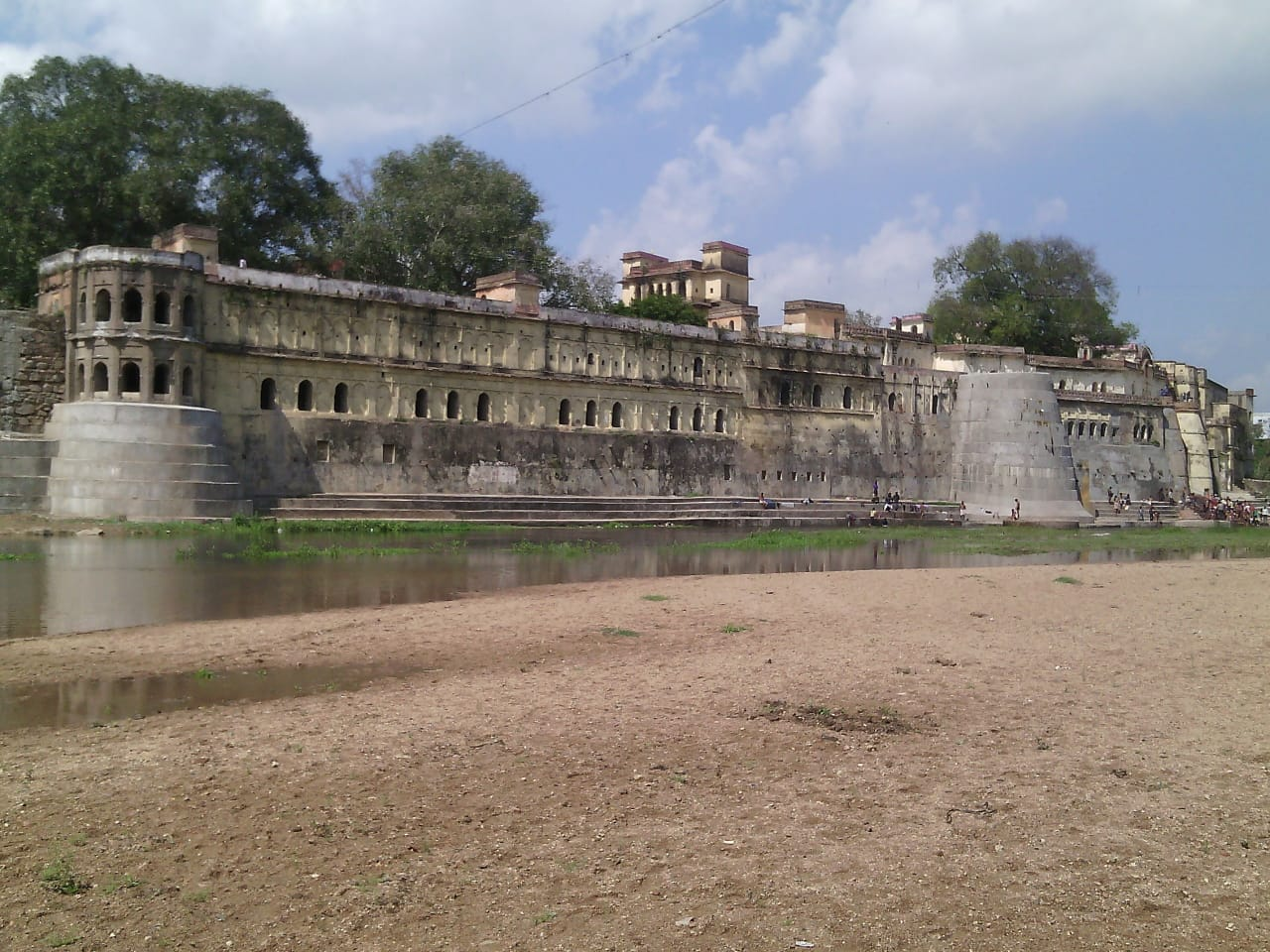
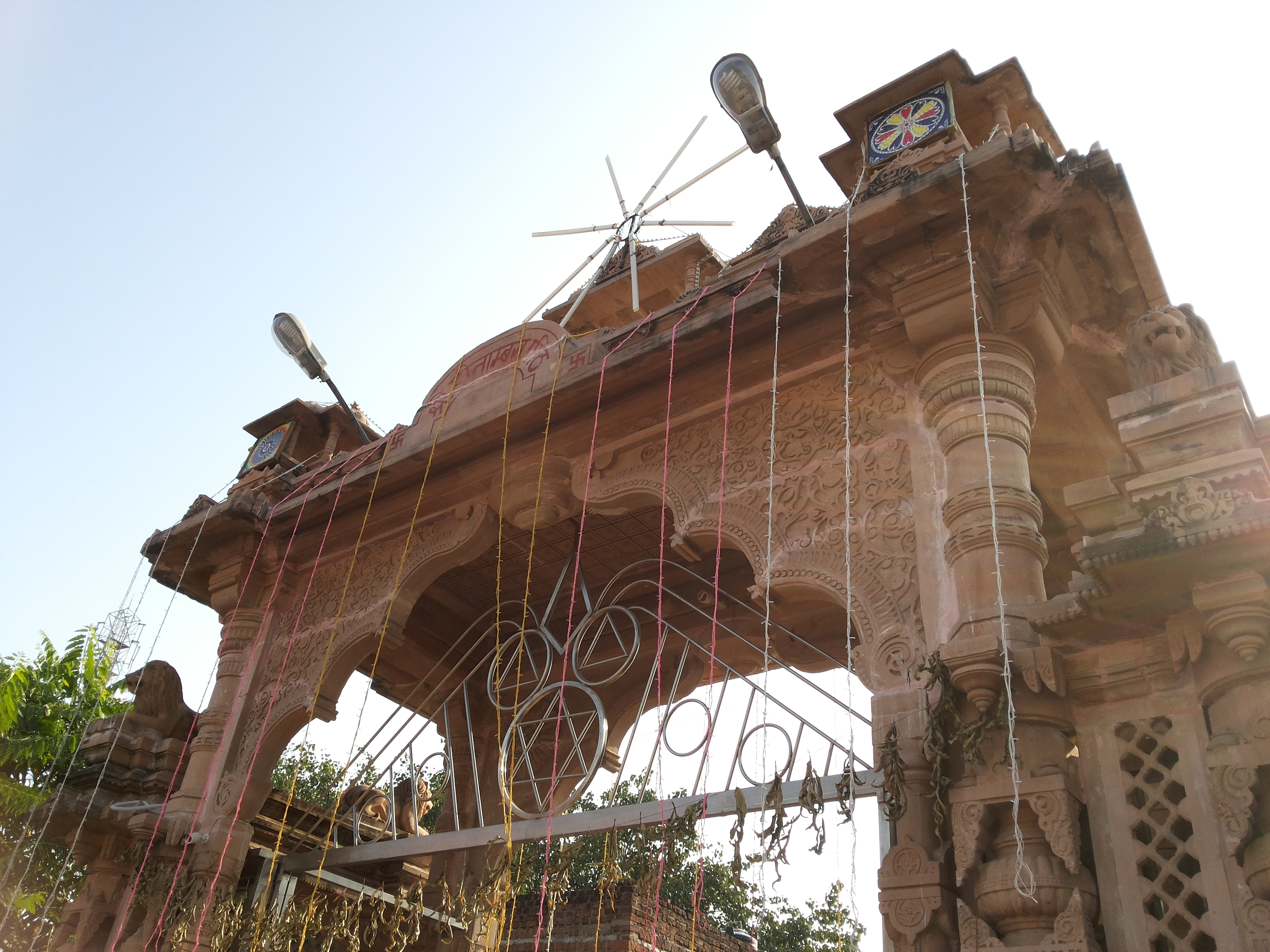
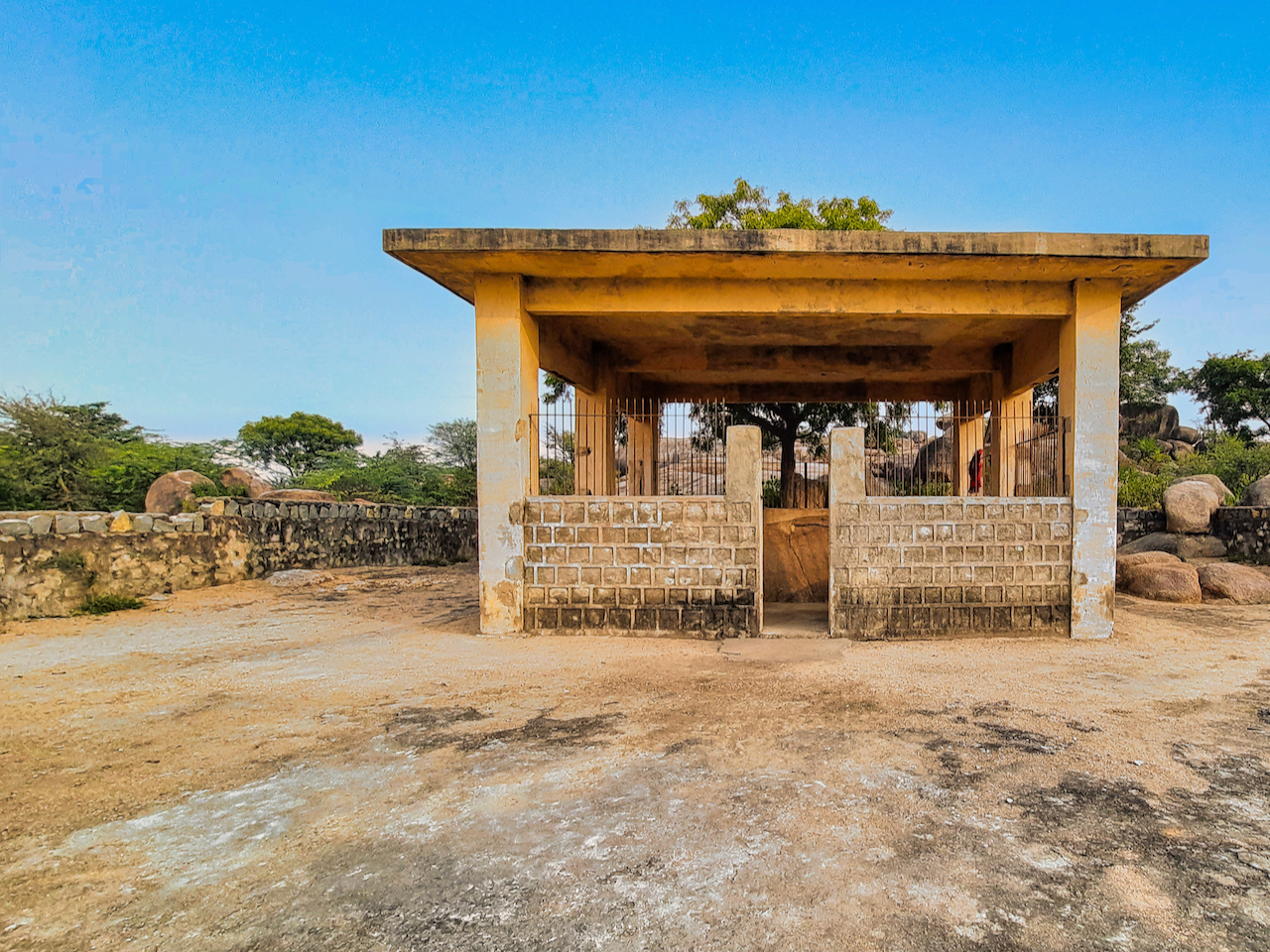
- Clockwise from top-left: Datia Palace, Chandraprabha Temple in Sonagiri, Pitambara Peeth, Emperor Ashok Rock inscription in Gujarra, Surya Temple, Unao

- Location of Datia district in Madhya Pradesh
- Country: India
- State: Madhya Pradesh
- Division: Gwalior
- Headquarters: Datia
- Tehsils: Datia, Seondha, Bhander, Indergarh, Badoni

Government
  - Collector & District Magistrate: Mr.Sanjay Kumar IAS
  - Lok Sabha constituencies: Bhind
  - Vidhan Sabha constituencies: Datia Seondha and Bhander

Area
  - Total: 2,902 km^{2} (1,120 sq mi)

Population (2011)
  - Total: 786,754
  - Density: 271.1/km^{2} (702.2/sq mi)
  - Urban: 181,976

Demographics
  - Literacy: 72.63 per cent
  - Sex ratio: 873
- Time zone: UTC+05:30 (IST)
- Vehicle registration: MP 32
- Major highways: NH44
- Website: datia.nic.in

Datia district (Hindi pronunciation: [d̪ət̪ɪjaː]) is one of important district in Gwalior Division in the Indian state of Madhya Pradesh. The town of Datia is its district headquarters.

== History ==
Emperor Ashok rock inscription present in gujarra. Datia had formerly been a state in the Bundelkhand region. The ruling family were Rajputs of the Bundela clan; they descended from a younger son of a former raja of Orchha. The chief rulers of Datia were Bhagwan Rao, Shubhkaran Rao, Dalpat Rao and Ramchandra and they had good relations with the Mughals. There is a fort palace at Datia, the architecture of which is chiefly Indo-Islamic which partly inspired the chief architect Edward Lutyens, while designing New Delhi. The state was administered as part of the Bundelkhand agency of Central India. It lay in the extreme north-west of Bundelkhand, near Gwalior, and was surrounded on all sides by other princely states of Central India, except on the east where it bordered upon the United Provinces. It was second highest in the rank of all the Bundela states after Orchha, with a 15-gun salute, and its Maharajas bore the hereditary title of Second of the Princes of Bundelkhand. The land area of the state was 2130 km^{2} and its population in 1901 was 173,759.

Datia, together with the rest of the Bundelkhand agency, became part of the new state of Vindhya Pradesh in 1950. In 1956, Vindhya Pradesh state was merged with certain other areas to form the state of Madhya Pradesh within the Union of India.

== Geography ==
The district has an area of 2,691 km^{2}, and a population 627,818 (2001 census). The population of Datia District increased by 26% from 1981 to 1991, and by 22% from 1991 to 2001. The district has 445 villages and 5 towns, Datia, Badoni, Seondha, Bhander and Indergarh. Each town is the headquarters of its tehsil.

Datia is bounded by the Madhya Pradesh districts of Bhind to the north, Gwalior to the west, and Shivpuri to the south, and by Jhansi District of Uttar Pradesh state to the east. The district is part of Gwalior Division. Sindh River and Pahuj River is major river of District.

=== Village ===
- Unao
- Basai
- Chirula
- Neemdanda

== Demographics ==
Historical population
Year	Pop.	±% p.a.
1901	210,237	—
1911	186,545	−1.19%
1921	181,211	−0.29%
1931	195,383	+0.76%
1941	220,175	+1.20%
1951	229,506	+0.42%
1961	278,957	+1.97%
1971	355,166	+2.44%
1981	431,791	+1.97%
1991	544,547	+2.35%
2001	664,159	+2.01%
2011	786,754	+1.71%

Religions in Datia district (2011)
Religion	Percent
Hinduism	95.04%
Islam	3.62%
Buddhism	1.01%
Other or not stated	0.33%

According to the 2011 census Datia District has a population of 786,754 roughly equal to the nation of Comoros or the US state of South Dakota. This gives it a ranking of 487th in India (out of a total of 640). The district has a population density of 271 inhabitants per square kilometre (700/sq mi) with 76% living in rural regions and 24% living in urban areas. Its population growth rate over the decade 2001-2011 was 18.4%. Datia has a sex ratio of 873 females for every 1000 males, and a literacy rate of 72.63%. 23.13% of the population lives in urban areas. Scheduled Castes and Scheduled Tribes make up 25.46% and 1.91% of the population respectively.

=== Languages ===
Languages of Datia district (2011)
1. Hindi (91.1%)
2. Bundeli (8.16%)
3. Others (0.78%)

At the time of the 2011 Census of India, 91.06% of the population in the district spoke Hindi and 8.16% Bundeli as their first language. Bundelkhandi is the main dialect of the district.

== Places of interest ==
- Pitambara Peeth
- Ratangarh Mata Temple
- Sonagiri
- Unao Balaji Sun Temple
- Datia Palace
- Sankua Kund

== See also ==
- Datia State
