= Bhander =

- Town
- Location in Madhya Pradesh, India
- Coordinates: 25.73°N 78.75°E
- Country: India
- State: Madhya Pradesh
- District: Datia

Government
  - Body: Nagar palika
- Elevation: 211 m (692 ft)

Population (2001)
  - Total: 20,665

Languages
  - Official: Hindi
- Time zone: UTC+5:30 (IST)
- Postal code: 475335

Bhander is a town and a nagar panchayat in Datia district in the state of Madhya Pradesh.

== Geography ==
Bhander is located at 25.73°N 78.75°E. It has an average elevation of 211 metres (692 feet). Pahuj River flow's from the town boundary.

== Demographics ==
As of 2001 India census, Bhander had a population of 20665. Males constitute 53% of the population and females 47%. Bhander has an average literacy rate of 68%, higher than the national average of 59.5%; with male literacy of 76% and female literacy of 59%. 16% of the population is under 6 years of age.

== Transport ==
=== Road ===
Bhander is well connected with Datia and also with Jhansi via state highway and National Highway. Jhansi- Kanpur Highway is around 20 km from Bhander towards Chirgaon. One more way is connected to bhander to jhansi via Unao. Which is shortest path jhansi to bhander and bhander very short path to Bhander-Dhamna - jhansi only 32km.

=== Railways ===
Nearest railway junction to Bhander is Jhansi Jn. which is around 50 km. Other railway stations which are closer to Bhander are Datia Railway Station and Chirgaon railway station and Moth railway station.

== Politics ==
The town is represented in the Madhya Pradesh Legislative Assembly by the Bhander Assembly constituency. As of 2020, its representative is Raksha Santram Saroniya, of the Bharatiya Janata Party.
