= Yateem =

1988 film by J. P. Dutta

- Theatrical release poster
- Directed by: J. P. Dutta
- Screenplay by: J. P. Dutta
- Dialogues by: O. P. Dutta
- Story by: J. P. Dutta
- Produced by: Bikram Singh Dahal
- Starring: Sunny Deol; Farah; Danny Denzongpa; Kulbhushan Kharbanda; Sujata Mehta; Amrish Puri
- Cinematography: Ishwar R. Bidri
- Edited by: Deepak Wirkud; M.D. Worlikar
- Music by: Laxmikant–Pyarelal
- Production company: Bikramjeet Films International
- Distributed by: Eros International
- Release date: 2 December 1988
- Country: India
- Language: Hindi
- Box office: ₹3.10 crore

Yateem (transl. Orphan) is a 1988 Indian Hindi-language revisionist Western film co-written and directed by J. P. Dutta. It stars Sunny Deol, Farah, Danny Denzongpa, Kulbhushan Kharbanda, Sujata Mehta and Amrish Puri. The film was a major hit at the box office.

== Plot ==
Yateem revolves around the story of an orphan. The story begins with Inspector Shiv Kumar Yadav, a principled and compassionate police officer, who finds himself in a morally complex situation. During a police encounter, he kills a dacoit named Ujagar Singh, and unfortunately Ujagar's wife also gets killed by accident, leaving their infant son an orphan. Moved by the child's helplessness, Yadav makes a life-altering decision: he adopts the baby boy, naming him Krishna. Krishna is raised in the Yadav household alongside Shiv Kumar's own daughter, Gauri, and the two children develop an inseparable bond.

Growing up, Krishna faces immense prejudice. The local community and even members of his own adopted family, particularly Shiv Kumar's elderly mother, taunt him relentlessly for being the "son of a dacoit". Krishna endures these insults with quiet strength, finding solace only in the unwavering love and support of Gauri. Their childhood friendship blossoms into a deep and innocent love as they grow into young adults.

Driven by a desire to prove his worth and honour his adopted father, Krishna decides to follow in Shiv Kumar's footsteps and joins the police force. During his time at the police academy, Shiv Kumar remarries a much younger woman named Chanchal. Chanchal is cunning, manipulative, and secretly having an affair with a police officer, Inspector Girivar Prasad Mathur.

When Krishna returns home as a newly minted police inspector, he finds his family dynamics completely altered. Chanchal is instantly smitten with Krishna when she sees him for the first time. She gets seduced just by watching Krishna doing household chores. Ever since, she aches to have him. Sensing the deep affection between Krishna and Gauri, she becomes jealous and tries to create a rift between them but fails to break their bond. She, then, desperately tries to entice Krishna for sex but he rejects her advances. Enraged by his rejection, Chanchal's spite turns into a vicious plot as she wants to punish him for rejecting her. She falsely accuses Krishna of raping her, knowing it will destroy his relationship with Shiv Kumar and end his career.

Shiv Kumar, blinded by his new wife's lies, is devastated and furious. Without a moment's hesitation, he beats his own adopted son, and has him arrested and thrown in jail. With Krishna out of the way, Chanchal proceeds with her plan to marry Gauri off to Girivar, securing her wealth and ensuring her own control over the Yadav family. Gauri, however, refuses to be a pawn in their game.

Meanwhile, Krishna, imprisoned for a crime he didn't commit, learns of the forced marriage. Desperate, he orchestrates a daring prison break. He races against time, crashing the wedding ceremony and kidnapping Gauri to save her from the forced union. On the run from both the police and Girivar's men, Krishna and Gauri find refuge in the rugged, desolate ravines of Chambal, a notorious den of dacoits.

It is in these ravines that Krishna's past and present collide. He comes face-to-face with dacoit Purkhiya, the feared leader of the very gang his biological father had earlier led. Through a series of tense encounters and revelations, Krishna learns the full, tragic truth about his parents' deaths and his true identity. He discovers that his father was not a heartless criminal but a victim of a corrupt system, and his own moral compass has been a testament to his innate goodness, not his bloodline.

The plot builds to an explosive climax as Krishna, armed with the truth, prepares for a final showdown. He must clear his name, expose Chanchal and Girivar's treachery, and win back the trust of his father, Shiv Kumar. In a series of intense action sequences, Krishna uses his police training and his deep knowledge of the ravines to confront his enemies. He ultimately proves Chanchal's lies and defeats Girivar, but not without immense personal cost.

The story's conclusion sees the truth come to light, and Krishna, no longer an orphan in the eyes of the world, is finally reunited with the girl who never lost faith in him.

== Cast ==
- Sunny Deol as Inspector Krishna Yadav
- Farah as Gauri Yadav – Krishna’s childhood love, later wife
- Danny Denzongpa as Inspector Girivar Prasad Mathur
- Kulbhushan Kharbanda as Inspector Shiv Kumar Yadav – Gauri’s father, Krishna’s adoptive father
- Sujata Mehta as Chanchal Yadav
- Amrish Puri as Dacoit Purkhiya
- Dalip Tahil as Ujagar Singh – Krishna’s biological father
- Beena as Ujagar's wife – Krishna’s biological mother
- Rammohan Sharma as Ramchandra
- Asha Sharma as Parvati
- Dina Pathak as Shiv Kumar's Mother

== Filming ==
The film was shot on-site at a haveli in the Badonikhurad Village of Datia, Madhya Pradesh.

== Music and soundtrack ==
Laxmikant–Pyarelal composed the film’s music and the lyrics of the songs were penned by Hasan Kamal.

Title	Singer(s)
"Teri Nigah Pe Sab Kuch Lootane Aaye" - 1	Mohammad Aziz, Sukhwinder Singh
"Dil Ne Chaha Hai Kya"	Kavita Krishnamurthy
"Rut Piya Milan Ki"	Sukhwinder Singh, Kavita Krishnamurthy
"Aake Tujh Par"	Shabbir Kumar, Kavita Krishnamurthy
"Teri Nigah Pe Sab Kuch Lootane Aaye" - 2	Mohammed Aziz, Sukhwinder Singh
"Itna Aasan Nahi"	Kavita Krishnamurthy
