= Basai, Datia =

Village in Madhya Pradesh, India

Basai
- Town
- Location in Madhya Pradesh, India
- Coordinates: 25.15°N 78.41°E
- Country: India
- State: Madhya Pradesh
- District: Datia

Government
  - Type: Gram Panchayat

Population (2011)
  - Total: 5,712

Languages
  - Official: Hindi
- Time zone: UTC+5:30 (IST)
- Pin Code: 475661
- Vehicle registration: MP 32

Basai is a village in Datia District of Madhya Pradesh. The Pin Code of Basai is 475661.

== Geography ==
Basai is Located on 25.15°N 78.41°E. It has an average elevation of 211 m (692 ft).

== Demographics ==
As per Census 2011, Basai has population of 5,712 of which 3,009 are males and 2,703 are females.

== Transportation ==
Basai is well connected with roads. Basai Railway Station is on the Agra-Bhopal railway line.
