= Chirula, Datia =

Village in Madhya Pradesh, central India

Chirula
- Village
- Location in Madhya Pradesh, India
- Coordinates: 25.5778449°N 78.4841558°E
- Country: India
- State: Madhya Pradesh
- District: Datia

Area
  - Total: 5.989 km^{2} (2.312 sq mi)

Population (2011)
  - Total: 2,412
  - Density: 402.7/km^{2} (1,043/sq mi)

Languages
  - Official: Hindi
- Time zone: UTC+5:30 (IST)
- Sex ratio: 0.828 ♂/♀

Chirula is a village situated in Datia District of Indian state of Madhya Pradesh. The population according to the latest census is 2,412.

== Demographics ==
Caste composition
Caste	Percent
SC	33.29%
ST	0.12%
Others†	66.59%
Caste composition † Other Backward Class and Forward caste.

According to the latest 2011 census, Chirula has a population of 2,412 divided into 604 families. The male population is 1,299 and that of females is 1,113. Chirula has an average literacy rate of 71.96 percent, higher than the state average of 69.32 percent. The male literacy rate is 83.74 percent, and the female literacy is 58.28 percent. In Chirula, 14.55 percent of the population is under 6 years of age. Out of the total population, 1,027 are engaged in work or business activity.

Scheduled Castes and Scheduled Tribes constitute 33.29 percent and 0.12 percent of the total population in Chirula.

== Administration ==
Chirula village comes under the administration of Datia Tehsil. The village code is 454765 and it is administered by a sarpanch. Chirula has one primary school, one secondary school, one primary health sub-center, and a post office. The total income and expenditure are approximately ₹124 lakh (US$130,000) and ₹111 lakh (US$120,000) with a total irrigated area of 171 hectares. There are a total of 277 boys and 267 girls enrolled in schools between the age of 5-14.
