= Seondha =

- Town
- Location in Madhya Pradesh, India Seondha (India)
- Coordinates: 26.16°N 78.78°E
- Country: India
- State: Madhya Pradesh
- District: Datia
- Elevation: 152 m (499 ft)

Population (2001)
  - Total: 19,540

Languages
  - Official: Hindi
- Time zone: UTC+5:30 (IST)
- Postal code: 475682
- ISO 3166 code: IN-MP
- Vehicle registration: MP
- Website: www.facebook.com/seondha

Seondha is a town and nagar panchayat in the Datia district of Madhya Pradesh, India. Situated along the banks of the Sindh River, the town is known for its historical, cultural, and spiritual significance. Seondha features remnants of an old fortress dating back to the Datia era and is located close to the Ratangarh Temple, approximately 15 km away.

Nearby, the Sankua Kund waterfall holds religious importance in Hinduism. According to local belief, the Four Kumaras — Sanaka, Sanandana, Sanatana, and Sanatkumara — meditate there in their eternal child forms.

== Geography ==
Seondha is located at 26.16°N 78.78°E. The town has an average elevation of 152 metres (498 feet) above sea level. The Sindh River flows alongside the town and plays a role in local agriculture, religious practices, and daily life.

== Climate ==
Seondha experiences a warm and temperate climate. Winters are generally dry and mild, while summers are hot with monsoon rainfall. According to the Köppen–Geiger climate classification, Seondha has a Cwa (humid subtropical) climate.

- Average annual temperature: ~26.0 °C
- Average annual rainfall: ~881 mm
- Driest month: April (≈2 mm rainfall)
- Wettest month: August (≈305 mm rainfall)

== Demographics ==
According to the

, Seondha had a population of 19,540.

- Male population: 55%
- Female population: 45%
- Average literacy rate: 60%

- Male literacy: 69%
- Female literacy: 49%

- Population under six years of age: ~16%

== History ==
Seondha has historical roots linked to the former princely state of Datia. The town developed as a river-side settlement and religious centre, with Sankua Kund emerging as a pilgrimage site.

A major annual religious fair (melā) is held at Sankua Kund on Purnima (full moon day) following Diwali, during which devotees take a ritual bath in the Sindh River.

=== Origin of the Poddar Community ===
Seondha is traditionally regarded as one of the ancestral origin places of the Poddar community. According to local historical accounts, members of this community were originally known as Guptas. The title "Poddar", meaning treasurer or custodian of wealth, was bestowed upon a Gupta who served as the royal treasurer in the court of the King of Seondha.

== See also ==
- Sewda Assembly constituency
- Ratangarh, Datia
- Datia district
- Sindh River
