= Government Medical College, Datia =

- Type: Medical College and Hospital
- Established: 2018; 8 years ago
- Academic affiliations: Madhya Pradesh Medical Science University
- Dean: Dr. Deepak S. Maravi
- Undergraduates: MBBS-340
- Location: 29 th Battalion, N.H.-75, Datia, Madhya Pradesh, 475661, India; 25.674°N 78.438°E
- Website: https://www.datiamedicalcollege.com

Government Medical College, Datia is a full-fledged tertiary Medical college in Datia, Madhya Pradesh. It was established in the year 2018. The college imparts the degree of Bachelor of Medicine and Surgery (MBBS). Datia medical college currently has 120 seats for MBBS course. Nursing and para-medical courses are also offered. The college is affiliated to Madhya Pradesh Medical Science University and is recognized by National Medical Commission. The selection to the college is done on the basis of merit through National Eligibility and Entrance Test. The college has started MBBS courses from August 2018.

== Courses ==
Government Medical College, Datia undertakes the education and training of students MBBS courses since 2018. Various Paramedical courses also offered by the datia medical college since 2021.
