= John Proudfoot Stratton =

Scottish physician

- Born: 2 July 1830; Caputh, Perth and Kinross, Scotland
- Died: 8 August 1895 (aged 65); South Kensington, London, England
- Occupation: Physician
- Spouse: Georgina Anderson (m. 1859)
- Children: 6

John Proudfoot Stratton (2 July 1830 – 8 August 1895) was a Scottish physician.

== Biography ==
Stratton son of David Stratton, a solicitor in practice at Perth, was born in the parish of Caputh, near Dunkeld, on 2 July 1830. He was educated in his native town and afterwards at North Shields, where he was apprenticed about 1840 to Dr. Ingham. He was admitted a licentiate of the Royal College of Surgeons of Edinburgh in 1851, bachelor of medicine of the university of Aberdeen in 1852, and M.D. in 1855. At Aberdeen University he gained the medal or a first-class in every subject of study.

In May 1852 he gained, by competitive examination, a nomination offered to the university of Aberdeen by the chairman of the East India Company. After holding various posts in the Indian medical service (Bombay) from 1852 onwards, he was appointed in December 1854 residency surgeon in Baroda, where he took an active part in founding the gaekwar's hospital and in vaccinating the native population. In May 1857 he was, in addition to the medical charge, appointed to act as assistant resident. He performed the duties with ability during the trying years of the mutiny, and received the thanks of the resident, Sir Richmond Campbell Shakespear. On the latter's departure for England, Stratton acted as resident until the arrival of Col. (Sir) R. Wallace. In 1859 he was selected to take political charge of Bundelkhand, a district embracing several minor states at that time disordered by bands of mutineers and rebels. His services were again acknowledged by the government, while the company marked its sense of their importance by a special grant of extra pay. He was appointed in 1862 commissioner and sessions judge for Bundelkhand and Baghelkhand, and he was promoted in June 1864 from political assistant to be political agent; while from May to July 1876 he was officiating resident. On 4 March 1881 he was appointed officiating resident in Mewar. In July he was posted to the western states of Rajputana, and on 27 January 1882 to Jeypur in the eastern states. He retired from the service under the fifty-five years age rule in 1885 with the rank of brigade-surgeon. He died at 51 Nevern Square, South Kensington, on 8 August 1895, and is buried in Brookwood cemetery. He married, on 12 April 1859, Georgina Anderson, by whom he had six children.

Stratton did excellent service in his capacity of political agent. He obtained from the native chiefs free remission of transit duties; he personally laid out hill roads; he established the Bundelkhand Rajkumar College for sons of chiefs, and instituted vaccination in Central India.
