= Sindh River =

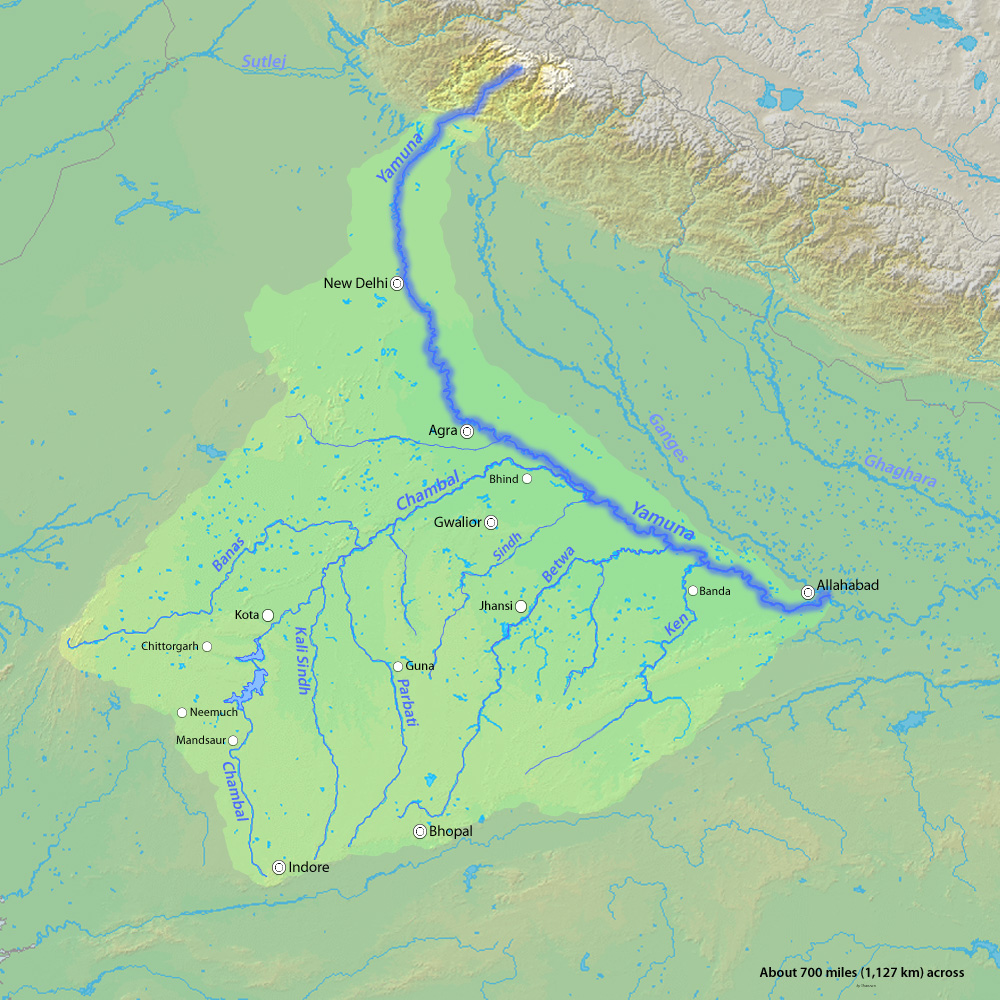
- The Sindh River is a tributary of the Yamuna River.

Location
- Country: India
- State: Madhya Pradesh, Uttar Pradesh
- Major Cities: Narwar, Gwalior, Seondha

Physical characteristics
- Source: Malwa Plateau
  - location: Vidisha district, Madhya Pradesh
- Mouth: Yamuna River
  - location: Etawah district, Uttar Pradesh
  - coordinates: 26°26′17″N 79°12′43″E
- Length: 470 km (290 mi)
- Basin size: 26,699 km^{2}

Basin features
- Tributaries
  - left: Kwari River
  - right: Mahuar River, Pahuj River

The Sindh River, a tributary of the Yamuna River, flows through the Indian states of Madhya Pradesh and Uttar Pradesh.

== Course ==
The Sindh originates on the Malwa Plateau in Vidisha district, and flows north-northeast through the districts of Guna, Ashoknagar, Shivpuri, Datia, Gwalior and Bhind in Madhya Pradesh to join the Yamuna River in Jalaun district, Uttar Pradesh, just after the confluence of the Chambal River with the Yamuna River. It has a total length of 470 kilometres (290 mi), out of which 461 kilometres (286 mi) are in Madhya Pradesh and 9 kilometres (5.6 mi) are in Uttar Pradesh.

=== Tributaries ===
The major tributaries of the Sindh are the Parbati, Pahuj, Kwari (Kunwari), and Mahuar. The Mahuar River is also locally known as the Samoha River and passes through the former Karera Wildlife Sanctuary.kanera River in kindar is a local tributary of the Sindh River in Guna district.

== Dam ==
Manikheda Dam has been constructed across the Sindh River in Shivpuri district and a Pickup Dam named as Mohini Sagar is situated downstream.
