= Datia Airport =

Upcoming airport in Datia, Madhya Pradesh, India

- IATA: DPP; ICAO: VIDT

Summary
- Airport type: Public
- Owner/Operator: Airport Authority of India
- Serves: Datia and Jhansi
- Location: Datia, Madhya Pradesh
- Time zone: Indian Standard Time (+5:30)
- Coordinates: 25°38′59.9″N 078°30′11.4″E

Map
- Location of the airport in Madhya Pradesh Datia Airport (India)

Statistics (April 2025 – March 2026)
- Passengers: 800 (▲ -%)
- Aircraft movements: 218 (▲ -%)
- Cargo tonnage: —
- Source: AAI

Datia Airport is an domestic airport located in the state of Madhya Pradesh, India. The airport currently has two scheduled services connecting Bhopal and Khajuraho, and is mainly used by private aircraft and air taxis. There are plans to open a flight school at the airstrip.

== Expansion ==
In 2023, Airport Authority of India started to upgrade the airstrip into a new airport which is also near historical Jhansi city of Uttar Pradesh. The proposed airport is 29 kilometres away from Jhansi City and will serve both cities of Datia and Jhansi. On 21 August 2023, India's civil aviation minister Jyotiraditya Scindia laid the foundation stone for the expansion of the airstrip into a full-fledged airport.
