= Datia Palace =

17th-century palace in Datia, Madhya Pradesh, India

Coordinates: 25°40′15.37″N 78°27′3.68″E

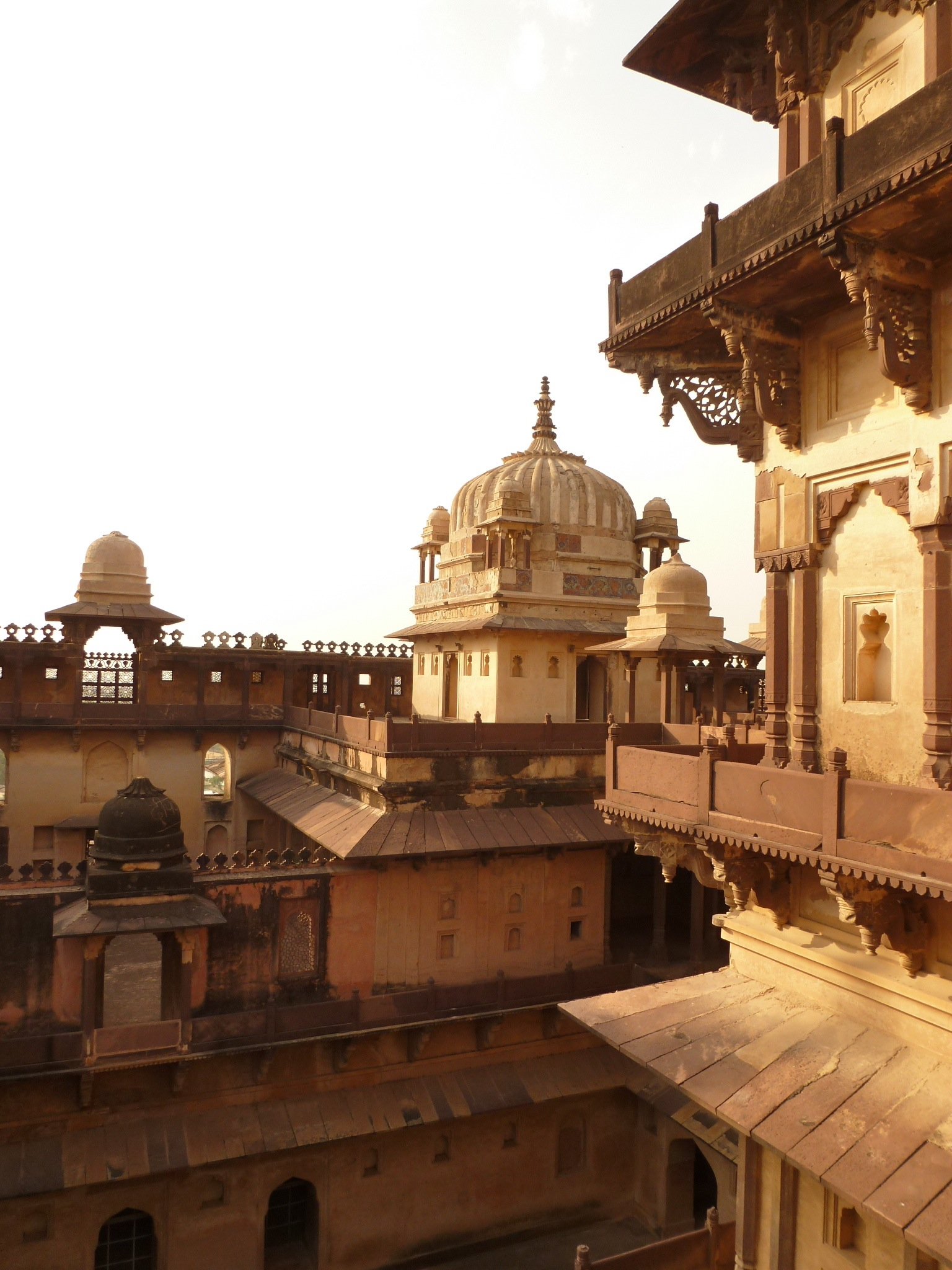
- Established: 1614
- Location: Datia, India
- Type: Monument

Datia Palace, also known as Bir Singh Palace or Bir Singh Dev Palace, is situated nearly 75 km from Gwalior city in Madhya Pradesh. The specialty of the palace is that it has 7 floors and no member of the royal family lived in the palace. The founder of the Datia State in Bundelkhand - Maharaj Birsingh Deo Build many such 52 monuments all around the country. Datia Palace is also known as Satkhanda Palace, Datia Mahal, and Purana Mahal or the "Old Palace". Historian Abdul Hamid Lahori came to this city with Shah Jahan on 19 November 1635. He said that the palace was nearly 80 meters long and was also this much broad. He said this as a very beautiful and strong palace.

This Palace was made by spending 35 Lakh Rupees (78 thousand US dollars), and it took nine years to build it. It is situated on an isolated rock on the western side of the city Datia. It represents Mughal architecture along with Rajput architecture. It is the biggest and most famous of all the 52 palaces build by Raja Bir Singh Deo, and it can be seen easily from a long distance.

== See also ==
- Datia State
