= Indergarh =

- city
- Location in Madhya Pradesh, India
- Coordinates: 25°54′53″N 78°33′54″E
- Country: India
- State: Madhya Pradesh
- District: Datia
- Founder: Maharaja Indersen Singh
- Named for: Indersen

Population (2017)
  - Total: 30,000

Languages
  - Official: Hindi
- Time zone: UTC+5:30 (IST)

Indergarh is a town and a nagar parishad in Datia district in the Indian state of Madhya Pradesh.

It is believed that the name of this village was earlier Dard which later became Indergaon. The ruler of Indergaon was Indersen. He constructed a strong fort here, that gave this place the name Indergarh. The rulers were of Dondaria gotra. Lt. General Khem Karan Singh was also from this clan. That time it was centre of collection of revenue of 58 villages.

== Demographics ==
As of the 2011 Census of India, Indergarh had a population of 23,045. Males constitute 53% of the population and females 47%. Indergarh has an average literacy rate of 79%, higher than the state average of 69%: male literacy is 79%, and female literacy is 69%. In Indergarh, 14% of the population is under 6 years of age.

== History ==
Maharaja Balwant Singh (dabariya clan) in about 1650 A.D founded the State of Indargarh. He is reputed to have had an ancestral patrimony around Shivpuri, some 65 miles West of Gwalior. Whether he emigrated under duress from Shivpuri or brighter prospect abroad beckoned him, or was enticed away from his native Shivpuri by promise of a larger patrimony by the Bundela Chiefs of Orchha and Datia, still remains an enigma. What however is unambiguous is that. Raja Balwan Singh's new principality in the Trans-Sind Region initially comprised some 40 villages along the South Bank of the Sind in the intervening tract between Datia and Seondha. As the principality of Datia was relatively weaker than that of Pichor, it is to be inferred that the principality of Indargarh may have been utilized as a convenient buffer by the Bundela chiefs to constrict Pichor's expansion South of the Sind. This stratagem might even have had the tacit acquiescence of the neighboring Kushwaha ruler of Narwar, who was actuated by a similar design towards Pichhor. Whether the tale is true or apocryphal is however difficult to discern. There is on the other hand no tradition of any enduring internecine feud between the neighboring Hindu principalities of Pichhor and Indargarh. It is however probable that with the interposition of kindred hindu principality as a buffer, the subsequent expansion of Pichhor was deflected Westwards beyond Bhitarwar in the Narwar territory and southeastwards towards Lahar and Daboh.

Maharaja Balwant Singh was succeeded by his son Indar Singh who further enlarged his patrimony and built a stone fort, still extant, which even now perpetuates his name and memory. The principality of Indargarh remained unimpaired during Aurangzeb's and some of the later Mughals' reigns, but had rather a precarious existence during the ascendancy of the Marathas in the 18th century A.D. During this period, the ruler of Indargarh was sometimes constrained to side with the Marathas, the allies of the Bundela Chief, but when left uncoerced joined forces with the neighboring Chiefs of Pichhor and Gohad to resist the Southern intruders. After the demise of Pichhor in 1816 A.D, the principality of Indargarh was also obliterated by the connivance of the Marathas in the beginning of 1817 A.D. and its ruler like his kinsmen of Pichhor and Gohad forced into exile. After the fall of Indargarh all the forts have remained untenanted in this region; staggered in a line between Bhind and Jhansi, they are now like a row of avenging ghosts rather than abodes of patricians of yesteryears.

== Transport ==
Good road transport connectivity. SH19 is passing through middle of city. The nearest railway station is Datia(DAA) and Dabra (i.e. around 30kms).The nearest airport is Gwalior.
