= Datia =

- City
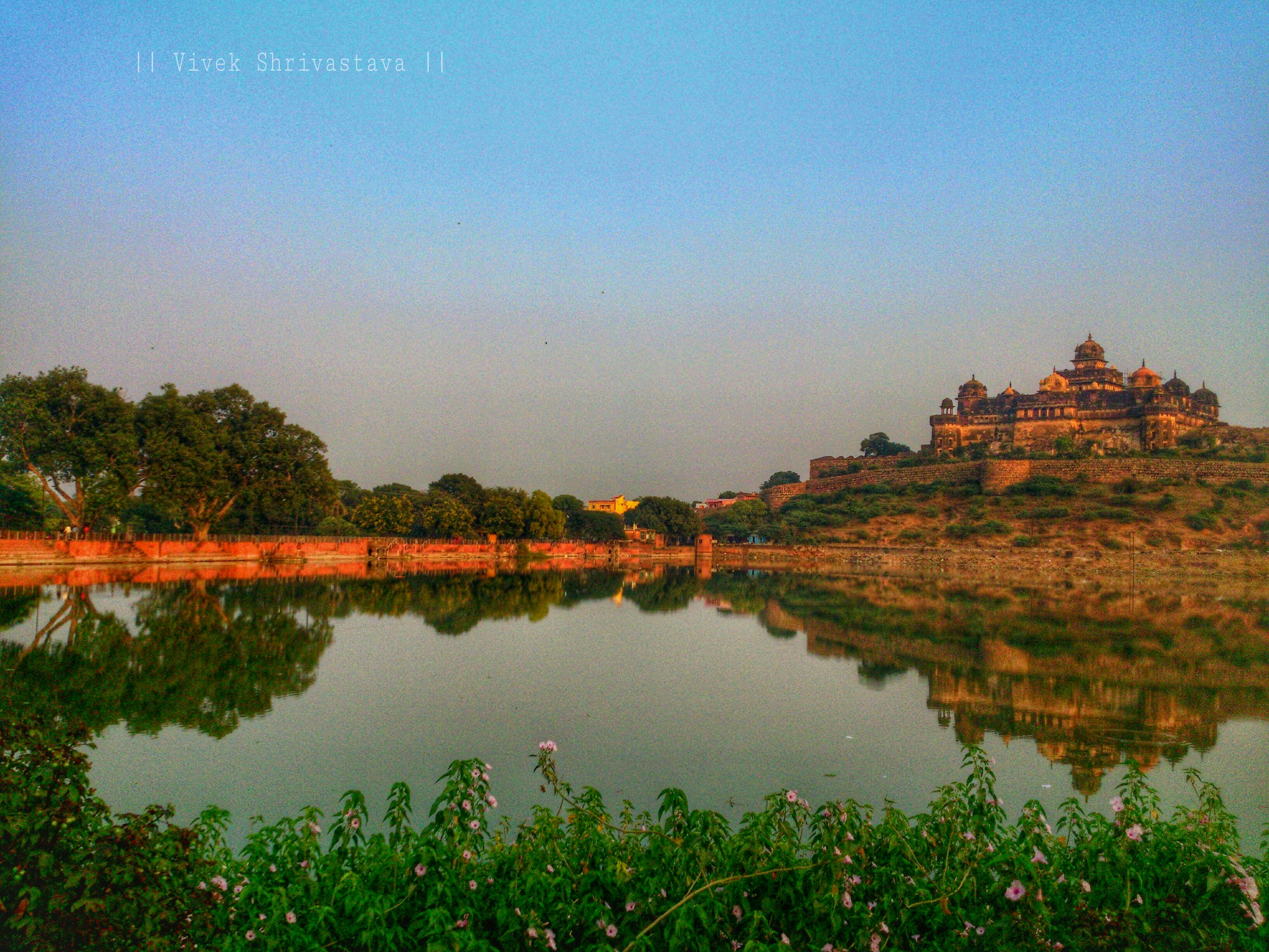
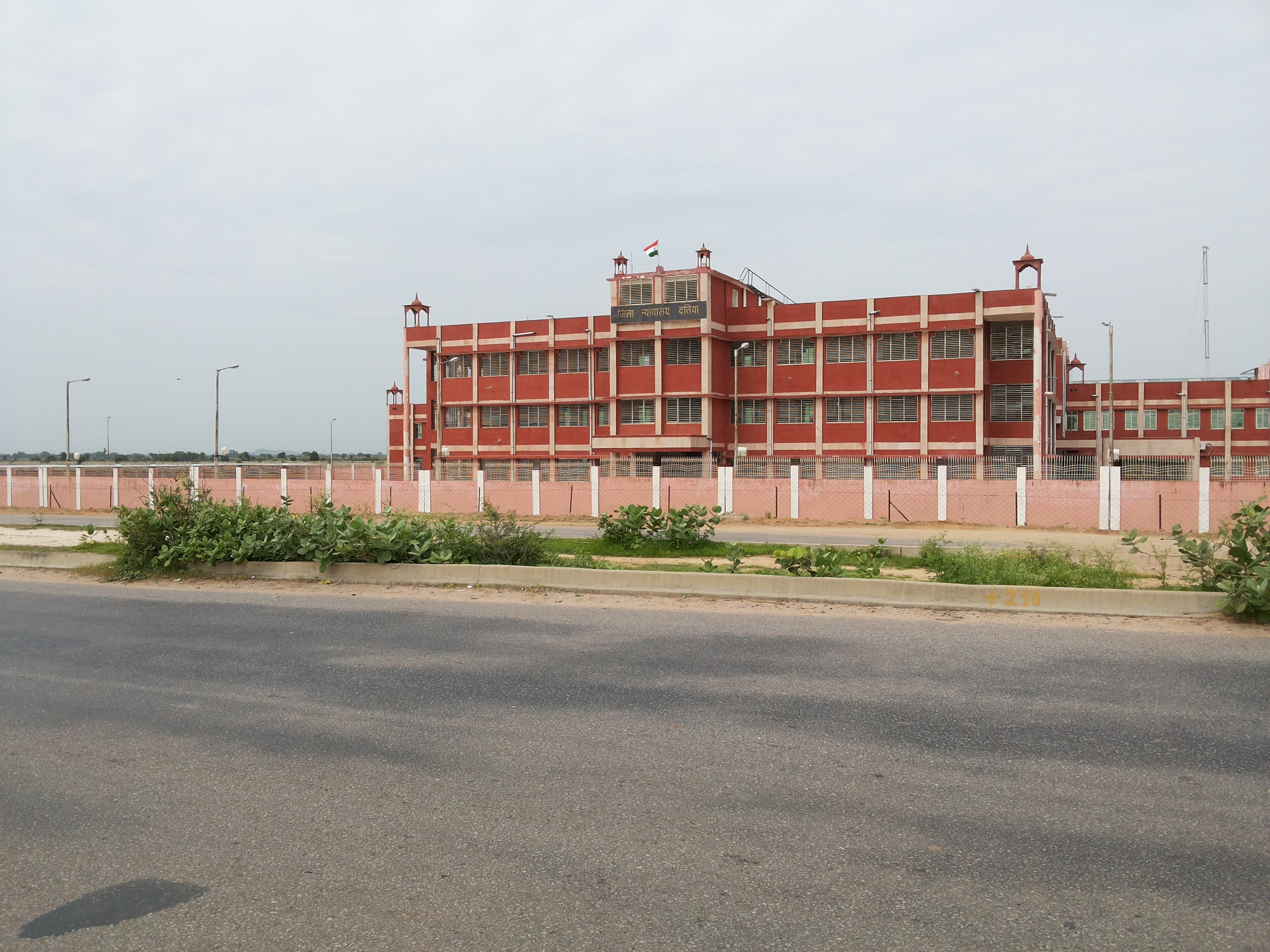
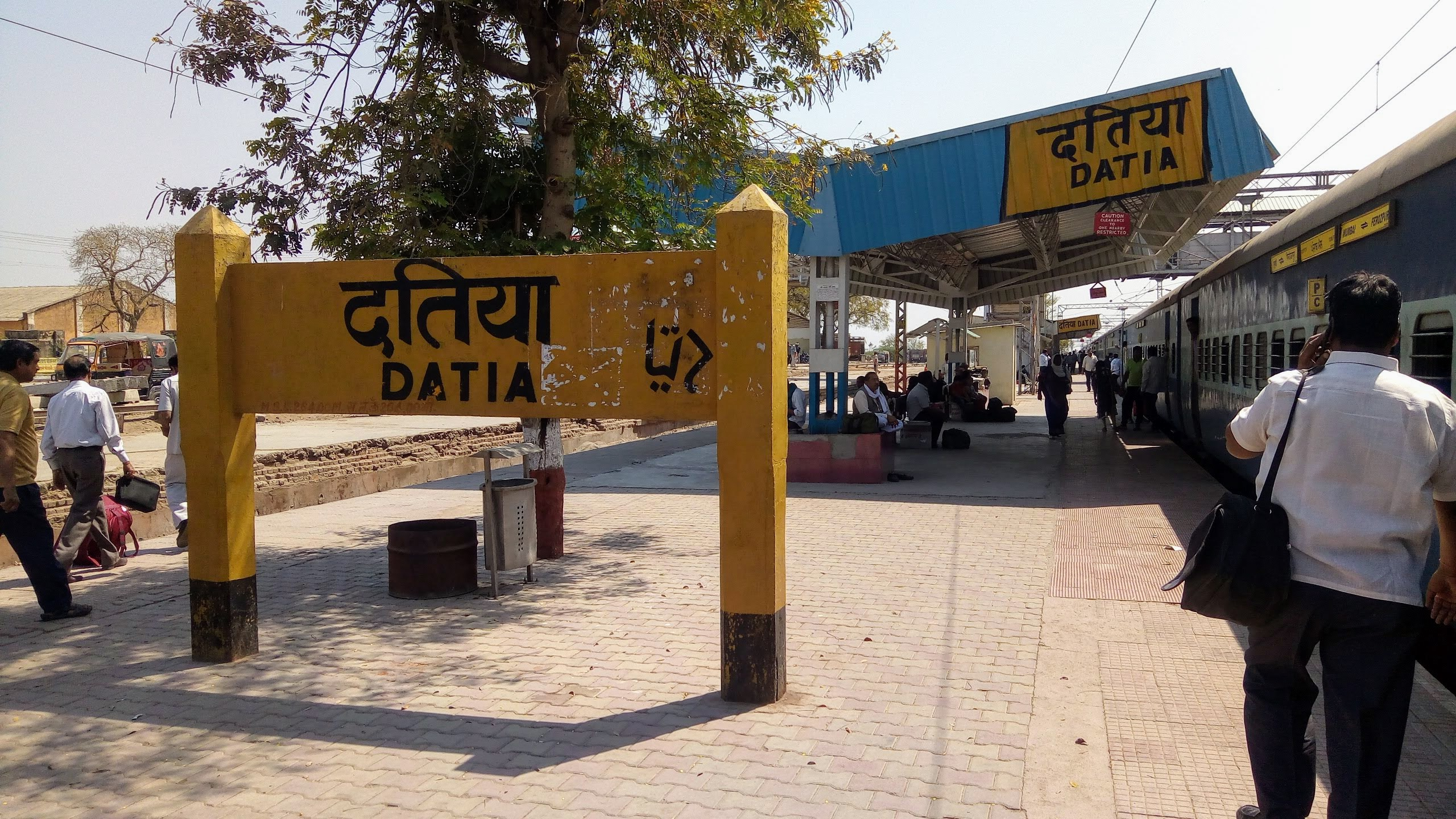
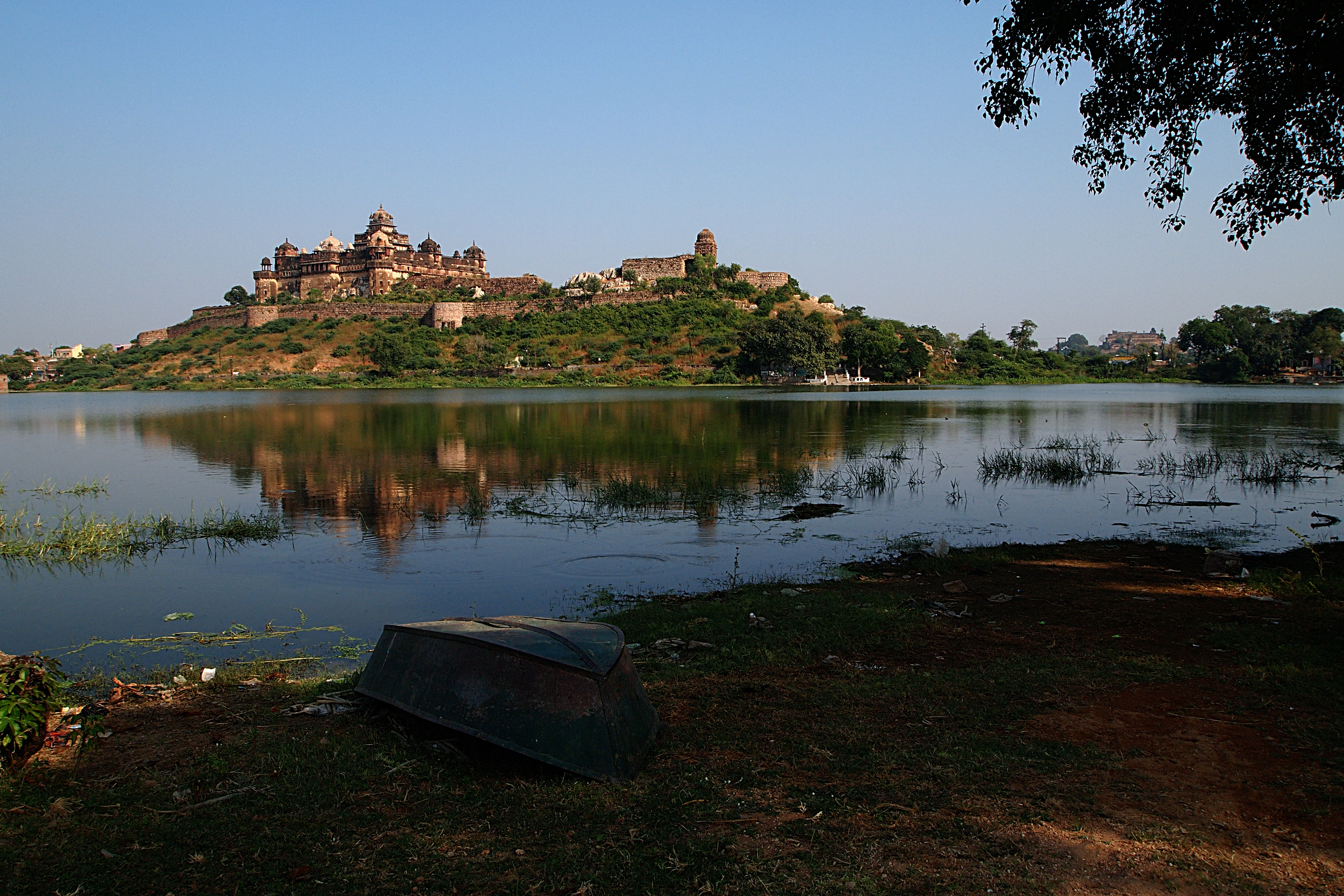
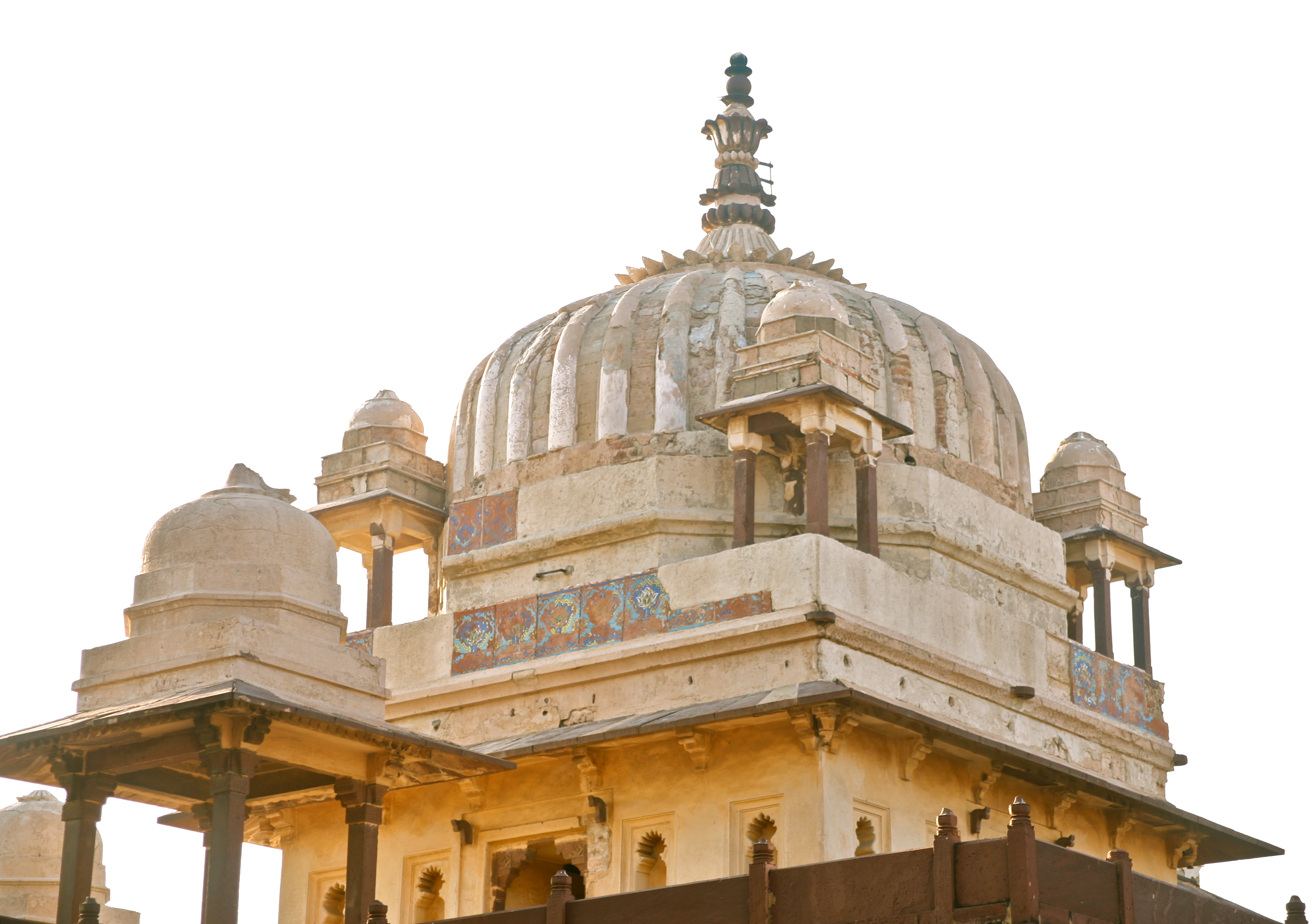
- Bir Singh Palace, District Court, Railway Station Datia

- Location within Madhya Pradesh Location within India
- Coordinates: 25.67°N 78.47°E
- Country: India
- State: Madhya Pradesh
- Division: Gwalior
- District: Datia
- Region: Gwalior Chambal
- Founder: Bundela Rajputs

Government
  - Body: Datia Municipality
- Elevation: 420 m (1,380 ft)

Population (2011)
  - Total: 100,466
  - Density: 292/km^{2} (760/sq mi)

Languages
  - Official: Hindi, Bundeli
- Time zone: UTC+5:30 (IST)
- PIN: 475661
- Telephone code: 917522
- ISO 3166 code: MP-IN
- Vehicle registration: MP-32
- Website: datia.nic.in

Datia is a city and the headquarters of the Datia District of Gwalior Chambal region in north Madhya Pradesh, Central India. Datia is famous for Pitambara Peeth, decidated to Maa Baglamukhi, a shakti pilgrimage site. It is an ancient town, mentioned in the Mahabharata and ruled by King Dantavakra. The city is 74 km from Gwalior, 441 km south of New Delhi, and 360 km north of Bhopal. About 13 km from Datia is Sonagir, a sacred Jain hill. Datia is also about 48 km from Orchha. The nearest airport is in Datia. It was former royal seat of the Bundela Rajputs, the Mughals and later to the Scindia dynasty during the British Raj. Datia is situated near Gwalior and on the border with Uttar Pradesh. Currently, in Datia.

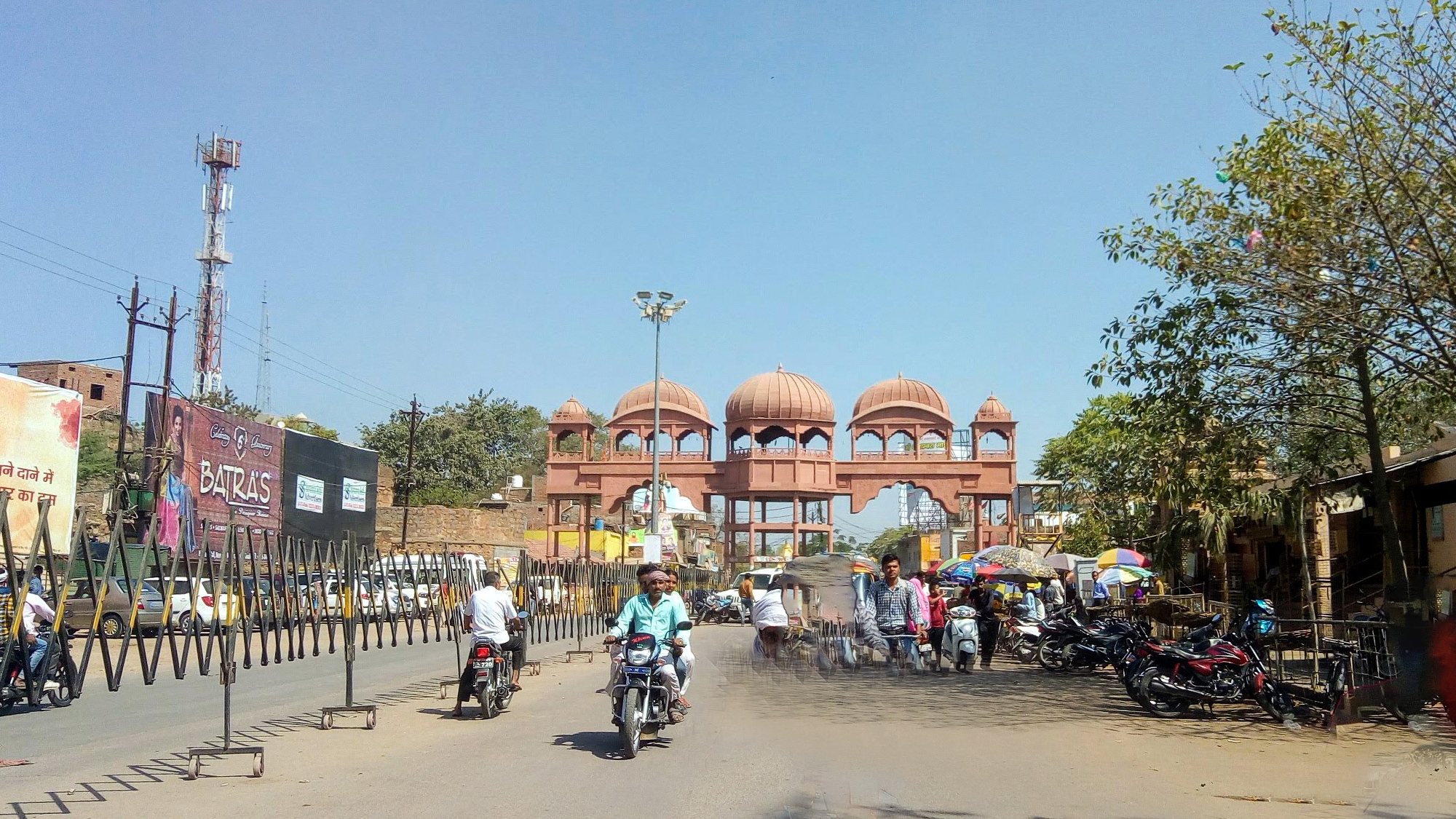
Datia town entrance, Madhya Pradesh

The old town is encircled by a stone wall and is home to gardens and palaces. The 17th-century palace of Bir Singh Ju Deo built in 1614 for the stay for his friend emperor Jehangir is a notable example of the Rajput - Mughal architecture of North India. It is the seven-story up and seven-story down palace commissioned by Raja Vir Singh Deo. Its symmetry and hilltop perch inspired Edwin Lutynes design for New Delhi. The town serves as a trading center for grains and cotton products. Handloom weaving is an important industry. The city is also a thriving pilgrimage spot for religious devotees. There are many temples, including the renowned Shaktipeeth of Pitambara Devi, Dhumavati Temple, Gupteshwar Temple and Laghu Vrindavan. Pitambara Peeth is a famous Shakta Pitha dedicated to Goddess Baglamukhi, one of the ten Mahavidyas (wisdom goddesses), known for her powers of stambhana (paralysis of enemies) and protection. The temple is located at the entrance of Datia town gate. The spot is located about 1 km from Datia Bus Station and 3 km from Datia Railway Station on the Delhi-Chennai main line. The Dhumavati Main Temple, established by Golokwasi Swamiji Maharaj and the Vankhandeshwar temple, a Mahabharat period temple of Shiva are also the main attraction of the place. It was ruled by Bundela Rajputs until 1947 as vassals to the Scindia dynasty.

== History ==
The state was founded in 1626 by Bundela Rajputs. Rao Bhagwan Rao, 1st Rao of Datia and Baroni 1626/1656, received Datia and Baroni from his father, Raja Bir Singh Deo of Orchha in 1626, and established his own state. After the Second Anglo-Maratha War, the state came under British control with other territories in Bundelkhand under the Treaty of Bassein in 1802. The ancient title of the ruling family was Rao, Raja and Maharaja, but in 1865 the British Government recognized only the title of Maharaja as hereditary. For the British, the State maintained a military force consisting of 945 cavalry, 5203 infantry, and 3 guns.

The motto of the royal family was Wir dalap Sharandah ("Lord of the Brave Army, Giver of Refuge"). In 1896–97, the state suffered from famine, and again to a lesser extent in 1899–1900. After India's independence in 1947, the Maharaja of Datia acceded the dominion of India, which later merged with the Union of India. Datia, together with the rest of the Bundelkhand agency, became part of the new state of Vindhya Pradesh in 1950. In 1956, the Vindhya Pradesh state was merged with certain other areas to form the state of Madhya Pradesh within the Union of India.

== Geography ==
Datia is located at 25.67°N 78.47°E. It has an average elevation of 302 metres (990 feet).

== Climate ==
Climate data for Datia (1991–2020, extremes 1970–present)
Month	Jan	Feb	Mar	Apr	May	Jun	Jul	Aug	Sep	Oct	Nov	Dec	Year
Record high °C (°F)	33.6 (92.5)	38.2 (100.8)	42.4 (108.3)	45.9 (114.6)	48.2 (118.8)	48.5 (119.3)	44.7 (112.5)	40.5 (104.9)	40.2 (104.4)	41.4 (106.5)	37.2 (99.0)	34.0 (93.2)	48.5 (119.3)
Mean daily maximum °C (°F)	22.8 (73.0)	26.7 (80.1)	33.5 (92.3)	39.5 (103.1)	43.0 (109.4)	40.8 (105.4)	34.9 (94.8)	33.1 (91.6)	33.5 (92.3)	34.0 (93.2)	30.0 (86.0)	25.4 (77.7)	33.0 (91.4)
Mean daily minimum °C (°F)	6.9 (44.4)	10.5 (50.9)	15.3 (59.5)	20.9 (69.6)	26.9 (80.4)	28.0 (82.4)	25.9 (78.6)	24.8 (76.6)	23.3 (73.9)	17.7 (63.9)	12.0 (53.6)	8.1 (46.6)	18.5 (65.3)
Record low °C (°F)	0.3 (32.5)	0.0 (32.0)	5.5 (41.9)	10.8 (51.4)	18.5 (65.3)	19.0 (66.2)	19.4 (66.9)	20.5 (68.9)	15.0 (59.0)	8.8 (47.8)	5.4 (41.7)	0.4 (32.7)	0.0 (32.0)
Average rainfall mm (inches)	8.0 (0.31)	10.8 (0.43)	9.4 (0.37)	5.9 (0.23)	8.3 (0.33)	92.4 (3.64)	234.7 (9.24)	272.6 (10.73)	131.3 (5.17)	20.1 (0.79)	7.3 (0.29)	2.7 (0.11)	803.4 (31.63)
Average rainy days	0.7	0.9	0.7	0.9	1.0	4.6	11.8	12.3	6.2	1.3	0.5	0.4	41.1
Average relative humidity (%) (at 17:30 IST)	58	51	39	32	30	45	71	76	69	53	50	56	53
Source: India Meteorological Department

== Demographics ==
Religions in Datia (2011)
Religion	Percent
Hindus	87.13%
Muslims	11.62%
Buddhists	0.60%

As of the 2011 India census, Datia had a population of 100,466. Males constitute 53% of the population and females 47%. Datia has an average literacy rate of 68%, higher than the national average of 59.5%: male literacy is 75% and female literacy is 60%. In Datia, 15% of the population is under six years of age.

== Sites of interest ==
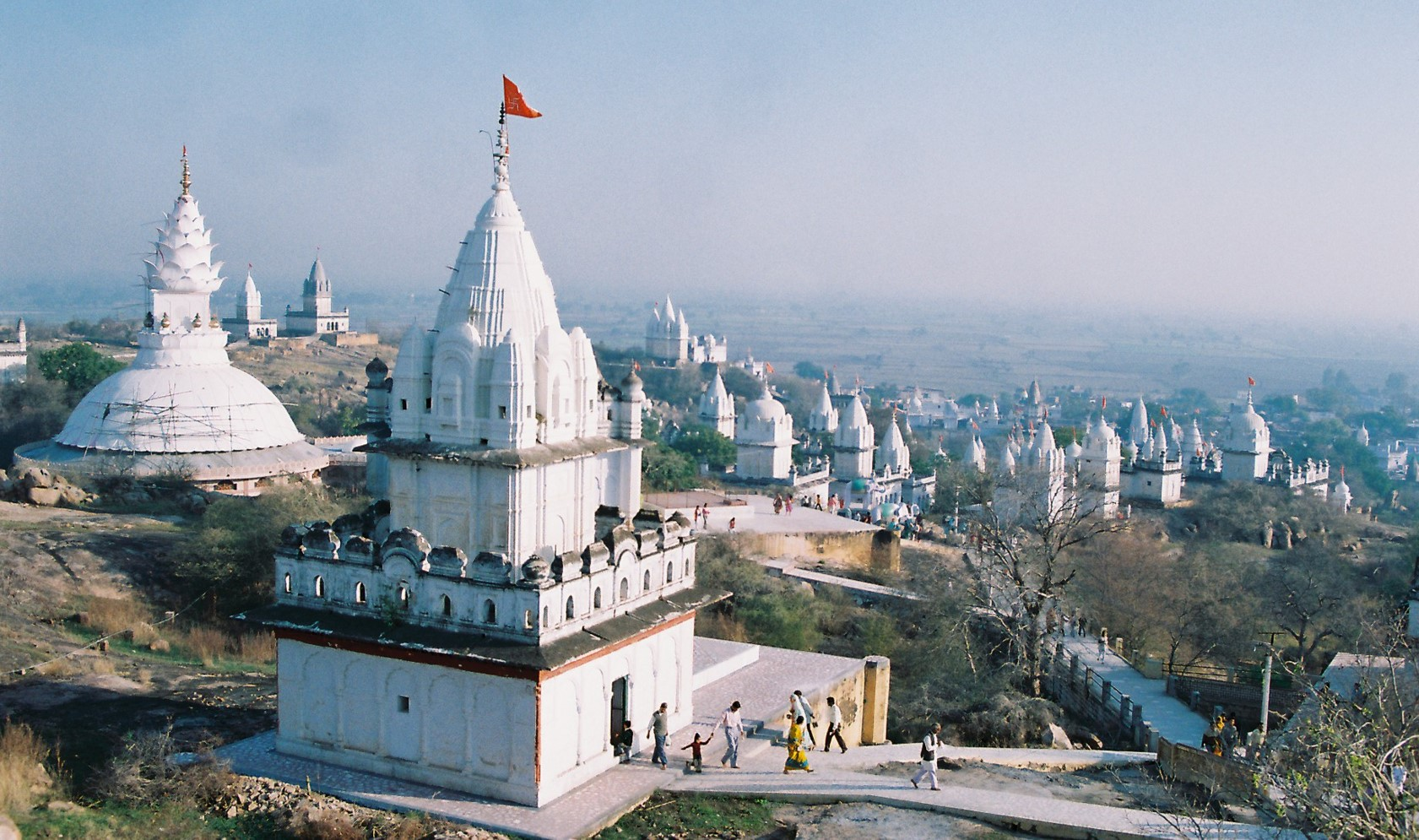
Sonagiri Badoni

Datia is best known for the Pitambara Peeth, a famous Shakta pitha located at the entrance of Datia. This pilgrimage spot features Bagalamukhi Devi Temple and Dhumavati Mai Temple, established by Shri Golokwasi Swamiji Maharaj. Vankhandeshwar, a Mahabharat period temple of God Shiva, is also situated here. A temple of the goddess Peetaambara Bagalamukhi, located 12 km from datia and Shri Siddheshwar mahadev temple in village Kurthara located 20 km from Datia.

White marble Jain temples are located at Sonagiri. Bajni Shila and Nariyal Kund named divine place are located there. Sonagiri is located 18 km from Datia and is well connected by road and train.

Datia Palace, Datia Town also very famous for Temples and Forts. The founder of the Datia State in Bundelkhand - Maharaj Birsingh Deo Build many such 52 monuments all around the country. Datia Palace is also known as Satkhanda Palace, Datia Mahal, and Purana Mahal or the "Old Palace".

== Education ==
Government and Private Colleges:

- Makhanlal Chaturvedi National University of Journalism and Communication, Datia
- Government Medical College, Datia
- PG Government College, Datia
- Government Polytechnic College, Datia
- Government Girls College, Datia
- Government Law College, Datia
- Shri Rawatpura Sarkar Institute of Technology & Science (SRITS)
- Nagaji Institute of Technology & Management (NITM)
- Shri Swamiji Maharaj College of Education and Science
- Advance College of Pharmacy
- Shanti College of Pharmacy

Government and Private Schools:

- Kendriya Vidyalaya Datia
- Government Higher Secondary School No. 2 Datia
- Holy Cross Ashram School
- Shree Kherapati Sarkar Public School Indergarh
- Rani Laxmibai Public School
- Academic Heights Public School (APHS)
- Aspirant International School
- Bachpan A Play School
- Shri Rawatpura Sarkar Shanti International Public School
- Little Flower International School
- Sai International School
- St. Kolbe's School
- Lord Krishna Public School
- Bright Morning Public School

== Transportation ==
Datia is well Connected with roadways, railways and airways.

Datia railway station is the main railway station of the town. Its station code is DAA. Many train halts in the station. It is located on Gwalior-Jhansi mainline section. The station consists of five platforms. Passenger, MEMU, Express, and Superfast trains stop at the station.

The following trains stop at Datia railway station in both directions:

- Malwa Express
- Mumbai CST Amritsar Express
- Jabalpur–H.Nizamuddin Express
- Mahakoshal Express
- Dakshin Express
- Jhansi–Bandra Terminus Express
- Kalinga Utkal Express
- Bundelkhand Express
- Hirakud Express
- Chambal Express
- Howrah–Mathura Chambal Express
- Punjab Mail
- Chhattisgarh Express
- Barauni–Gwalior Mail
- Taj Express
- Khajuraho–Udaipur City Express
- Jhelum Express

Datia Airport opened on 31 May 2025 and was inaugurated virtually by Prime Minister of India, Narendra Modi, from Bhopal. Datia has direct flights connecting to Raja Bhoj Airport in Bhopal and Khajuraho Airport.
