= Sonagiri =

Jain pilgrimage site in Gwalior, Madhya Pradesh, India

Sonagiri Jain Tirth
- सोनागिरी (Hindi); Shri Digamber Jain Siddha Shetra Sonagiri
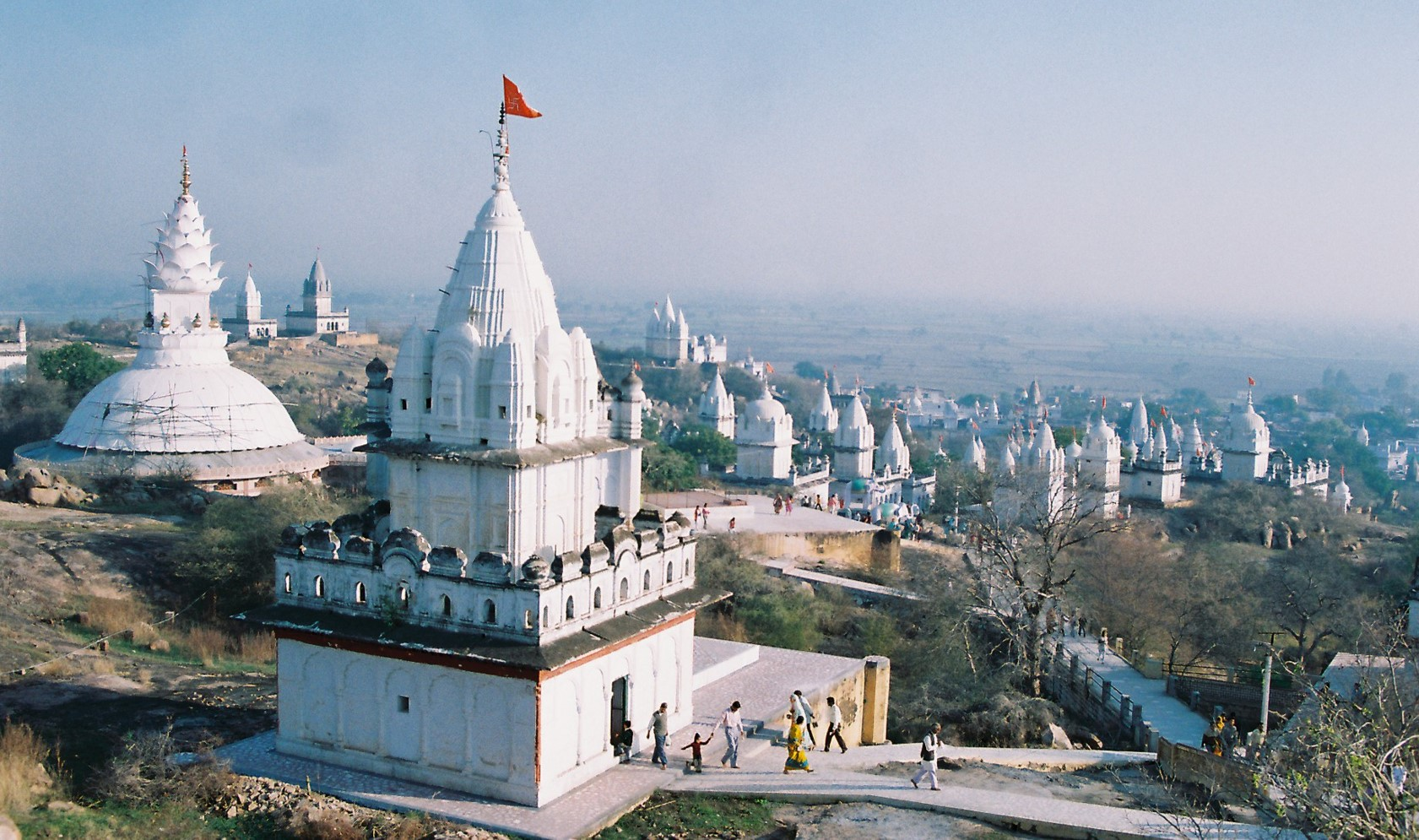
- Sonagiri Jain Tirth

- Location within Madhya Pradesh

Religion
- Affiliation: Jainism
- Sect: Digambara
- Deity: Chandraprabhu
- Festival: Mahavir Jayanti
- Governing body: Shri Dig. Jain Siddha Shetra Sonagiri Samrakshini Committee

Location
- Location: Datia, Madhya Pradesh

Architecture
- Established: 9th century
- Temple: 103

Sonagiri (Hindi: सोनागिरी) or Swarnagiri, about 65 km from Gwalior, has scores of Digambar Jain temples dating from the 9th century onwards. It is located in the Datia district of Madhya Pradesh, India. This location is popular among devotees and ascetic saints to practice self-discipline, and austerity and to attain Moksha (salvation or liberation). It also has a Jain museum.

== Etymology ==
In Hindi, Sonagiri means a mountain ('giri') of gold ('sona').

== Approach ==
Sonagiri can be accessed via the Dabra-Datia Road. This also lies on the Gwalior-Jhansi Road. Sonagiri Railway Station lies on the Agra-Jhansi rail line.

== Jain tradition ==
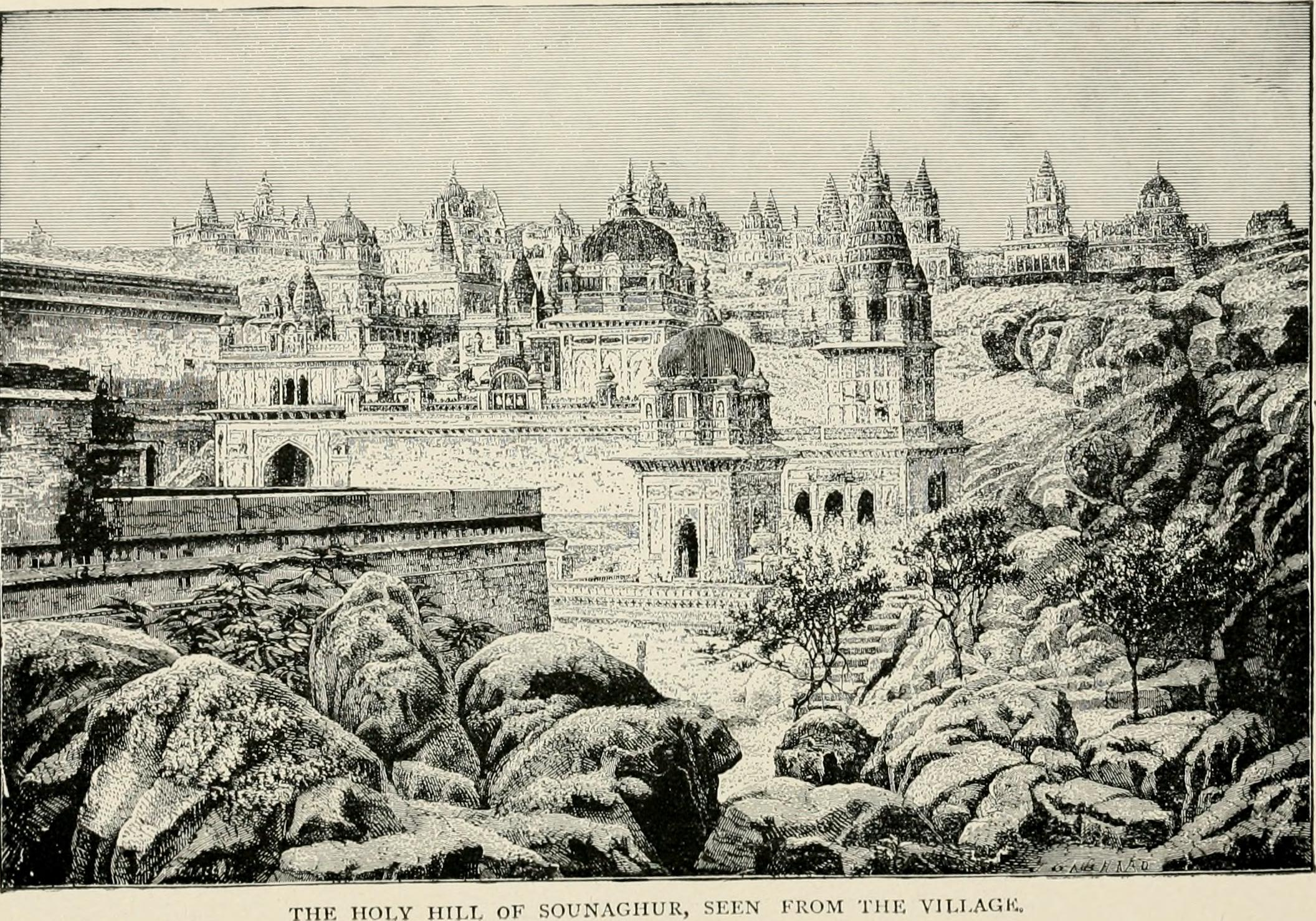
Jain Temples on Sonagiri Hill, wood-engraving of 1899

Sonagiri, a Siddha-Kṣetra, is considered one of the most important Jain Tirtha (pilgrimage site).

According to Jain texts, since the time of Chandraprabhu (the 8th Teerthankar), five and a half crores of ascetic saints have achieved moksha (liberation) here. The place is considered sacred by devotees. There is a 3 metres (9.8 ft) rock cut image of Chandraprabhu dating back to the 5th to 6th century. There are a total of 103 temples with 77 on the hill and 26 in the village. The Samavsharan of Bhagwan Chandraprabhu came here seventeen times. According to Jain belief, King Nanganang along with half a million followers attained moksha. Nang, Anang, Chintagati, Poornachand, Ashoksen, Shridatta, Swarnbhadra and many other saints achieved salvation here.

This is a unique place known as Laghu Sammed Shikhar covering the area of 132 acres of two hills. Sonagiri also had a Bhattaraka seat and following the death of Bhaṭṭāraka Candrabhūṣaṇa the seat became defunct in the late twentieth century. A number of Bhattarakapada-sthāpnā manuscripts were also composed here.

== Architecture ==
There is a total of 77 temples on the hill. Each temple is white in colour and features a high spire. The temple number 57 is the main temple in Sonagiri. Acharya Shubh Chandra and Bhartrihari lived and worked here for spiritual achievements. Like Kundalpur, Girnar Jain temples, Dilwara temples and Shikharji, the Sonagiri temple complex is known for its rich architecture.

== Main Temple and Idol ==
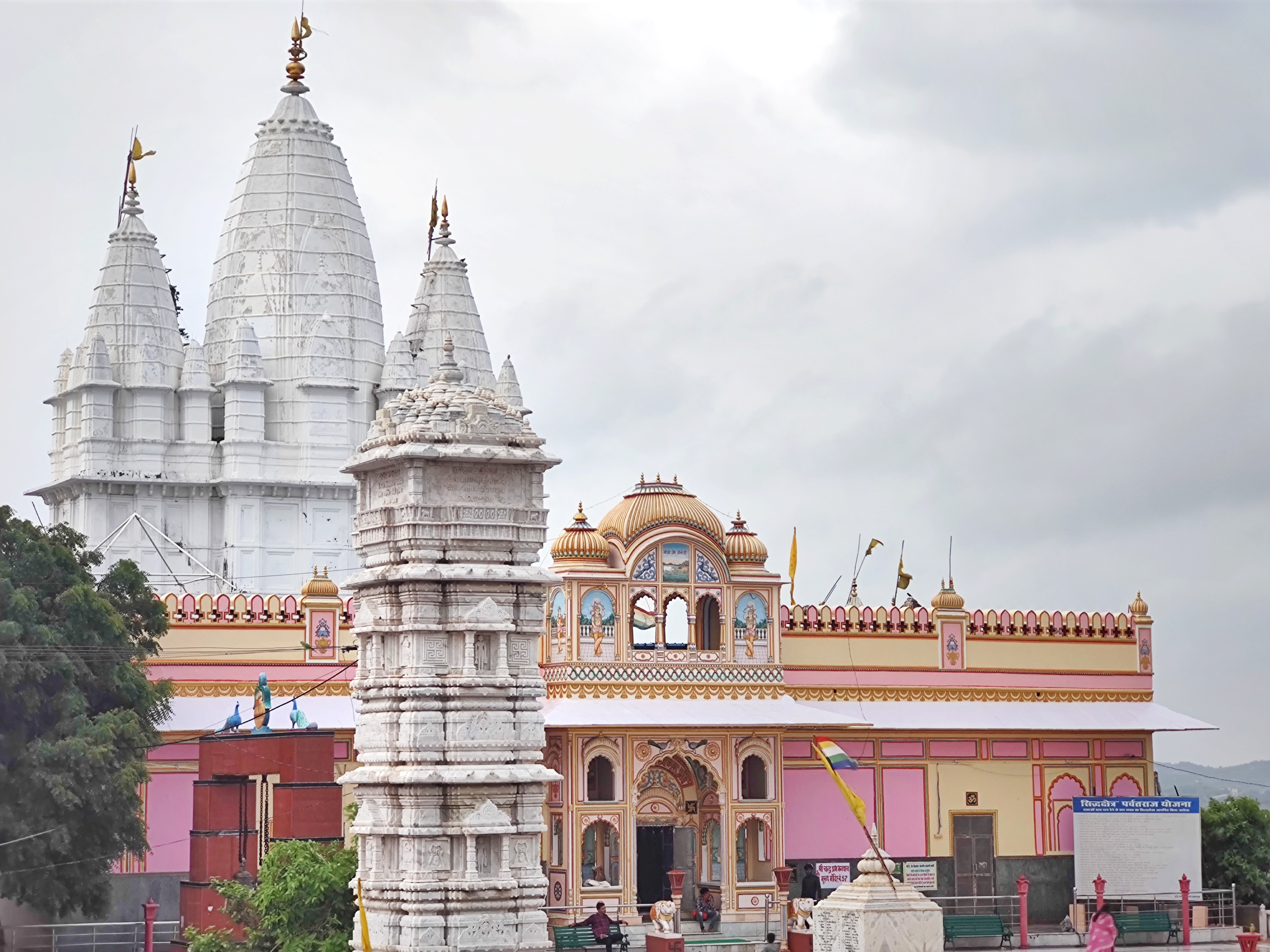
Chandraprabha temple, Sonagiri

The temple Number 57 is the main temple. This is vast in size and possesses an attractive artistic spire. In this temple, the principal deity is an 11 feet (3.4 m) idol of Chandraprabha popularly known as Bade Baba. There are two vedis (altars) with an idol of Sheetalnath and Parsvanatha on either side of the main vedi. The temple also includes a 43 feet (13 m) manastambha (transl. column of honour) and a model of Samavasarana.

The Samavasarana temple enshrines a sculptural representation of Samavasarana. The sculpture features moulding at the base supported by three circular tiers surmounted by a square pavilion and enshrines a chaumukha (four-faced) image of a Jina at the centre.

The temple is popular among Jain devotees and was also visited by former US president Bill Clinton and European presidents.

=== Fair ===
A ratha yatra is organised here after Holi from Chaitra Pratipada to Rang Panchami. An annual 'flag hoisting' ceremony is also organised, on this occasion the old flag of the spire is replaced with a new golden coloured flag.

== Gallery ==
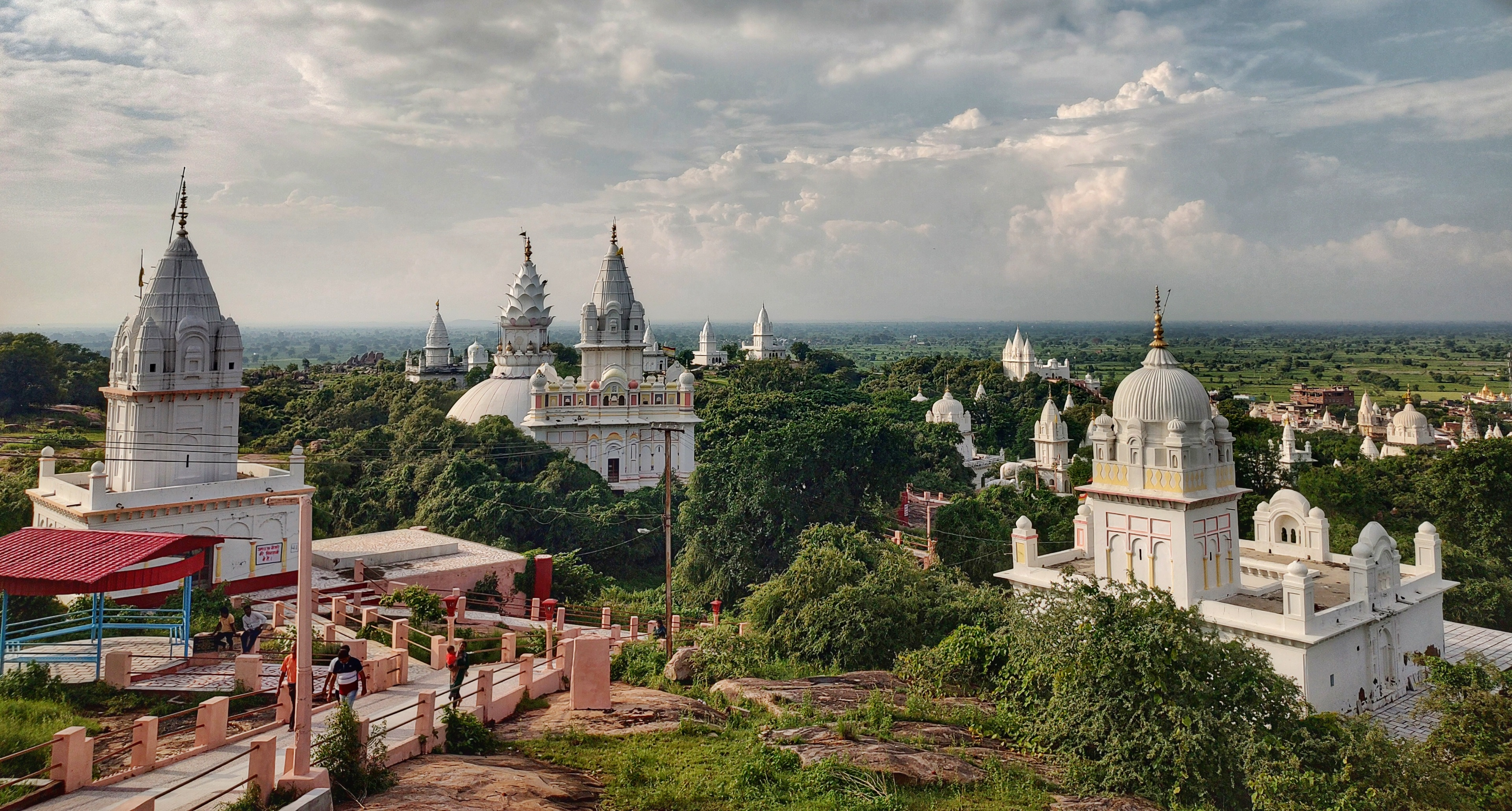
Jain temples, Sonagiri hill

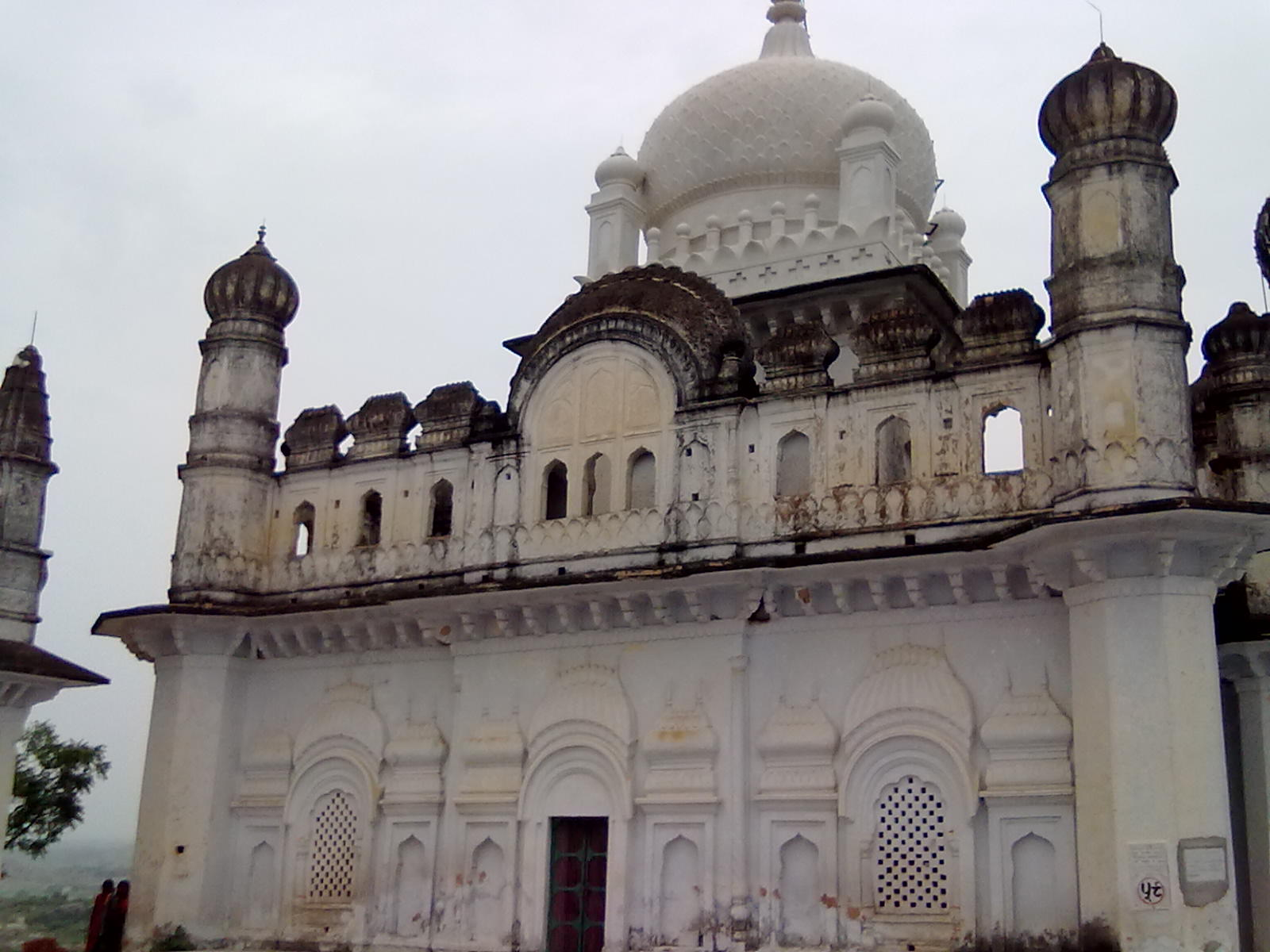
Sonagiri Jain temple

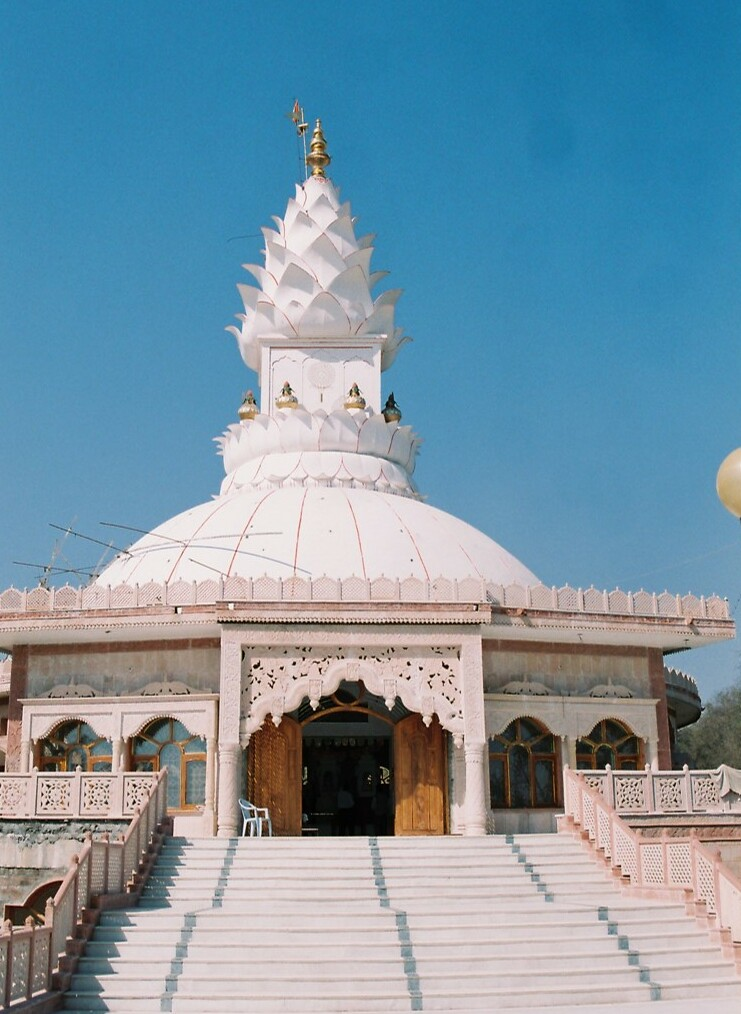
Nandishwar temple, Sonagiri

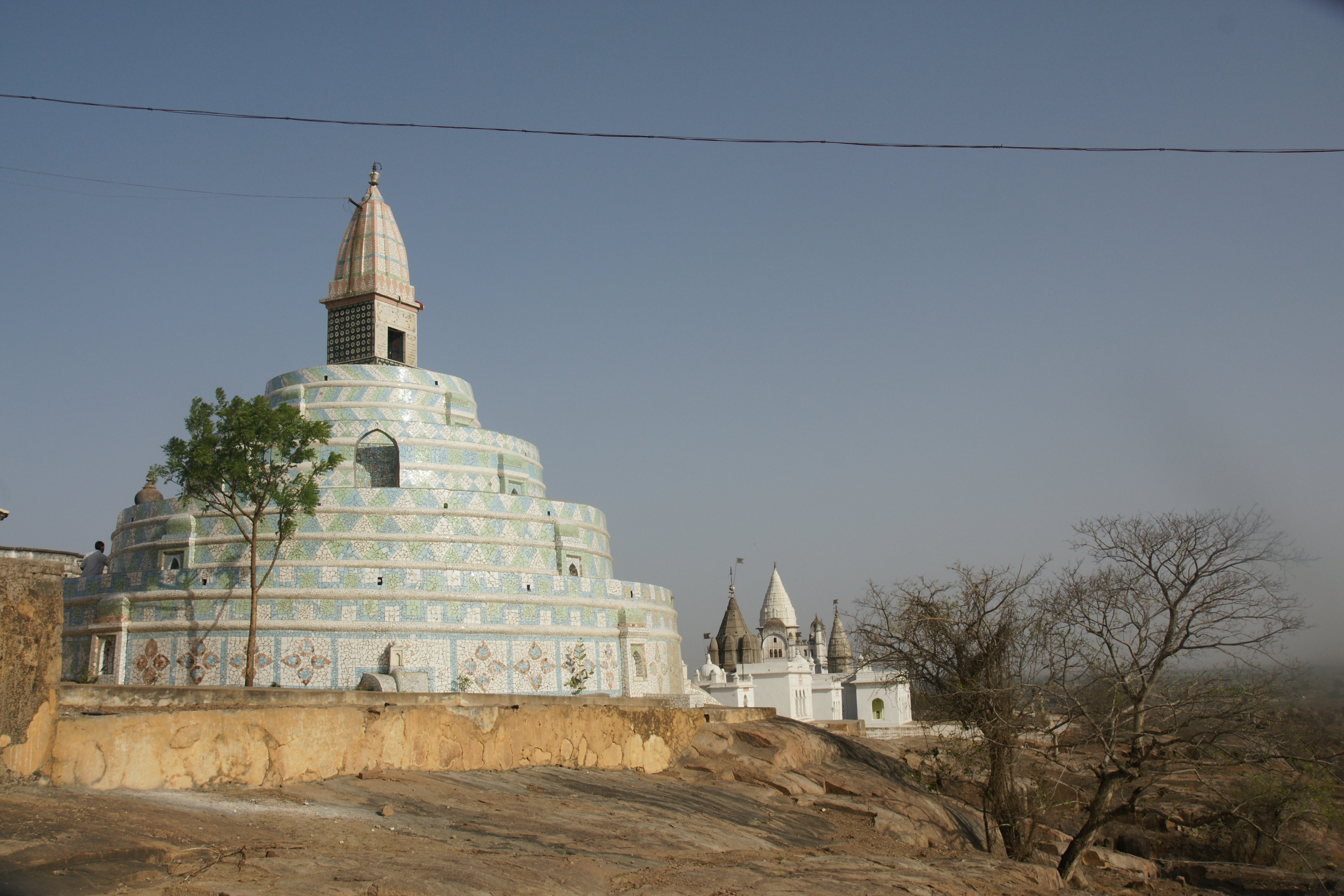
Samavsharan temple

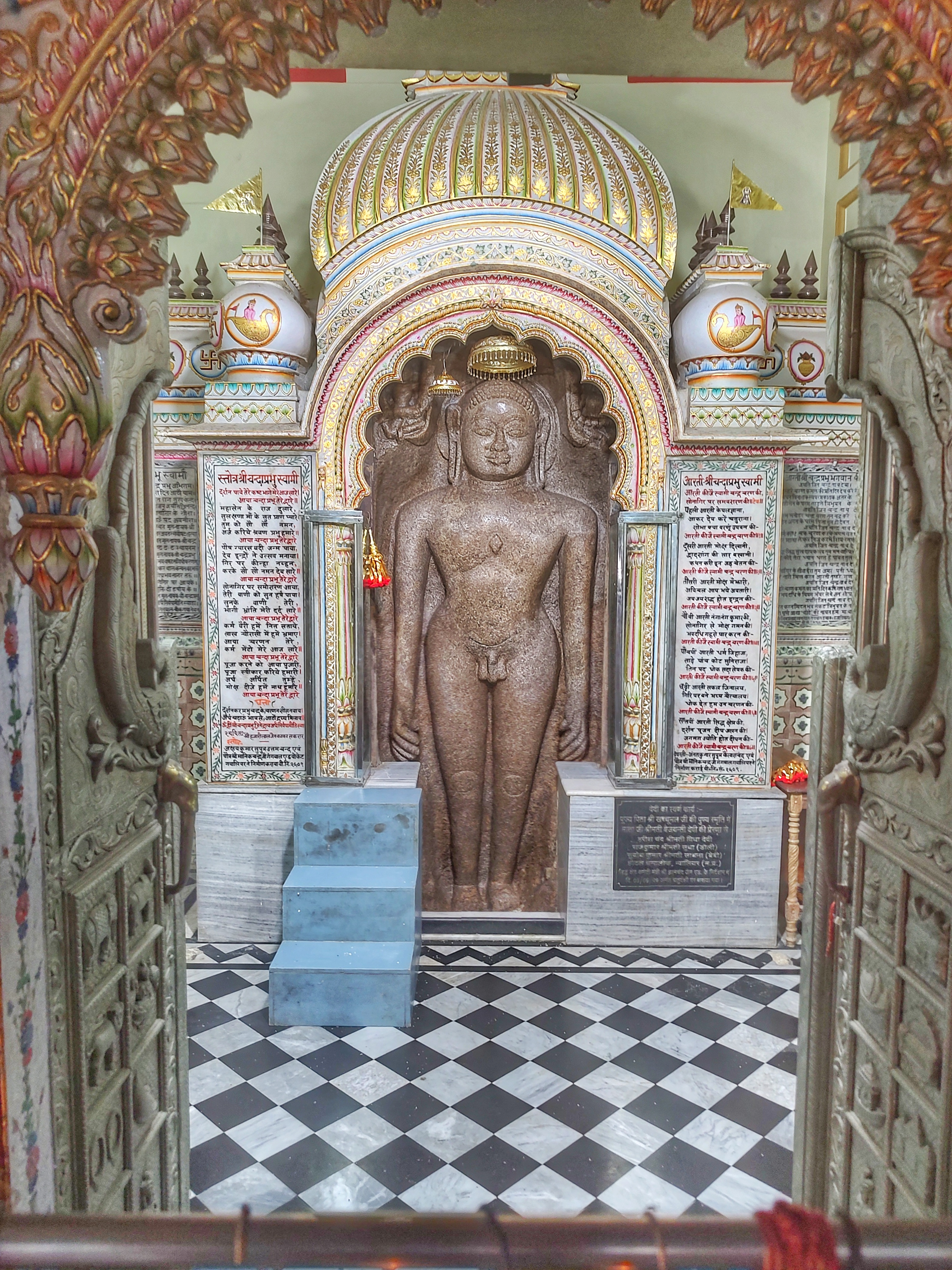
The image of Chandraprabhu inside the main temple

== See also ==
- Muktagiri
- Gopachal Hill
