= Pahuj River =

River in India

Coordinates: 26°25′N 79°10′E

Pahuj River is a river flowing through the city of Jhansi, Uttar Pradesh, India. It has been referred as the Pushpavati in religious texts. It is a small and dry river which passes through the Indian Grassland and Fodder Research Institute, Jhansi.

It flows through the region of Bundelkhand region and plays a major part in dividing the border of Uttar Pradesh and Madhya Pradesh. Generally it flows at a heavy water level outside its banks in the monsoon season but drastically can also go dry or with very little flow in the summers.

Nowadays many electric plants in Uttar pradesh are discharging its waste in it due to which the water of the river getting contaminated day by day and also illegal mining at the banks of it is causing its state deteriorating day by day. The river is approx 195 km from its origin to mouth. But it is dry for most part. However, in 2024, the Pahuj river remained in spate for three days.

The then Union Water Resources Minister Uma Bharti adopted the Pahuj river in 2014, but it is fighting for its existence as huge water hyacinth weed and dumping of other untreated sewage. Many encroachments on the banks too are harming the river.

== Sources ==
It originates near the hills of Jhansi or in Tikamgarh district of Madhya Pradesh. It is a tributary of the Sindh River, which joins the Yamuna River in Etawah, just after the Chambal River confluence with the Yamuna river. At Pachnada, the Sindh River meets four other rivers,- Yamuna, Chambal, Kunwari and Pahuj, in a rare spectacle.

== Pahuj Reservoir ==
=== Geography and Technical Specifications ===
The Pahuj Reservoir is a multipurpose man-made water body situated on the Pahuj River, approximately 5 km west of Jhansi city. Officially commissioned in 1909, the reservoir serves as a critical resource for the region, providing water for irrigation, fisheries, and serving as a source of drinking water for the local population. Geographically, it is located at an altitude of 272 m above mean sea level at coordinates 25°29'49.97"N and 78°31'45.01"E.

The reservoir structure measures 2,040 m in length and 10.67 m in height, with a total catchment area of 310.80 km². It is characterized by steep hill slopes on three sides and an artificial blockade on the fourth. At full reservoir level (FRL), it covers a water spread area of 543 hectares (reaching 55 hectares at dead storage level) and maintains a gross storage capacity of 18.25 million cubic meters (MCM). The water chemistry is significantly influenced by seasonal variations, with major ion concentrations typically peaking during the pre-monsoon season due to atmospheric precipitation and the weathering of local phosphate-carbonate rocks. Due to the construction of Pahuj dam near Jhansi, the river has increased its water level.
