= Bagalamukhi Temple, Himachal Pradesh =

Hindu temple of goddess Bagalamukhi in Bankhandi, India

Maa Baglamukhi Mandir
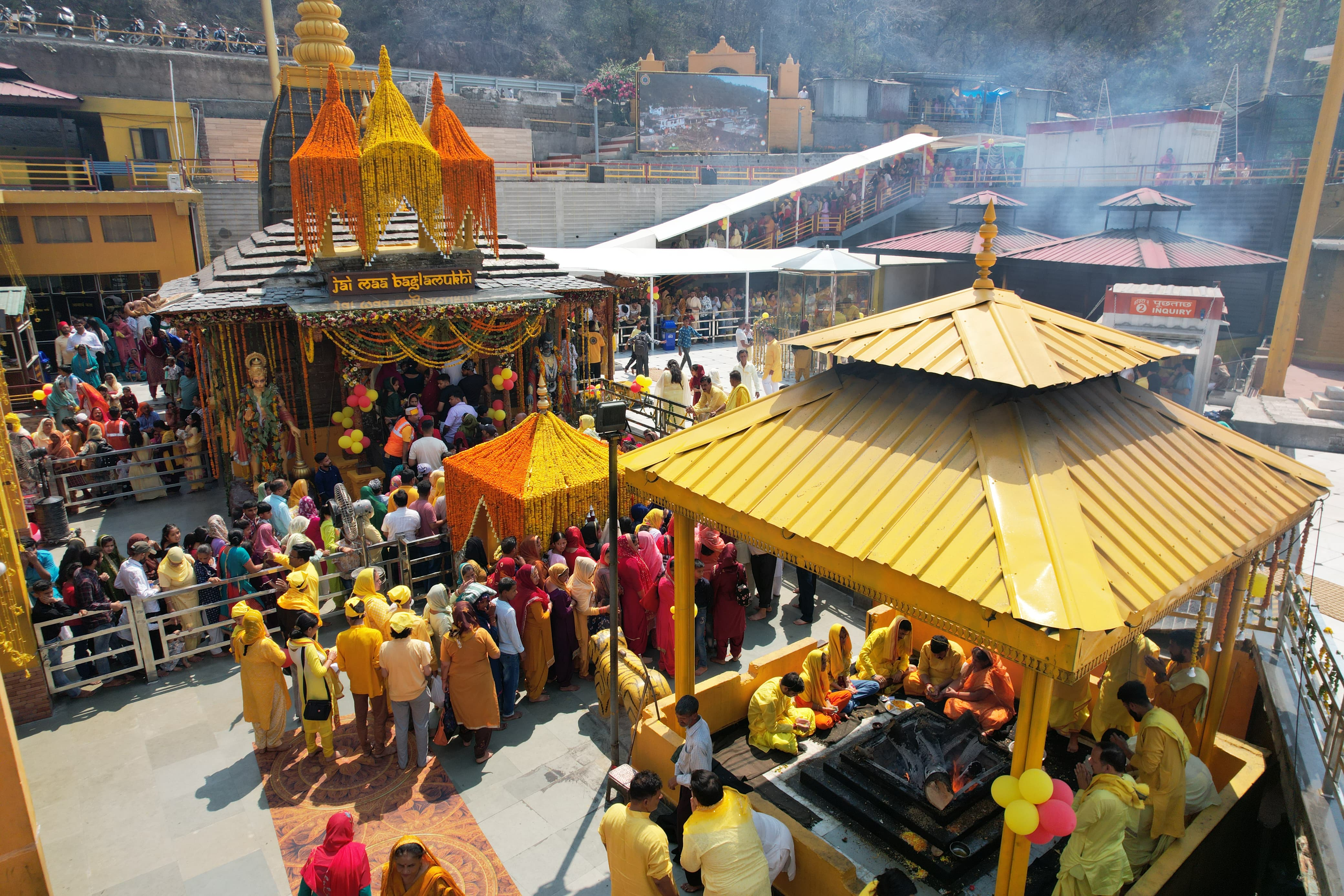
- Temple of Mata Baglamukhi in Bankhandi, Kangra

- Location of the temple Bagalamukhi Temple, Himachal Pradesh (India)

Religion
- Affiliation: Hinduism
- Deity: Bagalamukhi
- Festival: Navratri

Location
- Location: Bankhandi
- State: Himachal Pradesh
- Country: India
- Coordinates: 31.968°N 76.207°E

Website
- maabaglamukhiofficial.org

The Bagalamukhi Temple (Anjna Mata Temple) is a Hindu temple located in Bankhandi, Kangra district of Himachal Pradesh, India. It is dedicated to the Hindu goddess Bagalamukhi, one of the ten Tantric Mahavidya goddesses. The goddess, also known as Peetambhara, is associated with the colour yellow. She is depicted seated on a golden throne with pillars decorated with jewels and has three eyes, symbolising her ability to grant ultimate knowledge to her devotees.

== Religious significance ==
The temple is especially popular during the Hindu goddess-centric festival of Navaratri. It is one of three historically significant shrines dedicated to Bagalamukhi in India, the others being the Pitambara Peeth in Datia and the Bagalamukhi Temple in Nalkheda.

It is believed that worshipping goddess Bagalamukhi at this temple enhances one's power and weakens one's enemies, rendering them powerless. This highlights her role as a divine protector and a formidable force against adversities.

== Legend ==
According to Hindu legend, Rama, guided by Hanuman, worshipped goddess Bagalamukhi here to gain victory over the demon king Ravana. The goddess granted Rama the divine weapon Brahmastra, symbolising the triumph of good over evil. The temple houses a sacred fire pit (Havan Kund), where Rama is believed to have performed a havan to seek her blessings.

== Visits by Notable Devotees ==
Several notable personalities have visited the temple to seek the blessings of Maa Baglamukhi.

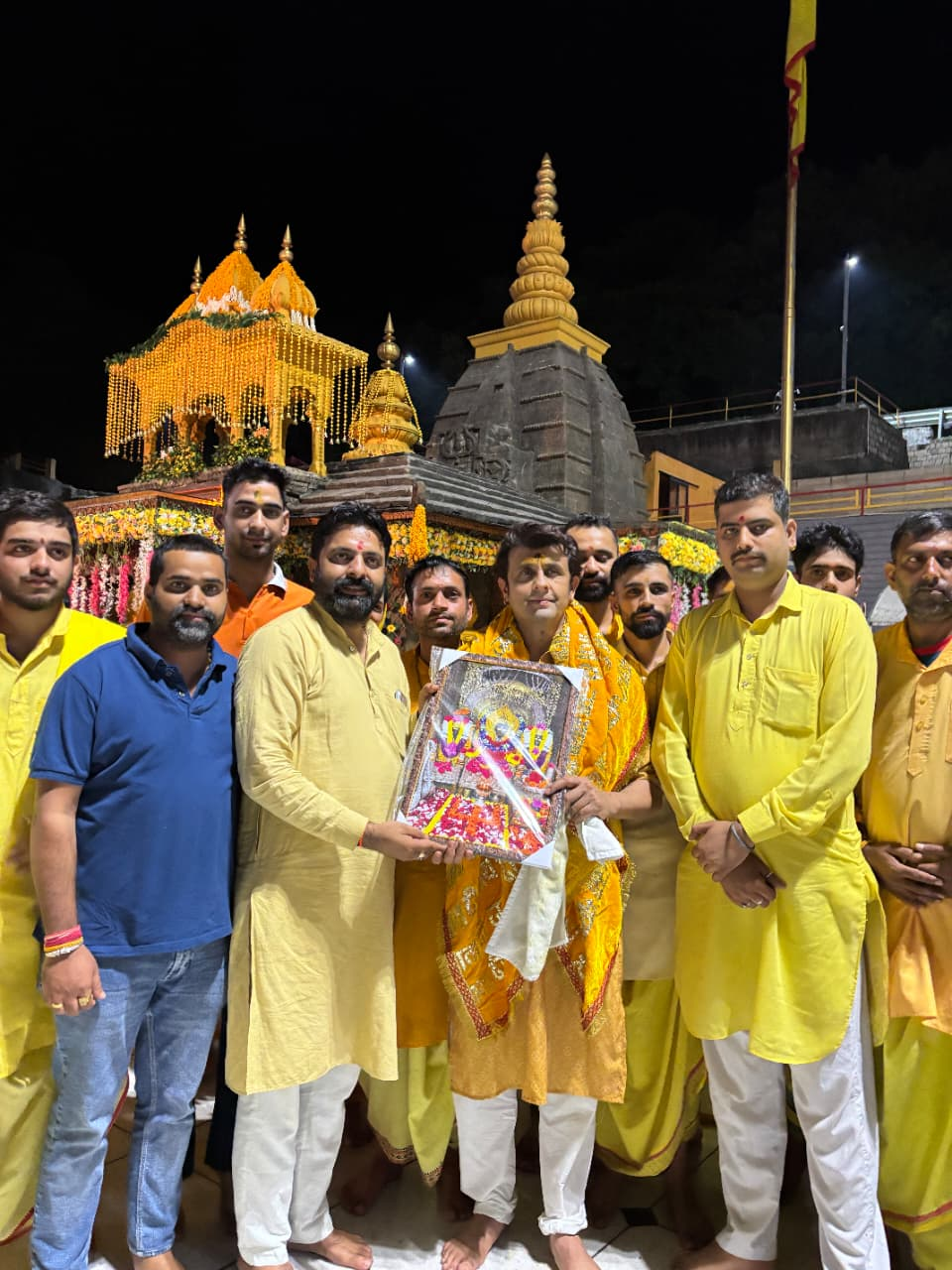
Singer Sonu Nigam visiting Maa Baglamukhi Mandir, Bankhandi

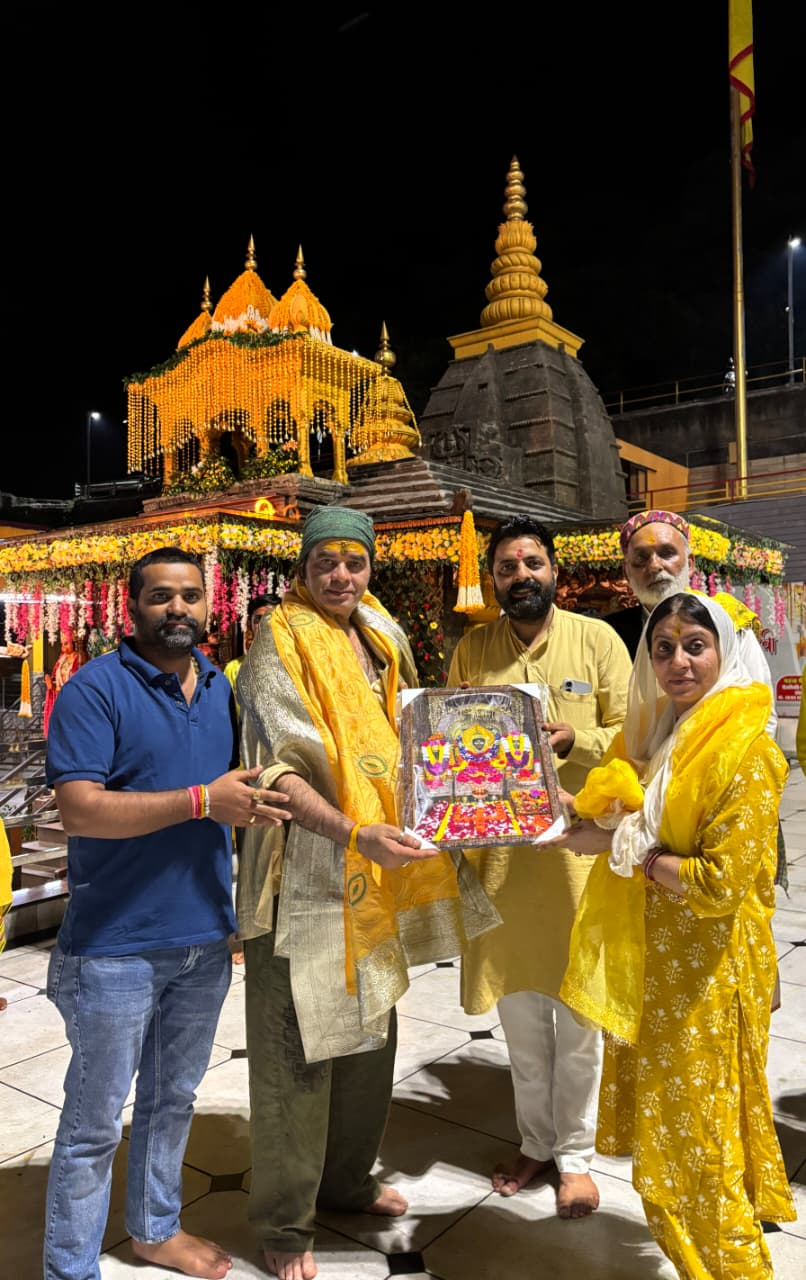
Singer Mohit Chauhan visiting Maa Baglamukhi Mandir, Bankhandi
