= Shree Swami ji of Pitambara Peeth =

Shree Swami Ji Of Peetamabara Peetha was a Hindu ascetic who lived for most part of his life(??-1979) at the temple complex of Pitambara Peeth of Datia, in the Madhya Pradesh state of the central India.

His real name is not known. There is a saying about him that he is from Uttar Pradesh, India. There is no knowledge with certainty about his birth, community, native place and other information nor did he reveal it to any one symbolizing the greatest sort of sacrifice (a practice very common within Indian Ascetics). He was a devotee of the Goddess Bagalamukhi and is said to have performed a great many miracles for his devotees and others. He stopped in Datia on 9 July 1929 after a nationwide journey. He then established the main deity, Bhagwati Baglamukhi, in 1935 and observed penance for a period of 50 years until he left his earthly body (samadhi) on 2 June 1979, this time period was marked by a large number of events that showed his extraordinary knowledge way far over and above any intellectual human capacities. He is also famously remembered for the organization of the Brahm Yagna, a vaidik ritual which is believed to be performed on earth after Yudhishthir. His affection for the country was openly observed during the Sino-Indian War of 1962 to save India from a foreign attack. Shree Swami Ji Maharaj was a scholar of music. Shastriya Sangeet or the Eastern music was well known to him. He presented the real form of Shakt Sadhana before the world. He was well versed in Vedas and upnishads.
