= Dhumavati =

Hindu Tantric widow goddess

- Goddess of strife, loneliness, unfulfilled desires and inauspicious things
- Member of The Ten Mahavidyas
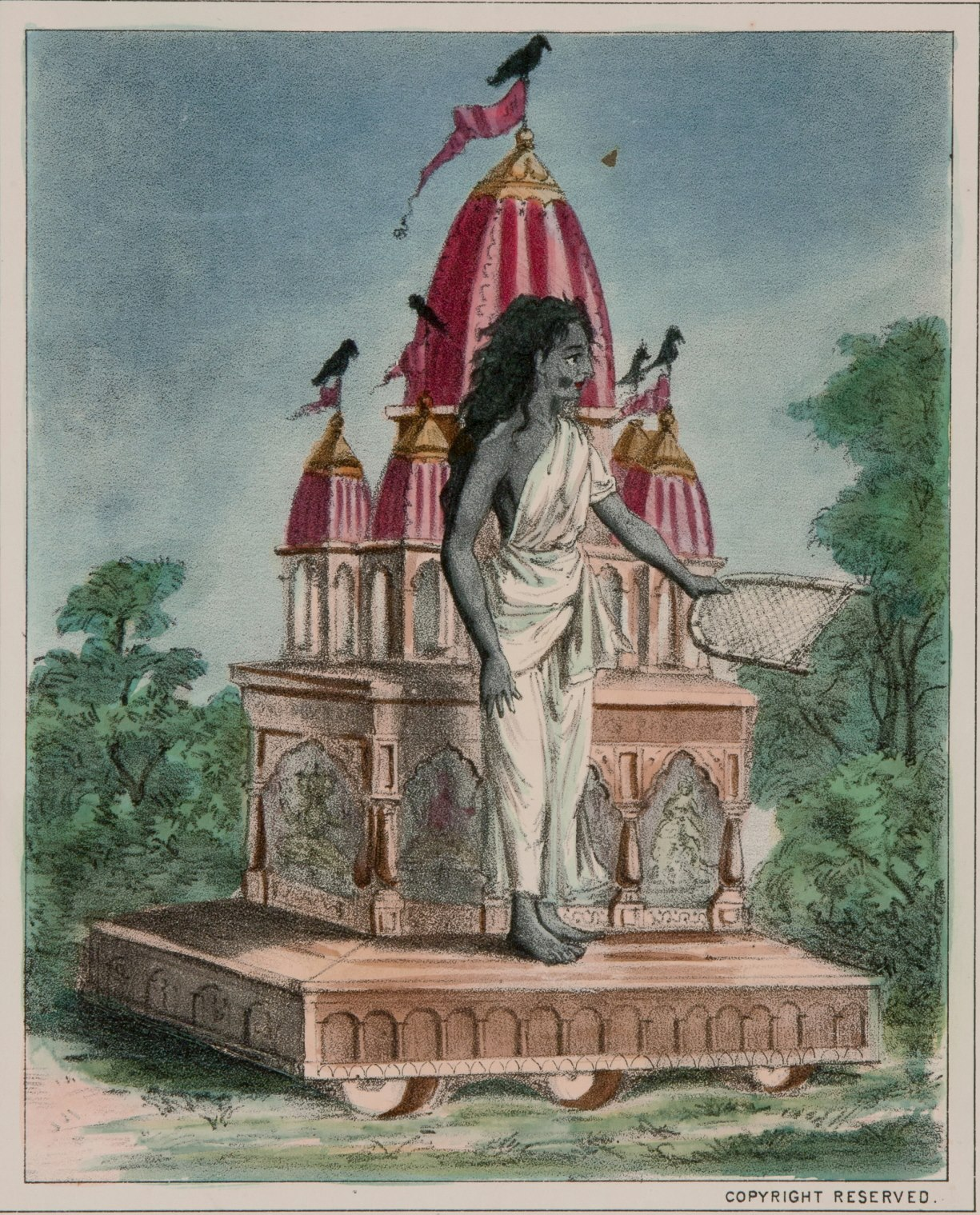
- A traditional image of Dhumavati as a widow with a winnowing basket on a horseless chariot
- Devanagari: धूमावती
- Sanskrit transliteration: Dhūmāvatī
- Affiliation: Mahavidya, Devi, Parvati
- Abode: Cremation ground
- Mantra: Dhum Dhum Dhumavati Svaha
- Mount: Crow
- Consort: Dhumavan the form of Shiva

Mahavidyas Sequence
- Predecessor: Chinnamasta
- Successor: Bagalamukhi

Dhumavati (Sanskrit: धूमावती, Dhūmāvatī, literally "the smoky one") is one of the Mahavidyas, a group of ten Hindu Tantric goddesses. Dhumavati represents the fearsome aspect of Mahadevi, the supreme goddess in Hindu traditions such as Shaktism. She is often portrayed as an old woman and is associated with things considered inauspicious and unattractive in Hinduism, such as the crow and the chaturmasya period. The goddess is often depicted carrying a winnowing basket on a horseless chariot or riding a crow, usually in a cremation ground.

Dhumavati is said to manifest herself at the time of cosmic dissolution (pralaya) and is "the Void" that exists before creation and after dissolution. While Dhumavati is generally associated with only inauspicious qualities, her thousand-name hymn relates her positive aspects as well as her negative ones. She is often called tender-hearted and a bestower of boons. Dhumavati is described as a great teacher, one who reveals ultimate knowledge of the universe, which is beyond the illusory divisions, like auspicious and inauspicious. Her ugly form teaches the devotee to look beyond the superficial, to look inwards and seek the inner truths of life.

Dhumavati is described as a giver of siddhis (supernatural powers), a rescuer from all troubles, and a granter of all desires and rewards, including ultimate knowledge and moksha (salvation). Her worship is also prescribed for those who wish to defeat their foes. Dhumavati's worship is considered ideal for unpaired members of society, such as bachelors, widows, and world renouncers as well as Tantrikas. In her Varanasi temple, however, she transcends her inauspiciousness and acquires the status of a local protective deity, where she is also worshipped by married couples. Although she has very few dedicated temples, her worship by Tantric ritual continues in private in secluded places like cremation grounds and forests.

== Origins ==
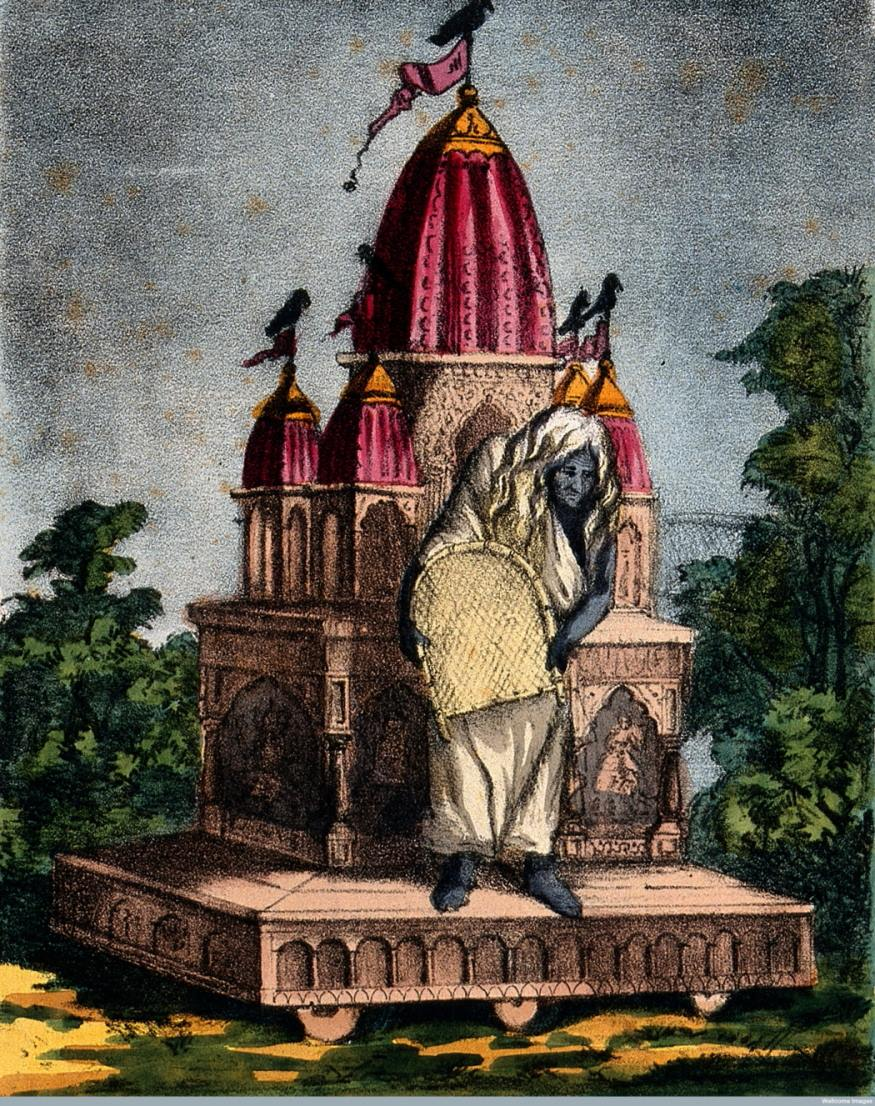
A Goddess Dhumavati, 19th-century lithograph

Dhumavati hardly has an independent existence outside the Mahavidya group. There is no historical mention of her before she is included among the Mahavidyas. As a goddess of poverty, frustration, and despair, Daniélou associates Dhumavati with Nirriti, the goddess of disease and misery, and Alakshmi, the goddess of misfortune and poverty. Kinsley adds another goddess to the list: Jyestha.

The Vedic goddess Nirriti is associated with death, decay, bad luck, anger, and need. Hymns emphasize offerings to keep her away. Like Nirriti, Dhumavati is associated with unpromising things and hardship. Jyestha, also an early Hindu goddess, has similarities in iconography with Dhumavati. Like Dhumavati, she is dark, ugly and is associated with the crow. Jyestha is described as being unable to tolerate any auspiciousness. Also like Dhumavati, Jyestha dwells in quarrels, inauspicious places, and has a bad temper. Lakshmana Desika, the commentator on the Saradatilaka-Tantra, identifies Dhumavati with Jyestha. Both Alakshmi, the sister and antithesis of Lakshmi (Shri), the goddess of wealth, luck and beauty, and Dhumavati are described as old, carrying a broom and having a crow banner. Both symbolize hunger, thirst, need, and poverty.

While there are similarities between Dhumavati and the three goddesses, the latter lack significant characteristics of Dhumavati, like her widowhood and a textual emphasis on her ugliness. The names of the three goddesses also do not figure in Dhumavati's nama stotras (hymns invoking her many names), where such identifications could have been explicitly mentioned. The three also lack the more fierce warrior aspects of Dhumavati as well as her positive aspects in the context of the Mahavidyas. In scholar David Kinsley's opinion, though the three may be Dhumavati's antecedents, they are not "the same" as Dhumavati. According to Kinsley, the concept of ten Mahavidyas may not be earlier than the 12th century.

== Legends ==
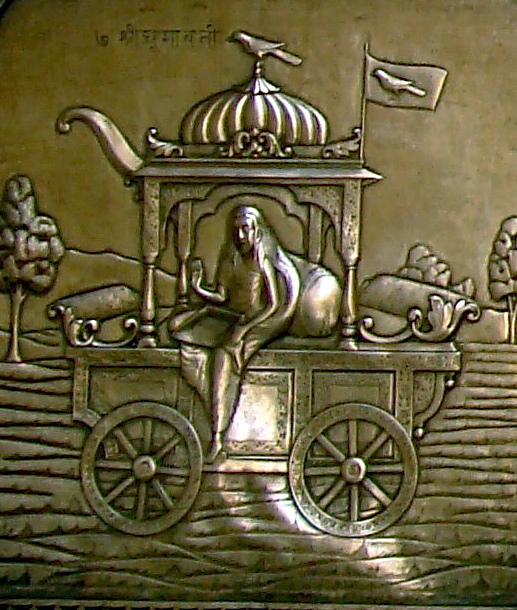
A silver panel of the door of the Kali temple, Amber Fort depicts Dhumavati on a horseless chariot with a winnowing basket.

Dhumavati is often named as the seventh Mahavidya. The Guhyatiguhya-Tantra equates Vishnu's ten avatars with the ten Mahavidyas. The fish incarnation Matsya is described as arising from Dhumavati. A similar list in the Mundamala equates Dhumavati with Vamana.

In a story from the Shakta Maha-Bhagavata Purana, which narrates the creation of all the Mahavidyas, Sati, the daughter of Daksha and first wife of god Shiva, feels insulted that she and Shiva are not invited to Daksha's yagna ("fire sacrifice") and insists on going there, despite Shiva's protests. After futile attempts to convince Shiva, the enraged Sati transforms into the Mahavidyas, who surround Shiva from the ten cardinal directions. Dhumavati stands in the southeast. Another similar legend replaces Sati with Kali (the chief Mahavidya) as the wife of Shiva and origin of the other Mahavidyas. The Devi Bhagavata Purana mentions the Mahavidyas as war-companions and forms of goddess Shakambhari.

A legend from the Shaktisamgama-Tantra describes that Sati commits suicide by jumping in Daksha's yagna and Dhumavati rises with a blackened face from the sad smoke of Sati's burning body. She is "all that is left of Sati" and is her outraged and insulted avatar. The Pranatosini-Tantra explains the widowhood of Dhumavati. Once, Sati asked Shiva to give her food. When Shiva declines, the goddess eats him to satisfy her extreme hunger. When Shiva requests her to disgorge him, she obliges. Shiva then rejects her and curses her to assume the form of a widow. Another oral legend tells that Dhumavati was created by the warrior goddess Durga in the battle against demons Shumbha and Nishumbha. Dhumavati's literal name ("she who abides in smoke") comes from her ability to defeat demons by creating stinging smoke.

The Pranatosini-Tantra version stresses Dhumavati's destructive aspect and hunger, which is satisfied only when she consumes Shiva, who himself contains or creates the universe. It brings out her inauspicious status as a widow and her self-assertion on her husband.

== Iconography and textual descriptions ==
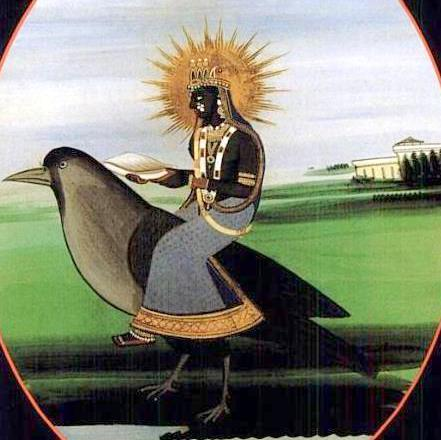
An early 20th-century Rajput painting depicting grey-complexioned Dhumavati wearing dark clothes and holding a winnowing basket. She is riding a crow but adorned with jewellery, decorations which are contrary to her traditional description.

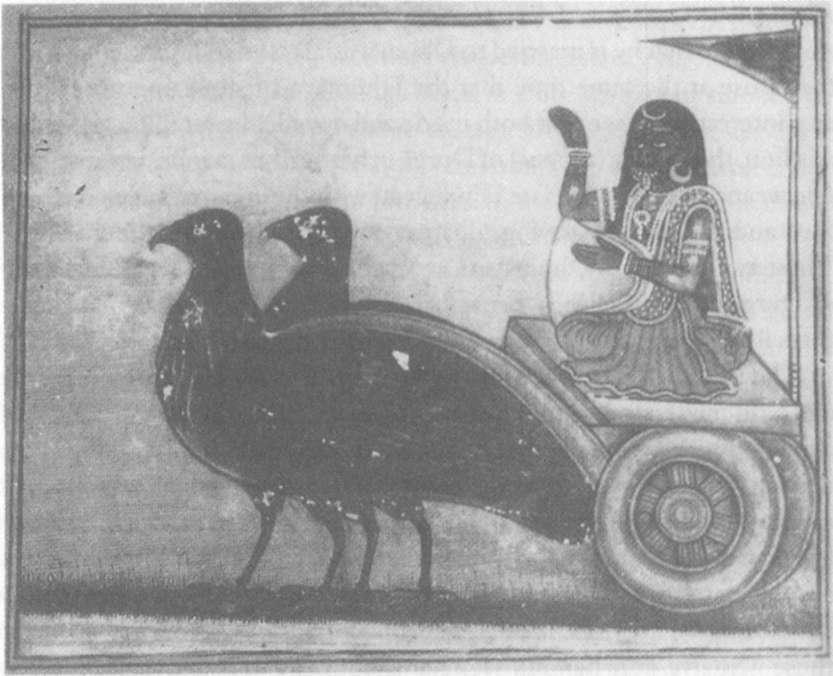
A late 18th-century painting by Molaram depicting grey-complexioned Dhumavati holding a winnowing basket, riding a chariot, but pulled by two black scavenger birds and she being adorned with jewellery, in contrast to her traditional description

The Dhumavati Tantra describes her as an old and ugly widow. She is thin, tall, unhealthy, and has a pale-grey complexion. She is described as restless and wicked. Unadorned with jewellery, she wears old, dirty clothes and has dishevelled hair. Her eyes are fearsome, her nose long and crooked, and some of her long fang-like teeth have fallen out, leaving her smile with gaps. Her ears are ugly and rough; her breasts hang down. In one of her trembling hands, she holds a winnowing basket, while the other makes a boon-conferring gesture (varada-mudra) or knowledge-giving gesture (cinmudra). She rides in a horseless chariot bearing an emblem of a crow and a banner. She is astute and crafty, though. Always hungry and thirsty, Dhumavati initiates quarrels and invokes fear.

In the Prapancasarasara-samgraha, Dhumavati is described as having a black complexion and wearing ornaments made of snakes. Her dress is made of rags taken from cremation grounds. She holds a spear and a skull-cup (kapala) in her two hands. The spear is sometimes replaced by a sword. Another description in the same text says Dhumavati is aged with a wrinkled, angry face and cloud-like complexion. Her nose, eyes, and throat resemble a crow's. She holds a broom, a winnowing fan, a torch, and a club. She is cruel and frowning. Her hair appears dishevelled and she wears the simple clothes of a beggar. Her breasts are dry. Her hair is grey, her teeth crooked and missing, and her clothes old and worn.

Sometimes, Dhumavati rides a crow and holds a trident. She may be depicted wearing a garland of severed heads, with red-coloured limbs and matted but dishevelled hair. Sometimes, she carries the buffalo-horn of Yama, the god of death, symbolizing her association with death.

Dhumavati has fierce, warlike attributes too. In the Shakta pramoda, she crushes bones in her mouth, creating an awful noise. She also makes the fearful and warlike noises of drums and bells. She wears a garland of skulls, chews the corpses of the demons Chanda and Munda, and drinks a mixture of blood and wine.

Though there are standard descriptions of Dhumavati's form, some relatively recent paintings deviate from it. For example, an 18th-century painting by Molaram depicts Dhumavati sitting on a chariot pulled by two black scavenger birds with curved beaks. The painting follows the usual attributes like the winnowing basket, boon-giving gesture, but also depicts her young and beautiful with full breasts and adorned in gold finery, a stark contrast to her usual form. An early 20th-century painting from Varanasi depicts her riding a crow, holding a trident, a sword, a winnowing fan, and a bowl in her four arms, dark-complexioned, with sagging breasts, wearing white clothes and with cremation flames in the background. She is again adorned in gold finery and wears a gold-hewn lower garment, unusual for a widow's dress. Another 18th-century Nepali manuscript depicts a complete deviation from her traditional descriptions. She is completely nude with high breasts, wears a pearl necklace and headband, stands on a peacock with legs apart, and holds a mirror while looking at her reflection. A ring of fire surrounds her, possibly conveying cremation flames.

== Symbolism and associations ==
Vedic scholar Ganapati Muni described the goddess:

Perceived as the Void, as the dissolved form of consciousness, when all beings are dissolved in sleep in the supreme Brahman, having swallowed the entire universe, the seer-poets call her the most glorious and the eldest, Dhumavati. She exists in the forms of sleep, lack of memory, illusion, and dullness in the creatures immersed in the illusion of the world, but among the yogis she becomes the power that destroys all thoughts, indeed Samadhi (death and liberation) itself.

— Ganapati Muni, Uma Sahasram 38, pp. 13—14,

Dhumavati is always considered a widow, and thus, is the only Mahavidya without a consort. Though associated with Shiva, having eaten him, he has since left her. Having destroyed the male element (Purusha) in the universe, she is left with nothing, but she is still Shakti, the female element with latent energy. Dhumavati's insatiable hunger and thirst is highlighted in many texts, and has been interpreted as the manifestation of her unsatisfied desires.

As a widow in a horseless chariot, Dhumavati is portrayed as a woman going nowhere in life and society. She is "all that is unlucky, unattractive and inauspicious". She appears in the form of the poor, the beggars, the lepers, and the diseased. She dwells in the "wounds of the world", deserts, ruined houses, poverty, tatters, hunger, thirst, quarrels, mourning of children, in wild and other uncivilized, dangerous places. Widows in general are considered inauspicious, dangerous, and susceptible to possession by evil spirits. As a divine widow, Dhumavati is to be feared. Dhumavati is described as a hag or witch, crafty and quarrelsome; she represents all the dreaded miseries of life.

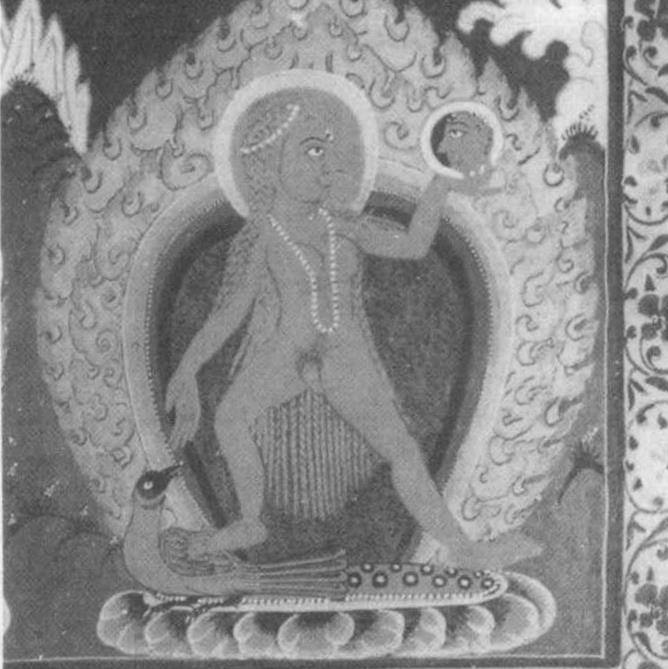
18th-century Nepali manuscript depicting Dhumavati in more erotic fashion

Alternative paintings show her as young and adorned, as a sexually tempting, eroticised, young, attractive yet inauspicious widow. Her thousand-name hymn says that she gives enjoyment, is completely beautiful and adorned with garlands, clothes, and jewellery. She is also associated with sex in the hymn, which calls her "She Whose Form Is Rati". Rati literally means "sexual intercourse" and also the name of the Hindu love goddess. Dhumavati is said to enjoy sexual intercourse, to be present where sexual activity is, and to be occupied with sex. She is said to like liquor (a forbidden drink), to be intoxicated, and to be worshiped by intoxicated people. She also indulges in the Tantric ritual of breaking the five taboos—the Panchamakara, which include consuming wine, meat, fish, parched grain and ritual sex.

Dhumavati is a manifestation of the anti-social and inauspicious elements in women and is an antithesis to the goddess Lakshmi. Like Alakshmi, Dhumavati rules over the four months of the rainy season, when even solar light is obscured by the evil water spirit. This coincides with Chaturmas, a period during the year when the god Vishnu sleeps. At that time, darkness rules and the soul loses its usual luster. This period is considered inauspicious, and as such as no auspicious ceremonies like marriage can take place.

The presence of the crow, a carrier of death, in her iconography as well as her textual description of having crow-like features associate her with death and inauspiciousness. Another motif in her iconography linking her with death is the presence of a cremation ground and cremation pyres in the background. Her thousand name hymn says that she lives in the cremation ground, sits on a corpse, wears ashes, and blesses those who haunt the grounds. The Prapancasarasara-samgraha relates that she wears a dress taken from a corpse. Dhumavati is the embodiment of tamas guna, associated with ignorance and darkness. She likes meat and wine, both tamasic in nature. The Pranatosinitantra associates her with tamas, when classifying the mahavidyas based on guna.

Beyond name and form, beyond human categories, alone and indivisible, as the great dissolution, she (Dhumavati) reveals the nature of ultimate knowledge, which is formless and knows no divisions into good or bad, pure and impure, auspicious and inauspicious.

— David Kinsley.

Dhumavati is often said to appear at the time of Maha-pralaya, the great dissolution of the cosmos and is equated with the dark clouds that rise during Pralaya. Her thousand name hymn also calls her by names meaning "She Whose Form is Pralaya", "Who Is Occupied with Pralaya", "Who Creates and Causes Pralaya" and "Who Walks About in Pralaya". An author says that she stays even after Shiva (who is Maha-kala) ("Great Time" or "Great Death") disappears, thus she is "the Power of Time", and considered to be beyond time and space. Dhumavati represents ultimate destruction, the smoke that rises after the universe is destroyed.

The goddess' name "Dhumavati" means the "smoky one". She is said not to like offerings burnt in a fire that is not smoky. She likes smoke from incense, offerings, and cremation pyres, as these symbolize destruction. Dhumavati also exists in the form of smoke and roams everywhere at her will.

While Dhumavati generally is associated with only inauspicious qualities, her thousand-name hymn tells about her positive aspects, too. She is often called as bestower of boons and tender-hearted. Her hymn says that she lives in the midst of women and is worshipped by them. Her hymn sings of her as the giver of children.

As an ancestor or Grandmother spirit, she embodies a great teacher and guide, granting knowledge of the ultimate truth of life and death. Her smoke hides that which is obvious, revealing hidden secrets and truths of "the unknown and the unmanifest". Frawley says her outer appearance as poverty is deceptive and a mere illusion that hides the inner reality. She is "the good fortune that comes to us in the form of misfortune". Dhumavati embodies the "power of suffering". Through the negative aspects that Dhumavati represents rise the virtues of patience, persistence, forgiveness, and detachment. Without the revealing of this negativity of life, it cannot be transcended and the secret truths would remain hidden under the smoky veil of illusion.

Dhumavati's outer inauspicious, fearful form reveals the dangers of considering sensory pleasures as fulfilment-giving. The winnowing basket, used to separate the husk from the grain, symbolizes the need to separate the outer illusory form from the inner reality. Her ugly form teaches the devotee to go beyond the outer deceptive appearances and seek the inner truths of life.

Dhumavati is the primordial darkness and ignorance, from which rises the world of illusion. She represents the darkness/ignorance before creation and after decay. This ignorance, which obscures the ultimate reality, is necessary because without the realization of this ignorance, true knowledge can not be achieved. Dhumavati also represents yogic sleep (Yoganidra), the pre-creation state of consciousness, as well as the primal sleep (the Void) in which all creation would dissolve and reach ultimate reality of Brahman. This void is pure consciousness, the cessation of movements of the mind, and silence. Even Dhumavati's ability to spread disease is also considered positive, as disease punishes the wicked and restores cosmic order. Dhumavati is also associated with the heart or middle region of the body.Dhumavati is also called 'Arikshyaykar' or 'one who destroys both the external as well as the internal enemy'.

Dhumavati is sometimes regarded as an older form of Kali, in which she represents timelessness and unmanifest life-force. Another tradition identifies Dhumavati with Smashana-kali, "Kali who lives in the cremation ground." She is considered a terrible aspect of the Goddess and included among the Kalikula ("family of Kali") goddesses. Dhumavati's nama stotras (hymn with names of the deities) identify her with Parvati, Sati, and glorify her as a slayer of demons.

== Worship ==
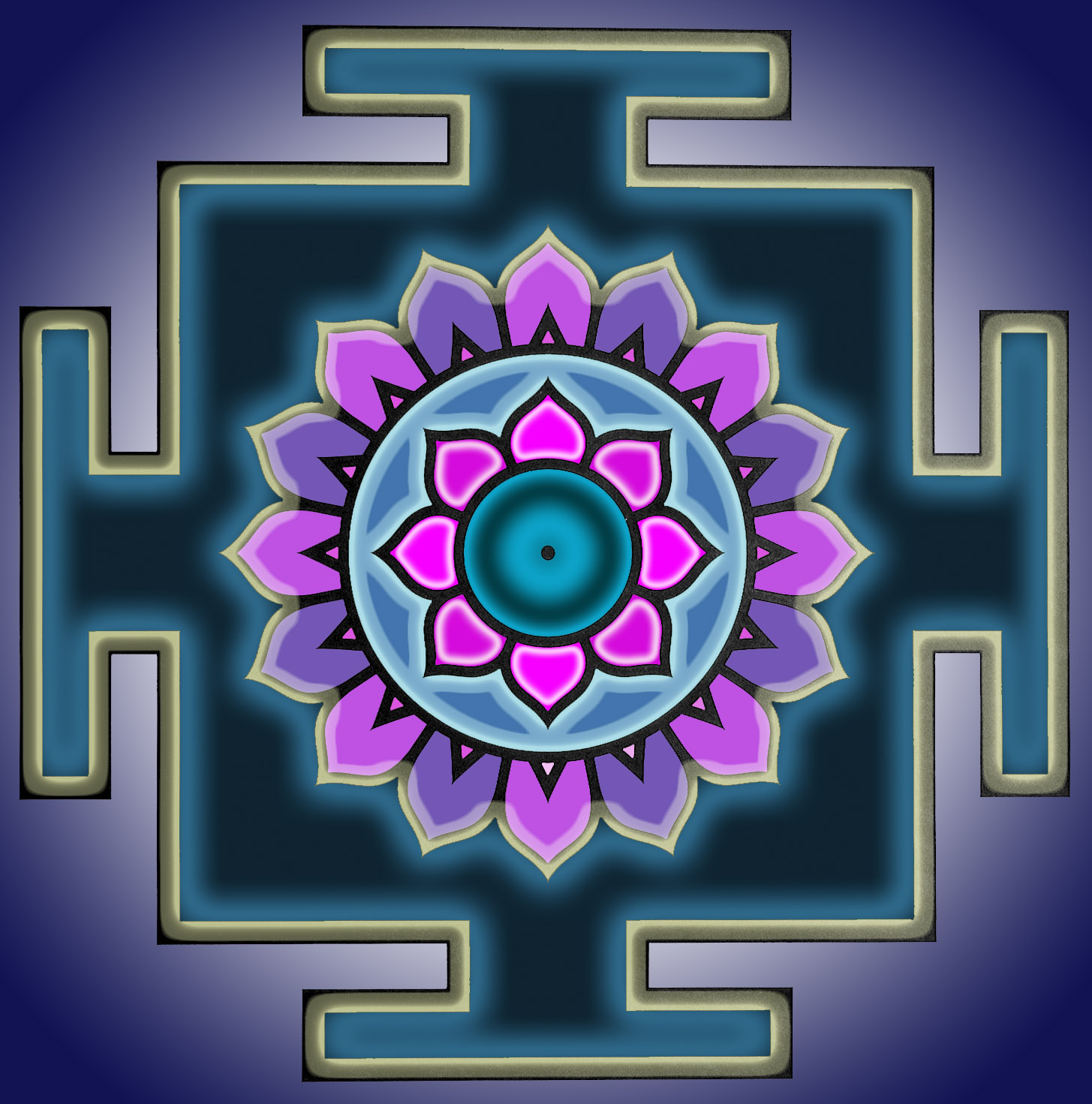
The yantra of Dhumavati, used in her worship

Though Dhumavati may seem to be a goddess to be avoided due to her inauspiciousness, she is described as tender-hearted and one who gives her devotees whatever they want. In several places, Dhumavati is described as a giver of siddhis (supernatural powers), a rescuer from all troubles and granter of all desires and rewards, including ultimate knowledge and moksha (salvation). Dhumavati's worship is prescribed to ward off all the negativity that she stands for and to transcend the smoke screen to acquire true knowledge. By worshipping and confronting her, the embodiment of the impure, the inauspicious and outside the fringes of society, one can look beyond the arbitrary dichotomies of society and acquire ultimate knowledge to become spiritually enlightened.

Married people, however, are advised not to worship Dhumavati. It is said that her worship creates a feeling of wanting solitude and distaste of worldly things, which is considered as highest characteristics of a spiritual quest. Thus, Dhumavati's worship is appropriate for world renouncers who roam as lone wanderers and widows who parallel the life of world renouncers. Dhumavati is also described a being partial to single persons and especially partial to widows. Widows are considered the only beings who can withstand her power.

The mantra of Dhumavati is "Dhum Dhum Dhumavati Svaha", containing a repetition of her seed syllable Dhum. This mantra used in the worship of Dhumavati, sometimes with her yantra, is believed to create a protective smoke shielding the devotee from negativity and death. Her worship involves clearing one's mind of all thoughts and leaving back the known, meditating on the unknown silence beyond, and the Void that Dhumavati represents.

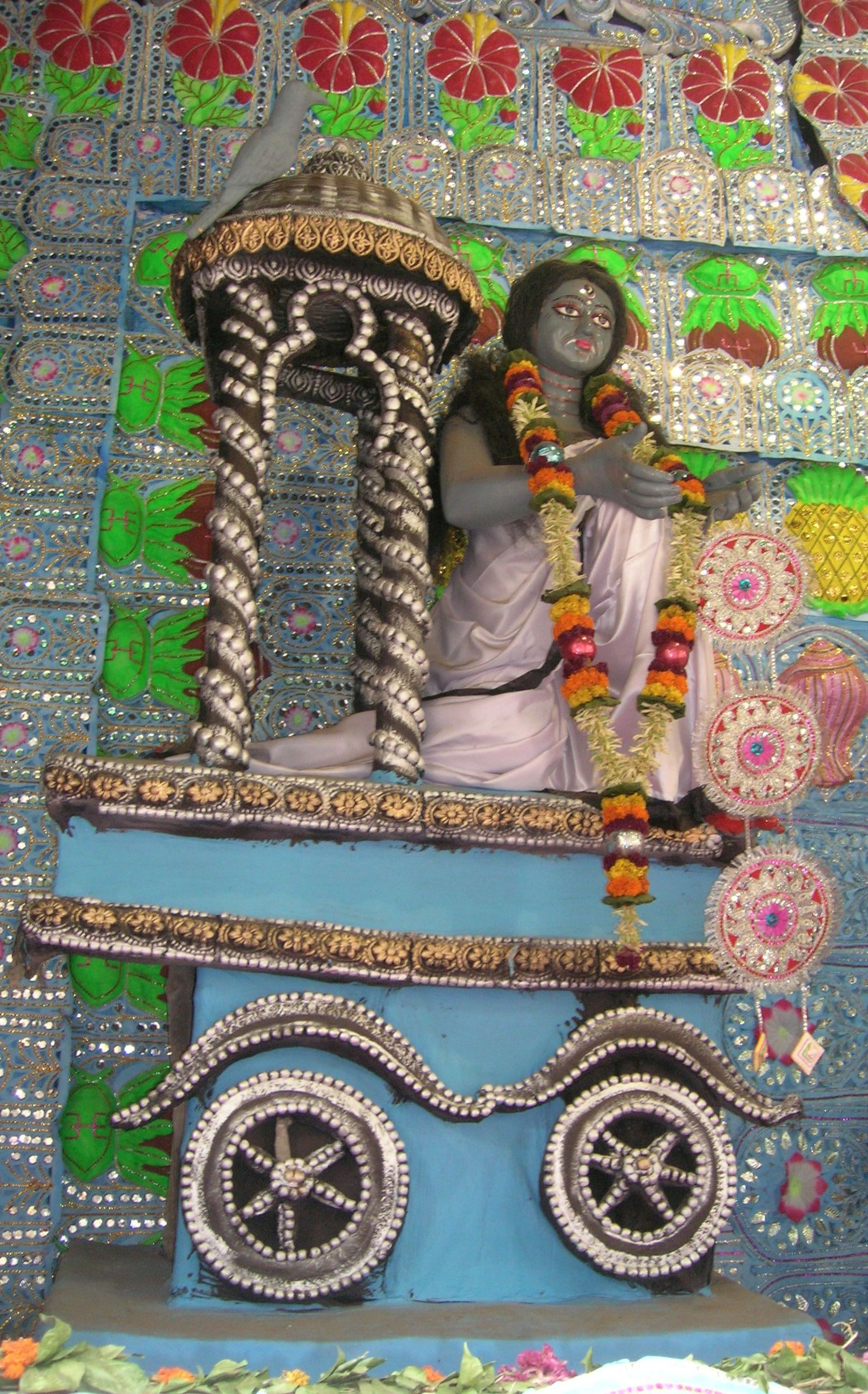
Dhumavati idol worshipped with other Mahavidyas in a Kali Puja pandal in Kolkata.

The Shaktisamgama Tantra says that Dhumavati can be worshipped for the Uchhatana (eradication) of a person. A worshipper should imagine the world as well as the goddess's mantra as grey. He should blacken his teeth and wear black clothes and observe regulations, such as eating little, sleeping on the ground, and subduing his senses. In this worship procedure called kakakarma (crow-procedure), he should "transform his mind into a crow" by which one can cause harm to a person. Another Tantric text mentions the worshipper should burn a crow in a cremation flame and, while repeating the goddesses' mantra, spread the ashes in the enemy's house, which will lead to his destruction. The text further says Dhumavati should be worshipped only by Dakshinamarga ("right-handed path"). While the Kalarudra-tantra says Dhumavati can be worshipped for destructive purposes, Shakta-pramoda relates that her worship is useful to acquire siddhi to destroy one's foes.

Dhumavati's worship is performed in the night in a cremation ground, bare-bodied with the exception of a loincloth. The fourth lunar day of the dark fortnight (Krishna Paksha) is considered the special day to perform her puja (worship). The worshipper should observe a fast and remain silent for a whole day and night. They should also perform a homa ("fire sacrifice"), wearing wet clothes and a turban, repeating the goddess' mantra in a cremation ground, forest, or any lonely place.

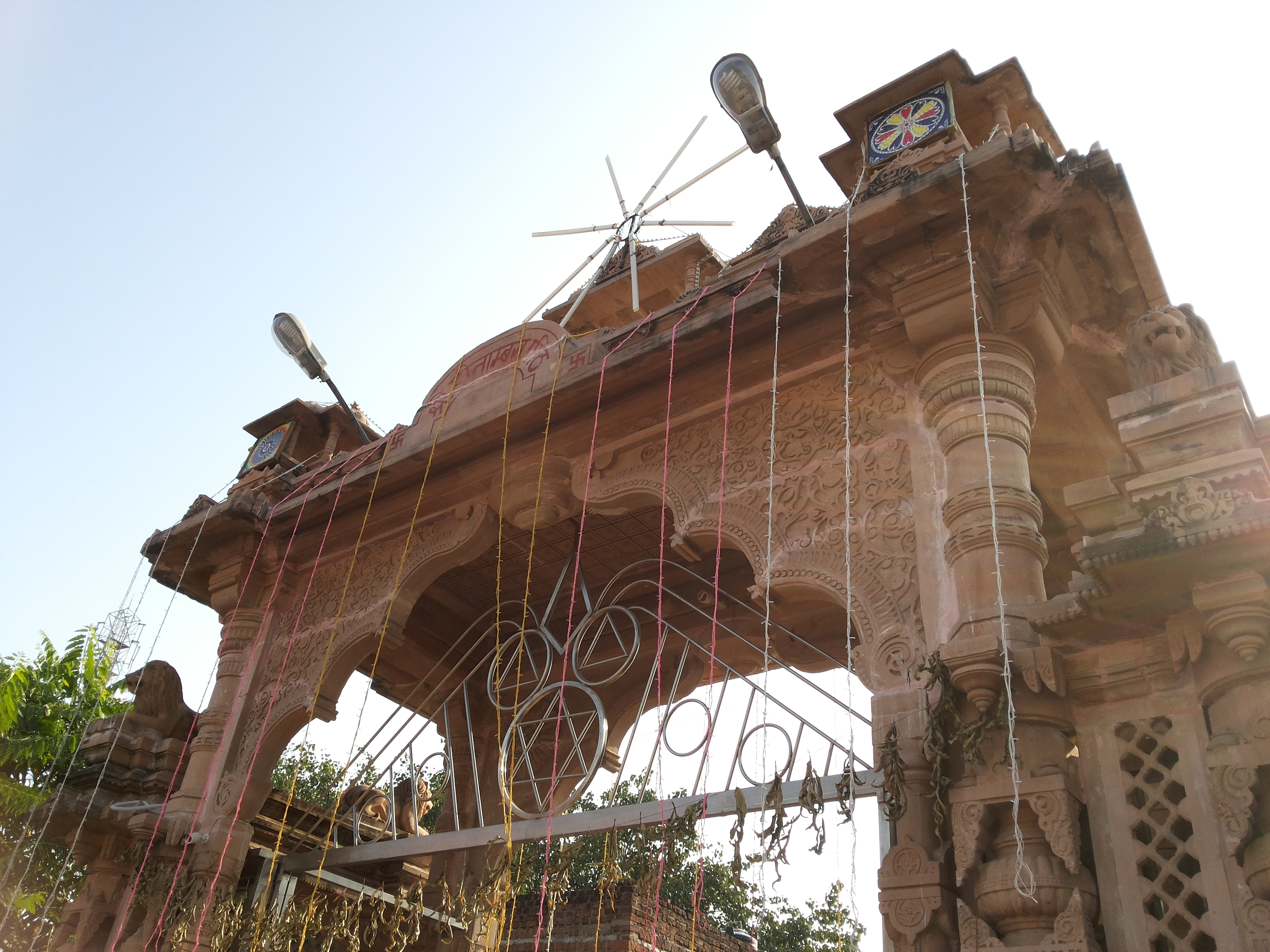
Pitambara Peeth at Datia

Dhumavati temples are extremely rare. At a temple in Varanasi, Dhumavati is the main deity. At the Varanasi temple, which claims to be a Shakta pitha, Dhumavati's idol rides a chariot and holds a winnowing fan, a broom, and a pot, while the fourth hand makes the fear-not gesture (abhaya-mudra). The goddess is offered usual offerings like flowers and fruit, but also liquor, bhang, cigarettes, meat, and sometimes even blood sacrifices. Though traditional devotees of Dhumavati (world renouncers and Tantrikas) worship at the Varanasi temple, here the goddess transcends her traditional role as "the inauspicious, dangerous goddess who can be approached only by heroic tantric adepts". Dhumavati acquires the role of a local guardian deity, or village deity, who protects the locals and even married couples worship her. There is also a temple dedicated to the goddess in Pitambara Peeth temple complex, Datia. Smaller Dhumavati temples exist in Rajrappa in Jharkhand and near the Kamakhya Temple near Guwahati.
