= Bagalamukhi Temple, Nalkheda =

Coordinates: 23°50′29.66″N 76°14′1.51″E

Maa Baglamukhi Mandir Nalkheda
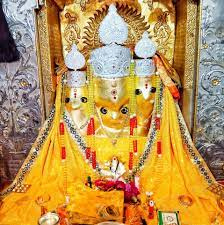

- Location in Madhya Pradesh

Religion
- Affiliation: Hinduism
- Festival: Navratri

Location
- Location: Nalkheda
- State: Madhya Pradesh
- Country: India
- Interactive map of Maa Baglamukhi Mandir Nalkheda

Website
- https://mabaglamukhi.org Live Darshan's channel on YouTube

The Bagalamukhi Temple, Nalkheda is a Hindu temple located on the banks of the Lakhundar River, a tributary of the Narmada River, in Nalkheda, a town in the Agar Malwa district of Madhya Pradesh, India. It is dedicated to the goddess Bagalamukhi, one of the ten Tantric Mahavidya goddesses. She is associated with the colour yellow.

== History ==
The temple is popular at the time of the Navaratri festival. It is one of three in India noted historically as having shrines to Bagalamukhi, the others being in Datia and Bankhandi, Kangra, Himachal Pradesh. It was restored in 1815.

== Architecture ==
The unique feature of the temple is the central icon being a triad, with Parvati in the center in form of Baglamukhi, along with goddess Lakshmi and Saraswati. Symbolizing the presence of the trinity goddesses in form of syambhu Baglamukhi. There are also statues of the deities Krishna, Hanuman and Bhairav at the temple.
