= Pitambara Peeth =

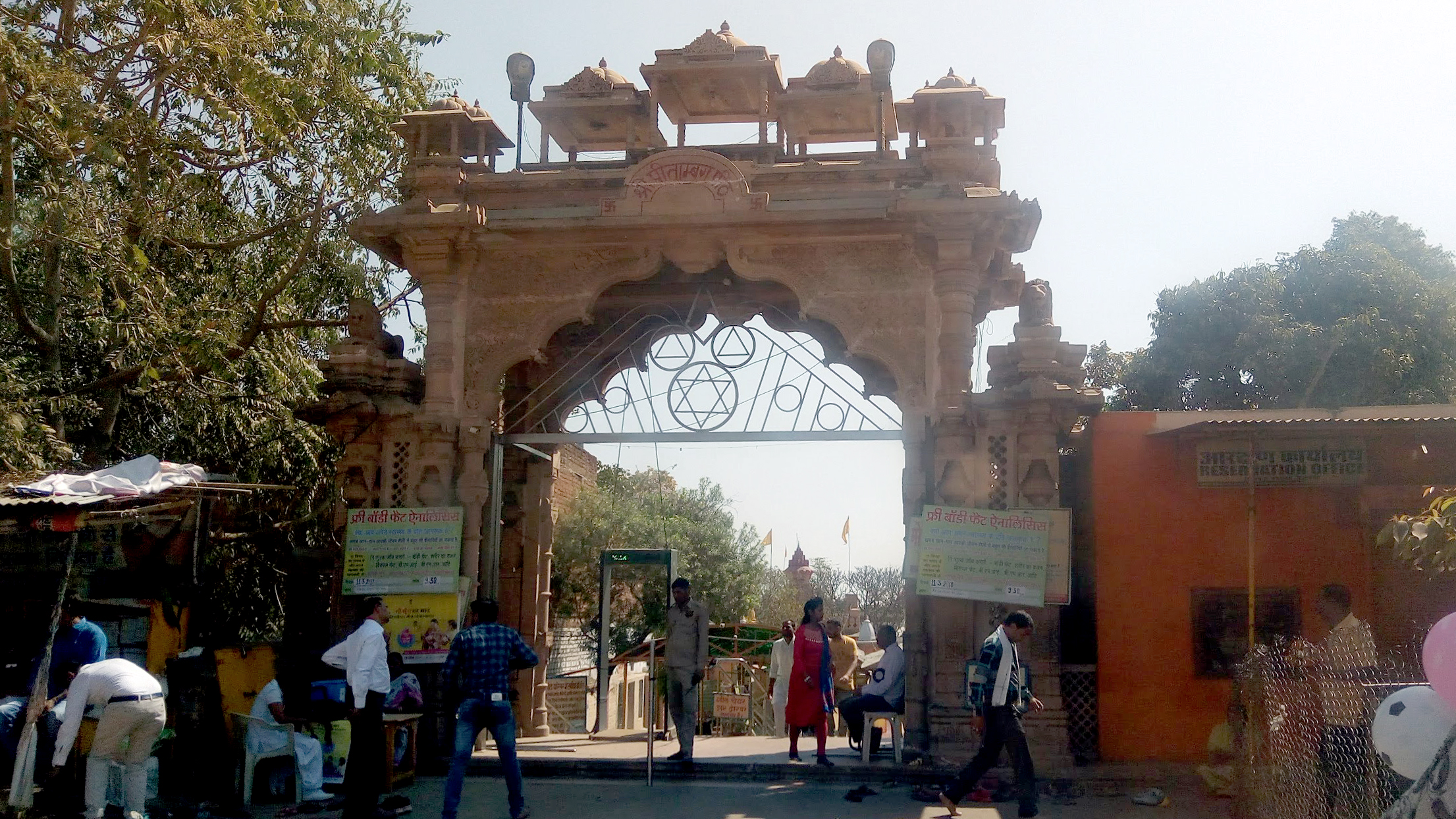

Religion
- Affiliation: Hinduism
- District: Datia
- Deity: Bagalamukhi

Location
- Location: Datia
- State: Madhya Pradesh
- Country: India

Website
- Official website

Shri Peetambra Peetha is a complex of Hindu temples (including an Ashram), located in the city of Datia, in the Madhya Pradesh state of central India. It was, according to many legends 'Tapasthali' (place of meditation) of many mythological as well as real life people. The Shivling of shree Vankhandeswar Shiva is alleged to be from the times of Mahabharata. It is primarily a Shakti pitha place of worship (devoted to Mother Goddess). Many people come here for worship on Saturday.

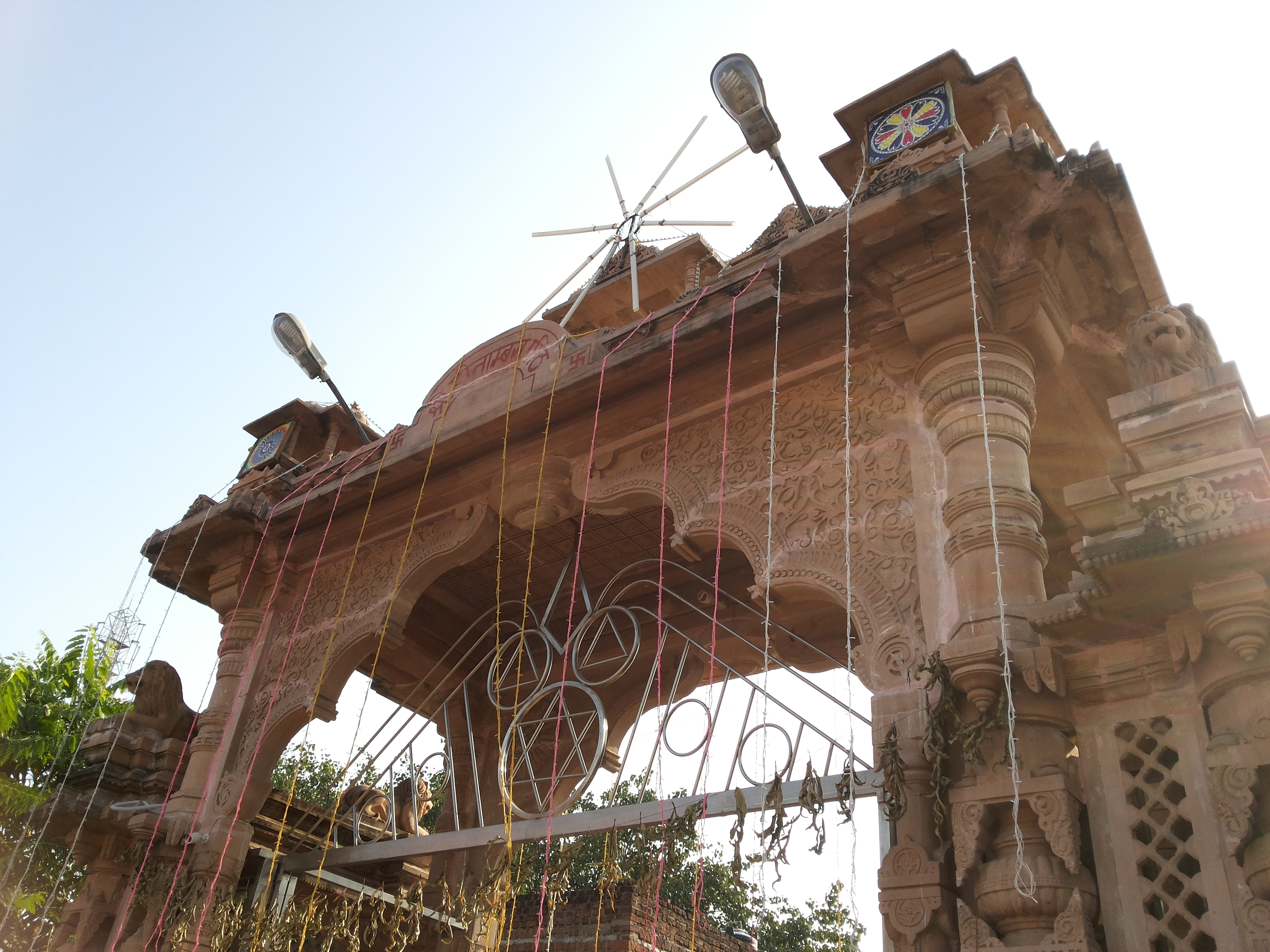
Pitambara Peeth at Datia

== Overview ==
Shri Peetambara Peetha is one of the most famous temples of Baglamukhi. It was established by Shree Swami Ji in 1920s. He also established the temple of goddess Dhumavati within the ashram. Dhumavati and Bagalamukhi are two of the ten Mahavidyas. In addition to these, there are temples of Parshuram, Hanuman, Kal Bhairav and other god and goddess spread across the large area of Ashram.

Currently the Peeth is maintained by a trust. There is a Sanskrit library which was established by the Pujyapaad, and is maintained by Ashram. One can get the books explaining the history of the Ashram and secret mantras of various kind of sadhanas and tantras. One of the unique feature of the Ashram is its endeavor to spread the light of Sanskrit language to young children, free of cost. Ashram conducts Sanskrit debates across the years.

Pujyapaad was called 'Swamiji'or 'Maharaaj' by the devotees. No one knows from where he came, or his name; nor did he disclose this to anyone. However, he was a Parivrajakachrya Dandi Swami, who stayed on in Datia for a longer period. He was and still is a spiritual icon for many who visit the Peeth or have been associated with him directly or indirectly. He did and led many anushthans and sadhanas for the protection and welfare of both humanity and the country. Pt Shri Gaya Prasad Nayak ji (Babuji) of Garhi Malehara is renowned for his knowledge of Swamiji. Pujya Swamiji Maharaj and Babuji's Guruji were Gurubhai.

Pujyapaad was a strong devotee of the Goddess Pitambara. He liked the Sanskrit language and had good knowledge of Urdu, Persian and Arabic, English, Pali and Prakrit. He liked classical music and various great classical musicians used to visit the ashram, including Pundit Gundai Maharaj, Siyaram Tiwari, Rajan and Sajan Mishra, and Dagar Bandhu. Classical musician Acharaya Brhaspati was a follower of Pujyapaad.

== Nearby Tourist place to visit ==
=== Sonagir Temples ===
This cluster of white marble is the famous Jain pilgrimage known as Swarnagiri or Shravangiri. It has 77 temples on a hill and 26 in the village below. The most beautiful among these is dedicated to Chandranatha, the eighth of the 24 Tirthankaras. It is located in the Sonagiri hills, Datia district.

== Location ==
The ashram is located in Datia town of Madhya Pradesh, India approx 75 km from Gwalior (Airport) and approx 29 km from Jhansi. It is well connected by train and the ashram is around 3 km from Datia railway station.

This Shakta pitha has Vankhandeswar Shiva Temple as well, which is not only said to be of the time of the Mahabharata but has been certified by the Archaeological Survey of India (ASI).

The temple of Goddess Pitambara doesn't take any offerings in the form of money from the devotees who come to visit the temple.
