= Kamalatmika =

Tantric form of Lakshmi

Kamala
- Bestower of Fortune, Abundance & Divine Bliss
- Member of The Ten Mahavidyas
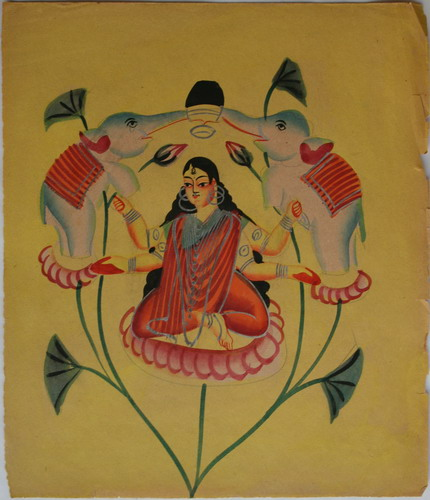
- Kamala flanked by elephants
- Devanagari: कमला
- Sanskrit transliteration: Kamalā
- Affiliation: Mahavidya, Shaktism, Lakshmi
- Symbol: Lotus
- Mount: Elephant
- Consort: Sadashiva in the form of Vishnu

Mahavidyas Sequence
- Predecessor: Matangi

In Hinduism, Kamalā (Sanskrit: कमला) transl. 'lotus' or Kamalātmikā, (Sanskrit: कमलात्मिका) also known as Kamalālayā (transl. the one who dwells in lotuses) is considered to be the Tantric characterisation of the goddess of prosperity, Lakshmi. In Shaktism, she is represented as the Devi in the fullness of her graceful aspect. She is believed to be the tenth and the last Mahavidya.

== Iconography ==
In Shakti tradition, the lotus goddess is exalted thus:

She has a beautiful golden complexion. She is being bathed by four large elephants who pour jars of nectar over her. In her four hands, she holds two lotuses and makes the signs of granting boons and giving assurance. She wears a resplendent crown and a silken dress. I pay obeisance to her who is seated on a lotus in a lotus posture.

Let Kamalā protect us by her wonderful side-glances that delight the heart of Viṣṇu. She is seated on a lotus, has a smiling face, and with her four hands holds two lotuses and makes the signs of giving favours and granting assurance. Her complexion is like the brightness of lightning. Her breasts are firm and heavy and are decorated with garlands of pearls.

She is resplendent like the rising sun and wears a bright moon disc on her brow. She is adorned with a crown and necklace of jewels. She is bent down due to the weight of her large breasts, and in her hands, she holds two lotuses and two bunches of rice shoots. She has three lotus-like eyes. She wears the kauṣṭubha gem and has a smiling face.

The fact that Kamala is associated with elephants has two connotations: Firstly, elephants are harbingers of clouds and rain in Hinduism, thus indicating fertility; Secondly, as a powerful creature, it represents royal authority and divinity.

== Among Mahavidya ==
While Lakshmi is portrayed as a loving wife to Narayana and is often depicted as massaging his feet in her submissive role, Kamala is rendered more independent in her role, more candidly performing her duties as the goddess who ushers in bliss and prosperity. While she is still deemed as the beloved of Vishnu, he is mostly absent.
