= Bhairavi =

Hindu goddess

- Goddess of Kundalini
- Member of The Ten Mahavidyas
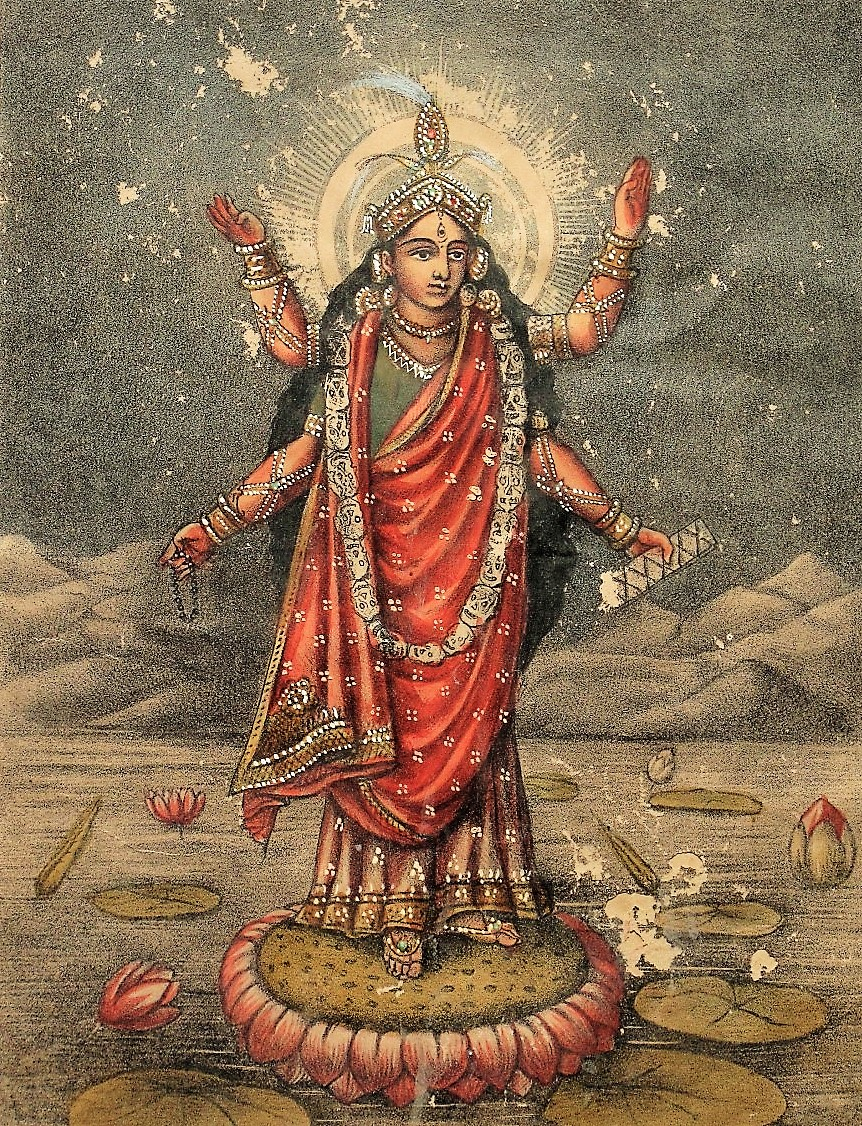
- A lithograph of Bhairavi
- Affiliation: Parvati, Adishakti, Mahavidya, Mother Goddess, Mahakali
- Abode: Mooladhara chakra and Manidvipa
- Mantra: Om Hisraim Hisklreem Hisrouhu
- Weapon: Rosary,book, abhaya and varada
- Mount: Red Lotus
- Consort: Bhairava(a form of Shiva)

Bhairavi (Sanskrit: भैरवी) is a Hindu goddess, described as one of the Mahāvidyas, the ten avatars of the mother goddess.

== Etymology ==
The name Bhairavi means "terrifying" or "awe-inspiring".

== Iconography ==
Her dhyana shloka in the Devi Mahatmya describes her form. She wears red garments and wears a garland of severed heads around her neck. She has three eyes and her head is adorned with a crescent moon. Alternatively, she is a beautiful woman with three eyes, clad in red (the typical color of tantric goddesses). She has a crown or a crescent, and her hair is loose. She may appear holding rosaries, manuscripts, a trident, a sword, a noose, a bow, etc. There are blood stains on her breasts and she may wear a garland of human heads or skulls.

Tripura Sundari and Tripura Bhairavi are closely associated but different.

== Legend ==
Bhairavi is also a title for a female adept in Kundalini, Tantra. A yogini is a student of Tantra or an aspirant. A Bhairavi has succeeded in Tantra with the help of 64 yoginis. Yogini or Jogini are 64 in number. Yoginis are female supporting deities of Bhairavi. Bhairavi is the supreme leader of all 64 yoginis. Bhairav also has 52 supporting powers called 52 Bhairav. Bhairavi is the consort of Bhairava according to the Puranas and Tantras. In Tantra Shastra all 64 yogini, 52 Bhairav and 56 Kalve work together.

Bhairavi is also called as Shubhankari, which means that she is the doer of auspicious deeds to her devotees who are her children, which means she is a good mother. She also favours violence, punishment and bloodshed to those who are irreligious and cruel, which also means that she is the mother of all violence to them. She is said to be seen as violent and terrible but is a benign mother to her children.

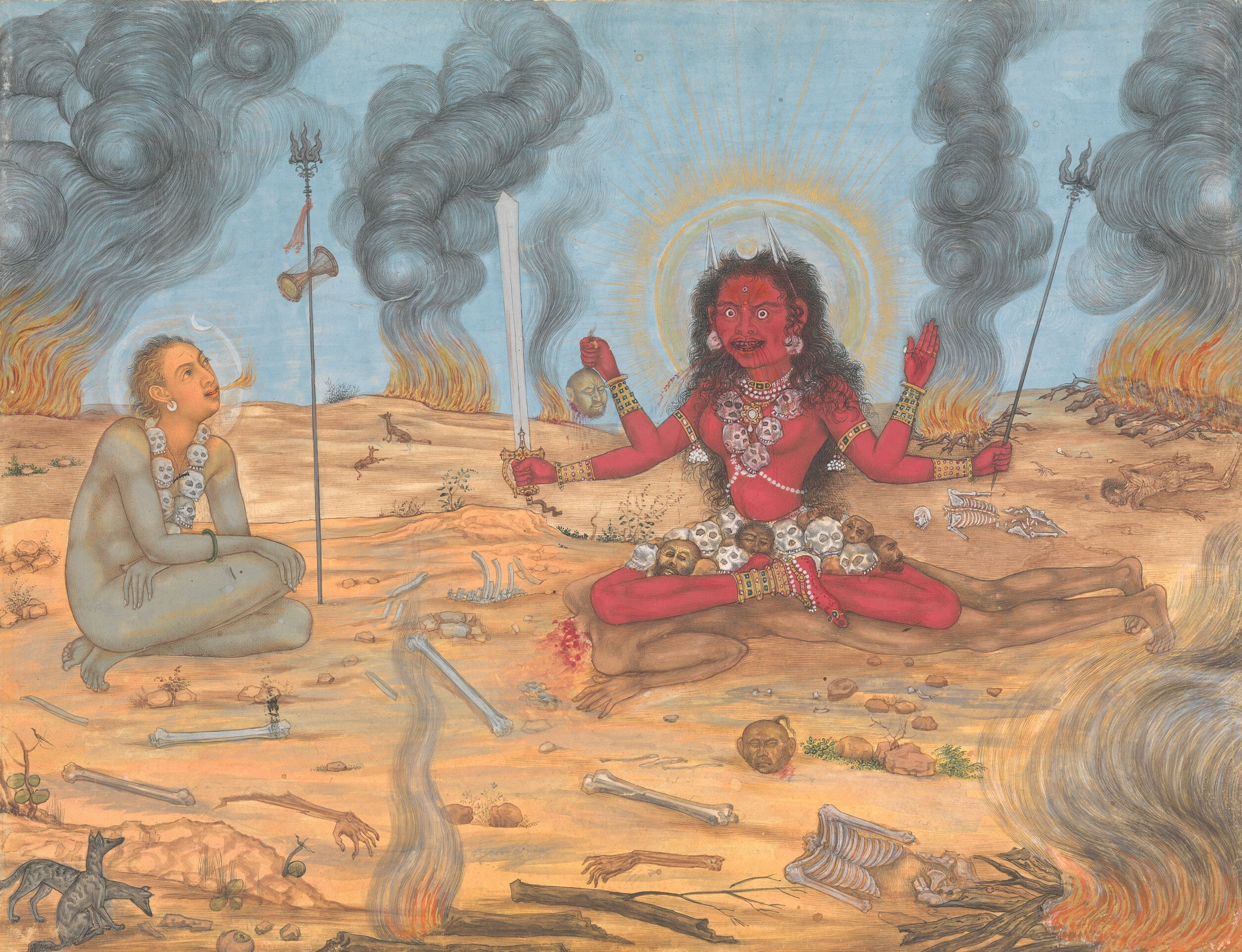
Tantric goddess Bhairavi and her consort Shiva depicted as Kāpālika ascetics, sitting in a charnel ground. Painting by Payāg from a 17th-century manuscript (c. 1630–1635), Metropolitan Museum of Art, New York City.

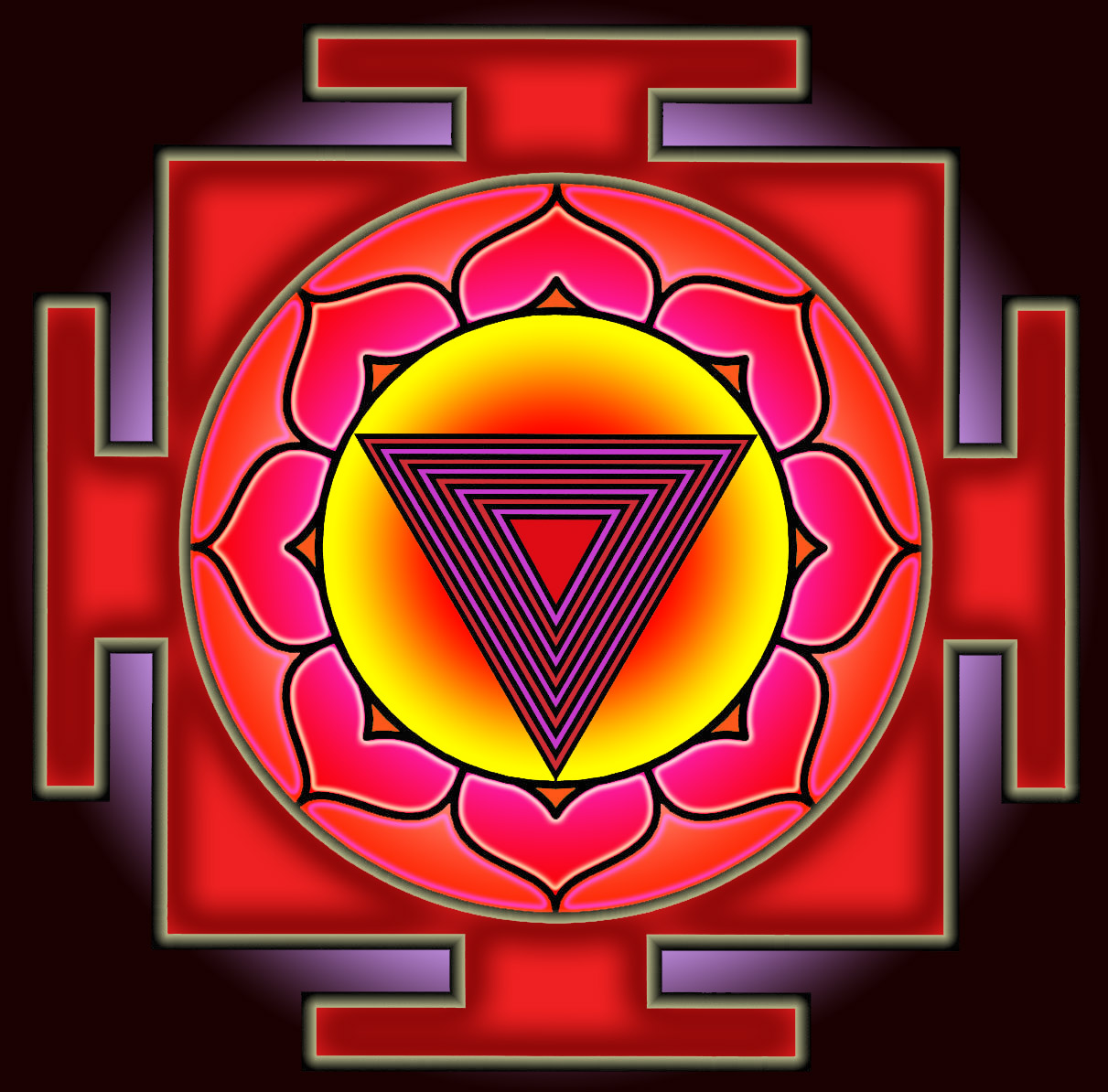
Bhairavi yantra

== See also ==
- Bhairava
- Bhramari
- Devi
- Mahakali
- Mahavidya
