= Bagalamukhi =

Deity of Hindu

- The Goddess Who Paralyzes enemies (Suspension). One of the principal incarnations of goddess Parvati
- Member of The Ten Mahavidyas
- Bagalamukhi freezing Madanasura's speech entirely
- Affiliation: Parvati, Durga, Adishakti, Devi, Sati, Mahavidyas
- Abode: Haridra Sarovar (Turmeric Ocean)
- Mantra: ह्लीं [Hleem]
- Weapon: Cudgel
- Mount: Corpse
- Consort: Shiva as Mrityunjay Bhairav

Baglamukhi or Bagalā (Sanskrit: बगलामुखी) is the female form of a personification of the mahavidyas (great wisdom/science), a group of ten Tantric deities in Hinduism.

Bagalamukhi is one of the ten forms of the Devi, symbolising potent female, primeval force.

The main temples dedicated to Bagalamukhi or Bagala Devi are located at Bankhandi, Kangra, Himachal Pradesh; Shree Pitambara Peeth, Datia, Madhya Pradesh; Shri Bagalamukhee Shakthi Peetham, Shivampet, Narsapur, Telangana; Bagalamukhi (Bandlamma) in Chandole, Guntur district, Andhra Pradesh; Bugiladhar, Ghuttu, Uttarakhand; Kamakhya Temple, Guwahati, Assam; the Baglamukhi temple of Lalitpur, Nepal, Bagalamukhi temple of Guleria, Bardiya Nepal, Baglamukhi temple Bharatpur Nepal , Maa Baglamukhi Dham Ludhiana and the Nalkheda Siddhapitham Temple, Nalkheda, Madhya Pradesh.

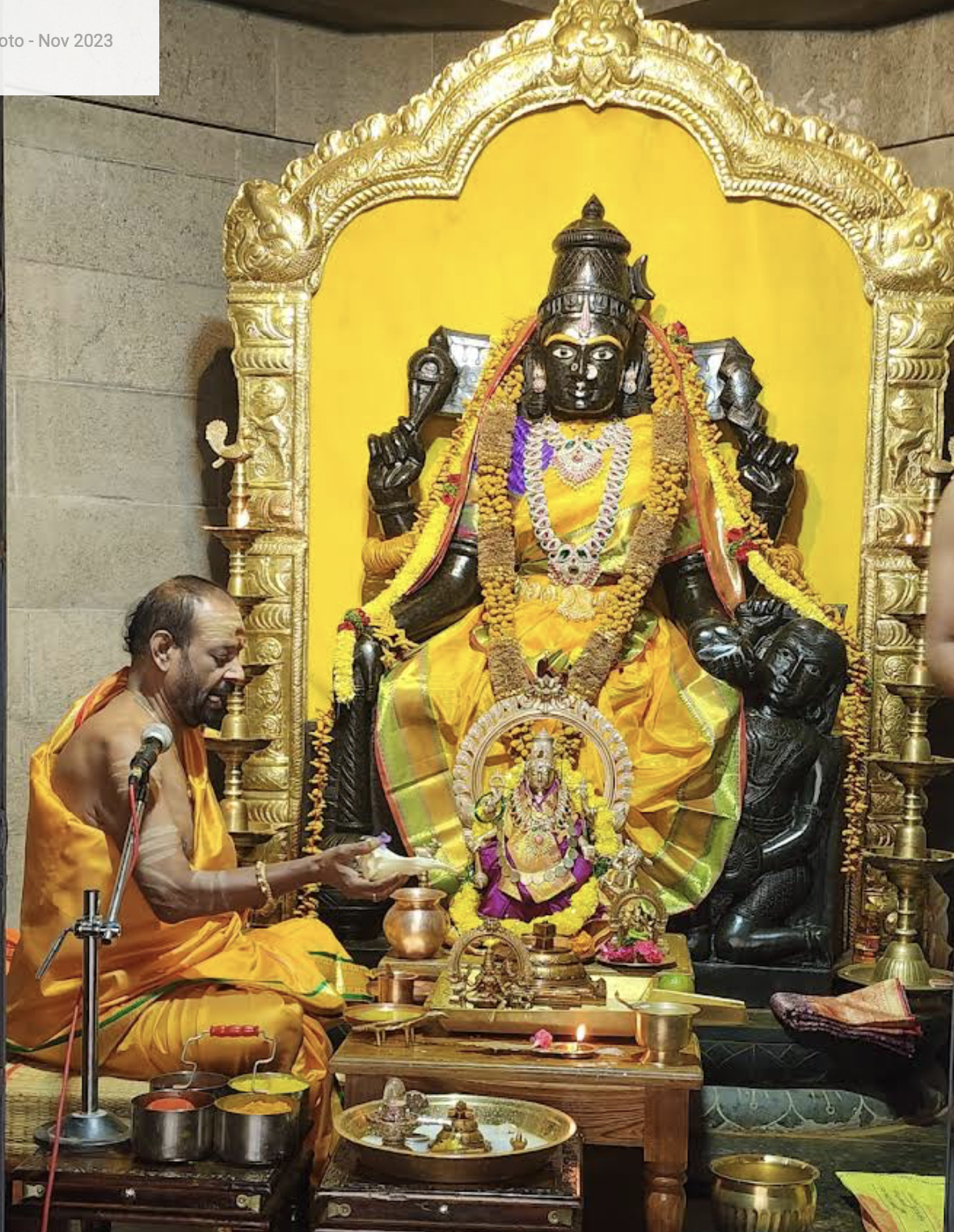
Shri Bagalamukhee Shakthi Peetham, Shivampet, Medak Dist, Telangana

== Iconography ==
Another interpretation translates her name as "Kalyani". In Kubjika Tantra there is a reference to yet another interpretation of the meaning of the name ‘Bagala’. In the initial chapter of the text, there is a verse – ‘Bakare Baruni Devi Gakare Siddhida Smrita. Lakare Prithivi Chaiba Chaitanya Prakrirtita’ (‘Ba’, the first letter of the name – ‘Bagala’, means ‘Baruni’ or ‘She Who is filled with the intoxicating mood to vanquish the demon’. ‘Ga’, the second letter, means ‘She Who grants all kinds of divine powers or siddhis and successes to human beings’. ‘La’, the third letter, means ‘She Who is the foundation of all kinds of sustaining powers in the world like the earth and is Consciousness Herself’.

Two descriptions of the goddess are found in various texts: the Dwi-Bhuja (two-handed), and the Chaturbhuja (four-handed). The Dwi-Bhuja depiction is the more common and is described as the "Soumya" or milder form. She holds a club in her right hand with which she beats a demon, while pulling his tongue out with her left hand. This image is sometimes interpreted as an exhibition of stambhana, the power to stun or paralyse an enemy into silence. This is one of the boons for which Bagalamukhi's devotees worship her. Other Mahavidya goddesses are also said to represent similar powers useful for defeating enemies, to be invoked by their worshippers through various rituals.

Bagalamukhi is also called Pitambaradevi, Shatrubuddhivinashini and Brahmastra Roopini and she turns each thing into its opposite.

The Tantrasara describes her iconography: Bagalamukhi sits in a golden throne in the midst of an ocean in an altar. Her complexion is yellow (golden). Clad in yellow clothes, she is adorned by a garland of yellow flowers and decked with yellow (golden) ornaments. She pulls the tongue of a demon by her left hand, while raising the right hand to strike him with a club. Another description says that she has four arms and a third eye. A yellow crescent moon adorns her forehead.

Though generally depicted with a human head, the goddess is sometimes described to have a head of a crane and sometimes depicted riding a crane. Sometimes, she is described associated with other birds: having a duck-head or a nose of a parrot.

== Etymology and other epithets ==
Kinsley translates Bagalamukhi as "she who has the face of a crane". Kinsley extrapolated that the crane's behaviour of standing still to catch prey is reflective of the occult powers bestowed by the goddess. Kinsley himself notes the difficulty that Goddess Bagalamukhi is rarely depicted with a crane-head or with cranes.

Another interpretation suggests that Baglamukhi is a corruption of the word Valgamukhi; valga means "bridle" or "bit". Like the bridle or bit – placed in the mouth – is used to direct a horse, Goddess Valgamukhi gives the supernatural power of control over one's foes. In this context, Goddess Valgamukhi is she "who bridles or controls the mouth of the opponent", implying their speech, which in turn is driven by their intellect.

Another etymology suggests that valga means "to paralyze" and symbolizes the power of stambhana, "paralysis" that the goddess is said to grant; this theory seems questionable to Kinsley.

Bagalamukhi is known by the popular epithet Pitambara-devi or Pitambari, "she who wears yellow clothes". The iconography and worship rituals repeatedly refer to the yellow colour.

== Legend ==
In the Satya Yuga (the first epoch in Hindu cosmology), a great storm started destroying Creation. The god Vishnu was disturbed and performed austerities to appease the goddess Parvati on shore of Haridra Sarovar, the lake of turmeric. Pleased with Vishnu, the goddess appeared and brought forth her manifestation Bagalamukhi from the lake. Bagalamukhi calmed the storm, restoring order in the universe.

Another tale records that a demon named Madan acquired Vak-siddhi, by which whatever he said came true. He misused it to trouble humans and murder people. The gods beseeched Bagalamukhi. The goddess grabbed the demon's tongue and immobilized his power. Madan requested the goddess that he be worshipped with her; the goddess granted him this boon, before slaying him.

== Symbolism and associations ==
Bagalamukhi is strongly associated with the yellow colour. She dresses in yellow clothes and ornaments. Various texts describe her affinity to the colour; yellow is an integral part of her worship rituals. Bagalamukhi is propitiated with yellow offerings by devotees dressed in yellow, seated on a yellow cloth. Yellow turmeric bead rosary are used in her japa (repetition) of her names or mantra (invocation). The colour yellow is linked to the Sun, gold, the earth, grain and fire, signifying auspiciousness, bountifulness and purity. The yellow turmeric is associated with marriage. This is why goddess Bagalamukhi is also known as Pitambhara devi.

Bagalamukhi is praised as the giver of supernatural powers (siddhis) or magical powers (riddhis meaning good fortune, prosperity, wealth)

In ‘Bagalamukhistotratram’, a part of ‘Rudrayamala’ (a famous Tantra work), there are hymns in praise of the powers of Bagalamukhi –

“Vadi Mukati Rankati Kshitipatirvaishwanarah Sheetati Krodhi Samyati Durjanah Sujanati Khsipranugah Khanjati. Garvi Khanjati Sarvaviccha Jarati Tvanmantrinaamantritah Srinitye Baglamukhi Pratidinam Tubhyam Namah" (By the effect of Your Mantra good conversationalists become speechless; rich become beggars; devastating fire gets cooled. The anger of the angry person is removed; an evil minded person becomes good. The quick moving person becomes crippled. The conceit of the conceited person is reduced. Knowledgeable person nearly becomes a fool. Salutations to the compassionate Bagalamukhi!)

== Worship ==
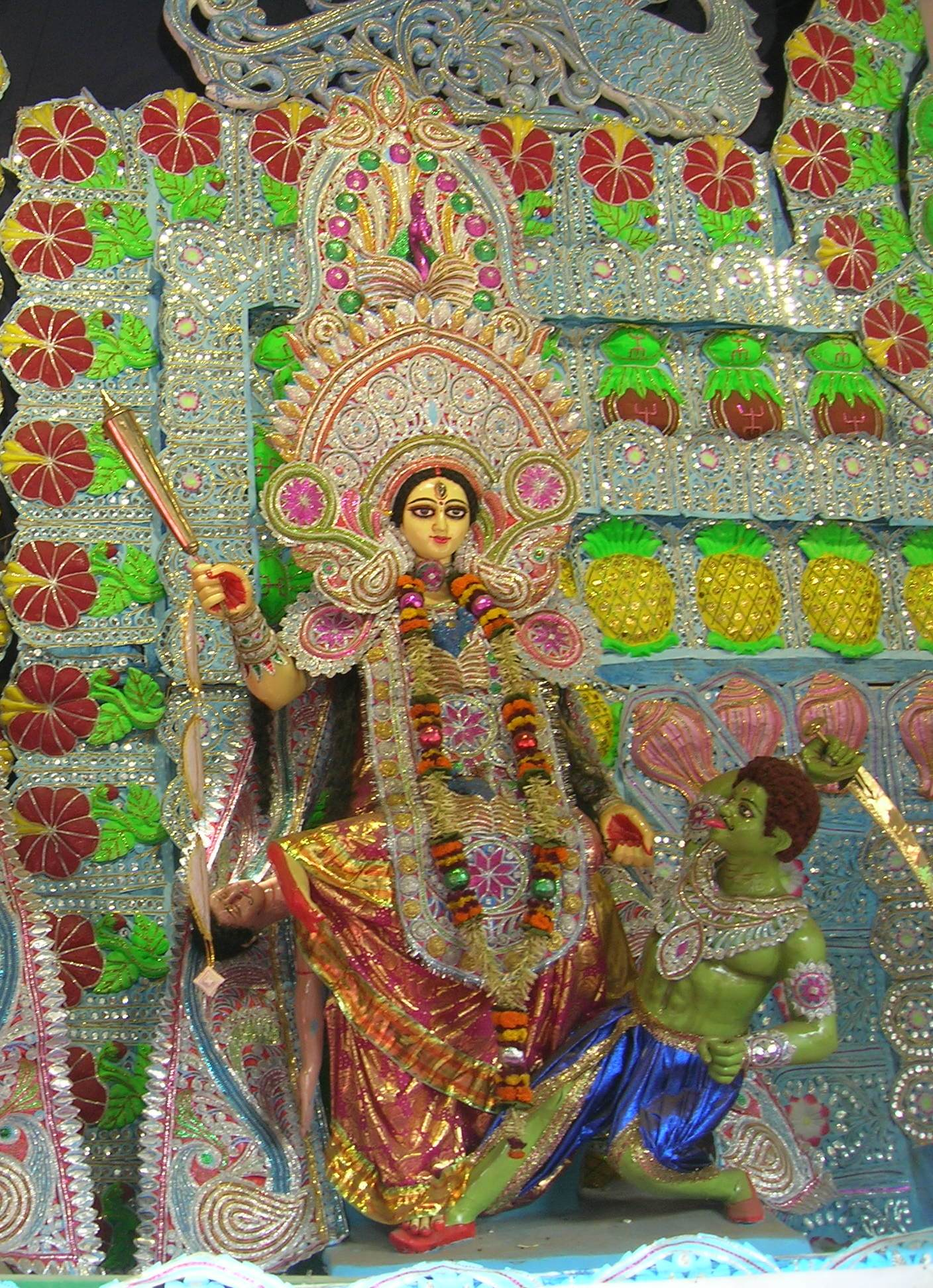
Bagalamukhi Devi in a Kali Pooja Pandal, Kolkata

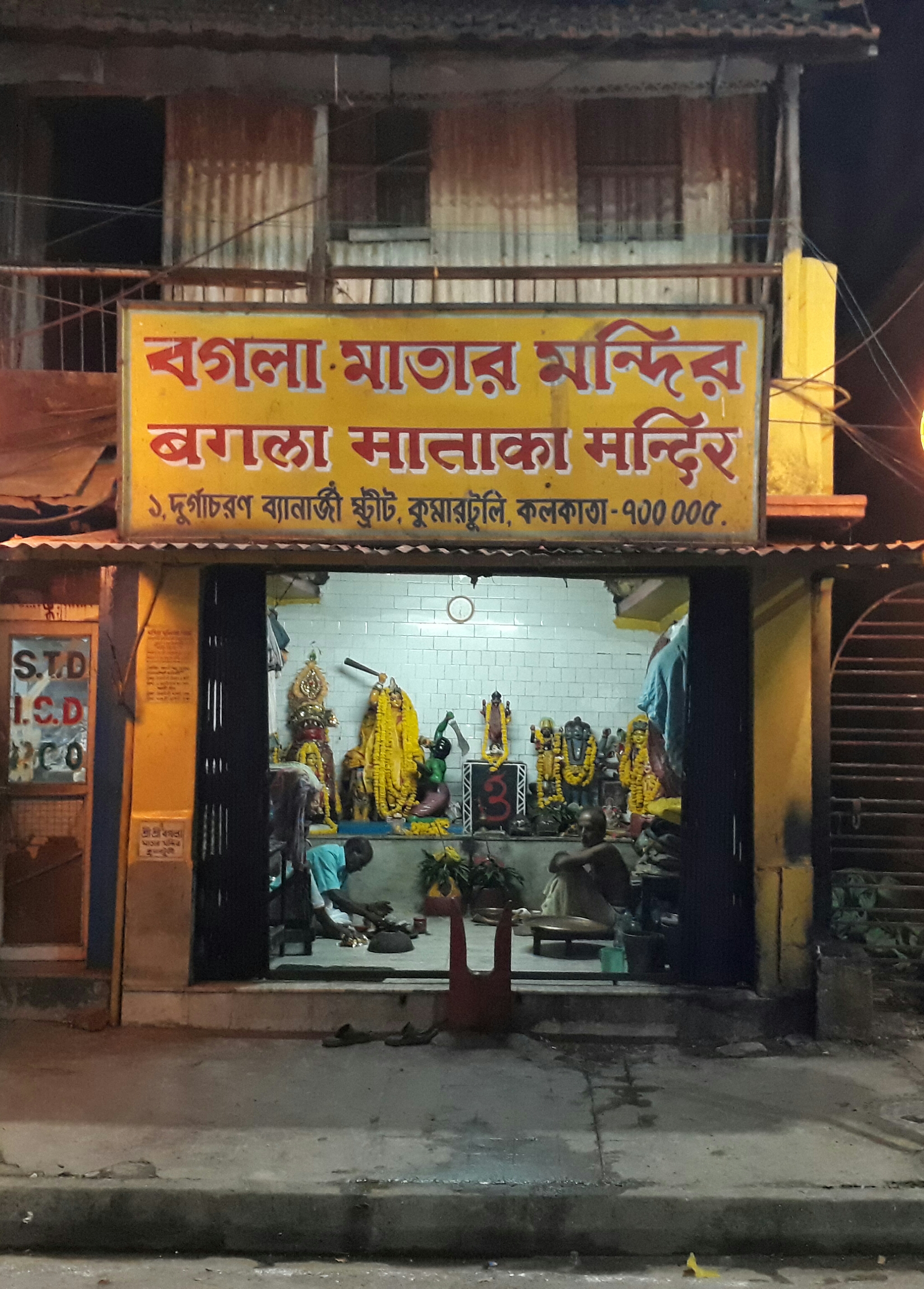
Bagala Maata Mandir at Kumortuli in Kolkata

Kamakhya Temple in Guwahati, one of the primary centers of Tantricism, consists of shrines for each of the Mahavidyas, one of which is dedicated to the Goddess Bagalamukhi, located a few hundred metres away. Major temples to the goddess are situated in the Pathankot Mandi highway NH20 at Kotla and Bankhandi Himachal Pradesh in the north, and at village Badowan near Mahilapur district Hoshiarpur Punjab India and at Nalkheda at Agar Malwa district in Madhya Pradesh and Pitambara Peeth in Datia and DusMahavidhya Temple at Nikhildham Bhojpur -Bhopal Madhya Pradesh. In South India there is a temple at Bagalapeetam, Eraiyur Road, Vallakottai in Kanchipuram district in Tamil Nadu. Sree suryamangalam, Kallidaikurichi, Papankulam village in Tirunelveli district in Tamil Nadu.

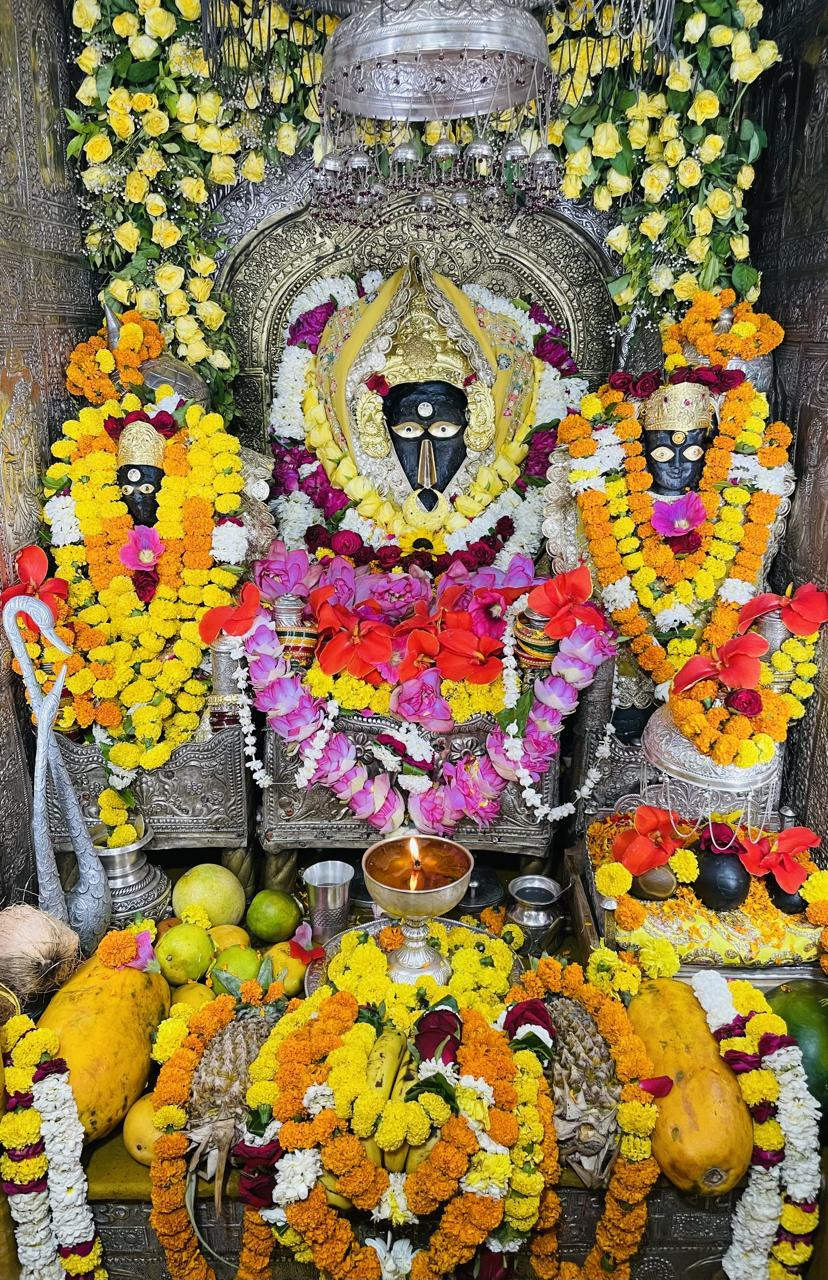
Bankhandi Temple Kangra

A lesser known temple of the goddess is situated in Somalapura (Kalyani) of Sindhanur taluk, Raichur district of North Karnataka. It is believed to be a powerful Bagulamukhi Sidhdha Shakta pitha. As per local legends, the temple was built by a great yogi after goddess' sakshaatkara fell in love with him. She promised to preside in the temple. As per another legend, the temple was built by great yogi Shri Chidanandavadhoota around 300 years ago. He composed 'Shree Devi Charitre', a popular text in Karnataka. Her prayers are said to pacify Brihaspati.

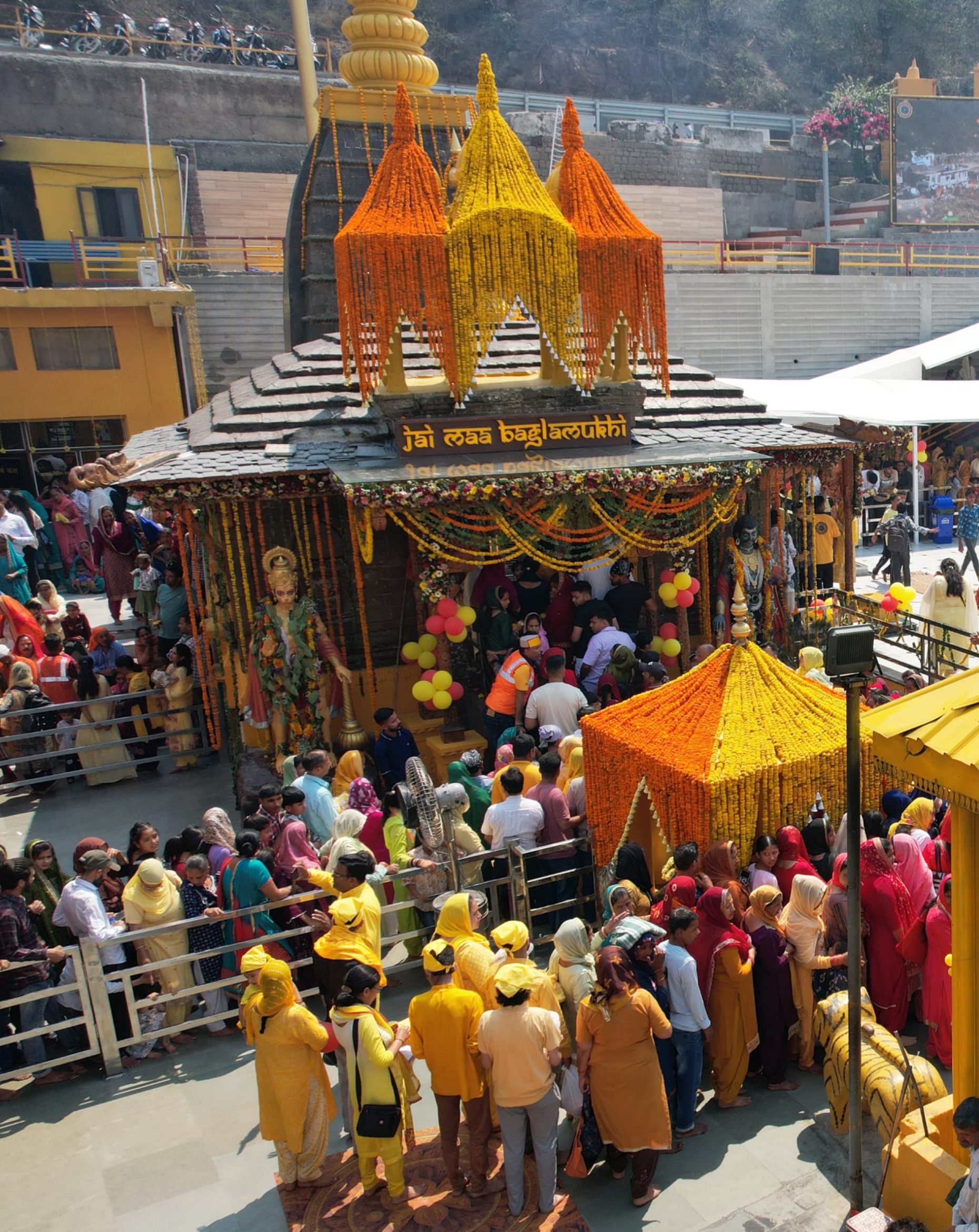
Bagalamukhi Temple at Bankhandi in Himachal Pradesh

In Virupaskhi, a small village next to Mulabagilu of Kolar district Karnataka, another shrine dedicated to the goddess, as part of temple complex of Virupakshi temple. As per folklore, the Virupaskha linga was installed by great sage Atri Maharshi, father of Shriguru Dattatreya. The linga changes its color in 3 ways from sunrise to sunset. It is believed that King Vikramaditya built the Bagulamukhi temple at Virupakshi.

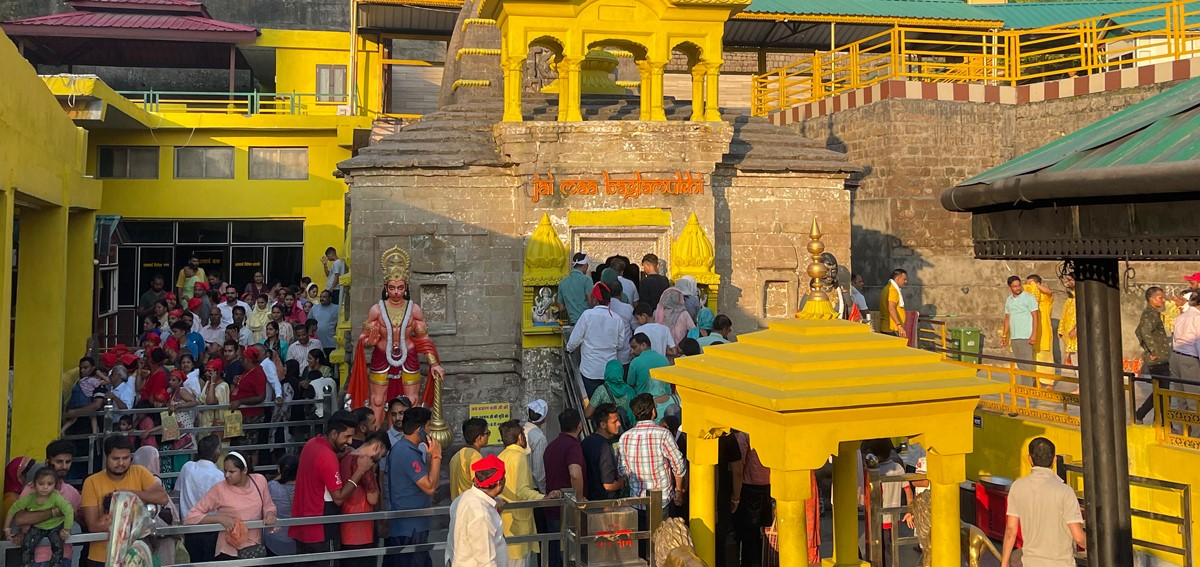
Bankhandi Temple Kangra

Whereas, the Maa Bagalamukhi Temple, Bankhandi, HP is a prominent place of worship of the goddess, thronged by huge crowds during Fridays and other festive seasons.

According to local tradition at Bankhandi temple, Rama, guided by Hanuman, worshipped Mata Baglamukhi to secure victory over the demon king Ravana. The goddess granted Rama the Brahmastra, a celestial weapon of immense destructive power. This divine gift was instrumental in Rama’s success, symbolising the victory of good over evil and demonstrating the divine support that Maa Baglamukhi Temple in Bankhandi provides to her devotees.

Furthermore, it is said that the Maa Baglamukhi Temple, Bankhandi, HP was constructed during the Dwaparyug by the Pandavas during their period of 'Agyatvas' (exile). According to legend, the Pandavas built the temple in a single night. Bhima and Arjuna worshipped Goddess Baglamukhi to seek her blessings and power.

It is believed that worshipping Maa Baglamukhi Temple in Bankhandi, Kangra district enhances one's power and diminishes enemies capabilities, rendering them helpless. This aspect of the goddess’s power underscores her role as a protector and a formidable force against adversities.

A temple devoted to Bagalamukhi is also located in the Newar city of Patan near Kathmandu, Nepal, the country where worship of tantric goddesses had royal patronage. The territory of this temple in Patan has several other shrines dedicated to Ganesha, Shiva, Saraswati, Guheswar, Bhairava, etc.

== See also ==
- Shri Bagalamukhee Shakthi Peetham, Shivampet, Medak District, Telangana
- Devi
- Mahavidya
- Bagalamukhi Temple, Nalkheda
- Bagalamukhi Temple, Bankhandi, HP
- Bagalamukhi Temple, Bugeela Dhar, Tehri Garhwal, Uttrakhand

== Bibliography ==
- Frawley, David (1994). Tantric Yoga and the Wisdom Goddesses: Spiritual Secrets of Ayurveda. Lotus Press. ISBN 978-0-910261-39-5.
- Kinsley, David R. (1988). "Tara, Chinnamasta and the Mahavidyas". Hindu Goddesses: Visions of the Divine Feminine in the Hindu Religious Tradition (1 ed.). University of California Press. ISBN 978-0-520-06339-6.
- Kinsley, David R. (1997). Tantric Visions of the Divine Feminine: The Ten Mahāvidyās. University of California Press. ISBN 978-0-520-20499-7.
- S Shankaranarayanan (2002) [1972]. The Ten Great Cosmic Powers. Samata Books. ISBN 81-85208-38-7.
