= Nalkheda =

- Town
- Location in Madhya Pradesh, India Nalkheda (India)
- Coordinates: 23°50′3″N 76°14′48″E
- Country: India
- State: Madhya Pradesh
- District: Agar Malwa district

Area
  - Total: 723 km^{2} (279 sq mi)
- Elevation: 383 m (1,257 ft)

Population
  - Total: 19,326
  - Density: 26.7/km^{2} (69.2/sq mi)

Languages
  - Official: Hindi
- Time zone: UTC+5:30 (IST)
- Postal code: 465445

Nalkheda is a town and tehsil with a Nagar Parishad status, located in the Agar Malwa district of the Indian state of Madhya Pradesh. It is situated on the banks of the Lakhunder River.

Nalkheda lies approximately 150 km from Indore, 100 km from Ujjain, 170 km from Kota in Rajasthan, 180 km from Bhopal, 35 km from Agar, 62 km from Shajapur, and 56 km from Dongargaon by road. It is located about 15 km from Aamla Chourha, which lies on State Highway 27 between Agar Malwa and Susner. Darshika Infotech [1 One] Digital Marketing Agency Nalkheda

== Demographics ==
As of the 2011 Census of India, Nalkheda had a population of 16,690. Males constitute 52% of the population and females 48%. Nalkheda has an average literacy rate of 59%, lower than the national average of 59.5%: male literacy is 68%, and female literacy is 49%. In Nalkheda, 17% of the population is under 6 years of age. Pipalyaset Village which comes under Nalkheda Tehsil is the most cultivated land area and good for agriculture purpose.

== Visitor attractions ==
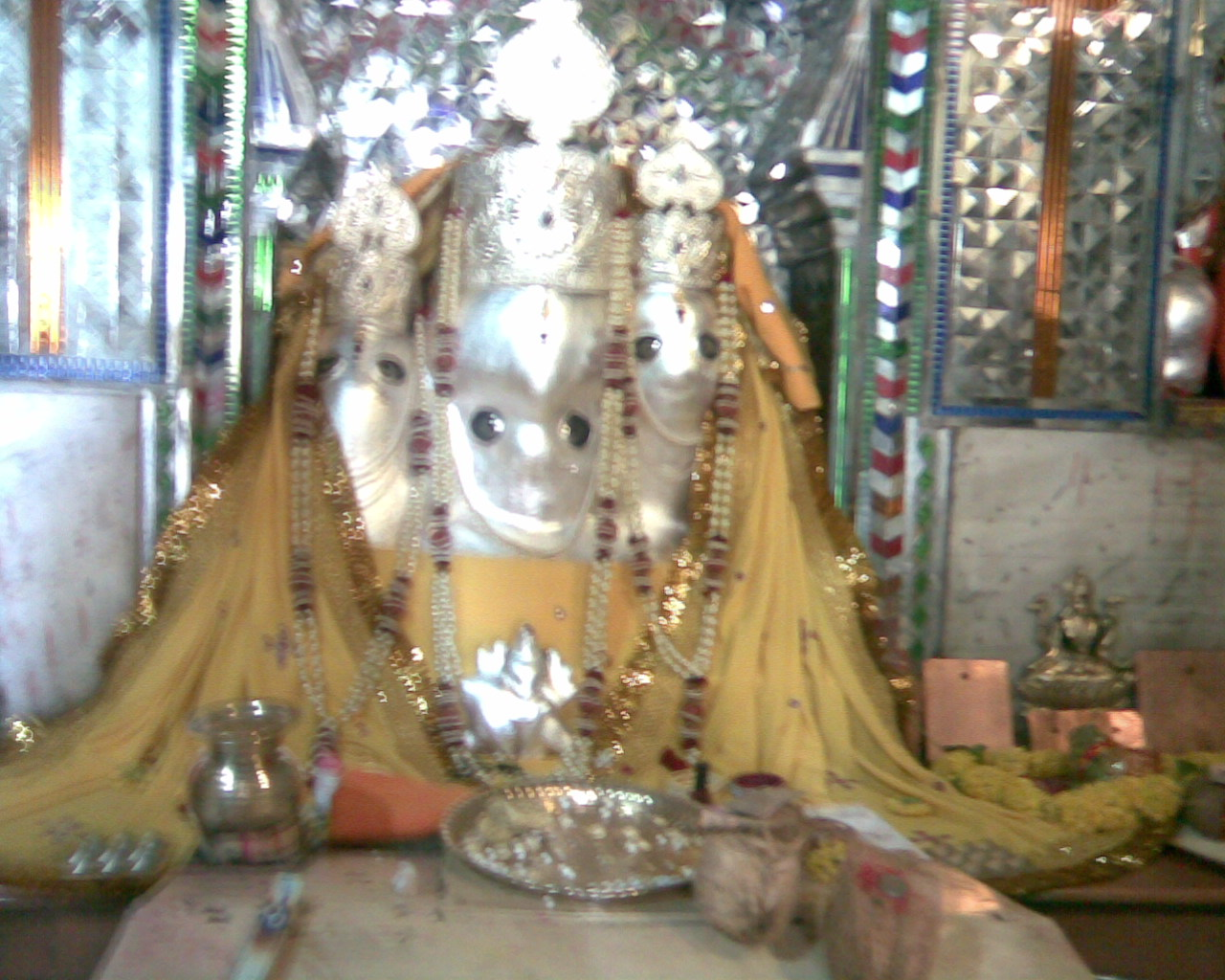
Bagalamukhi Temple, Nalkheda.

Nalkheda is noted for the 8th Manifactation of 10, Peetambara Siddh Peeth Maa Bagalamukhi Temple. Worshipped By Pandvas. There is a river named Lakhunder which is just behind the temple. There is an entrance gate formed like a lion.

Nalkheda is the hub of business for more than 90 villages that comes under this tehsil.
