= Mahavidya =

Group of ten Hindu goddesses

- Tantra, Shakti and wisdom
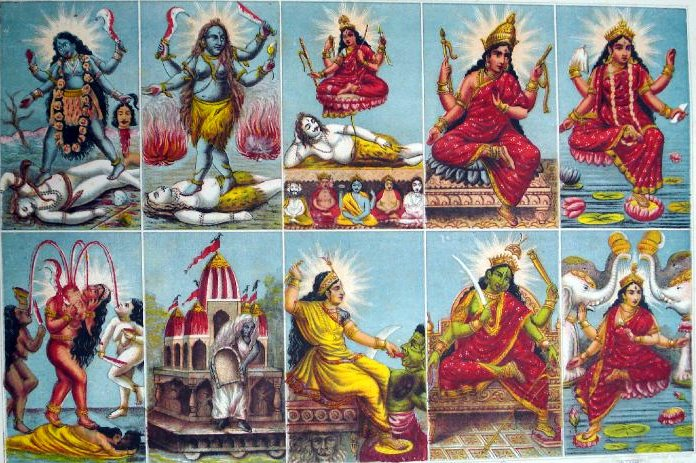
- Top: Kali, Tara, Tripura Sundari, Bhuvaneshvari, and Bhairavi; Bottom: Chhinnamasta, Dhumavati, Bagalamukhi, Matangi, and Kamala
- Devanagari: महाविद्या
- Sanskrit transliteration: Mahāvidyā
- Affiliation: Adi Shakti, Durga, Parvati, Mahadevi
- Abode: Manidvipa
- Weapon: Khaḍga, bow and arrow, Trishula, Sudarshana Chakra, Gada, shankha, ghanta
- Mount: Lotus, chariot, throne
- Festivals: Durga Puja, Kali Puja
- Consort: Shiva

The Mahavidya (Sanskrit: महाविद्या, IAST: Mahāvidyā, lit. Great Wisdoms) are a group of ten Hindu Tantric goddesses. The ten Mahavidyas are usually named in the following sequence: Kali, Tara, Tripura Sundari (Shodasi) , Bhuvaneshvari, Bhairavi, Chhinnamasta, Dhumavati, Bagalamukhi, Matangi and Kamala. Nevertheless, the formation of this group encompasses divergent and varied religious traditions that include yogini worship, Shaivism, Vaishnavism, and Vajrayana Buddhism.

The development of the Mahavidyas represents an important turning point in the history of Shaktism as it marks the rise of the Bhakti aspect in Shaktism, which reached its zenith in 1700 CE. First occurring in the post-Puranic age, around 6th century CE, it was a new theistic movement in which the supreme being was envisioned as female. A fact epitomized by texts like Devi Bhagavata Purana, especially its last nine chapters (31–40) of the seventh skandha, which are known as the Devi Gita, and soon became central texts of Shaktism.

== History ==
Shaktas believe, "the one Truth is sensed in ten different facets; the Divine Mother is adored and approached as ten cosmic personalities," the Dasa-Mahavidya ("ten-Mahavidyas"). As per another school of thought in Shaktism Mahavidyas are considered to be forms of Mahakali, in others as forms of Tripura Sundari. The Mahavidyas are considered Tantric in nature, and are usually identified as:

1. Kali – The goddess who is the ultimate form of Brahman, and the devourer of time (Supreme Deity of Kalikula systems). Mahakali is of a pitch black complexion, darker than the dark of the dead of the night. She has three eyes, representing the past, present and future. She has shining white, fang-like teeth, a gaping mouth, and her red, bloody tongue hanging from there. She has unbound, disheveled hairs. She wears tiger skin as her garment, a garland of skulls and a garland of red Hibiscus flowers around her neck, and on her belt, she was adorned with skeletal bones, skeletal hands as well as severed arms and hands as her ornamentation. She is Chaturbhuji (having four hands), two of them carry the Khadga (Ram-dao), or a sword and the Trishul and two others carry a demon head and a bowl collecting the blood dripping from a demon head.
2. Tara – The goddess who acts as a guide and a protector, and she who offers the ultimate knowledge that grants salvation. She is the goddess of all sources of energy. The energy of the sun is believed to originate from her. She manifested as the mother of Shiva after the incident of Samudra Manthana to heal him as her child. Tara is of a light blue complexion. She has disheveled hair, wearing a crown decorated with the digit of the half-moon. She has three eyes, a snake coiled comfortably around her throat, wearing the skins of tigers, and a garland of skulls. She is also seen wearing a belt supporting her skirt made of tiger-skin. Her four hands carry a lotus, scimitar, demon head and scissors. Her left foot rests on the laying down Shiva.
3. Tripura Sundari (Shodashi, Lalita) – The goddess who is "beauty of the three worlds" (Supreme Deity of Srikula systems); the "Tantric Parvati" or the "Moksha Mukta". She is the ruler of Manidvipa, the eternal supreme abode of the goddess. Shodashi is seen with a molten gold complexion, three placid eyes, a calm mien, wearing red and pink vestments, adorned with ornaments on her divine limbs and four hands, each holding a goad, lotus, a bow, and arrow. She is seated on a throne.
4. Bhuvaneshvari – The goddess as the world mother, or whose body comprises all the fourteen lokas of the cosmos. Bhuvaneshvari is of a fair, golden complexion, with three content eyes as well as a calm mien. She wears red and yellow garments, decorated with ornaments on her limbs and has four hands. Two of her four hands hold a goad and noose while her other two hands are open. She is seated on a divine, celestial throne.
5. Bhairavi – The fierce goddess. The female version of Bhairava. Bhairavi is of a fiery, volcanic red complexion, with three furious eyes, and disheveled hair. Her hair is matted, tied up in a bun, decorated by a crescent moon as well as adorning two horns, one sticking out from each side. She has two protruding tusks from the ends of her bloody mouth. She wears red and blue garments and is adorned with a garland of skulls around her neck. She also wears a belt decorated with severed hands and bones attached to it. She is also decked with snakes and serpents too as her ornamentation – rarely is she seen wearing any jewelry on her limbs. Of her four hands, two are open and two hold a rosary and book.
6. Chhinnamasta ("She whose head is severed") – The self-decapitated goddess. She chopped her own head off in order to satisfy Jaya and Vijaya (metaphors of rajas and tamas - part of the trigunas). Chinnamasta has a red complexion, embodied with a frightful appearance. She has disheveled hair. She has four hands, two of which hold a sword and another hand holding her own severed head; three blazing eyes with a frightful mien, wearing a crown. Two of her other hands hold a lasso and drinking bowl. She is a partially clothed lady, adorned with ornaments on her limbs and wearing a garland of skulls on her body. She is mounted upon the back of a copulating couple.
7. Dhumavati – The widow goddess. Dhumavati is of a smoky dark brown complexion, her skin is wrinkled, her mouth is dry, some of her teeth have fallen out, her long disheveled hair is gray, her eyes are seen as bloodshot and she has a frightening mien, which is seen as a combined source of anger, misery, fear, exhaustion, restlessness, constant hunger and thirst. She wears white clothes, donned in the attire of a widow. She is sitting in a horseless chariot as her vehicle of transportation and on top of the chariot, there is an emblem of a crow as well as a banner. She has two trembling hands, her one hand bestows boons and/or knowledge and the other holds a winnowing basket.
8. Bagalamukhi – The goddess who paralyzes enemies. Bagalamukhi has a molten gold complexion with three bright eyes, lush black hair and a benign mien. She is seen wearing yellow garments and apparel. She is decked with yellow ornaments on her limbs. Her two hands hold a mace or club and holds demon Madanasura by the tongue to keep him at bay. She is shown seated on either a throne or on the back of a crane.
9. Matangi – The Prime Minister of Lalita (in Srikula systems), sometimes called Śyāmala ("dark in complexion", usually depicted as dark blue) and the "Tantric Saraswati". Matangi is most often depicted as emerald green in complexion, with lush, disheveled black hair, three placid eyes and a calm look on her face. She is seen wearing red garments and apparel, bedecked with various ornaments all over her delicate limbs. She is seated on a royal throne and she has four hands, three of which hold a sword or scimitar, a skull and a veena (a musical instrument). Her one hand bestows boons to her devotees.
10. Kamala (Kamalatmika) – She who dwells in lotuses; sometimes called the "Tantric Lakshmi". Kamala is of a molten gold complexion with lush black hair, three bright, placid eyes, and a benevolent expression. She is seen wearing red and pink garments and apparel and bedecked with various ornaments and lotuses all over her limbs. She is seated on a fully bloomed lotus, while of her four hands, two hold lotuses while two grant her devotees' wishes and assure protection from fear.

== Origin ==
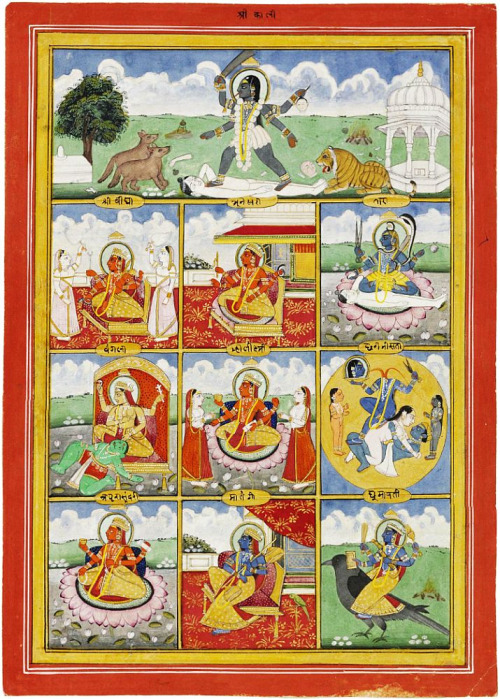
The ten Mahavidyas, Rajasthan. Top row: Kali. Second row (l→r): Bhairavi, Bhuvaneshvari, Tara. Third row (l→r): Bagalamukhi, Shodashi, Chhinnamasta. Last row (l→r):Kamalatmika, Matangi, Dhumavati

All of the Mahavidyas reside in Manidvipa, which is the celestial abode of Mahadevi, the supreme goddess, according to the Shaktism tradition in Hinduism. The Maha bhagavata Purana and Brihaddharma Purana however, list Shodashi (Sodasi) as Tripura Sundari, which is simply another name for the same goddess. The Todala-Tantra associates the Mahavidyas with the Dashavatara, the ten avatars of Vishnu, in chapter ten. They are as follows:

Todala-Tantra Association between the Mahavidyas and the Dashavatara
No.	Mahavidya names	Dashavatara names
1.	Kali	Krishna
2.	Tara	Matsya
3.	Tripura Sundari	Parashurama
4.	Bhuvaneshvari	Vamana
5.	Bhairavi	Balarama
6.	Chhinnamasta	Narasimha
7.	Dhumavati	Varaha
8.	Bagalamukhi	Kurma
9.	Matangi	Rama
10	Kamala	Buddha

The Guhyati guyha-tantra associates the Mahavidyas with the Dashavatara differently, and states that the Mahavidyas are the source from which the avatars of Vishnu arise.

Guhyati Guyha-Tantra Association between the Mahavidyas and the Dashavatara
No.	Mahavidya names	Dashavatara names
1.	Kali	Krishna
2.	Tara	Rama
3.	Tripura Sundari	Kalki
4.	Bhuvaneshvari	Varaha
5.	Bhairavi	Narasimha
6.	Chhinnamasta	Parashurama
7.	Dhumavati	Vamana
8.	Bagalamukhi	Kurma
9.	Matangi	Buddha
10	Kamala	Matsya

== Mention in Scriptures ==
- Rudra Yamala Tantra: Describes the origin and powers of Dashamahavidya in detail.
- Devi Bhagavata Purana: In the Book 7 (chapters 31–40), there is elaboration of the divine play of Devi as the Ten Mahavidyas.
- Kalika Purana: Details the worship of Kali and other Mahavidyas.
- Brahmanda Purana: Refers to Lalita Tripura Sundari as the head of all Mahavidyas.
- Shakta Upanishads: Reference to the symbolic aspects of Mahavidyas, especially Matangi and Chhinnamasta.

== Gallery ==
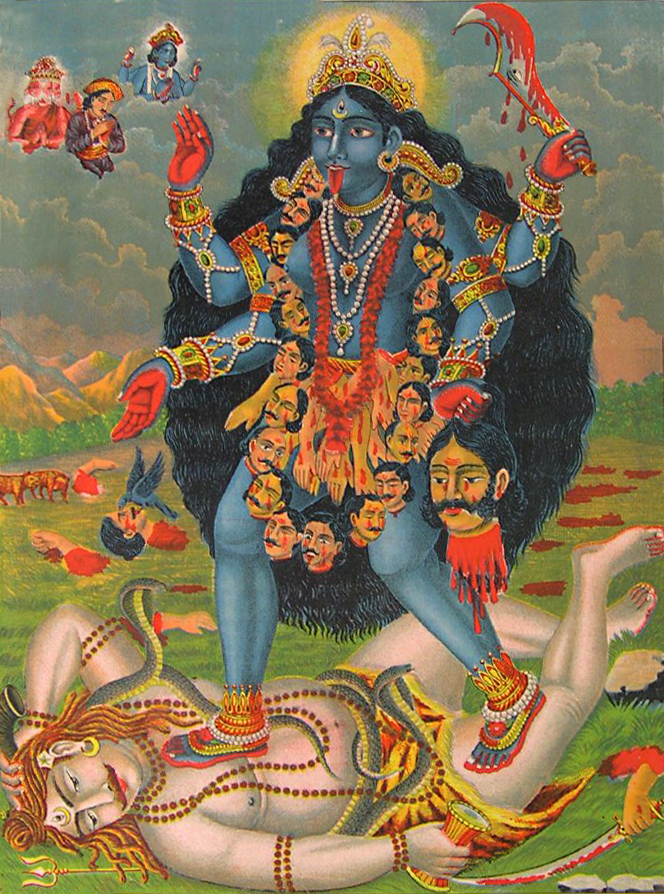
Kali standing on lord Shiva and getting blessed by the gods.

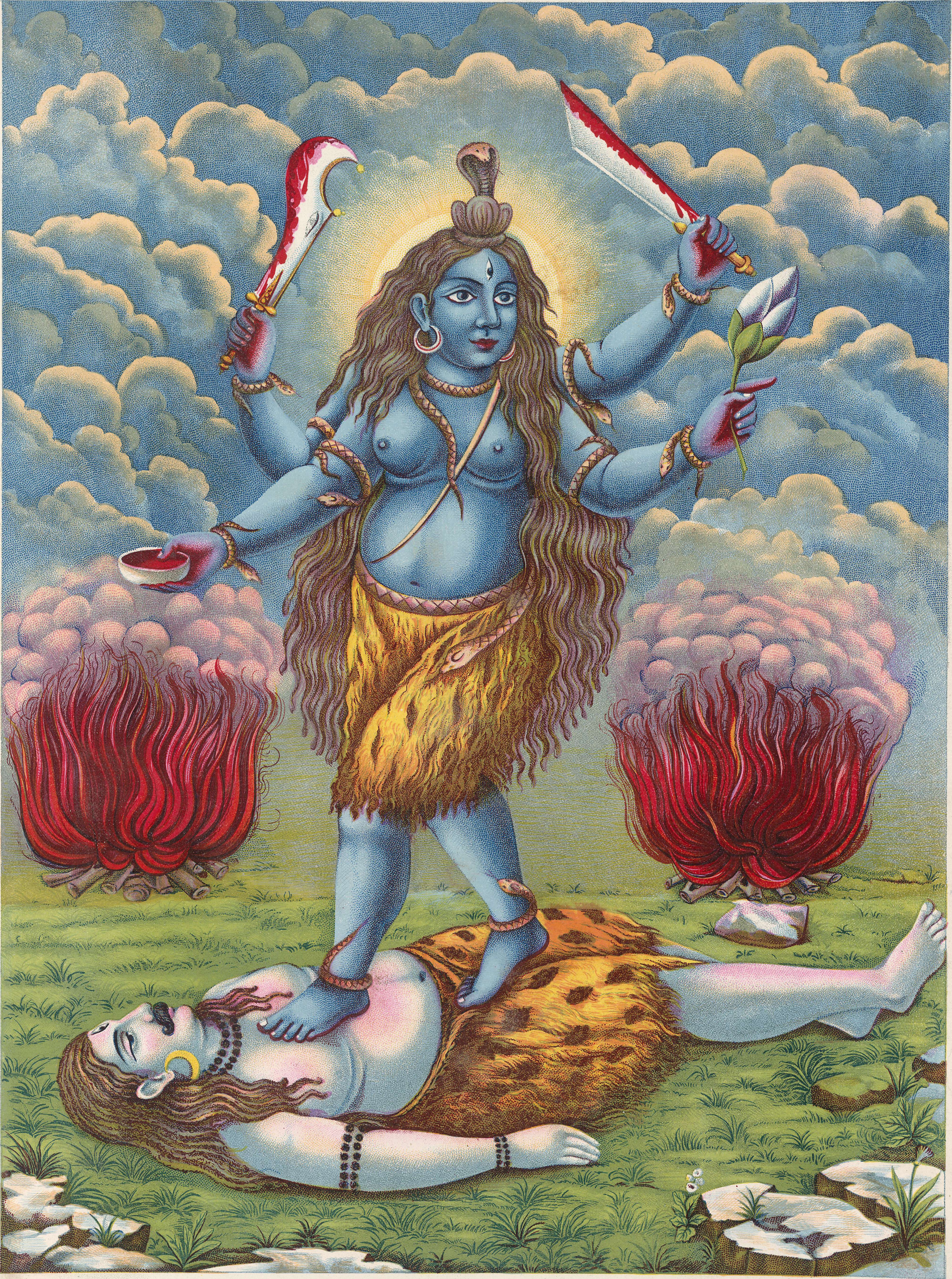
Tara standing on lord Shiva, four-armed. Lithograph from Chore Bagan Art Studio.

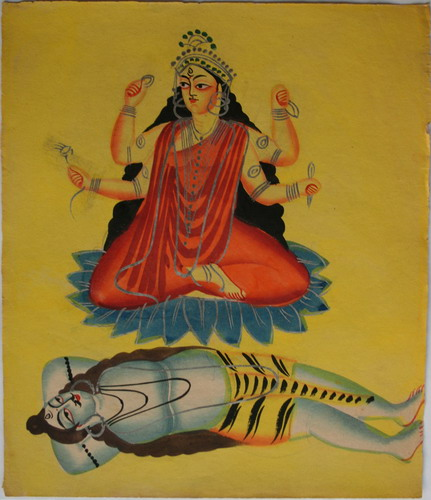
Shodashi emerging four-armed above from Lord Shiva, sitting on a blue lotus flower in a watercolor Kalighat painting.

The most common depiction of goddess Bhuvaneshvari in her cosmic form.

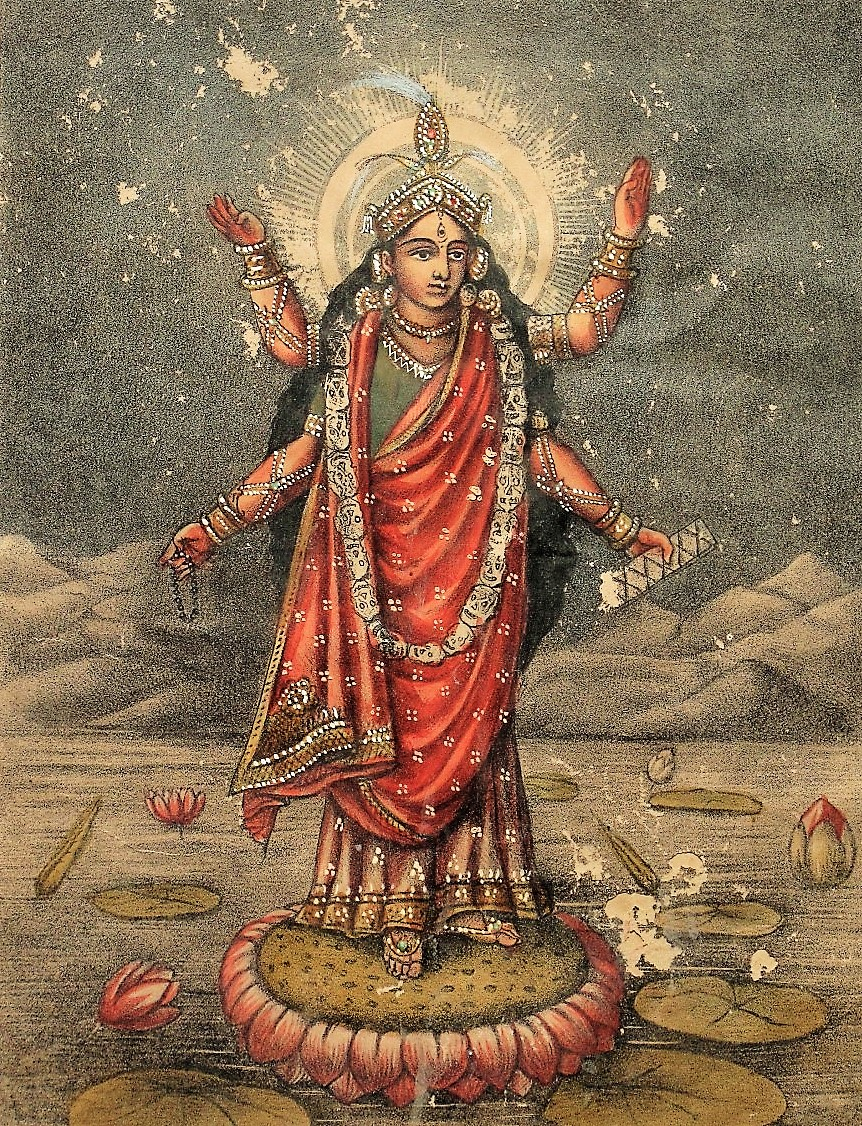
The goddess Bhairavi in a c. 1880s lithograph.

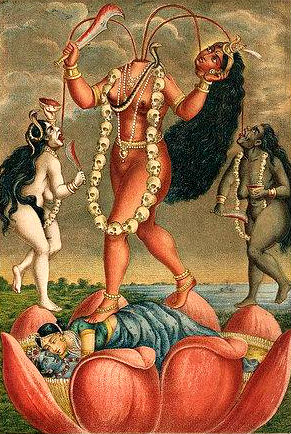
Chinnamasta in a Bengali lithograph from the 19th century.

A Bengali depiction of the widow goddess Dhumavati.

The goddess Bagalamukhi freezing Madanasura's speech (Vak Siddhi)

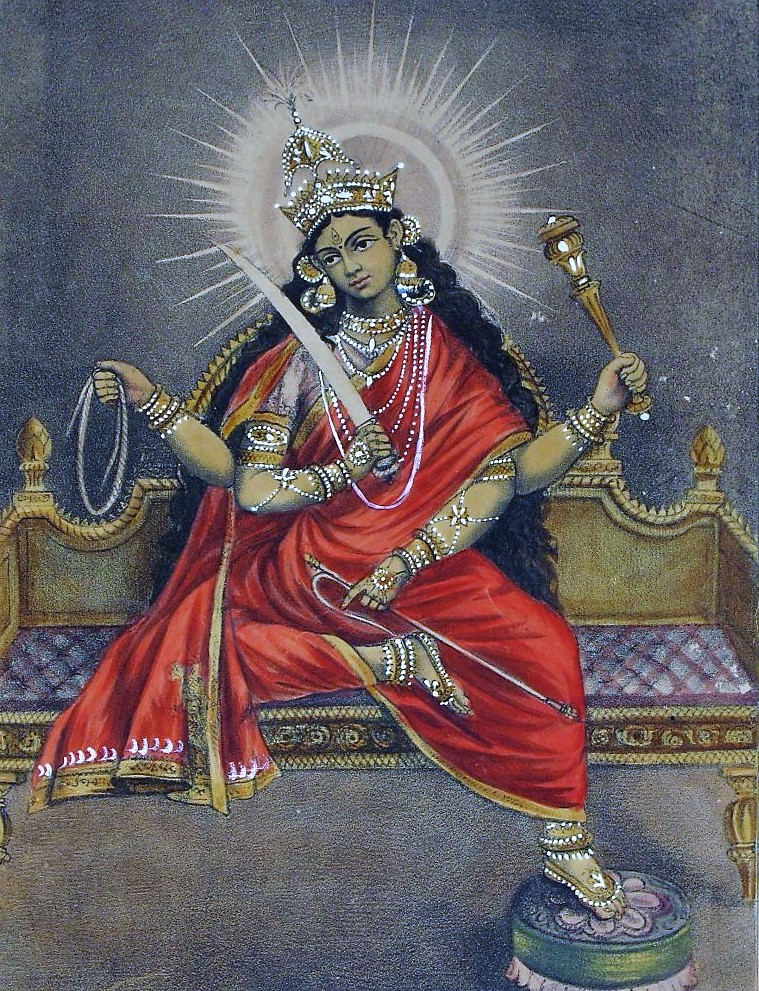
Late 19th century lithograph depicting goddess Matangi with various weapons such as a sword and a club

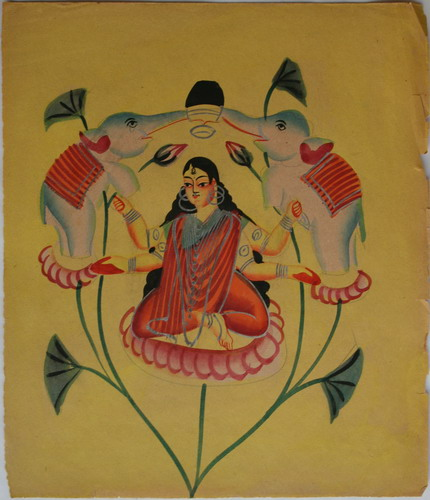
Kamalatmika showered by elephants in a Kalighat painting

== See also ==
- Shaktism
- Navadurga
- Navaratri
- Matrikas

== Bibliography ==
- Brown, Charles Mackenzie (1998). The Devī Gītā: The Song of the Goddess. SUNY Press. ISBN 978-0-791-439401.
- Daniélou, Alain (1991). The Myths and Gods of India: The Classic Work on Hindu Polytheism from the Princeton Bollingen Series. Inner Traditions / Bear & Co. ISBN 978-0-89281-354-4.
- Khandelwal, S.N. (2012). Todal Tantra Nirvan Tantra. Chaukhamba. ISBN 978-9-381-484104.
- Kinsley, David R. (1997). Tantric Visions of the Divine Feminine: The Ten Mahavidyas. Berkeley: University of California Press. ISBN 978-0-520-204997.
- Pintchman, Tracy (2001). Seeking Mahadevi: Constructing the Identities of the Hindu Great Goddess. State University of New York Press. ISBN 978-0-7914-5007-9.
- Rashinkar, Vinita (2023). Dasa Mahavidya: The Ten Great Tantric Wisdom Goddesses. Notion Press. ISBN 979-8-890-669605.
- Satpathy, Sarbeswar (1992). Dasa Mahavidya & Tantra Sastra. Punthi Pustak. ISBN 978-8-185-094588.
- Shankarnarayanan, S (1972). The Ten Great Cosmic Powers: Dasa Mahavidyas (4 ed.). Chennai: Samata Books. pp. 4–5. ISBN 978-8-185-208381.
- Shin, Jae-Eun (2018). Change, Continuity and Complexity: The Mahavidyas in East Indian Sakta Traditions. London: Routledge. ISBN 978-1-138-32690-3.
- Tripathi, Rudradev (2017). रुद्रयामल तंत्र : Rudrayamala Tantra (in Sanskrit and Hindi). Ranjan Publications. ISBN 978-81-88230-35-8.
