= Chhinnamasta =

Hindu goddess

- Goddess of Sovereign Truth, Awakened Kundalini, and the Severance of Illusion
- Member of The Ten Mahavidyas
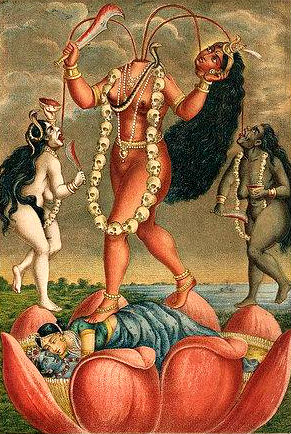
- Chhinnamasta, 19th century painting
- Devanagari: छिन्नमस्ता
- Affiliation: Mahadevi, Mahavidya, Devi, Parvati
- Abode: Cremation ground
- Weapon: knife or scimitar
- Consort: Kabandha Shiva

Chhinnamasta (Sanskrit: छिन्नमस्ता, Chinnamastā :"She whose head is severed"), often spelled Chinnamasta, and also called Chhinnamastika, Chhinnamasta Kali, Prachanda Chandika and Jogani Maa (in western states of India), is a Hindu goddess (Devi). She is one of the Mahavidyas, ten goddesses from the esoteric tradition of Tantra, and a ferocious aspect of Mahadevi, the Hindu mother goddess. The self-decapitated nude goddess, usually standing or seated on a divine copulating couple, holds her own severed head in one hand and a scimitar in another. Three jets of blood spurt out of her bleeding neck and drunk by her severed head and two attendants.

Chhinnamasta symbolises both the life-giving and life-slaying aspects of Devi. She is considered both a symbol of sexual self-control and an embodiment of sexual energy, depending upon interpretation. She represents death, temporality, and destruction as well as life, immortality, and recreation. The goddess conveys spiritual self-realization and the awakening of the kundalini : spiritual energy. The legends of Chhinnamasta emphasise her self-sacrifice — sometimes coupled with a maternal element — sexual dominance, and self-destructive fury.

Chhinnamasta is worshipped in the Kalikula sect of Shaktism, the Goddess-centric tradition of Hinduism. Though Chhinnamasta enjoys patronage as one of the Mahavidyas, temples devoted to her and public worship are rare; temples dedicated to the goddess are found mostly in Nepal and eastern India. However, she is a significant Tantric deity, well known and worshipped among esoteric Tantric practitioners. Chhinnamasta is closely related to Chinnamunda : the severed-headed form of the Tibetan Buddhist goddess Vajrayogini.

== Origins ==
The Hindu Chhinnamasta appears as a significant deity in Tantric and Tibetan Buddhism, where she is called Chinnamunda ("she with the severed head") or Trikaya-vajrayogini ("triple-bodied Vajrayogini"). Chinnamunda is the severed-head form of goddess Vajrayogini (or Vajravarahi, a ferocious form of Vajrayogini), who is depicted similarly. The name "Chhinnamasta" is also used as a generic name for goddess icons which do not have heads, such as those at Chinnamasta Bhagawati, Na-kati Bhavani shrine in Aurangabad district, Bihar and the goddess shrine in Uchchaith, Madhubani district, Bihar; these goddesses are not identified with the mahavidya Chhinnamasta. (Note: The icon of Chinnamasta Bhagawati, also known as Shakhada Bhagwati, was found in the spot where her temple currently stands, digging for construction. The icon's head was broken. The icon was consecrated and a temple built; the broken head was replaced by a gold mask, although a silver mask is generally worn by the goddess currently.) (Note: The Na-Kati Bhavani icon is associated with Kavyamata, whose head was severed and killed by the god Vishnu and later resurrected by her husband, the sage Bhrigu. The goddess icon depicts a decapitated woman sitting with joined hands and her head on the ground. Though she is also called Chhinnamasta by devotees, the naming is erroneous, according to the priest.) (Note: The goddess icon at Uchchaith is four-armed and stands upon a lotus over a lion. The head is broken, so she is called Chhinnamasta Durga. She is also identified with Durga's form Siddhidatri and the goddess Kali. She is associated as the goddess who blessed the Sanskrit poet and playwright Kalidasa.)

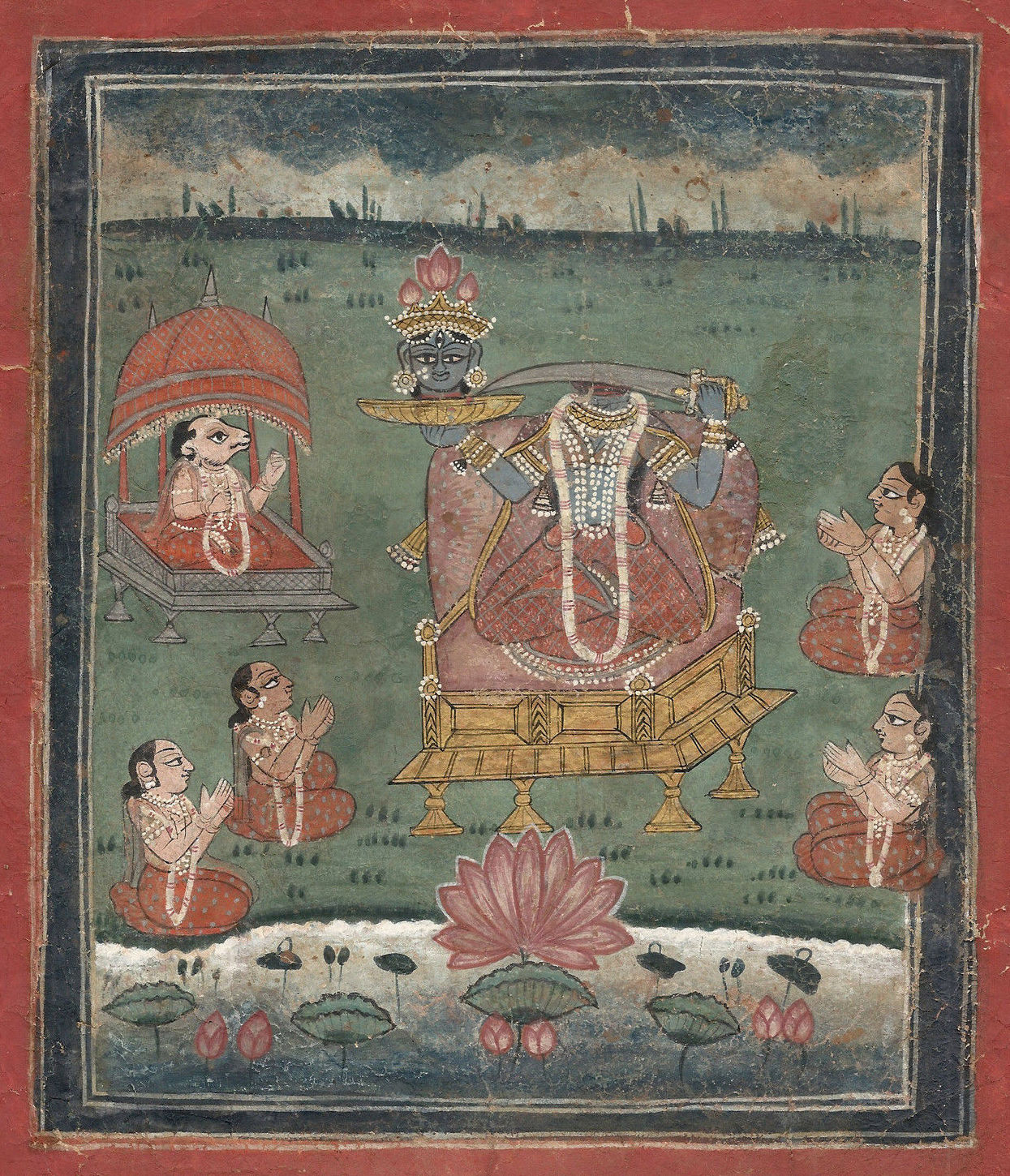
Chhinnamasta depicted enthroned appears in a benign form contrary to her traditional description, Bundi painting, c. 1775.

The theme of self-decapitation and the severed head is recurring in Indian mythology. For example, legends from the Simhasana Dvatrimsika and the Kathasaritsagara speak of how the hero offers blood from his throat as an offering to a goddess. Rajasthani folk tales and songs tell about of warrior-heroes (jhumjharji or bhomiya) who cuts off his head before the war or is decapitated in action, but battles on— without his head— slaying foes until he avenges his beheading and dies. The decapitated body and head motif is not unique to Hinduism and Buddhism and appears across the world, including the Cephalophore saints of Christianity and in Celtic culture.

=== Buddhist Origins ===
Buddhist texts recount the birth of Chinnamunda. One tale tells of Krishnacharya's disciples, two Mahasiddha ("great perfected ones") sisters, Mekhala and Kanakhala, who severed their heads, offered them to their guru, and then danced. The goddess Vajrayogini also appeared in this form and danced with them. Another story recalls how the Mahasiddha princess Lakshminkara, cut off her head as a punishment from the king and roamed with it in the city, where citizens extolled her as Chinnamunda-Vajravarahi.

In the early 20th century, Benoytosh Bhattacharya— an expert on Tantra and the then director of the Oriental Institute of Baroda— studied various texts such as the Buddhist Sadhanamala (1156 CE), the Hindu Chhinnamastakalpa (uncertain date), and the Tantrasara by Krishnananda Agamavagisha (late 16th century). In the Sadhanamala, the goddess is called Sarvabuddha ("all-awakened"), and is attended by Vajravaironi and Vajravarnini; in the Hindu Tantrasara, she is called Sarvasiddhi ("all-accomplished"), and is accompanied by attendants Dakini, Vaironi, and Varnini. In the Chhinnamastakalpa, she is called Sarvabuddhi ("all-enlightened") and her attendants retain their Buddhist names. Bhattacharyya concluded that the Hindu Chhinnamasta originated from the Buddhist Chinnamunda, who was worshipped by at least the 7th century. This is in spite of the fact that the former wears a serpent as a sacred thread and has an added copulating couple in the icon.

=== Other Influences ===
While Bhattacharyya's view is mostly undisputed, some scholars such as S. Shankaranarayanan— author of The Ten Great Cosmic Powers— attribute Chhinnamasta to Vedic (ancient Hindu) antecedents. Sukumari Bhattacharji, author of The Indian Theogony, claims that the Vedic goddess Nirrti's functions were inherited by later Hindu goddesses Kali, Chamunda, Karali, and Chhinnamasta. Hindu literature first mentions Chhinnamasta in the upapurana Shakta Maha-bhagavata Purana (c. 950 CE) and the Devi-Bhagavata Purana (9th–12th century). Elisabeth A. Benard, the author of Chinnamastā: The Aweful Buddhist and Hindu Tantric Goddess, (Note: The book is referred to as "the first monograph to examine the rituals, symbolisms, and iconographic conventions" of Chhinnamasta.) says that whatever her origins may be, it is clear that Chhinnamasta/Chinnamunda was known in the 9th century and worshipped by Mahasiddhas. Though essentially agreeing with Bhattacharyya's view, Karel R. van Kooij, former Professor of South Asian art history at Leiden University, goes further and associates the iconography of Chhinnamasta with the Tantric goddesses Varahi and Chamunda.

David Kinsley, an expert on Hindu goddesses and former professor of religion at McMaster University, agrees with the Buddhist origin theory, but also sees other influences. Ancient Hindu goddesses, who are depicted nude and headless or faceless, may have also influenced the development of Chhinnamasta. These goddesses are mainly depicted headless to focus on the display of their sexual organs, thus signifying sexual vigour, but they do not explain the self-decapitation theme.

Other nude Hindu goddesses who might have inspired Chhinnamasta are the malevolent war goddess Kotavi and the South-Indian hunting goddess Korravai. Kotavi, sometimes described as a Matrika ("mother goddess"), is nude, dishevelled, wild, and awful in appearance. She is mentioned in the scriptures Vishnu Purana and Bhagavata Purana, often as a foe of the god Vishnu. The ferocious, wild Korravai is the goddess of war and victory. However, both goddesses are linked to battlefields, while Chhinnamasta is not. Kinsley points out that while there are several bloodthirsty, nude, and wild goddesses and demonesses in Hindu mythology, Chhinnamasta is the only goddess who displays the self-decapitation motif.

The beheading and rejoining motif also appears in the tale of the goddess Renuka; however the self-decapitation is missing in the legend. Instead, Renuka's son Parashurama decapitates her. (Note: Renuka is the wife of the sage Jamadagni. Once, seeing a celestial king engaged in sexual enjoyment with a nymph, Renuka developed lust to enjoy similar experience with her husband or lusted for a moment for the king. As a result, she lost her effulgence gained by the power of her non-attachment and chastity. On the order of his father, Renuka's youngest son Parashurama beheads her after his four elder brothers refuse. Jamadagni burns his four elder sons by his fiery glance for their non-compliance. Pleased with Parashurama's obedience, the sage grants him a boon; Parashurama asks that his mother and his brothers be brought back to life, which is materialized. Renuka is purified and venerated as a goddess henceforth.) In the context of her legend, Renuka is given the epithet "Chhinnamasta" ("She whose head is severed").

== Legends and textual references ==
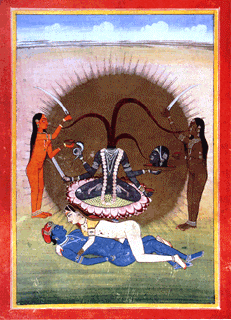
An 18th-century painting from Rajasthan depicts Chhinnamasta as black, as described in the Pranatoshini Tantra legend. She is seated on a copulating couple.

Chhinnamasta is often named as the fifth or sixth Mahavidya— a group of ten fearsome goddesses from the Hindu esoteric tradition of Tantra— with hymns identifying her as a fierce aspect of Devi, the Hindu mother goddess. While discussing Mahavidya as a group, Chhinnamasta is associated with rajas (in the Kamadhenu Tantra and the Maha-nirvana Tantra) or sattva (based on her lighter complexion). Professor David Kinsley says that three Mahavidyas — Kali, Tara, and Chhinnamasta — are prominent among Mahavidya depictions and lists, but that Chhinnamasta barely has an independent existence outside the group. The Guhyatiguhya-Tantra (c. 9th century) equates the god Vishnu's ten avatars with the ten Mahavidyas; the man-lion avatar Narasimha is described to have arisen from Chhinnamasta. A similar list in Mundamala Tantra (pre-16th century) equates Chhinnamasta with the avatar Parashurama.

Chhinnamasta appears in two distinct set of legends: the origin myths of Mahavidyas as a group and those explaining the genesis of Chhinnamasta as an individual goddess.

=== Mahavidyas as a group ===
A story from the Shakta Maha-Bhagavata Purana and the Brihaddharma Purana (13th century) narrates the creation of all Mahavidyas, including Chhinnamasta. The story is as follows: Sati, the daughter of Daksha, is the first wife of the god Shiva. When she and Shiva are not invited to the fire sacrifice organized by her father, she is insulted and insists on attending, despite Shiva's protests. After futile attempts to convince Shiva to grant his consent for her to attend, the enraged Sati assumes a fierce form, transforming into the Mahavidyas, who surround Shiva from the ten cardinal directions. As per the Shakta Maha-bhagavata Purana, Chhinnamasta stands to the right of Shiva, interpreted as the east or the west; the Brihaddharma Purana describes her as appearing to the rear of Shiva in the west. (Note: The legend of Daksha yagna continues further. After forcibly extracting Shiva's consent by threatening him by the Mahavidyas, Sati arrives uninvited to Daksha's yagna, along with a retinue of Shiva's followers. Daksha ignored Sati and vilified Shiva. Unable to withstand this insult, Sati sacrificed herself in the fire. The wild, grief-stricken Shiva wandered the universe with her half-burnt corpse. Finally, Vishnu dismembered her body into 51 parts, each of which fell on different places on the earth, each creating a Shakta pitha shrine.)

In similar legends, the Mahavidyas arise from the wrath of other goddesses, specifically, Parvati (the second wife of Shiva and the reincarnation of Sati) and Kali (the principal Mahavidya). In one legend, Shiva and Parvati are living in the house of Parvati's father. Shiva wants to leave, but Parvati creates the ten fierce Mahavidyas who appear from ten directions and prevent him from leaving. In another legend, Shiva is living with Kali, identified as Shiva's consort in this context, but becomes tired of her and wants to leave. Kali creates the Mahavidyas who also obstruct his path from ten directions. Kali enlightens him and he ceases trying to leave.

The Devi Bhagavata Purana also mentions the Mahavidyas as war-companions and forms of the goddess Shakambhari. An oral tradition similarly replaces Shakambhari with the goddess Durga.

=== Chhinnamasta as an individual goddess ===
The Pranatoshini Tantra (18th century) narrates two tales of Chhinnamasta's birth. One legend, attributed to the Narada-pancharatra, tells how once, while bathing in Mandakini river, Parvati became sexually aroused and turned black. At the same time, her two female attendants Dakini and Varnini (also called Jaya and Vijaya) became extremely hungry and began to beg for food. Though Parvati initially promised to give them food once they returned home, the merciful goddess beheads herself with her nails and gives them her blood to satisfy their hunger. Later, they return home after Parvati rejoins her head.

The other version, from the Pranatoshini Tantra and attributed to Svatantra Tantra, is narrated by Shiva. He recounts that his consort Chandika (identified with Parvati) was engrossed in coitus, but became enraged at his seminal emission. Her attendants Dakini and Varnini rose from her body. The rest of the tale is similar to the earlier version, although the river is called Pushpabhadra, the day of Chhinnamasta's birth is called Viraratri, and upon seeing the pale Parvati, Shiva becomes infuriated and assumes the form of Krodha Bhairava. This version is retold in the Shaktisamgama Tantra (c. 16th century), in which Chhinnamasta forms a triad with Kali and Tara.

An oral legend tells how the goddess Prachanda Chandika appeared to aid the gods in the god-demon war, when the gods prayed to the Great Goddess Mahashakti. After slaying all demons, the enraged goddess cut off her own head and drank her own blood. The name Prachanda Chandika also appears as a synonym of Chhinnamasta in her hundred-name hymn in the Shakta Pramoda (19th century). Another oral legend relates her to the Samudra manthan (Churning of the Ocean) episode, where the gods and demons churned the milk ocean to acquire the amrita (the elixir of immortality). Chhinnamasta drank the demons' share of the elixir and then beheaded herself to prevent them from acquiring it.

The central themes of the mythology of Chhinnamasta are her self-sacrifice — with a maternal aspect (in the Pranatoshini Tantra versions) or for the welfare of the world (in the Samudra manthan oral version described above) — her sexual dominance (second Pranatoshini Tantra version), and her self-destructive fury (in the first oral legend).

== Iconography ==
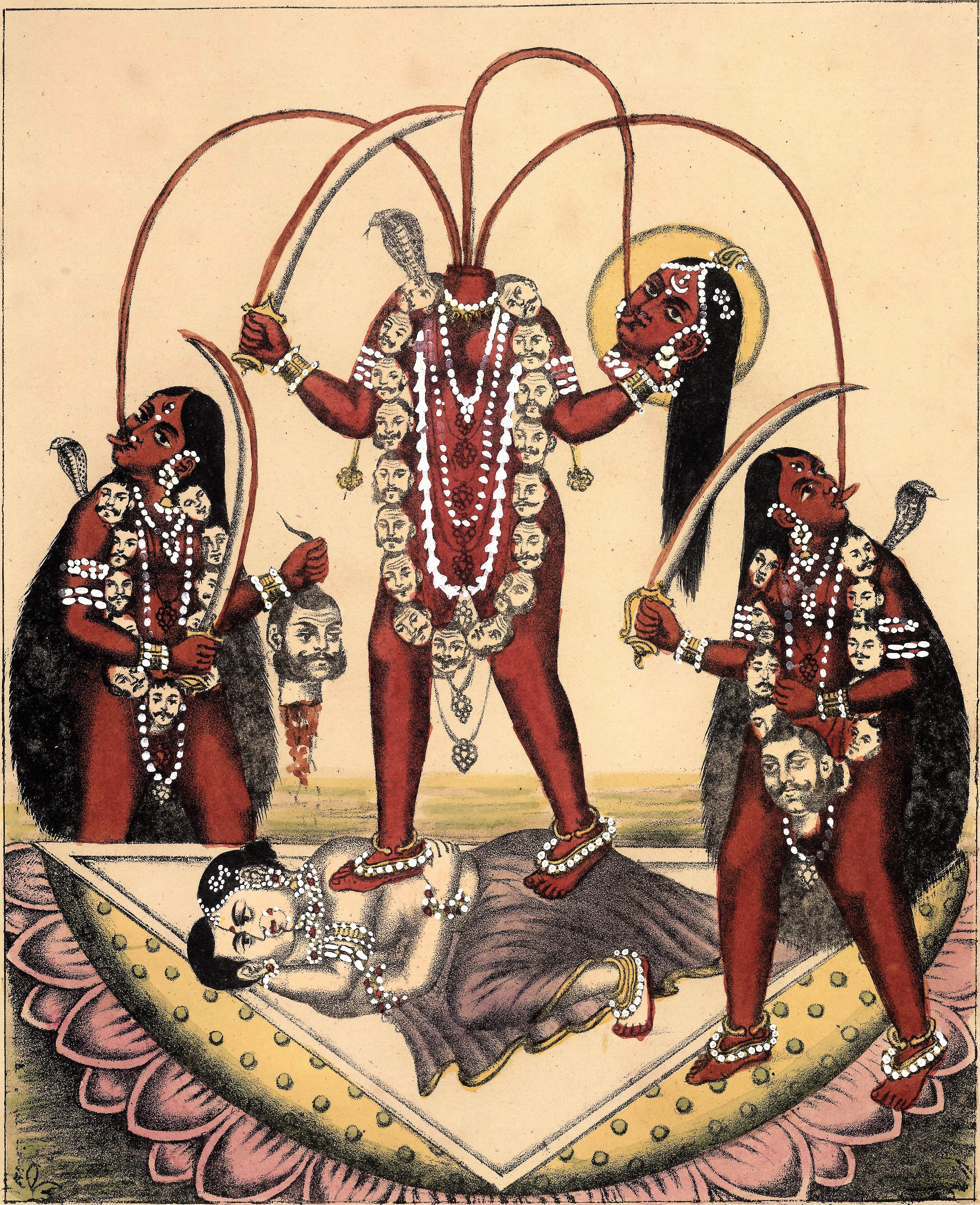
Goddess Chinnamasta is seen spewing blood from her severed head, while she stands upon a copulating couple, and her attendants drink her blood, 19th century lithograph

The iconography of Chhinnamasta is described in the Trishakti Tantra (pre-16th century), the Tantrasara (Prachandachandika section), the Shakta Pramoda (Chinnamastatantra section), and the Mantra-mahodadhih (1589 CE). Chhinnamasta's popular iconography is similar to the yellow-coloured severed-headed Buddhist Chinnamunda, except for the copulating couple — which is exclusive to the former's iconography — and her red skin.

=== Appearance ===
Chhinnamasta is described as a slim sixteen-year-old girl with full breasts, adorned with lotuses or having a single blue lotus near her heart.Her complexion is typically red, orange, or occasionally black. She is depicted mostly nude; however, she is so posed that her genitals are generally hidden or a multi-hooded cobra or jewellery around the waist covers them. Sometimes, she is partially or fully clothed.

The goddess carries her own severed head — sometimes on a platter or in a skull-bowl — in her left hand. Though no legend mentions a specific weapon for the beheading, she typically holds a scimitar, a knife, or a scissor-like object in her right hand. Though generally depicted with two arms, manifestations of the goddess with four arms also exist. While her own severed head and the sword appear in two of her hands, the implements in the remaining arms vary: a scissor-like object, a skull-bowl collecting the dripping blood from her head or blood stream from her neck, or a severed head, sometimes identified as that of the god Brahma.

Chhinnamasta may have a lolling tongue. Her hair is loose and dishevelled and sometimes decorated with flowers. Alternately, in some images, her hair is tied. Additionally, she is described as having a third eye and jewel on her forehead, which is tied to a snake or a crown on the severed head. The crescent moon may also adorn her head. Chhinnamasta is depicted wearing a serpent as the sacred thread and a mundamala (garland of skulls or severed heads and bones), along with other various gold or pearl ornaments around her neck. Bangles and waist-belt ornaments may be also depicted, and she may also wear a snake around her neck and serpentine earrings. Three streams of blood spring from her neck, one entering her own mouth, while the others are drunk by her female yogini companions, who flank her.

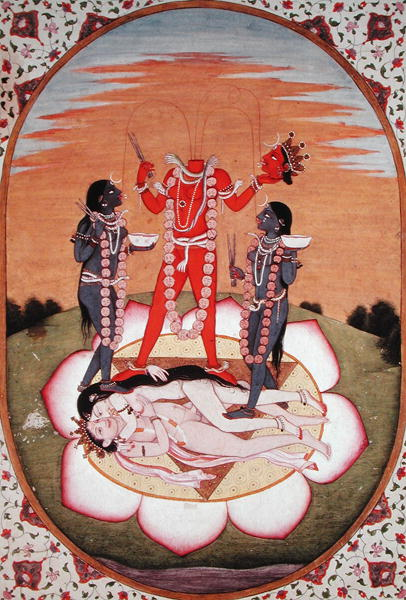
Kangra painting (c. 1800 CE) of Chhinnamasta.

=== Surroundings ===
With her right leg held straight and her left leg bent a little (the pratyalidha stance), Chhinnamasta stands in a fighting posture on the love-deity couple of Kamadeva (Kama) — a symbol of sexual love/lust — and his wife Rati, who are engaged in copulation with the latter usually on the top (viparita-rati sex position). Kamadeva is generally blue-complexioned, while Rati is white. Below the couple is a lotus with an inverted triangle, and in the background is a cremation ground. The Chhinnamasta Tantra describes the goddess sitting on the couple, rather than standing on them. The lotus beneath the couple is sometimes replaced by a cremation pyre. The coupling couple is sometimes omitted entirely. Sometimes Shiva — the goddess's consort — is depicted lying beneath Chhinnamasta, who is seated squatting on him and copulating with him. Dogs or jackals drinking the blood sometimes appear in the scene. Sometimes Chhinnamasta is depicted standing on a lotus, a grass patch, or the ground.

Another form of the goddess in the Tantrasara describes her seated in her own navel, formless and invisible. This form is said to be realised only via a trance. Another aniconic representation of the goddess is her yantra (a mystical geometrical diagram used in Tantric rituals), which figures the inverted triangle and lotus found in her iconography. Chhinnamasta's association with the navel and her red complexion can be connected to the fire element and the sun, while the lotus in her iconography signifies purity.

The scholar van Kooij notes that the iconography of Chhinnamasta has the elements of heroism (vira rasa) and terror (bhayanaka rasa) as well as eroticism (sringara rasa) in terms of the copulating couple, with the main motifs being the offering of her own severed head, the spilling and drinking of blood, and the trampling of the couple.

=== Attendants ===
Both of the attendants — Dakini to her left and Varnini to her right — are depicted nude, with matted or dishevelled hair, three-eyes, full-breasts. They wear the serpentine sacred thread and the mundamala, and carry a skull-bowl in the left hand and a knife in the right. Sometimes, the attendants also hold severed heads (not their own). While Dakini is fair, Varnini is red-complexioned. In other depictions, both are depicted blue-grey. Sometimes, her attendants are depicted as skeletons and drinking the dripping blood from Chhinnamasta's severed head, rather than her neck. The attendants are absent in some depictions.

== Symbolism and associations ==
=== Goddess of paradoxes ===
Though her head is cut off, she is the support of life. Though she is frightening in appearance, she is the giver of peace. Though a maiden, she increases our vigor, Mother Prachanda Chandika.

— Ganapati Muni, Prachanda Chandika 9–11, 14

Chhinnamasta is a goddess of All: she "is both the food and the eater of food, thereby symbolizing the whole world by this act of being devoured and the devourer. The dichotomy of receiver and giver or object and subject collapses into one." Most of her epithets listed in her nama-stotra (name-hymn, which enlists the names of a deity) convey marvel and fury; few names are erotic or peaceful, which are contrary to Chhinnamasta's fierce nature and appearance. Her sahasranama (thousand name-hymn) echoes paradoxes; she is Prachanda Chandika ("the powerfully fierce one") as well as Sarvananda-pradayini ("the prime giver of all ananda or bliss"). Her names convey the idea that though she is fierce at first appearance, she can be gentle upon worship.

While other fierce Hindu goddesses like Kali depict severing the heads of demons and are associated with ritual self-decapitation, Chhinnamasta's motif reverses the ritual head-offering, offering her own head to the devotees (attendants) in order to feed them. Thus, she symbolises the aspect of Devi as a giver, like Annapurna, the goddess of food, and Shakambhari, the goddess of vegetables, or a maternal aspect. The element of self-sacrifice is the symbol of "divine reciprocation" by the deity to her devotees. As a self-sacrificing mother, she symbolises the ideal woman; however, her sexuality and power are at odds with the archetype. She subdues and takes the life-force of the copulating divine couple, signifying the aspect of the life-taker, like Kali.

Chhinnamasta's serpentine ornaments indicate asceticism while her youthful nude ornamented body has erotic overtones. Like all Hindu goddesses, she is covered in gold finery: a symbol of wealth and fertility.

=== Destruction, transformation and recreation ===
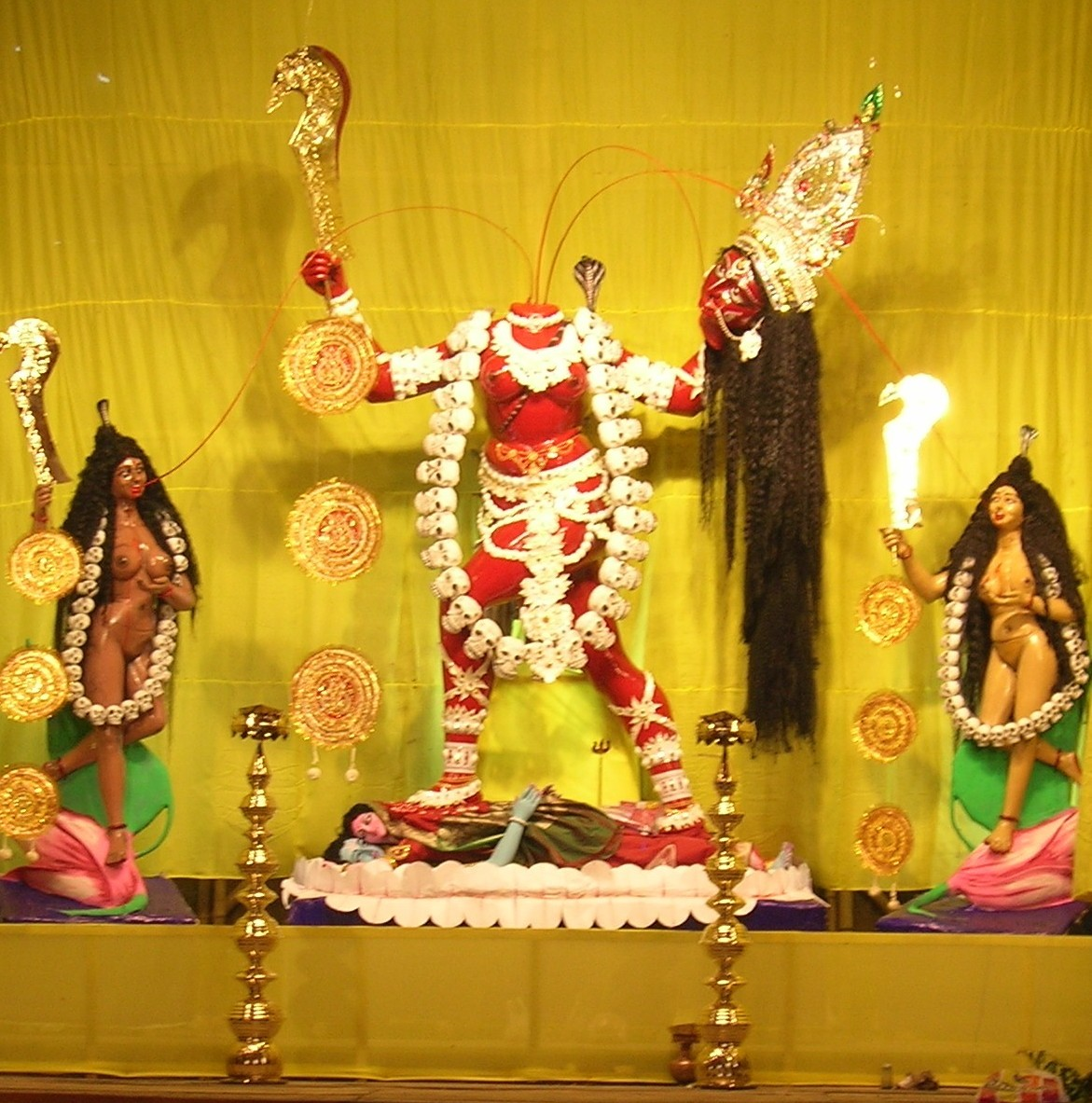
Chhinnamasta, at a Kali Puja Pandal, Kolkata

The scholars Pratapaditya Pal, an expert on South Asian art, and H. Bhattacharya, author of Hinduder Debdebi on the subject of Hindu deities, equate Chhinnamasta with the concepts of sacrifice and the renewal of creation. Chhinnamasta sacrifices herself, and her blood — drunk by her attendants — nourishes the universe. One invocation to her calls her the sacrifice, the sacrificer, and the recipient of the sacrifice, with the severed head treated as an offering. This paradox signifies the entire sacrificial process, and thus the cycle of creation, dissolution, and re-creation.

Chhinnamasta is "a figure of radical transformation, a great yogini". She conveys the universal message that all life is sustained by other forms of life, and that destruction and sacrifice are necessary for the continuity of creation. The goddess symbolises pralaya (cosmic dissolution), where she swallows all creation and makes way for new creation, thus conveying the idea of transformation. The Supreme Goddess is said to assume the form of Chhinnamasta for destruction of the universe. Chhinnamasta is considered a fearsome aspect of the Divine Mother. She is said to represent transformation and complements Kali, who represents time. Her hundred-name hymn and thousand-name hymn describe her fierce nature and wrath. The names describe her as served by ghosts and as gulping blood. She is pleased by human blood, human flesh, and meat, and worshipped by body hair, flesh, and fierce mantras.

The seer Ganapati Muni associated the Mahavidyas with prakasha ("Light") and nada ("Sound") with the stages of creation. Chhinnamasta is the violent interaction between the Light and the Sound enabling Creation. Chhinnamasta severing her own head is interpreted symbolic of the disconnecting of the Source and the manifest Creation, similar to cutting the umbilical cord between the mother and the newborn. Further, Chhinnamasta is associated with thunder and lightning, interacting light and sound forces. Her epithet, Vajra Vairochani ("radiant like the vajra"), is linked to the vajra (thunderbolt) and its divine master: Indra, the king of heaven and the god of rain, thunder and lightning.

The head offering and subsequent restoration of the head signify immortality. The dichotomy of temporality and immortality is alluded to by the blood stream drunk by Chhinnamasta's head — interpreted as amrita and the serpent, which sheds its skin without dying. The skull and severed head garlands signify her victory over time and fear of death. Chhinnamasta's black complexion denotes destruction; her depiction as red or orange denotes life. By drinking the blood, she appears as a saviour, who drinks the negativity of the world and transforms it to benevolent energies; in this interpretation, the blood is seen in negative light rather than amrita.

Chhinnamasta signifies that life, death, and sex are interdependent. Her image conveys the eternal truth that "life feeds on death, is nourished by death, necessitates death, and that the ultimate destiny of sex is to perpetuate more life, which in turn will decay and die in order to feed more life". While the lotus and the lovemaking couple symbolise life and the urge to create life, giving a life-force to the beheaded goddess, the blood flowing from the goddess conveys death and loss of the life-force, which flows into the mouths of her devotee yoginis, nourishing them.

=== Self-realization and awakening of kundalini ===
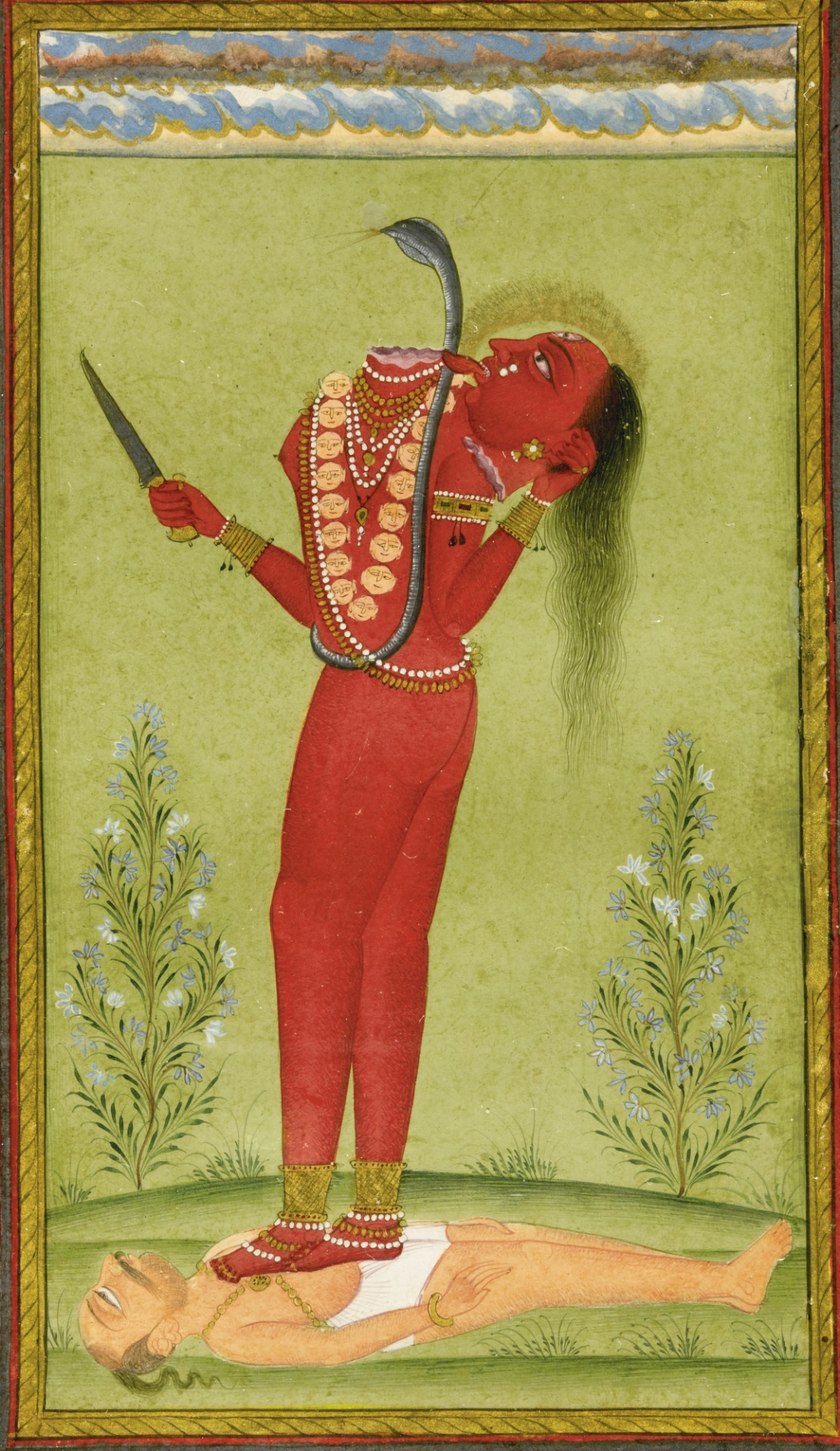
A Pahari painting depicting Chhinnamasta, c. 1750

The head is celebrated as a mark of identity as well as source of the seed. Thus, the self-decapitation represents removal of maya (illusion or delusion), physical attachment, false notions, ignorance, and egoism. The scimitar also signifies severance of these obstacles to moksha (emancipation), jnana (wisdom), and self-realization. The goddess also denotes discriminating perception. Chhinnamasta allows the devotee to gain a consciousness that transcends the bonds of physical attachment, the body, and the mind by her self-sacrifice. One interpretation suggests that her three eyes represent the sun, the moon, and fire while another links the third eye to transcendental knowledge. Unlike other Hindu deities who are depicted facing the devotee, Chhinnamasta generally looks at herself, prompting the devotee to look within themselves.

The Chhinnamasta icon is also understood as a representation of the awakening of the kundalini : spiritual energy. The copulating couple represent the awakening in the Muladhara chakra, which corresponds to the last bone in the spinal column. The kundalini flows through the central passage in the body — the Sushumna nadi (Note: In Yoga, nadis are invisible channels through his life-force is said to flow. There are three nadis: Sushumna, Ida and Pingala. Sushumna connects the Muladhara and Sahasrara and is cognate with the spinal cord. Ida courses from the right testicle to the left nostril and is linked to the cooling lunar energy and the right hand side of the brain. Pingala courses from the left testicle to the right nostril and is associated with the hot solar energy and the left hand side of the brain.) and hits the topmost chakra, the Sahasrara at the top of head — with such force that it blows her head off. The blood spilling from the throat represents the upward-flowing kundalini, breaking all knots (granthis) — things which make a person sad, ignorant and weak — of the chakras. The severed head is "transcendent consciousness". The three blood streams represent the flow of nectar when the kundalini unites with Shiva, who resides in the Sahasrara. The serpent in her iconography is also a symbol of the kundalini.

Another interpretation associates Daknini, Varnini, and Chhinnamasta with the three main nadis— Ida, Pingala, and Sushumna, respectively— flowing free. The goddess is generally said to be visualised in one's navel, the location of the Manipura chakra where the three nadis unite, and symbolises consciousness as well as the duality of creation and dissolution. Another tradition associates her with the Ajna chakra, the location of the "third eye" of wisdom between the eyebrows, the other meeting point of the three nadis.

The ability to remain alive despite the beheading is associated with supernatural powers and the awakening of the kundalini. The Earl of Ronaldshay (1925) compared Chhinnnamasta to India, beheaded by the British, "but nevertheless preserving her vitality unimpaired by drinking her own blood".

=== Control over or embodiment of sexual desire ===
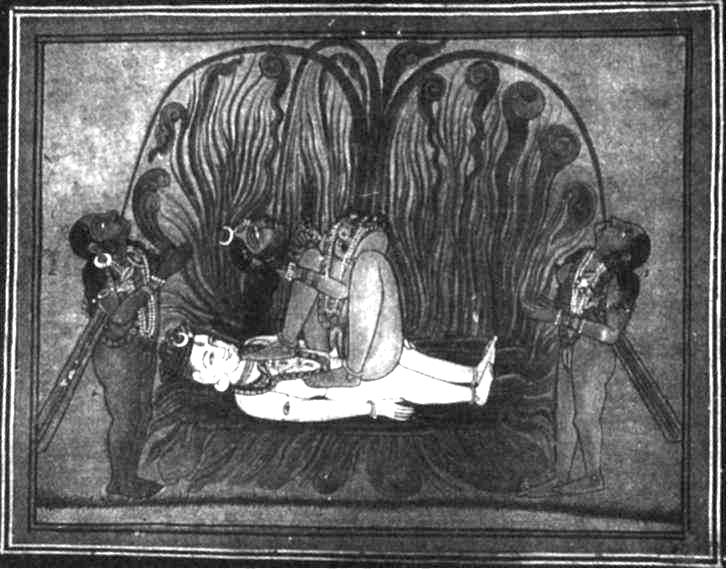
An 18th-century painting from Rajasthan of Chhinnamasta, seated squatting on Shiva, in coitus with him. Cremation pyres appear in the background.

There are two contrasting interpretations of Chhinnamasta in regard to sexual desire. The image of Chhinnamasta standing on a copulating couple of Kamadeva (literally, "sexual desire") and Rati ("sexual intercourse") is interpreted by some scholars as a symbol of a person's control over sexual desire, while others interpret the goddess as being the embodiment of sexual energy.

Her names, such as Yogini and Madanatura ("one who has control of Kama"), convey her yogic control over sexual energy. Her triumphant stance trampling the love-deity couple denotes victory over desire and samsara (the cycle of birth, death, and rebirth). Her subjugation of the amorous couple suggests that her worship will grant control over sexual urges and other impulses of the indriyas ("senses"), whose governing god Indra she is associated with.

Images in which Chhinnamasta is depicted sitting on Kamadeva-Rati in a non-suppressive fashion suggest that the couple is giving sexual energy to the goddess. Images where Shiva is depicted in coitus with Chhinnamasta are associated with this interpretation. Chhinnamasta's names like Kameshwari ("goddess of desire") and Ratiragavivriddhini ("one who is engrossed in the realm of Rati [copulation]") and the appearance of klim— the common seed syllable of Kamadeva and Krishna — in her mantra support this interpretation. Her lolling tongue also denotes sexual hunger.

The inverted triangle, found in Chhinnamasta's iconography as well as in her yantra, signifies the yoni (womb) and the feminine. The goddess is often prescribed to be visualised in the centre of the inverted triangle in the navel. It also signifies the three gunas (qualities) and three shaktis (powers): iccha ("will-power"), kriya ("action"), and jnana ("wisdom"). The goddess is also called Yoni-mudra or Yoni-gamya: accessible through the yoni.

=== Other symbolism and associations ===
Chhinnamasta's nudity and headlessness symbolise her integrity and "heedlessness". Her names like Ranjaitri ("victorious in war") celebrate her as the slayer of various demons and her prowess in battle. Her nakedness and free-flowing hair denote rejection of societal stereotypes and her rebellious freedom, as well as her sensual aspect.

While the goddess is a mature sixteen-year-old who has conquered her ego and awakened her kundalini, the yogini attendants are described as spiritually immature twelve-year-olds who are sustained on the goddess's blood and have not become liberated from the delusion of duality. In portrayals where the goddess's hair is tied like a matron and her attendants have free-flowing hair like young girls, the goddess is treated as a motherly figure of regal authority and power; the tied hair and headlessness represent contrasting ideas of controlled and uncontrolled nature, respectively. The triad of the goddess and the two yoginis is also philosophically cognate to the triad of patterns, "which creative energy is felt to adopt". Besides the nadis, Chhinnamasta, Varnini and Dakini also represent the guna trinity: sattva (purity), rajas (energy), and tamas (ignorance).

== Worship ==
Chhinnamasta's individual cult is not widespread, but she is well-known and depicted as part of the Mahavidya group in goddess temples. Temples dedicated solely to Chhinnamasta are rare, and her private worship by lay worshippers is probably uncommon. Kinsley attributes the lack of lay worship of Chhinnamasta to her ferocious nature and her reputation for being dangerous to approach and worship. Her individual worship is mainly restricted to heroic Tantrikas, and those who worship her say only yogis and world renouncers have the ability to meditate on her using her icon.

Within the esoteric Tantric tradition, Chhinnamasta is a significant deity. She enjoys "active worship" in eastern India and Nepal; her temples are primarily found in Nepal as well as in the Indian states of Odisha, West Bengal, Jharkhand and the eastern part of Uttar Pradesh. Benard remarks that she could not visit any Chhinnamasta temples in Bengal, however was "assured" that Chhinnamasta is a popular goddess there. The goddess is also venerated in the Kalikula ("family of Kali") sect of Shaktism, the goddess-centric sect of Hinduism.

=== Goals of worship ===
Tantric practitioners worship Chhinnamasta for acquiring siddhis, including the ability to cast spells and for helping the needed. She is prescribed to be worshipped for subjugation or enchantment of men and women (vasikarana), annihilation of foes (uchchatana), someone's death (marana) and causing hatred or hostilities between friends (vidveshana). Chhinnamasta's mantra (sacred chant)— Srim hrim klim aim Vajravairocaniye hum hum phat svaha— can be invoked to attract and subjugate women. Her mantra associates her with syllables denoting beauty, light, fire, spiritual self-realization, and destruction of delusion. The Shakta Pramoda and the Rudrayamala recommend the use of her mantra to obtain wealth and auspiciousness.

Acarya Ananda Jha, the author of the Chinnamasta Tattva, prescribes her worship by soldiers as she embodies self-control of lust, heroic self-sacrifice for the benefit of others, and fearlessness in the face of death. In a collective prayer to the Mahavidyas in the Shakta Maha-bhagavata Purana, the devotee prays to emulate Chhinnamasta in her generosity to others. Other goals common to worship of all Mahavidyas are: poetic speech, well-being, control of one's foes, removal of obstacles, ability to sway kings, ability to attract others, conquest over other kings, and, finally, moksha (salvation).

=== Modes of worship ===
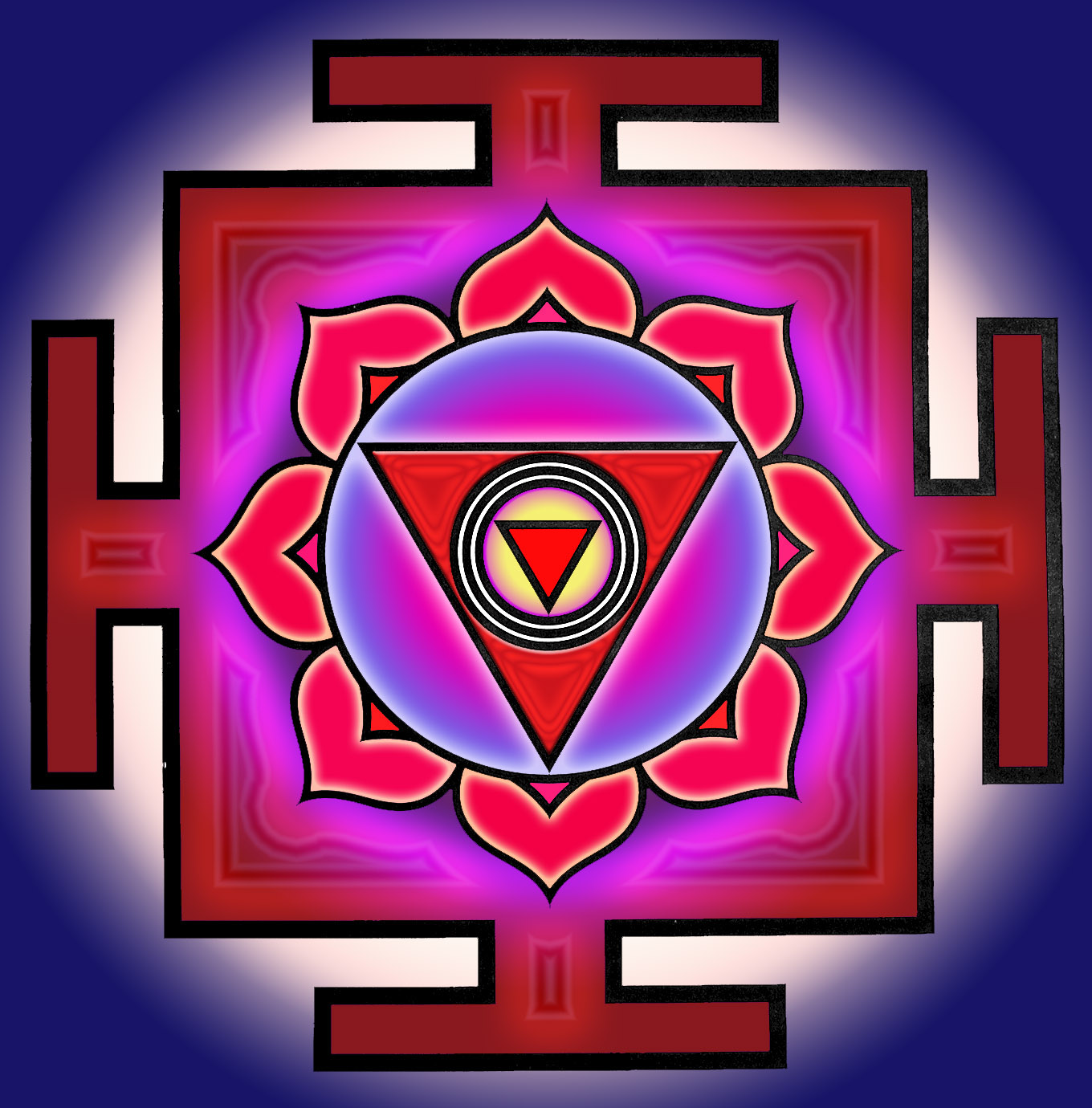
The yantra of Chhinnamasta. The yantra serves as aniconic representation of the goddess.

The Tantric texts Tantrasara, Shakta Pramoda and Mantra-mahodadhih give details about the worship of Chhinnamasta and other Mahavidyas, including her yantra, mantra and her dhyanas (meditative or iconographic forms). The Sri Chhinnamasta Nityarcana by Shri Swamiji (1979) details the rituals for the daily worship of Chhinnamasta.

In her puja, Chhinnamasta's image or her yantra is worshipped, along with her attendants. The heterodox offerings of Panchamakara – wine, meat, fish, parched grain, and coitus – along with mainstream offerings such as flowers, light, incense, etc., are prescribed for her worship. A fire sacrifice and repetition of her stotra (hymn of praise) or her nama-stotra (name-hymn) are also prescribed in her worship. The Shakta Pramoda has her sahasranama (thousand name-hymn) as well as a compilation of her 108 names in a hymn.

Tantric texts tell the worshipper to imagine a red sun orb — signifying a yoni triangle — in their own navel. The popular form of Chhinnamasta is imagined to reside in the orb. The Tantrasara cautions a householder-man to invoke the goddess only in "abstract terms". It further advises that, if woman invokes Chhinnamasta by her mantra, the woman will become a dakini and lose her husband and son, thereby becoming a perfect yogini. The Shaktisamgama Tantra prescribes her worship only by the left-handed path (Vamamarga). The Mantra-mahodadhih declares that such worship involves having sexual intercourse with a woman who is not one's wife. The Shakta Pramoda tells the same, adding fire sacrifices, wine, and meat offerings at night. The best time to propitiate her is said to be the fourth quarter of the evening, that is, midnight.

Some hymns narrate that Chhinnamasta likes blood and thus is offered blood sacrifices at some shrines. The Shaktisamgama Tantra says that only brave souls (viras) should follow Vamamarga worship to the goddess. The Shakta Pramoda warns that improper worship brings severe consequences, with Chhinnamasta beheading the person and drinking his blood. Further, it explains the worship rituals to be followed by householders and those to be followed by renouncers. The Todala Tantra mentions that, as part of Chhinnamasta's worship, Shiva or his fierce form, Bhairava, be worshipped as Kabandha ("headless trunk") as the goddess's consort. The worship of Kabandha, to the right of Chhinnamasta, is said to grant siddhis.

Chhinnamasta is typically worshipped at midnight along with the other Mahavidyas at Kali Puja, the festival of Kali. However, householders are cautioned not to worship her. The Bakhrabad area of Cuttack district and the 86 Palli pandal of Kolkata have unique traditions of worshipping Chhinnamasta, instead of Kali, on Kali Puja.

=== Temples ===
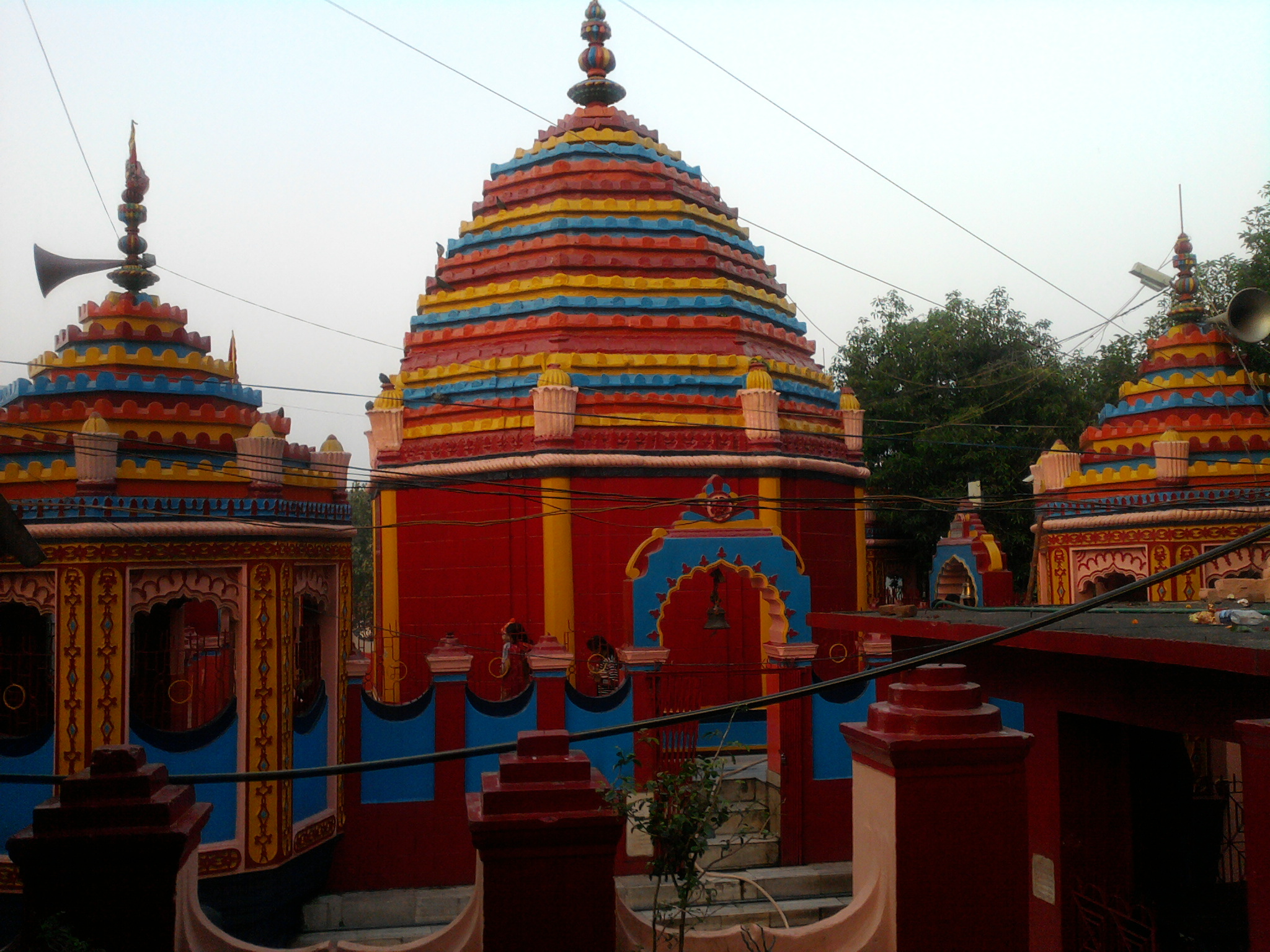
Chhinnamasta Temple in Rajrappa

The Chintpurni ("She who fulfills one's wishes"), temple of Chhinnamastika in Himachal Pradesh, is one of the Shakta pithas (considered the holiest goddess temples) and is where the goddess Sati's forehead (mastaka) fell. Here, Chhinnamasta is interpreted as the severed-headed one as well as the foreheaded-one. The central icon is a pindi, an abstract form of Devi. While householders worship the goddess as a form of the goddess Durga, ascetic sadhus view her as the Tantric severed-headed goddess.

Another important shrine is the Chhinnamasta Temple near Rajrappa in Jharkhand, where a natural rock covered with an ashtadhatu (eight-metal alloy) kavacha (cover) is worshipped as the goddess. Though well-established as a centre of Chhinnamasta by the 18th century, the site is a popular place of worship among tribals since ancient times. Kheer and animal sacrifice are offered to the goddess.

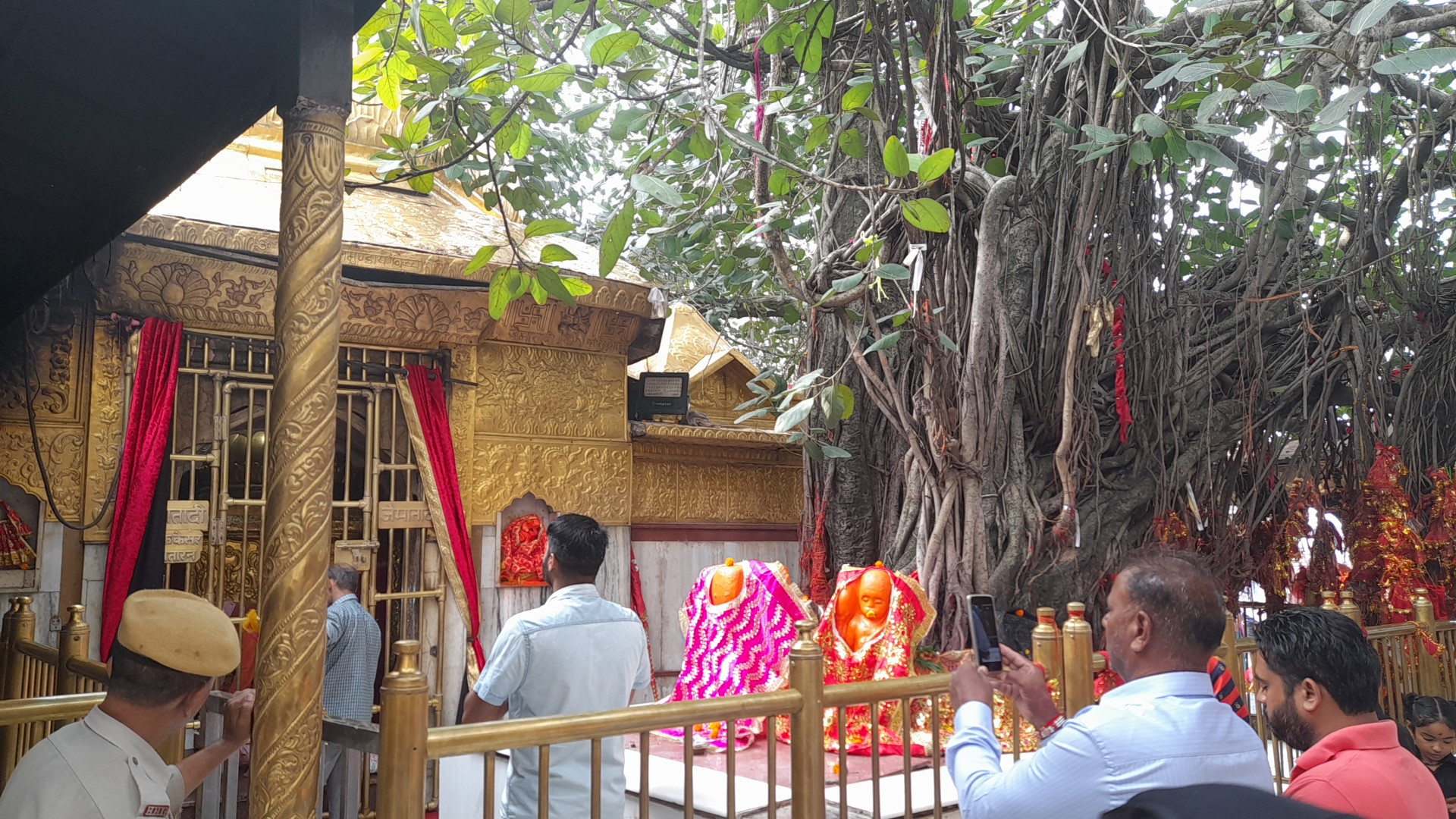
Temple dedicated to Chhinnamasta in Chintpurni

A shrine dedicated to Chhinnamasta was built by a Tantric sadhu in the Durga Temple complex, Ramnagar, near Varanasi, Uttar Pradesh, where tantrikas worship her using corpses. Kanpur, Uttar Pradesh, has a shrine of the goddess that is open only three days a year, around Chaitra Navaratri. Her shrines are also situated in the Kamakhya Temple complex, Assam and Basukinath temple complex, Jharkhand along with other Mahavidyas. There is a Chhinnamasta temple at Bishnupur, West Bengal. The goddess Manikeswari, a popular goddess in Odisha, is often identified with Chhinnamasta.

Chhinnamasta's shrines are also found in Nepal's Kathmandu Valley. A shrine in the Changu Narayan Temple holds a 13th-century icon of Chhinnamasta. A chariot festival in the Nepali month of Baishakh is held in honour of the goddess. In the fields near the temple sits a small shrine to Chhinnamasta. A temple of the goddess in Patan built in 1732 contains her images in different postures and enjoys active worship.

== See also ==
- Dullahan
- Headless Rider urban legend
- Cephalophore – a saint who is generally depicted carrying their severed head
- Chhinnamasta – a Hindu goddess holding her own severed head
- Beheading game – Motif of medieval romance
- Decapitation – Complete separation of the head from the body
- Headhunting – Practice of hunting a human and collecting the severed head after killing the victim
- Headless priest
- Shrunken head
- With Her Head Tucked Underneath Her Arm
