= Chhinnamasta Temple, Rajrappa =

Hindu temple in Jharkhand, India

Chhinnamastika Temple
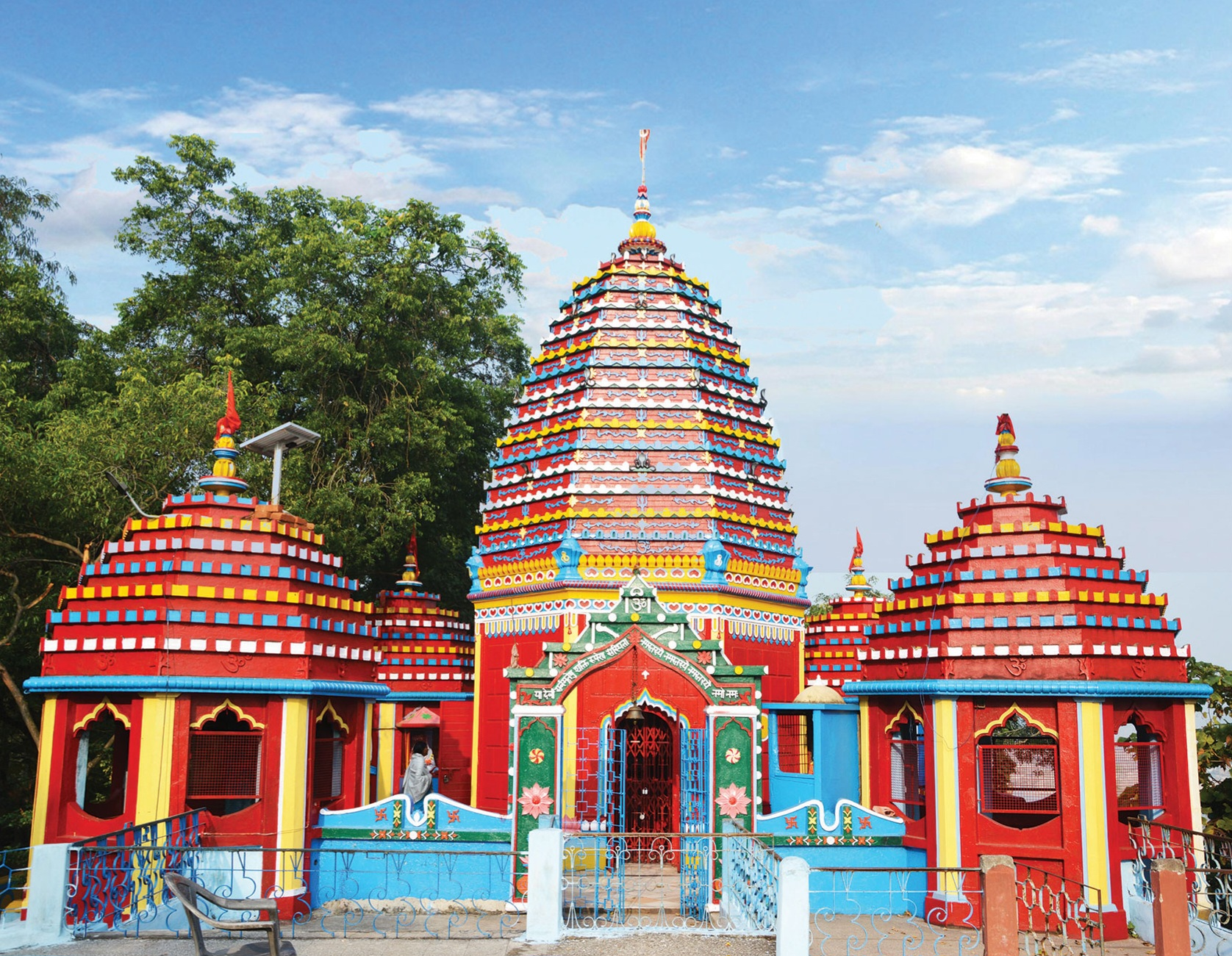

- Location in Jharkhand

Religion
- Affiliation: Hinduism
- District: Ramgarh district
- Deity: Chhinnamasta
- Festivals: Makar Sankranti, Maha Shivaratri, Vijayadashami

Location
- Location: Rajrappa
- State: Jharkhand
- Country: India
- Interactive map of Chhinnamastika Temple
- Coordinates: 23°37′56″N 85°41′38″E

Chhinnamastika Temple is a Hindu temple, dedicated to Goddess Chinnamasta is a Hindu pilgrimage centre located in Rajrappa, in Ramgarh district of Jharkhand, India. The place attracts devotees from all parts of Jharkhand, and also from the neighbouring states of West Bengal and Bihar. The Chhinnamasta temple is popular for its Tantric style of architectural design. Apart from the main temple, there are ten temples of various deities such as the Surya, Hanuman and Shiva.

== History of Rajarappa ==
It was this place where the Raja of Ramgarh Raj gave 3 acres of land to the people in the Bhudhan Movement in Jharkhand.

== Etymology ==
Chhinnamasta (Sanskrit: छिन्नमस्ता, Chinnamastā, "She whose head is severed"), often spelled Chinnamasta and also called Chhinnamastika and Prachanda Chandika, is one of the Mahavidyas, ten Tantric goddesses and a ferocious aspect of Devi, the Hindu Divine Mother. Chhinnamasta can be easily identified by her fearsome iconography. The self-decapitated goddess holds her own severed head in one hand, a scimitar in another. Three jets of blood spurt out of her bleeding neck and are drunk by her severed head and two attendants. Chhinnamasta is usually depicted standing on a copulating couple.

== Geography ==
Chhinnamasta temple is located at Rajrappa, 28 km away from Ramgarh Cantonment along NH 20 in the Ramgarh district of the State of Jharkhand, India. It is situated on a hillock at the confluence of the Damodar and Bhera (Bhairavi River) rivers near the Rajrappa falls.

This location has a special significance. It is at the union of Bhairavi nadi (female) coming from top, meeting Damodar nada (male) signifying the vipareeta rati ("opposite copulation") pose as described in Devi Chhinnamasta's dhyana (vipareeta rataturam). Here Bhairavi is active shakti and Damodar is the male passive member of rati action. Damodar is very calm and Bhairavi is the active member.

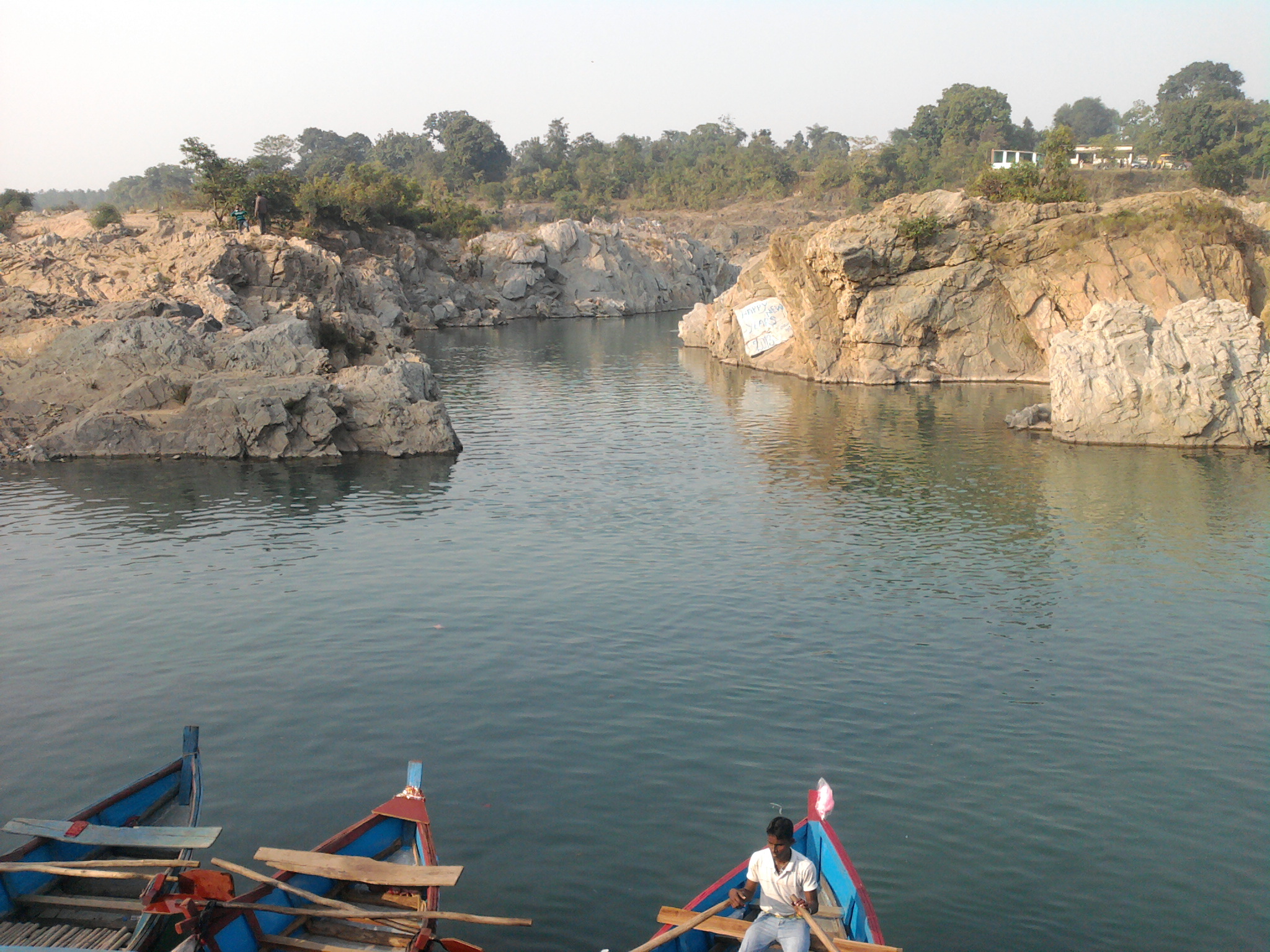
Sangam Sthal at the confluence of the Damodar and Bhairavi rivers

== Description ==
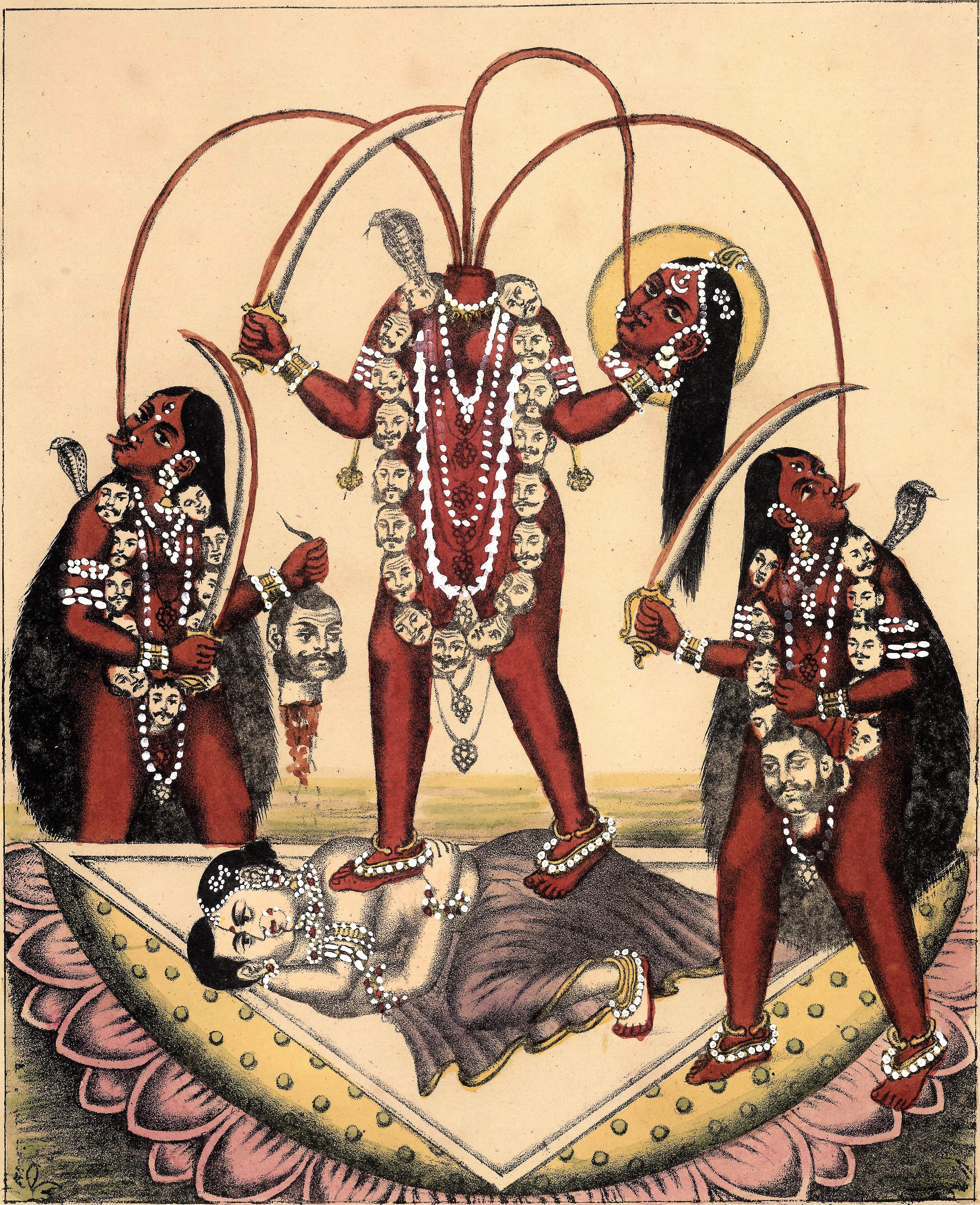
Goddess Chhinnamasta

A natural rock covered with an ashtadhatu (eight-metal alloy) kavacha (cover) is worshipped as the goddess Chhinnamasta. Though well-established as a centre of Chhinnamasta by the 18th century, the site is a popular place of worship among tribals since ancient times. Kheer and animal sacrifice are offered to the goddess.

Many smaller temples have been built around the main temple such as the temples of Ashtamatrika and Dakshina Kali. The temples of Mahavidyas built in a series nearby are Tara, Shodashi, Bhuvaneswari, Bhairavi, Bagla, Kamla, Matangi, Dhumavati.

The temple is very old and is flocked by devotees from Bihar, Jharkhand, West Bengal, Assam and Nepal for worship of Goddess Chinnamastika. Vedic book Durga Saptashati also mentions the temple. The art and architectural design resembles the design of temples of Tantrik importance. The temple is considered as notable as the tantrik site of Kamakhya Temple of Assam which has a similar architecture. The temple is one of the 10 Mahavidhyas.The ancient temple of Goddess was destroyed and later a new temple was constructed and the original idol of Goddess was placed in it. Animal sacrifice is still practised in the temple. The sacrificial animals are killed on Tuesdays, Saturdays and during Kali puja.

A large number of pilgrims arrive here throughout the year. Large congregation of people takes place here during the full Moon and New Moon nights. Owing to the religious importance of the place, it is also popular among the disciples for marriage and ritual of Mundan or shaving the head. Vehicle owners come here to get blessings for their new vehicles as they believe that the first worship of vehicles here multiplies the life of vehicles and brings luck to the owners. Tantriks look upon this place for Tantric accomplishment.

Rajrappa also is a pilgrim centre for the Santals and other tribals who come for immersion of the ashes of their loved ones in the Damodar. They come mostly during the month of December, in groups known as yatri. As per their mythology it is their final resting place. In their folk songs Rajrappa is referred to as "Thel Kopi Ghat" (Water Ghat) and they use oil after bathing. They come in significant numbers from the southern parts of Jharkhand state such as East and West Singhbhum and Saraikela districts. Maa Chinmastika devi is also known as Manokamna devi due to the belief that it fulfils the wishes of the devotees. Devotees tie a red thread around a rock in the temple for the fulfillment of their wishes.

In the month of January a special fair is held here on the festival of Makar Sankranti and attended by lakhs of people. A fair is also organized during the festival of Vijaydashmi, Vijayadashami and attended by large number of people. Visitors can take a holy bath in the river.

Besides religious importance, the place is also a picnic spot owing to its natural environment. The hilly landscape covered with lush forest and rivers are some of its features. The hot water spring located here increases the popularity of the region. The Bhera River joins the Damodar River from a height of 20 feet creating a waterfall. The location has boating facilities and visitors can take boat rides in the locality having various rock formations along the river bank. The place also attracts many foreign tourists due to its natural and religious importance.

== See also ==
- Ramgarh district
