= Chinnamunda =

Buddhist goddess

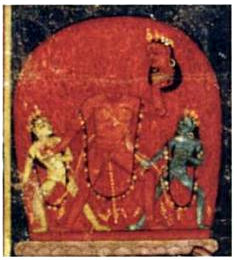
Chinnamunda in center holding with Mekhala and Kanakhala on either side.

Chinnamuṇḍā is a Buddhist goddess. She is held as an aspect of Vajrayogini or Vajravārāhī.

== Iconography ==
Her attributes and iconography are similar to those of the Hindu goddess Chinnamasta, although according to David Kinsley, Chinnamunda probably predates her Hindu counterpart. The main difference among them is that Chinnamasta is often portrayed as standing on a copulating couple, while Chinnamunda is not.

Chinnamunda is often portrayed alongside Mekhala and Kanakhala, the two headless sisters, Indian Buddhist tantric adepts who appear on the list of the 84 Mahasiddhas.

== Story ==
According to a Buddhist story, Chinnamunda was a princess named Lakshminkara who once displeased her father. He sentenced punishment on her, but she replied that she would punish herself, and severed her own head with a golden razor. She then proceeded to parade around the city holding her head. As a consequence, the citizens called her Chinnamunda. She was eventually reborn as a devotee of Padmasambhava.
