= Mekhala and Kanakhala =

Two mahasiddha sisters in Tantric Buddhism

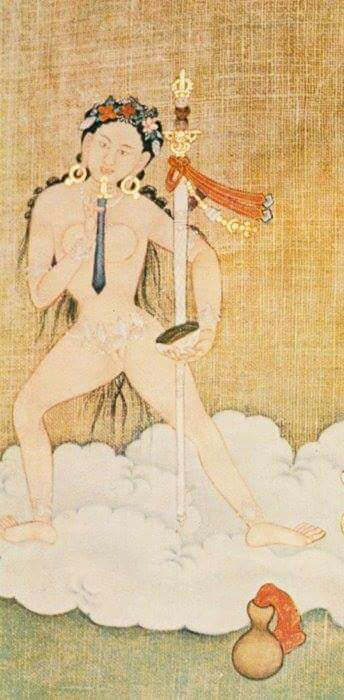
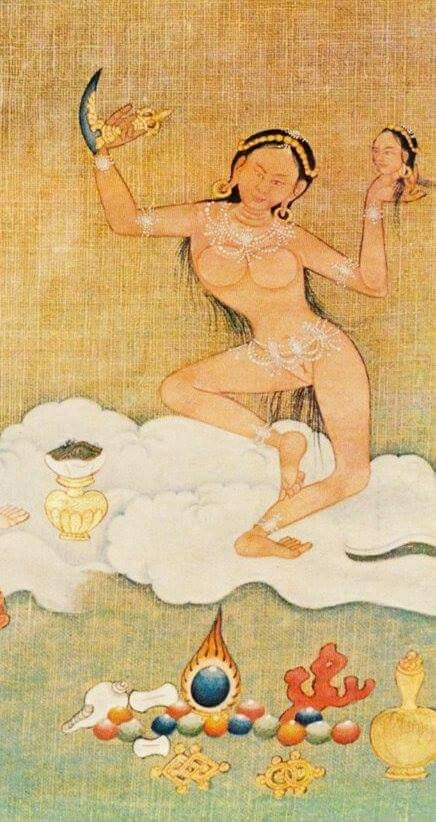
Sisters Mekhala and Kanakhala dancing in the nude

Mekhala (Mekhalā or Mahakhala – "Elder Mischievous Girl", "The Elder Severed-Headed Sister") and Kanakhala (Kankhala, Kanakhalā – "Younger Mischievous Girl", "The Younger Severed-Headed Sister") are two sisters who figure in the eighty-four mahasiddhas ("great adept") of Vajrayana Buddhism. Both are described as the disciples of another mahasiddha, Kanhapa (Krishnacharya). They are said to have severed their heads, offered them to their guru, and danced headless. Their legend is closely associated with the Buddhist severed-headed goddess Chinnamunda.

== Legend ==
The Legends of the Eighty-four Mahasiddhas (Wylie: grub thob brgyad bcu tsa bzh'i lo rgyus, written by the Tibetan monk Mondup Sherab, which was narrated to him by Abhayadattashri c. 12th century) narrates the following tale: Mekhala and Kanakhala were daughters of a householder in Devīkoṭṭa (now in Bengal), who married them to sons of a boatman. Their husbands taunted them and their neighbours gossiped about them. Finally, Kanakhala could not take the abuse any more and suggested to Mekhala that they should flee their house. However, the wise Mekhala told her younger sister that they deserved it and would have to face the same torment somewhere else if they run away, so they stayed and bore the agony.

The mahasiddha guru Kanhapa passed by their house with his retinue of seven-hundred dakas and dakinis. The sisters prostrated to the guru and explained their anguish. Kanhapa instructed them in the sādhanā (spiritual practice) of the goddess Vajravārāhī, a ferocious form of Vajrayogini. The sisters practised the meditative techniques for 12 years and accomplished their goal.

The sisters journeyed to meet their guru to seek further instruction. They bowed to him and circumambulated him in reverence, however the daka failed to recognize them. They introduced themselves as the married unhappy sisters he had initiated twelve years ago. He responded that if he was their guru, they should have brought him offerings. The sisters asked him his desired offerings. The guru promptly asked for their heads.

The sisters unquestioningly decapitated themselves and offered their severed heads at his feet. Their bodies danced as their severed heads sang reverently. The guru rejoined their heads and torsos. They were known as the "Headless Yoginis" henceforth. By this act, they acquired mahamudra-siddhi (supernatural magical powers) and became mahasiddhas.

After serving the beings of the world for several years, they bodily assumed Khechara, the Paradise of dakinis governed by Vajrayogini.

=== Association with Chinnamunda ===
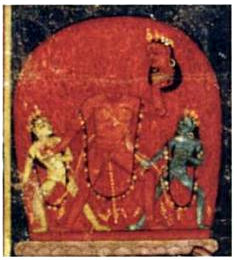
The goddess Chinnamunda is associated with the legend of Mekhala and Kanakhala.

The legend of the sisters is associated with Chinnamunda or Sarvabuddhadakini, the severed headed form of the goddess Vajrayogini or her form Vajravarahi. The nude self-decapitated goddess, standing in a fighting posture, holds her own severed head in one hand, a knife in another. Three jets of blood spurt out of her bleeding neck and are drunk by her severed head and two dakini attendants, Vajravairocani and Vajravarnini. The attendants hold a skull and a knife. This form is almost identical to the Hindu goddess Chinnamasta, who is standing on a copulating couple.

Taranatha (1575–1634) in his Historical Works - Kahna pa 'i mam char (a biography of Kanhapa) describes the life of some of his disciples including Mekhala and Kanakhala. The sisters lived in south of Maharashtra. When Mekhala and Kanakhala were 10 and 8 years old respectively, they were betrothed to young Brahmin boys, however were not married to them after they reached puberty and finally their marriages broke. Their neighbours gossiped about the same.

The sisters surrendered to Kanhapa, who had arrived in the region then. Kanhapa considered them fit disciples and trained them. They remained with his entourage for a few days. Kanhapa taught them the sadhana of Vajravarahi and sent them to a forest to practise in solitude. They attained many siddhis.

Once, they encountered yogi disciples of Gorakhnath, who mocked them as disciples of Kanhapa and asked them to show a magic trick. The sisters with their powers moved the house of Gorakhnath's disciples to an arid desert from the picturesque setting it was at previously. Repentant, the yogis begged for forgiveness; the sisters relented and restored their dwelling to its former location.

After 12 years, the sisters sought to meet their guru. They found Kanhapa in Bengal, however the guru failed to recollect his meeting with them. Upon his request, the sisters drew swords of wisdom from their mouths and severed their heads and offered them to Kanhapa. The headless sisters danced rising upward in the sky and disappeared in a rainbow light.

The self-decapitation of Mekhala and Kanakhala started a dangerous trend of self-decapitation by dakinis. Ultimately, the goddess Vajravārāhī herself appeared in this form as Chinnamunda and danced with the dakinis to stop further head-chopping.

== Iconography ==
Mekhala and Kanakhala are depicted as nude or topless girls in puberty, clad only in gold ornaments and tiara-like headgear, with swords held above their heads or dancing with them. They may also be depicted in the act of decapitation.

In combined portrayals, Mekhala is on the left, holding a skull-cup in her left hand and drawing a sword from her mouth with her right hand or simply holding a sword or a kartika knife. A skull-staff is supported in the crook of her left arm. Kanakhala holds her own severed head in her left hand and a sword or a kartika in her right. Kanakhala's head may be intact over her neck or she may be beheaded. In combined portrayals of the dancing sisters, Kanhapa may be depicted with one of sisters' heads by his side; the sisters may not be beheaded in the portrayal. In a painting, where Kanakala is depicted headless, three streams of blood gush from her neck. One stream of blood is drunk by Kanakhala's head in her hand; the others are collected in the skull-cups of Mekhala and Kanhapa.

== Dating ==
Mekhala and Kanakhala are dated to the late ninth century based on the dating of their guru Krishnacharya, identified with Kanhapa.
