= Self-sacrifice =

Psychological term

Self-sacrifice is the giving up of something that a person wants for themselves, so that others can be helped or protected, or so that other external values can be advanced or protected. Generally, an act of self-sacrifice conforms to the rule that it does not serve the person's best self-interest, and will leave the person in a worse situation than the person otherwise would have been.

Two other common types of sacrifice can easily be confused with self-sacrifice, but do not conform to this rule. The first involves giving up on interests accidentally or unintentionally. This behaviour is frequently engaged in during everyday life even in attempting to serve self-interests, without people being aware of it. A second type of sacrifice involves willfully forgoing a minor benefit in favour of a greater benefit, even while such an action feels like a sacrifice. However, if the action results in deferred gratification, it does not involve a true cost.

Although there have been many heroic events of self-sacrifice worth eulogizing, in recent decades suicide terrorism, a violent form of self-sacrifice, has been more prevalent and drawn widespread attention. An estimated 3,500 such assaults were reported in the three decades prior to 2014.

== Measurement ==
Bélanger et al. created the Self-Sacrifice Scale in 2014, which is a 10-item, Likert-scaled assessment and consists of a single factor plus two method factors to statistically evaluate people's tendency for self-sacrifice developed through the integration of 8 research. The Self-Sacrifice Scale has great levels of dependability, according to the results (alpha =.90). It shows strong convergent validity that it is connected to favorable appraisal and dedication to a specific cause, discriminant validity that it is not connected to psychological dysfunctions like depression and suicidal thoughts, test-retest reliability, and the capacity to foresee important future events that is the devotion to a goal and sadness if the cause fails. It also implies that the ability to sacrifice oneself is better understood as a goal-oriented behavior than as a disorder. Finally, this measure demonstrated acceptable predictive validity for emotional, cognitive, and behavioral variables.

== Motivation ==
=== Identity fusion ===
Identity fusion refers to a feeling of unity among a group. People who have a stronger sense of belonging to a group are also more prepared to make sacrifices for the good of fellow ingroup members. According to studies, assessments of fusion are indicators of excessive pro-group behavior. Extreme actions do not develop as a result of a persistently frail or shaky sense of self. On the contrary, people's individual and social identities are functionally identical and both prominent when they merge with a group. Igniting the individual or social identities of fusion people and integrating their agency into collective activity to make those two types of identity work together can encourage high degrees of extreme acts involving self-sacrifice for the group. On the other hand, merging identities encourages feelings of kinship with the ingroup. To put it another way, fellow members of the group start to feel like family and are consequently deemed to be worth dying for.

=== Sacred causes ===
Several sorts of organizations, ideologies, and principles stand out to people as deserving of sacrifice. According to cross-cultural research, the greatest expressions of primary group identification are constrained by sacred principles, frequently manifested as religious convictions or transcendental philosophies, which causes certain groups to succeed because at least some members hence take nonrational commitment and engage in combat for a large cause even sacrifice themselves. When a group of comrades develop sacred ideals, they may first be inspired by one or more of them before coming together to form an idealized family-like group that is defined and motivated by these values, which can be associated with identity fusion. This is proved by the facts during World War II that due to loyalty to ingroup members and cause rather than normal reward mechanisms, such as money and promotion, revolutionary and insurgent forces (such as the ISIS) have defeated armies even with greater weapons and personnel.

=== Quest for significance ===
People are motivated to self-sacrifice to feel self-worth, especially after suffering a loss of significance, according to the quest for personal significance theory. People report being more willing to sacrifice themselves when their sense of significance is low, which inspires self-sacrifice more than normal destructive feelings. Various events that lead to a devaluation of oneself might spark the desire to restore significance via self-sacrifice. Acting in a pro-social manner that requires self-sacrifice may be a useful strategy as self-sacrifice boosts perceptions of significance along with self-worth and approval more compared to joyful experiences.

== See also ==
- Altruism (unselfishness)
- Altruistic suicide
- Hero
- Sacrifice
- Self-denial
- Self-sacrifice in Jewish law
- Suicide mission
