= Kotavi =

Mother of Banasura in Hindu mythology

Kotavi (Sanskrit: कोटवी, romanized: Koṭavī) is an asuri in Hindu mythology and the tutelary goddess of the race of daityas. She is also identified with the goddess Durga. In the Puranas, she is depicted as the mother of Banasura. In a desperate attempt to save her son's life in his battle against Krishna, she appears unclad in front of the latter, though the deity still slices his arms.

== Sources ==
- A Classical Dictionary of Hindu Mythology & Religion by John Dowson
