= Durga Mandir, Ramnagar =

Hindu Temple in Uttar Pradesh, India

Durga Mandir
- दुर्गा मंदिर
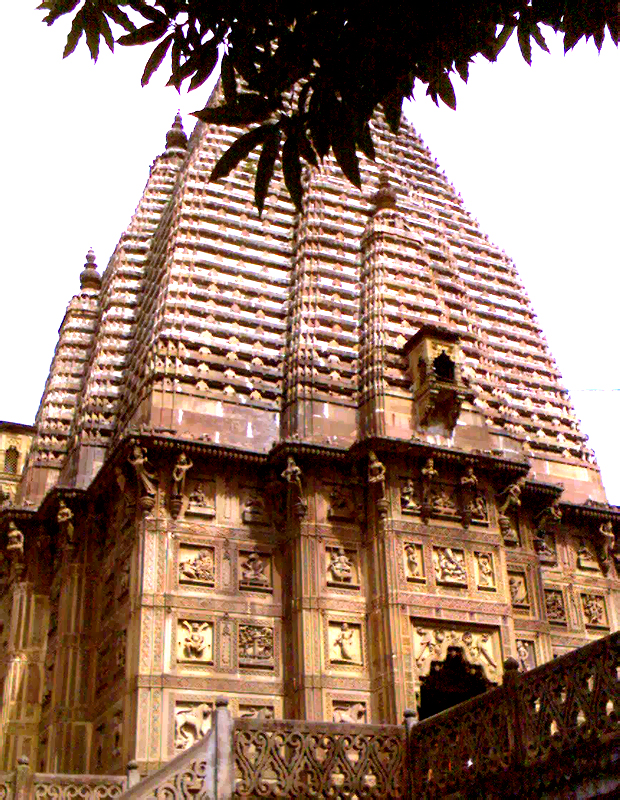

- Location in Uttar Pradesh

Religion
- Affiliation: Hinduism
- Deity: Durga
- Festival: Navratri

Location
- Location: Varanasi
- State: Uttar Pradesh
- Country: India
- Coordinates: 25.2821°N 83.0399°E

Architecture
- Type: Mandir
- Completed: c. 1770 CE

The Durga Mandir (Temple) is situated in Ramnagar of Banaras (or Varanasi), and is dedicated to the Hindu deity Durga. The temple was built by the Kashi Naresh Maharaja Balwant Singh of Benares, who ruled the Benaras state (Varanasi) between 1738 and 1770;. The temple has a large stone built pond with it. The Durga Mandir boasts of its fine stone works, which is a fabulous example of north Indian stone work arts.

There is another Durga temple, within the Varanasi city, built in the 18th century overlooking a pond known as Durga Kund.

== Temple structure ==
The temple is based on square shape. It has a square campus. The main building of temple is built of a square shaped stage. The shape of building is also square. The stage of the temple contains rooms in it, which are used for temple's staff purposes and sometimes, for Yajna. The campus is a green campus with trees and plants. Visitor can walk around the main temple building in the campus. It's useful since, some worshippers walk around the building of temples for religious reasons in Hinduism.

The temple has a huge square pond (Pushkarni) in front of it. The pond is with stone stairs in all sides and four watch pillars on each corner. There is a shade made of stone also at one side of the pond.

The stone work on the walls of temple building also emphasises the square shape. The temple wall has designs built in square shaped blocks and ornamental scrawls.

== History ==
The temple was built by the Kashi Naresh Maharaja Balwant Singh of Benares, who ruled the Benaras state (Varanasi) between 1738 and 1770; the person who also built the Ramnagar fort. He was succeeded by his son Raja Chait Singh (Chet Singh) in 1770. The Benaras state was then the vassal of the Nawab of Oudh Shuja-Ud-Daula. After the death of Nawab of Oudh in 1775, the first governor general of British India Warren Hastings decided to take over the governance of the Benaras state. He imposed unrealistic taxes like 2.3 million rupees and an additional war tax of 5 lakhs rupees on Raja Chait Singh which was reluctantly paid by the king. In 1778 the East India company demanded 2000 mounted troop from raja Chait Singh which was ignored by the king. Later the company reduced its demand to 1000 mounted troops. King offered the company 500 mounted and 500 foot soldiers which accepted by the company but king failed to provide such soldiers. Warren Hastings ordered the two sepoy companies to arrest the king of Benaras. The sepoy companies invaded the capital of Benaras state Ramnagar from its western side. The durga temple situated at the boundary of the western side of the capital Ramnagar and hence became the first victim of that attack. The British sepoy company tried to demolish the temple by canons. Several rounds of canon were fired on the temple and a major portion of the temple was destroyed. A brown patch marked by rounds of canon on the top of the temple is evidently telling the story of that attack. After a fierce war between the army of Benaras and the British East India company, the army of Benaras lost the battle. The king somehow escaped from the fort of Ramnagar by a tunnel and was exiled for 30 years. After this the Benaras state came under the paramountcy of the British Empire and was ruled by successor of Raja Chait Singh under the name of the Queen of the United Kingdom. The new rulers of Benaras state wanted to reconstruct the damaged portion of the temple exactly same as the original but due to the intricate design of the temple no one came forward. The king announced hefty prize for building the temple. One person came forward and promised the king to make the temple exactly the same as the original and in the case of his failure, he will jump off the top of the temple and kill himself. He built the entire temple exactly the same but failed to reconstruct the top design of the temple. When he realised that he has failed in his promise he jumped off the top of the temple. His genius work can be compared now by detailed visualisation of the sculptures which survived the attack the sculptures which was built by him.

It was also believed that the temple originally devoted to Lord Vishnu but due to some paranormal activities in the temple compound, the Brahmins of the court of the king suggested to convert the temple to deity Durga.

== Picture gallery ==
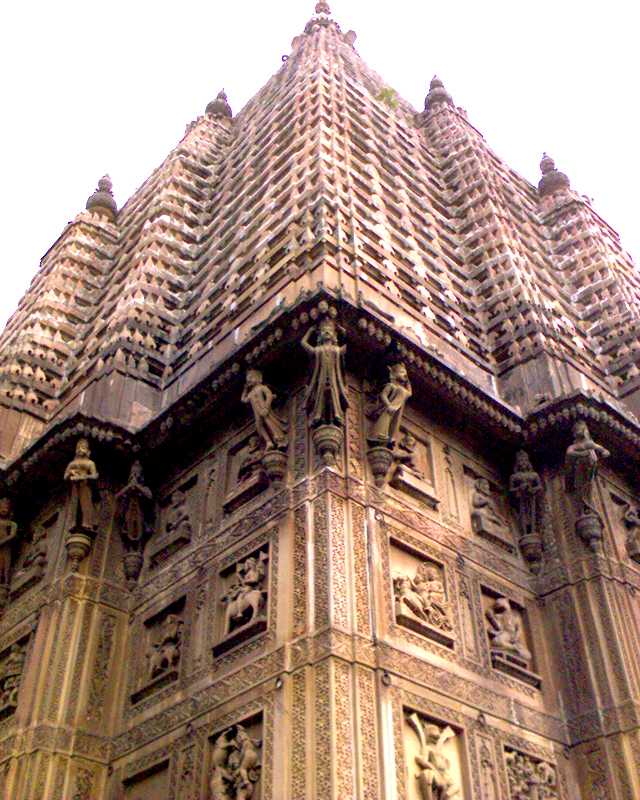
Corner View

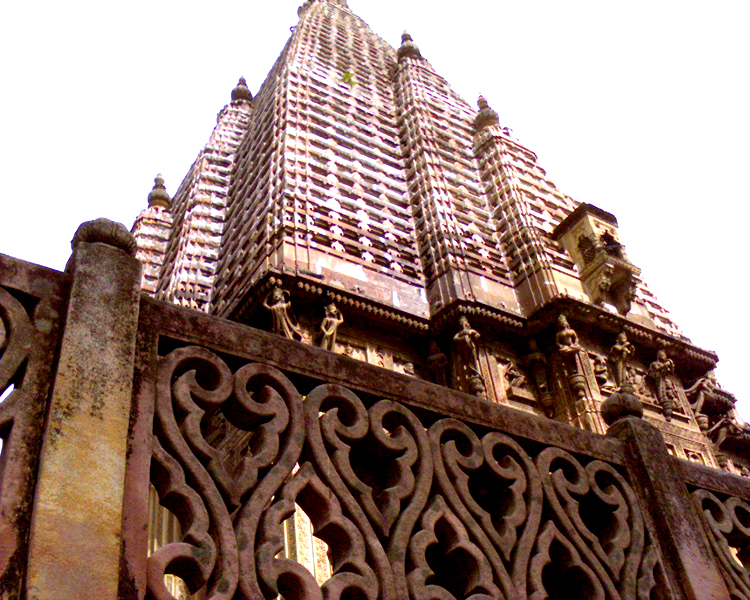
Front - Left Corner View

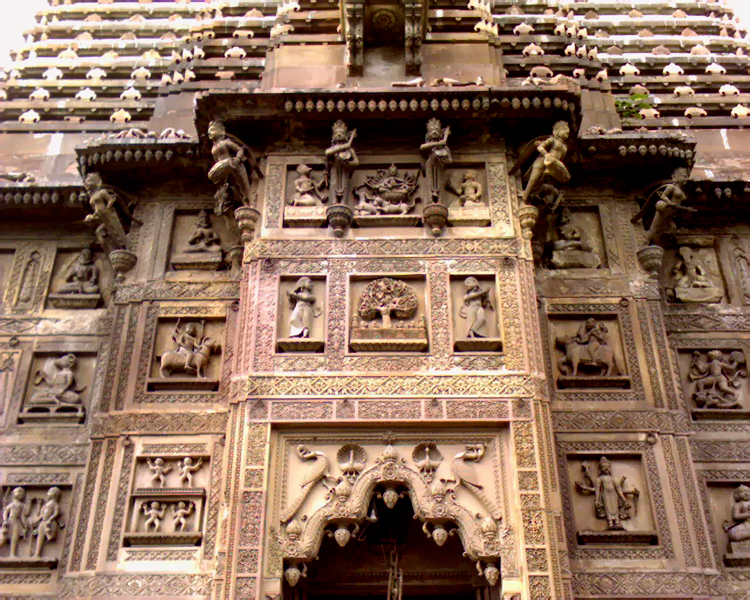
Front

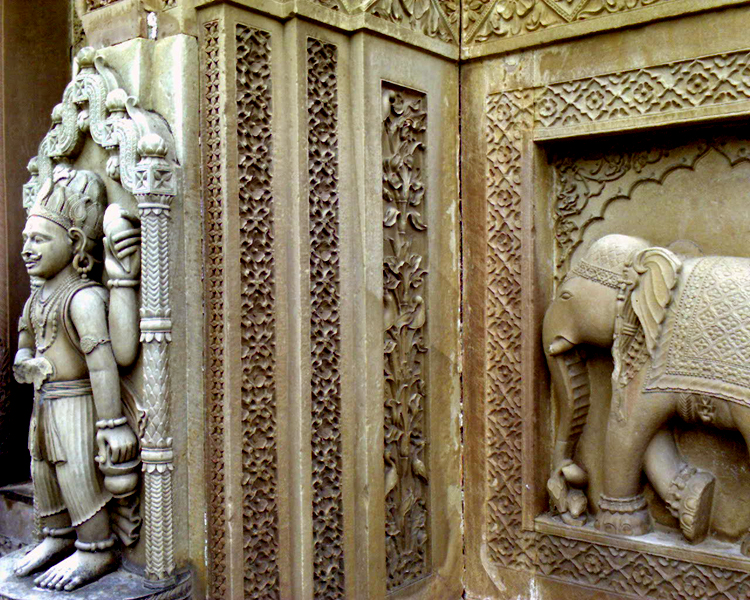
Wall Stone work

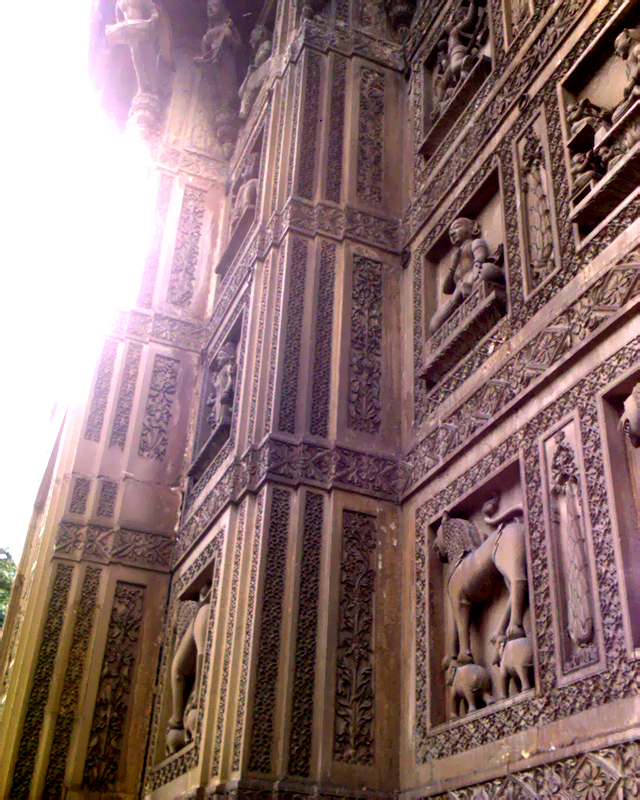
Wall Stone work

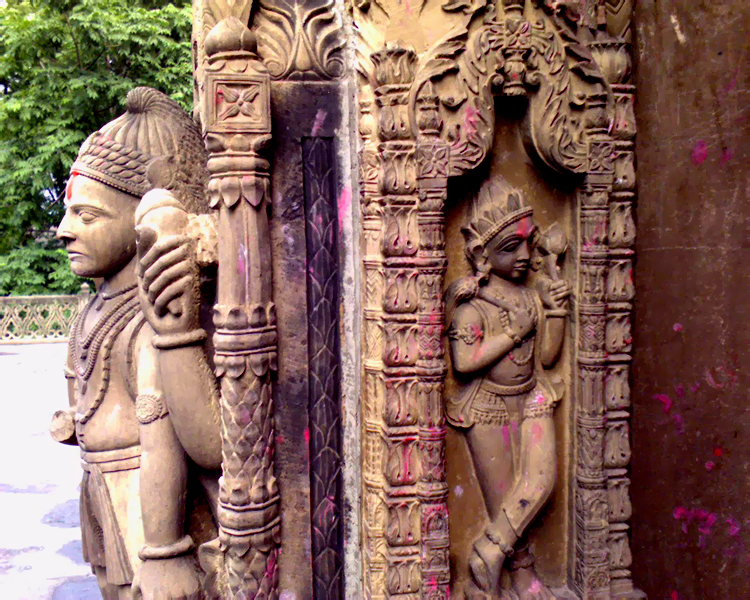
Wall Stone Work

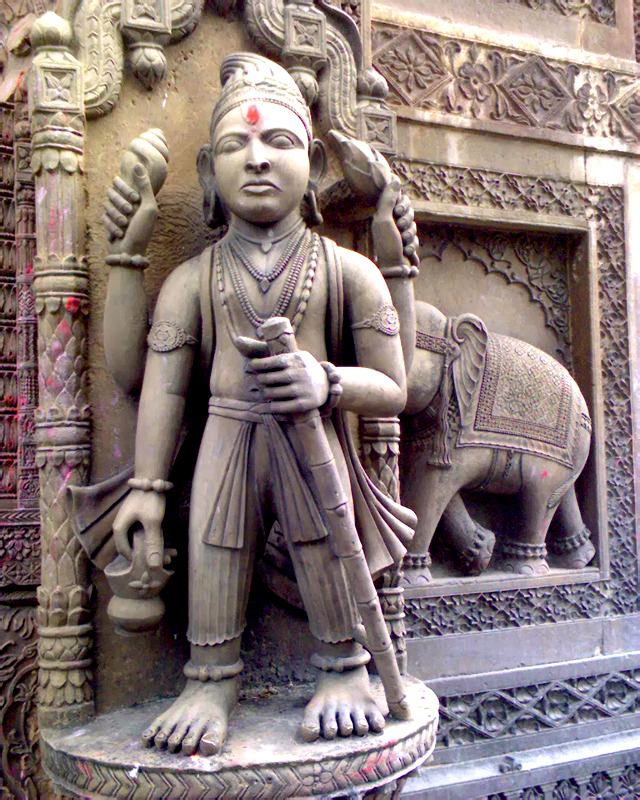
Wall Stone work and Sculpture

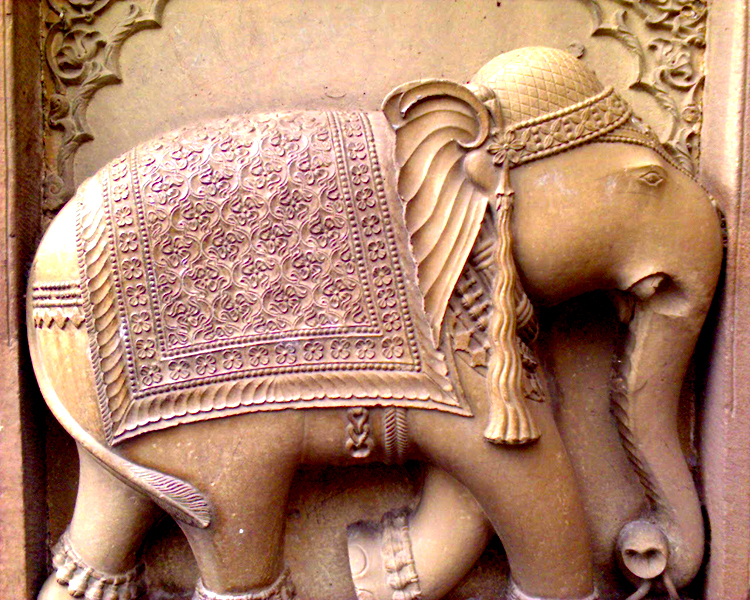
Stone Elephant on Wall

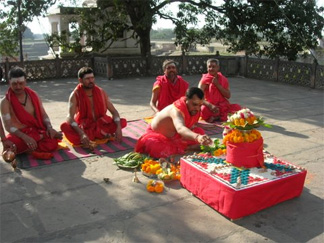
Yajna at the temple

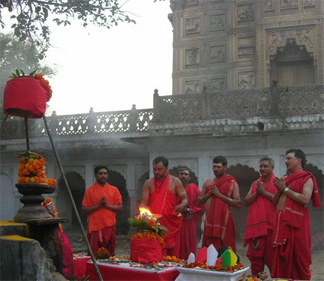
Yajna at the temple

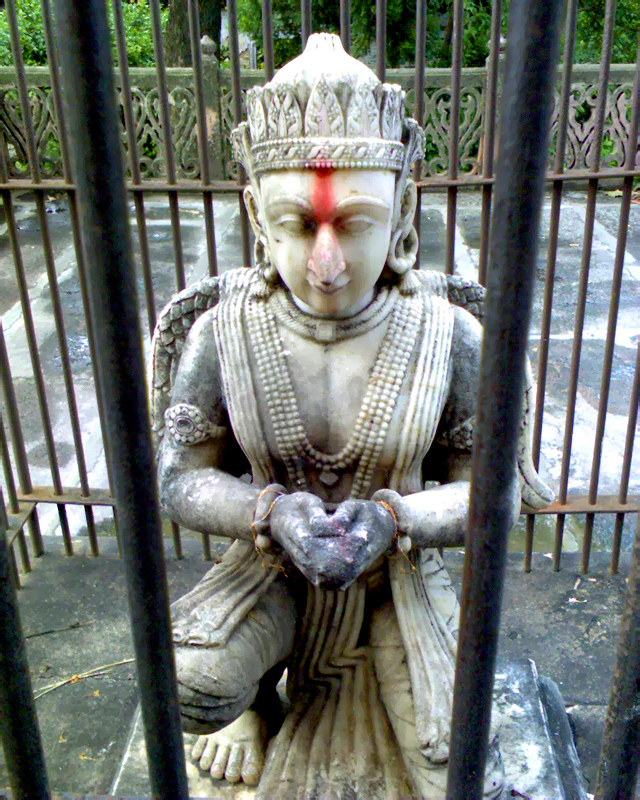
Sculpture

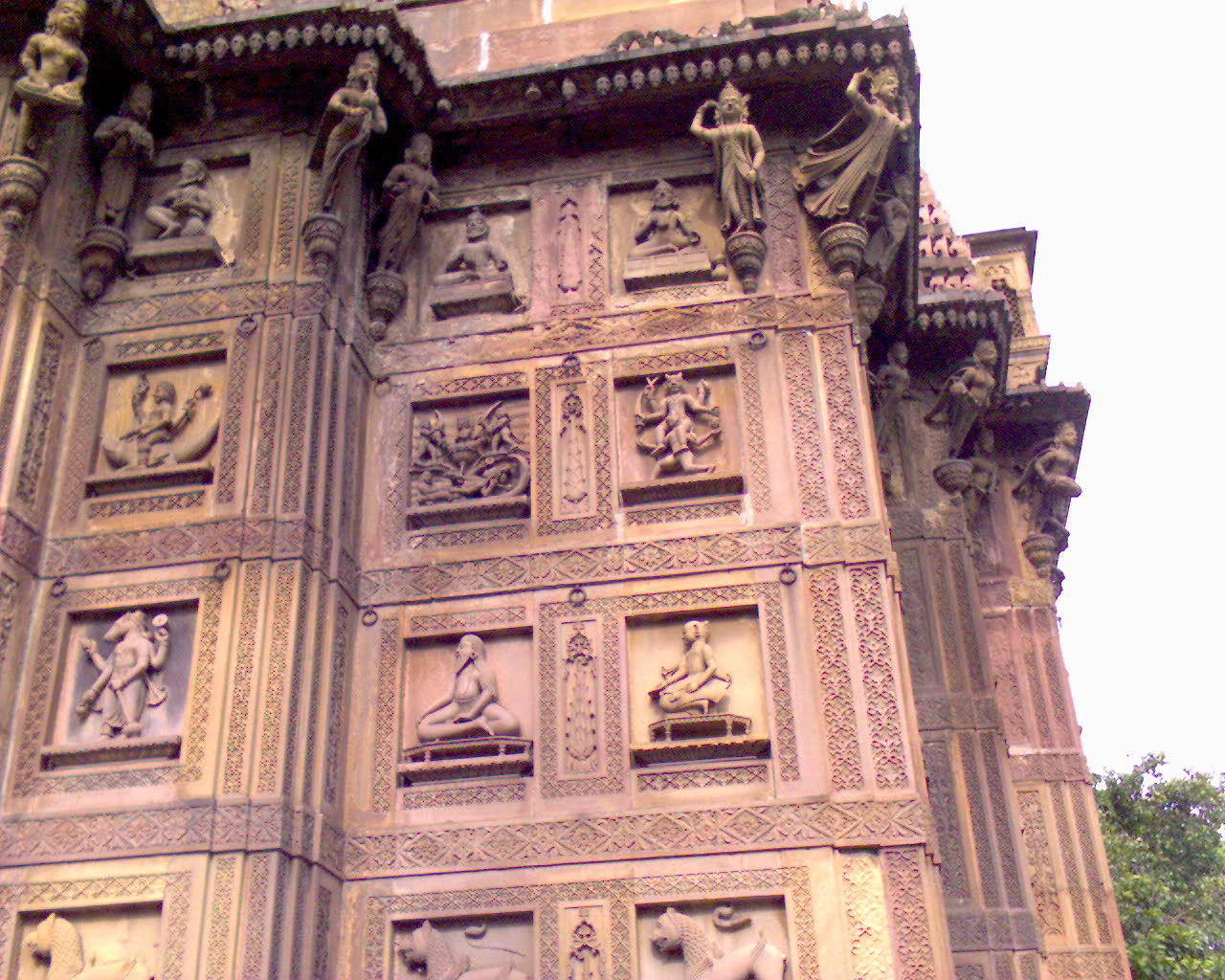
Side View

== See also ==
- Banaras or Varanasi
- Kashi Vishwanath Temple
- Sankat Mochan Hanuman Temple
