= Sun temple =

Religious building dedicated to solar deities and/or the Sun

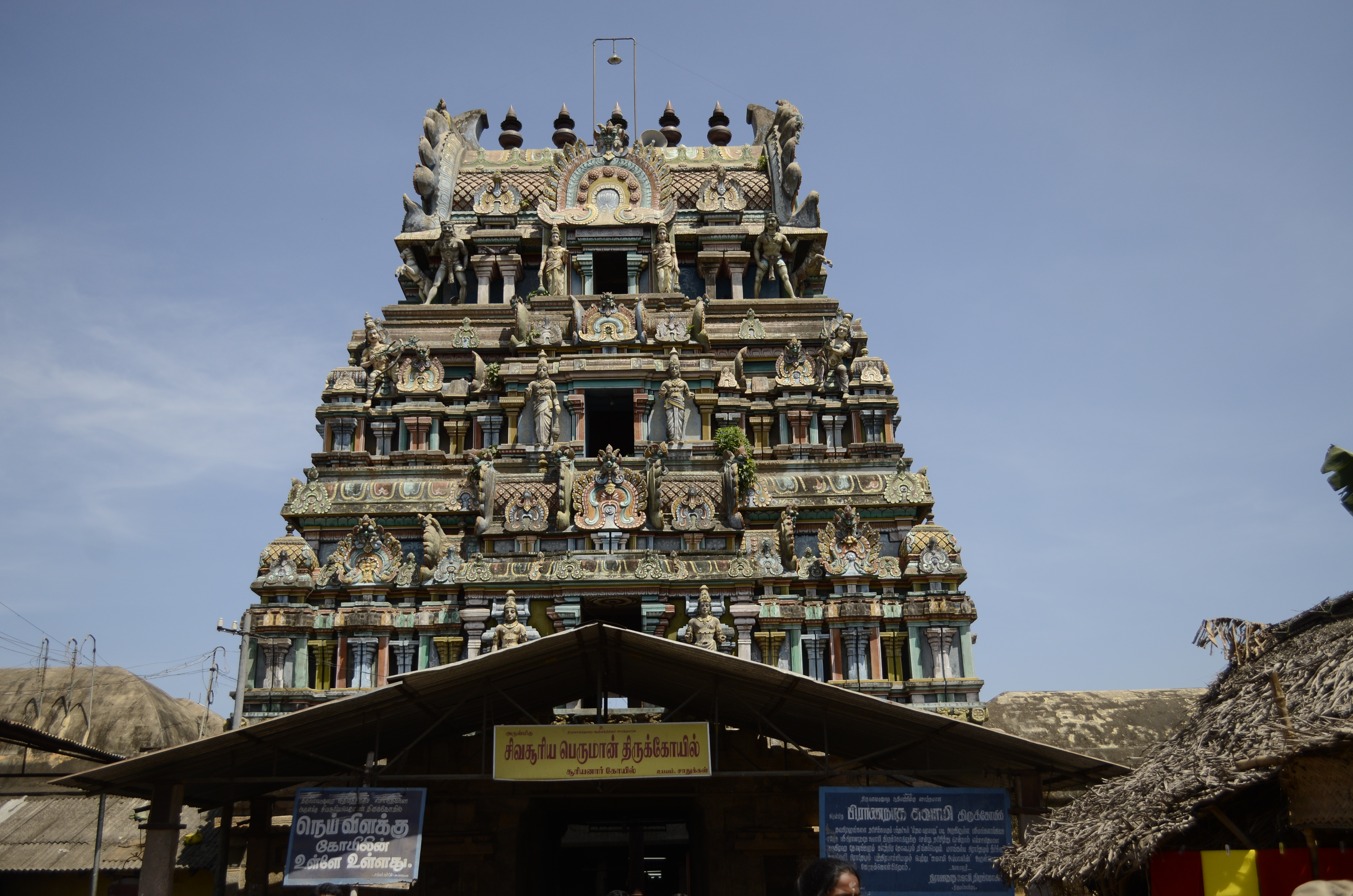
The 11th century Suryanar temple dedicated to the Hindu Sun-god Surya is still in active worship.

A sun temple (or solar temple) is a building used for religious or spiritual activities, such as prayer and sacrifice, dedicated to the sun or a solar deity. Such temples were built by a number different cultures and are distributed around the world including in India, China, Egypt, Japan and Peru. Some of the temples are in ruins, undergoing excavation, preservation or restoration and a few are listed as World Heritage Sites individually or as part of a larger site, such as Konark.

== China ==
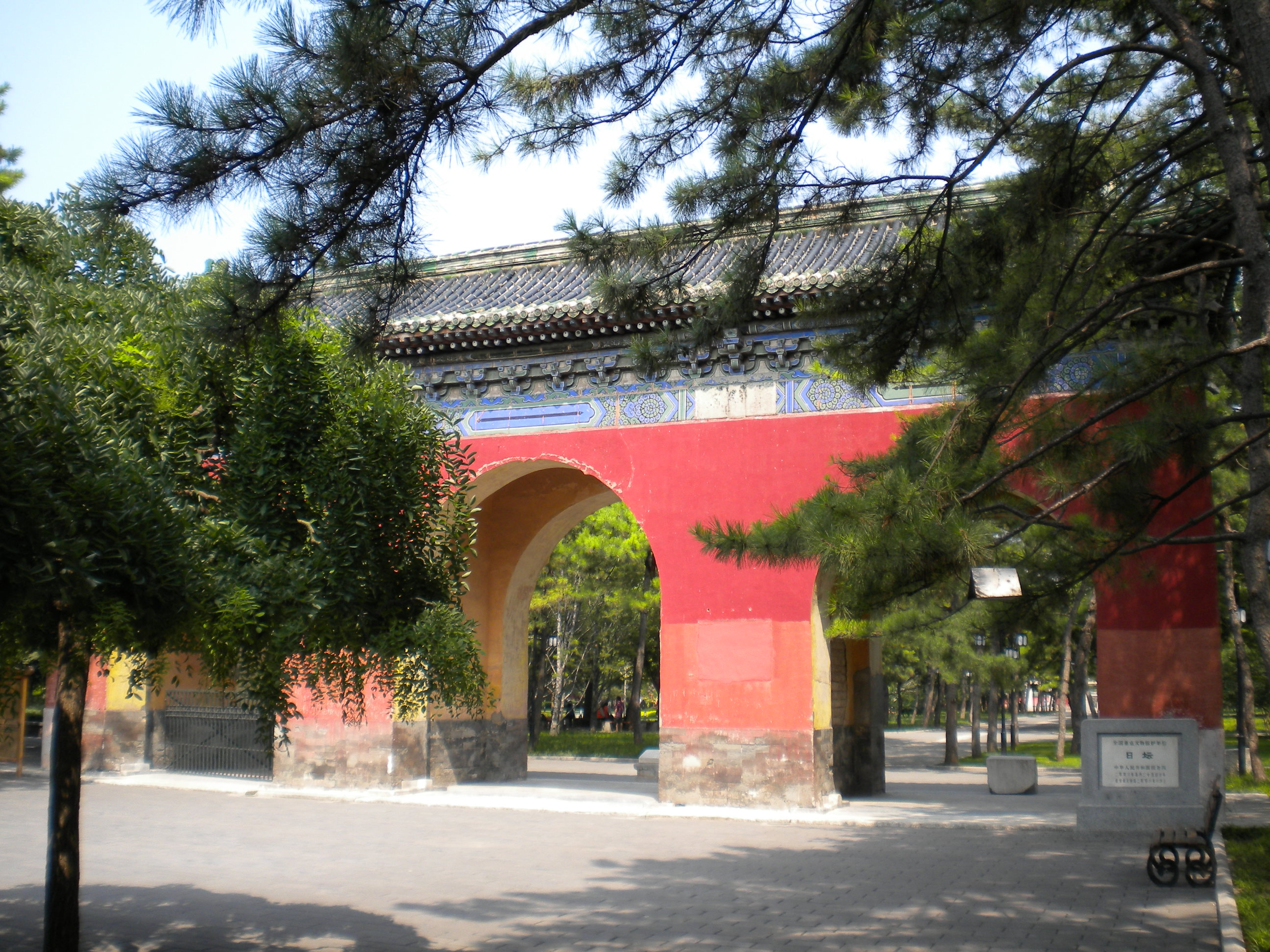
West Holy Gate, Temple of the Sun (Beijing)

The Temple of the Sun in Beijing, China, was built in 1530 during the Ming dynasty by the Jiajing Emperor, together with new temples dedicated to the Earth and the Moon, and an expansion of the Temple of Heaven. The Temple of the Sun was used by the imperial court for elaborate acts of worship involving fasting, prayers, dancing and animal sacrifices, as part of a year-long cycle of ceremonies involving all the temples. An important element was the colour red, which was associated with the Sun, including red utensils for food and wine offerings, and red clothes for the emperor to wear during the ceremonies. The temple is now part of a public park.

== Egypt ==
A plan of Userkaf's temple

In ancient Egypt, there were a number of sun temples. Among these old monuments is the Great Temple of Ramses at Abu Simbel, and complexes built by the Fifth Dynasty, of which only two examples survive, that of Userkaf and of Niuserre. The Fifth Dynasty temples usually had three components, a main temple building at a higher elevation, accessed by a causeway, from a much smaller entrance building. In 2006, archaeologists found ruins underneath a market in Cairo, which could possibly be the largest temple built by Ramesses II.

== India ==
Surya Sun temples of the Indian subcontinent
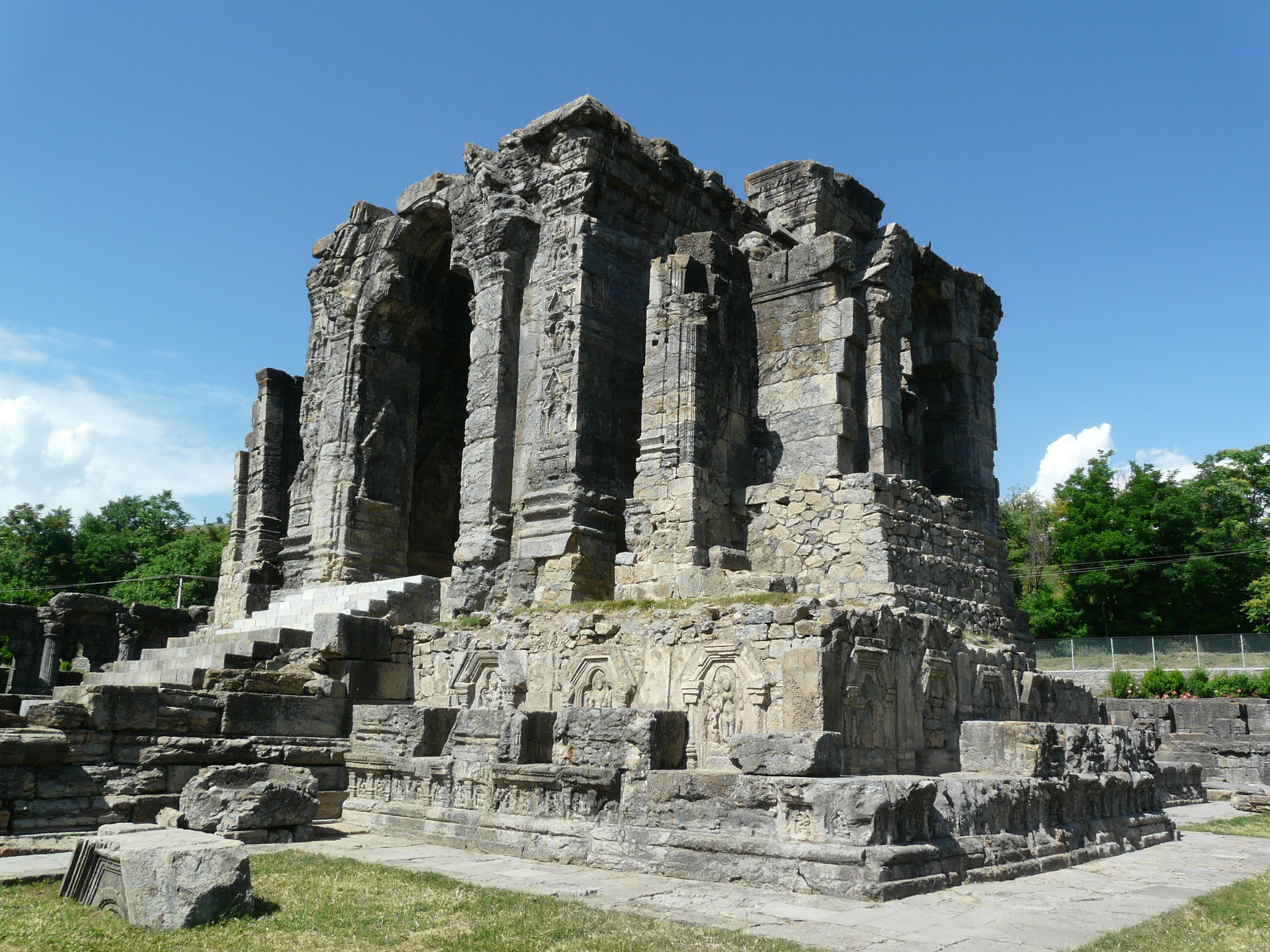
Martand Sun Temple Central shrine, dedicated to the deity Surya. The temple complex was built by the third ruler of the Karkota dynasty, Emperor Lalitaditya Muktapida, in the 8th century CE. It is one of the largest temple complex on the Indian subcontinent.

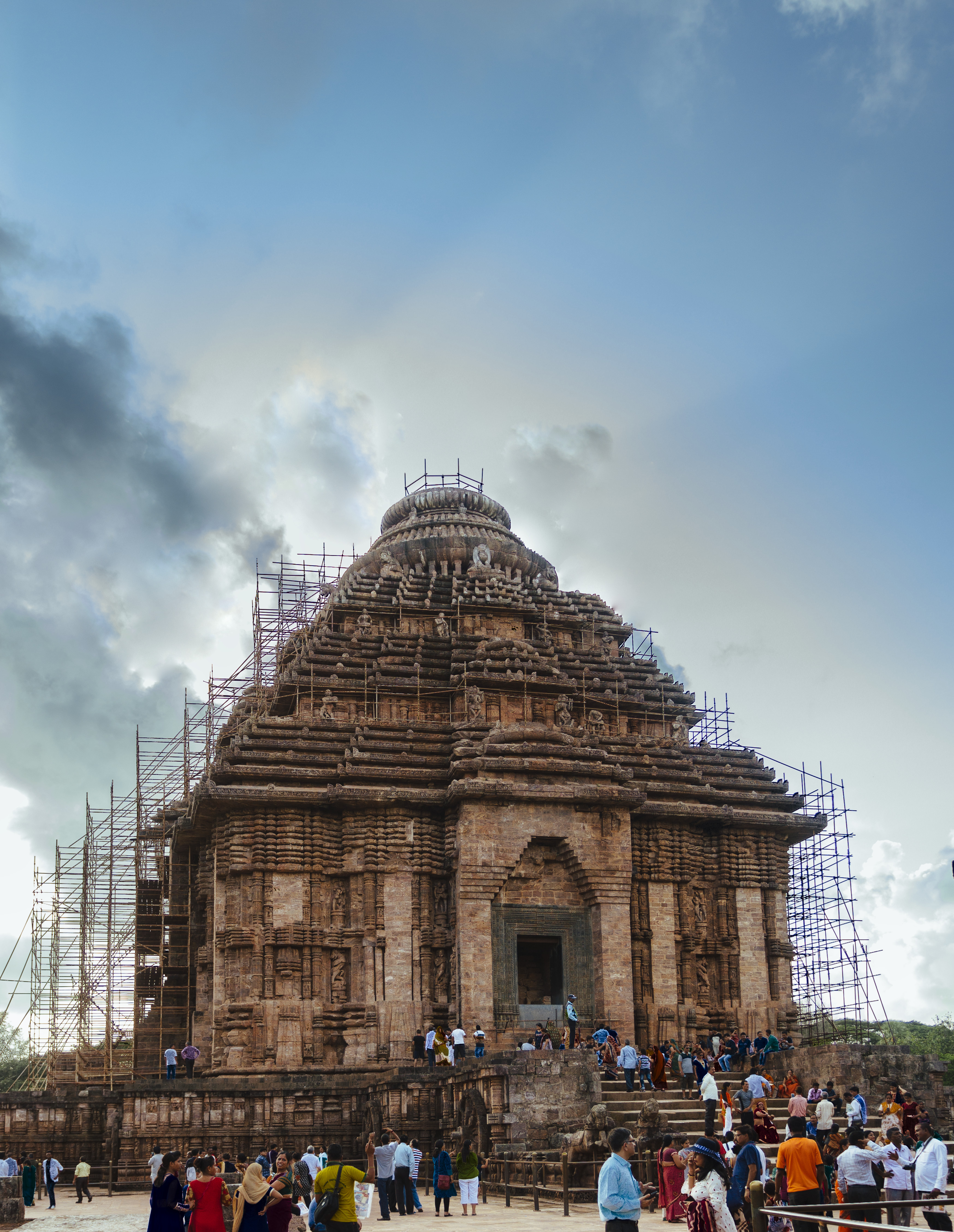
Konark Sun Temple at Konark, Odisha, built by Emperor Narasingha Deva I (1238–1264 CE) of the Eastern Ganga dynasty, it is now a World Heritage Site.

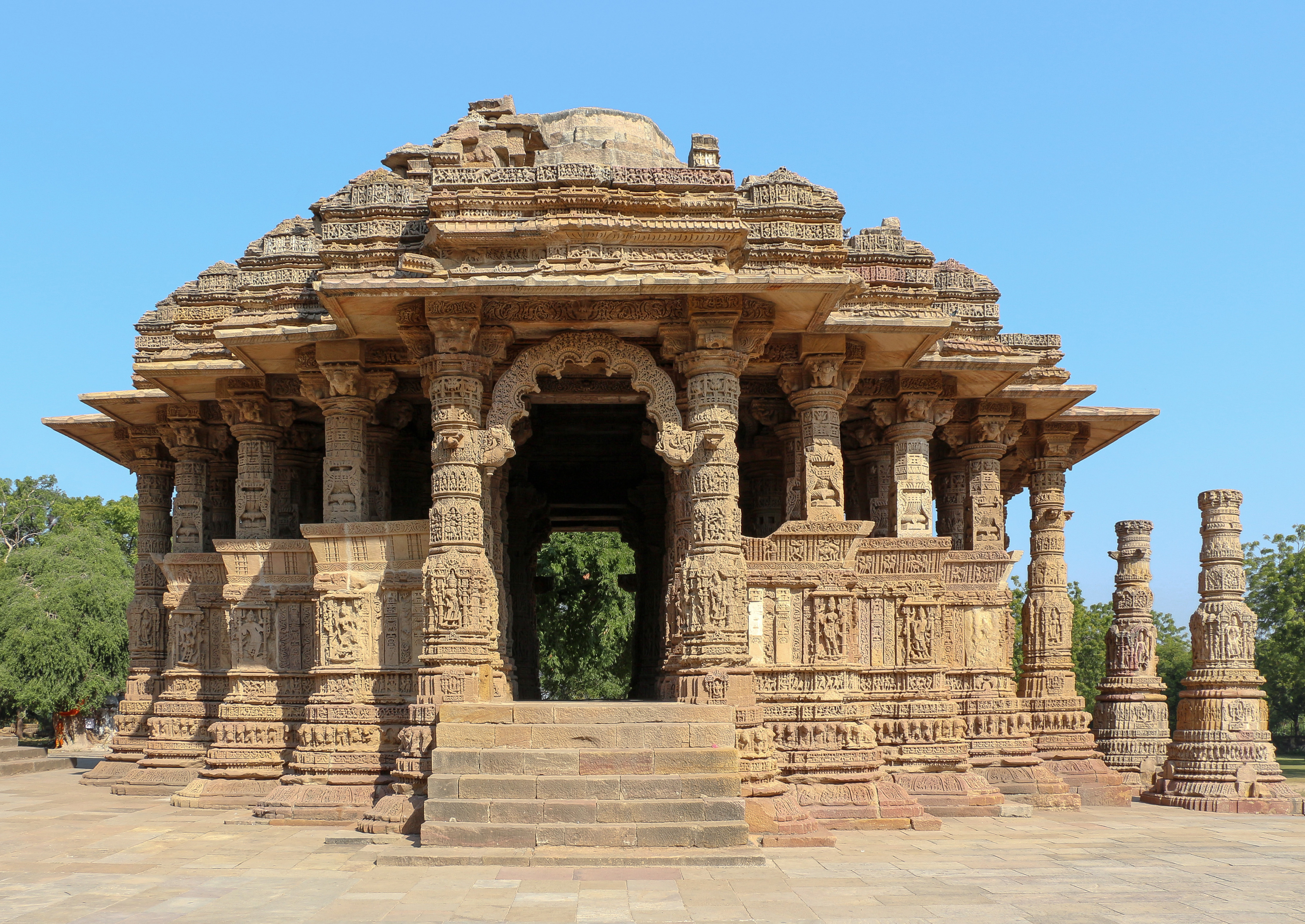
Sun Temple of Modhera, with stepwell surrounding the Kunda (tank), was built by Bhima I of Chaulukya dynasty in 1026 CE. It is one of the finest example of stepwell architecture of Gujarat.

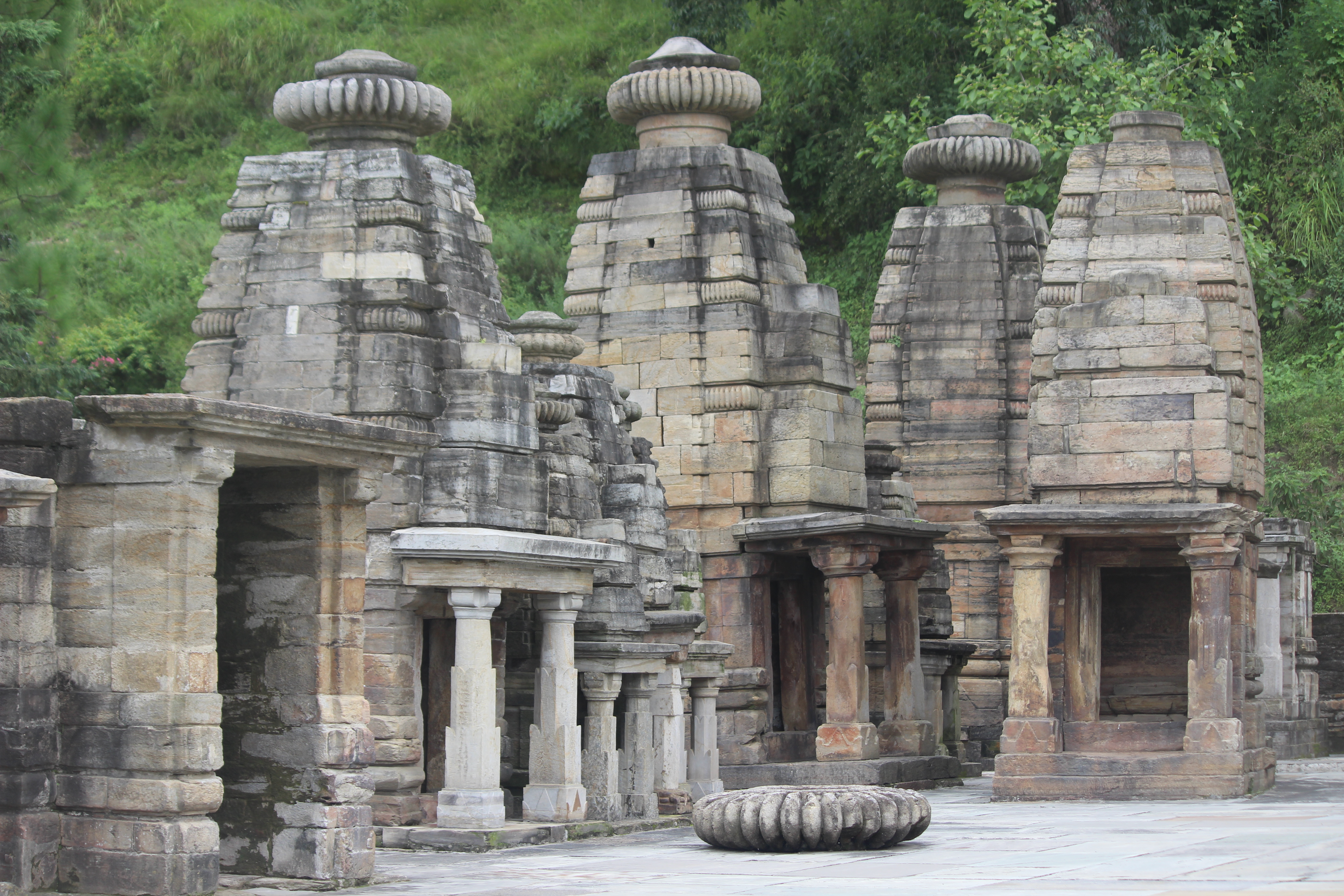
Katarmal Sun Temple constructed by the Katyuri Kings in the 9th century CE.

The sun temples of the Indian subcontinent are dedicated to the Hindu deity Surya, with the most prominent among them being the Konark Sun Temple (also known as the Black Pagoda), a UNESCO World Heritage Site. at Konark in Odisha and the Sun Temple at Modhera, Gujarat, built in 1026–1027. Both are now ruins, having been destroyed by invading Muslim armies. Konark was constructed around 1250, by Narasimhadeva I of the Eastern Ganga Dynasty. Surya was an important deity in early Hinduism, but sun worship largely declined as a principal deity around the 12th century. In Manipuri mythology, the sun god Korouhanba is the synonym of the Hindu deity Surya. Other Surya or sun temples in the Indian subcontinent include:

- Andhra Pradesh
  - Surya Narayana Temple at Arasavalli in Andhra Pradesh built in 7th century by king Devendra Varma, ruler of Kalinga. The temple is constructed in such a way that on the day of Radhasaptami, the Sun's rays directly fall on the feet of the Sri Suryanarayana Swami, the deity at the temple.
  - Suryanarayana Swamy Temple at Gollala Maminada, Andhra Pradesh.
- Assam
  - Surya Pahar Temple at Sri Surya Pahar in Assam built in 9th century
- Bihar
  - Deo Surya Mandir in Deo, Bihar
  - Kandaha Surya Mandir
  - Sitamarhi Surya Mandir
  - Navagraha Surya Mandir, Mangaldham
  - Bhaskar Temple at Gaya in Bihar
  - Bhaskar Temple at Parsa in Bihar
  - Bhaskar Temple at Patna in Bihar
  - Bhaskar Temple at Pitath
  - Bhaskar Temple at Bhakura
  - Bhaskar Chhth ghat, Selhauri in Belhauri
  - Manjesh Bhaskar Temple at
  - Budha Bhaskar temple at Garhara
  - Bhushan Bhaskar temple at Chain Singh Patti
  - Bhagwan Bhaskar Dham at Kurmuri in Arrah
  - Surya Temple at Sanda
  - Sumera Surya Mandir in Jehanabad District
  - Sun Temple at Nalanda
  - Sun Temple at Baragaon
  - Sun Temple at Nur Sarai
  - Sun Temple at Muzaffarpur
  - Sun Temple at Beraunti
  - Sun Temple at Chorsua
  - Sun Temple at Beldhana
  - Sun Temple at Koel Bigha
  - Sun Temple at Sirnawan
  - Sun Temple at Ben
  - Sun Temple at Shankardih
  - Sun Temple at Itasang
  - Sun Temple at Kundi, Bihar
  - Sun Temple at Alawan
  - Sun Temple at Lal Bigha, Nawada
  - Sun Temple at Soradih
  - Sun Temple at Bilari
- Gujarat
  - Modhera Sun Temple at Modhera in Gujarat, built in 1027 by King Bhimdev of the Chaulukya dynasty
  - Navlakha Temple, Ghumli, Gujarat, built in the 11th century.
  - Sun Temple, Thangadh
- Haryana
  - Within 48 Kos Parikrama of Kurukshetra
    - Within Borshyam Surya tirtha
    - Within Aaugandh Suryakunda
    - Within Habri Suryakunda
    - Within Sajuma Suryakunda
  - Surajkund, Faridabad
- Jammu and Kashmir
  - Martand Sun Temple, near Anantnag in Jammu and Kashmir built in 10th century
- Karnataka
  - Soorya Narayana Temple at Maroli, Mangalore, Karnataka
- Kerala
  - Adithyapuram Sun Temple
- Madhya Pradesh
  - Bhramanya Dev Temple at Unao, Balaji in Madhya Pradesh
  - Birla Sun Temple in Gwalior
  - Sun Temple, Madkhera is located in Madkhera, a small village situated on the North-West of Tikamgarh town at a distance of about 20 km. The entrance of the Sun temple is from the east and the Sun idol is placed inside.
- Maharashtra
  - Kanakaditya Temple at Kasheli in Ratnagiri
  - Suryanarayana temple, Narayana Chincholi, Dist. in Solapur
- Manipur
  - Ebudhou Korouhanba Temple, Moidangpok, Patsoi, Manipur
- Odisha
  - Biranchinarayan Temple, Palia, a 13th-century temple in Palia, Odisha.
- Tamil Nadu
  - Suryanar Kovil Temple at Kumbakonam in Tamil Nadu built in 1060-1118 CE
- Uttarakhand
  - Sun temple at Katharmal, near Almora and 70 km from Nainital was built in 9th century CE by the Katyuri kings.** Sun temple at Katharmal, near Almora and 70 km from Nainital was built in 9th century CE by the Katyuri kings.
- Uttar Pradesh
  - Rahila Sagar Sun Temple at Mahoba in Uttar Pradesh
  - Sun Temple at Kalpi in Uttar Pradesh
- West Bengal
  - Sonatapal, Bankura District, West Bengal
  - Gangaditya Temple, Murshidabad District, West Bengal
- Pakistan
  - Multan Sun Temple, also known as Aditya Sun Temple, in Multan in Punjab, Pakistan was destroyed by Muslim rulers in 10th century.

== Inca empire ==
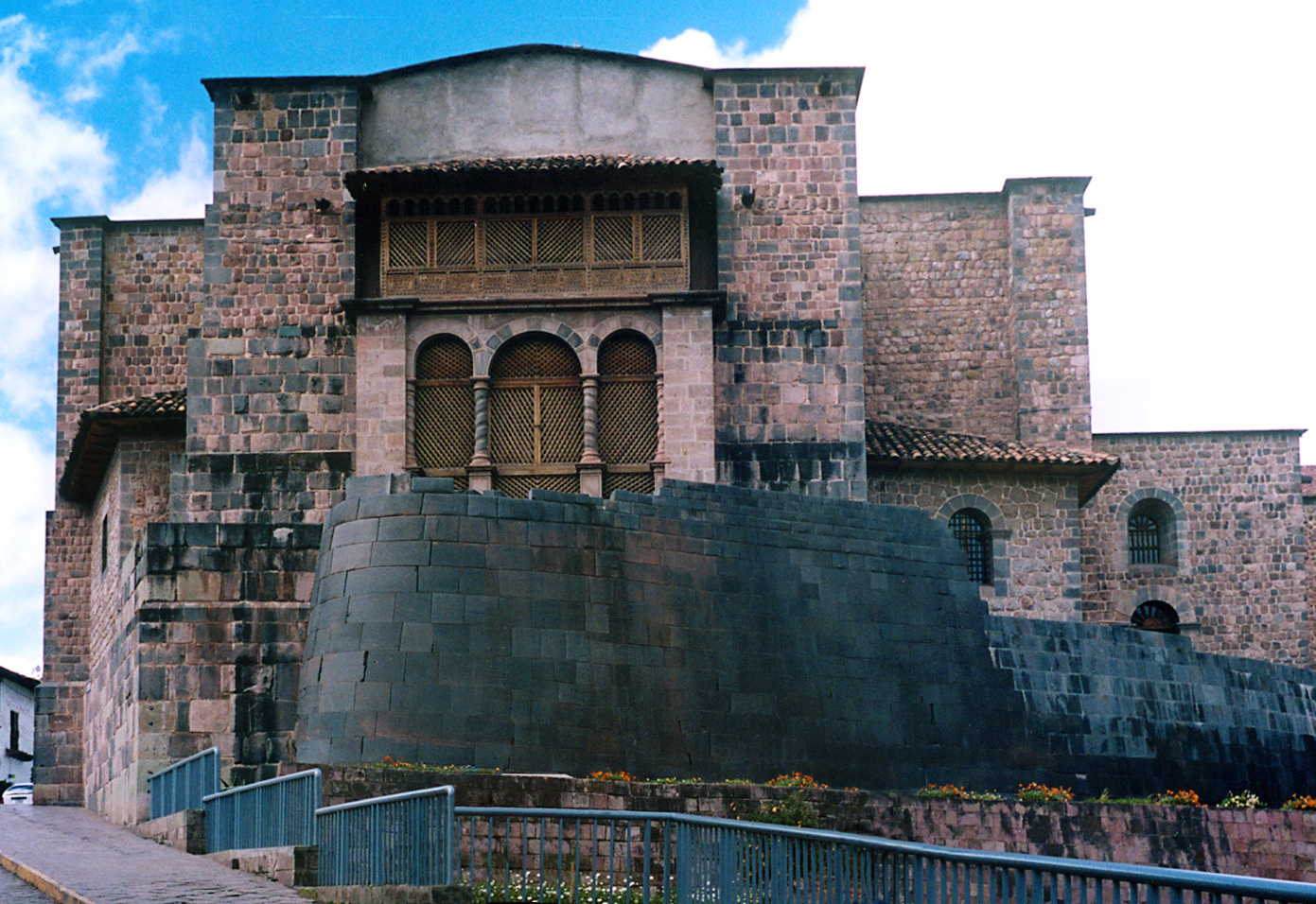
Qurikancha with Convent of Santo Domingo above

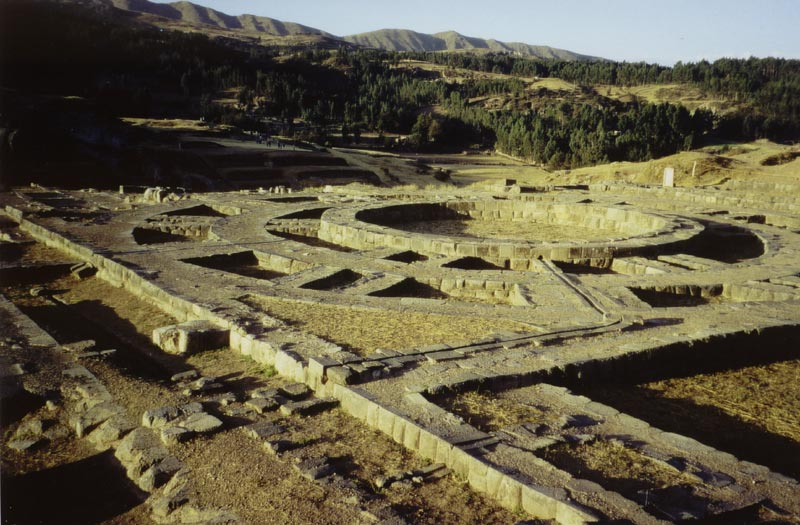
The base of the circular tower of the Inca Muyuq Marka still remains

The following are Pre-Columbian temples of Inti (the Inca god Sun):

- Qurikancha in Cusco, Peru, was the most important temple in the Inca Empire.
- Muyuq Marka in Cusco, Peru.
- Willkawaman in Vilcashuamán, Peru.

== Others ==
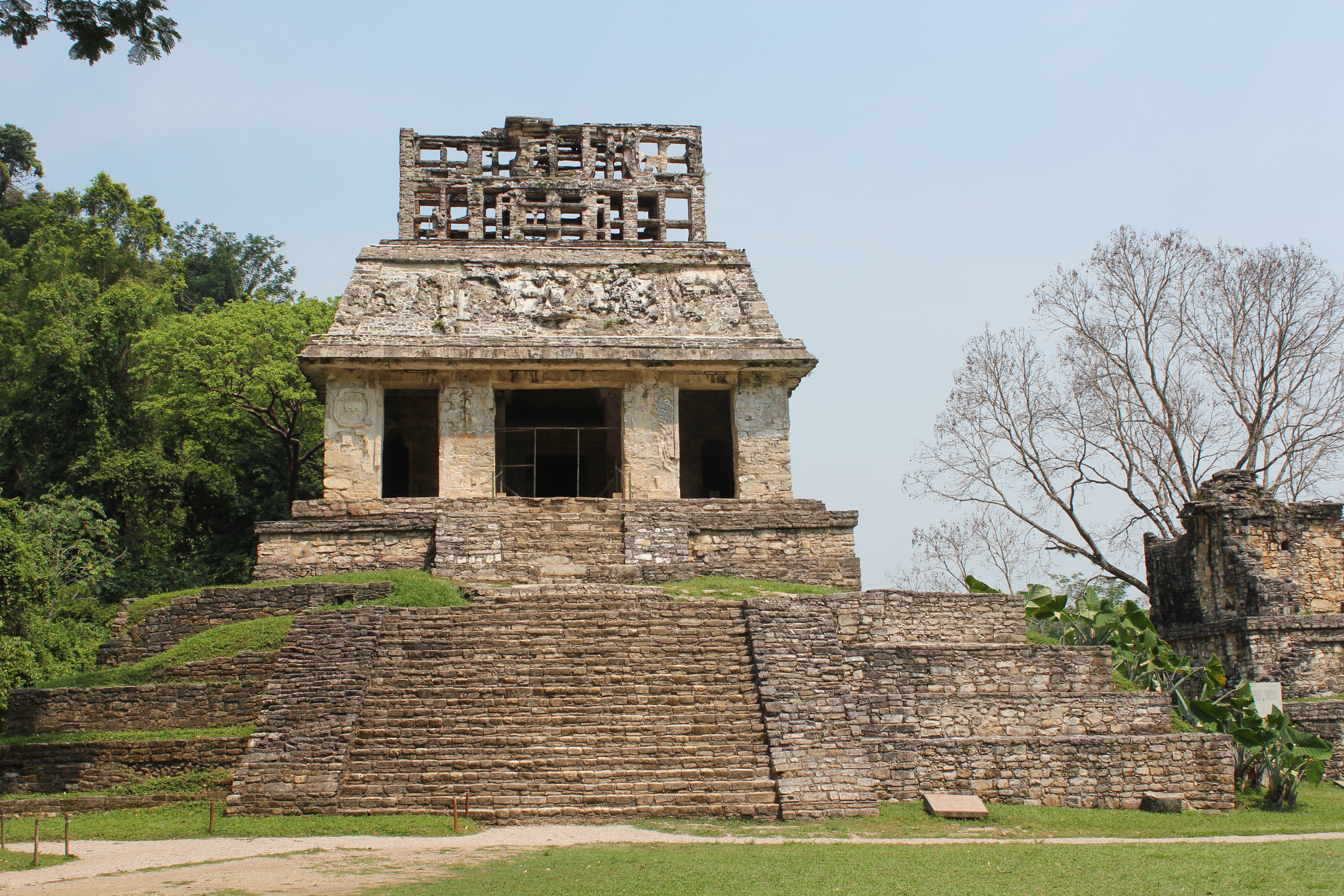
Maya Temple of the Sun in Palenque, Mexico.

There are also sun temple sites in a number of other countries:

- The Temple of the Sun in the Temple of the Cross Complex, at the Mayan site of Palenque, in southern Mexico, built sometime between 200 and 900 AD.
- The Temple of the Night Sun at the Mayan site of El Zotz, Guatemala, possibly abandoned in the fifth century.
- There are several Shinto shrines in Japan, dedicated to the sun goddess Amaterasu including:

- Ise Grand Shrine in Ise, Mie prefecture
- Amanawa Shinmei Shrine, founded in 710, in Kamakura
- Amanoiwato-jinja in Takachiho, Miyazaki prefecture

- In the Mesa Verde National Park in Colorado, United States, there is a structure which may have been used as a sun temple by the Pueblo culture, with construction thought to have begun in 1275 AD, although it does not seem to have been completed.

== Other usages ==
The name Temple of the Sun or Sun Temple was given to a folly which stood in Kew Gardens from 1761 until 1916. It was designed and built by William Chambers, who also planted a cedar tree next to the structure earlier, in 1725. In 1916, a storm brought down the cedar tree, which destroyed the folly in the process.

== See also ==
- Fire temple
- Temple of the Moon (disambiguation)
- Temple of the Stars
