= K K University =

University in Nalanda, Bihar, India

K. K. University
- Motto: Knowledge, Skills and Wisdom
- Type: State Private University
- Established: 2017
- Affiliations: UGC
- Chancellor: Er. Ravi Chaudhary
- Vice-Chancellor: Dr. Badiadka Narayana
- Location: Beraunti, Nalanda, Bihar, India; 25°07′54″N 85°31′45″E
- Website: kkuniversity.ac.in

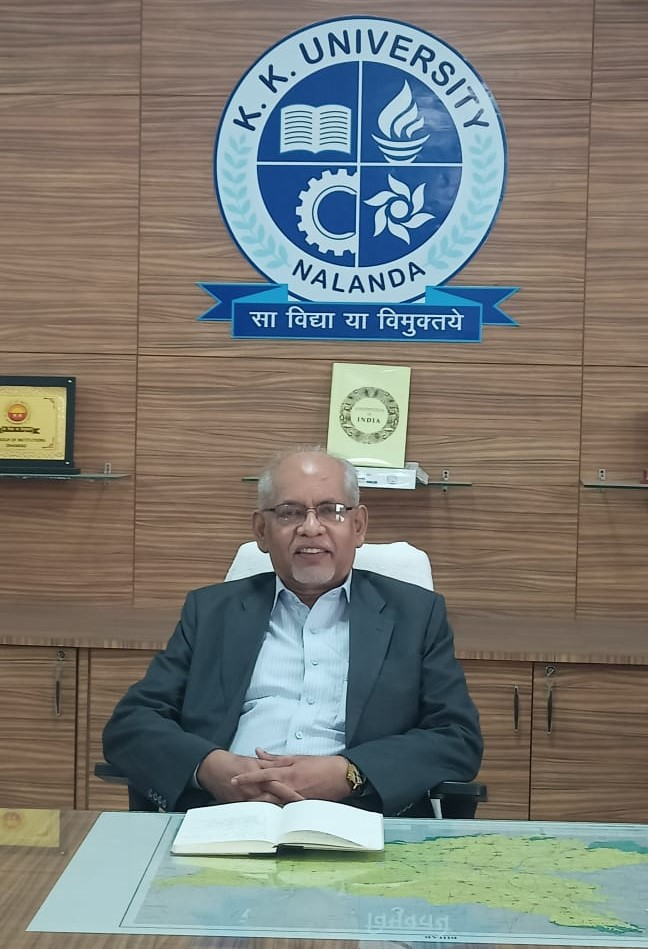
Dr. Narayana, the Vice Chancellor

K. K. University (KKU) is a state private university located in Beraunti, near Bihar Sharif in Nalanda district, Bihar, India. The university was established in 2017 by Samajik Kalyan Sanstha under the Bihar Private Universities Act, 2013, one of the two first private universities in Bihar.

Both universities were approved by the Bihar Government in May 2017 following the passing of Private Universities (Amendment) Bill, 2017 in March 2017 which relaxed the rules for establishment of private universities in Bihar.

The 2017 law allowed a new private university to operate from a premises measuring 5,000 m² (down from 10,000 m² previously) for four years (up from two years previously) before shifting to the place designated in the project report.

== Vice Chancellor ==
Prof. Dr. Badiadka Narayana - Feb 2024 - Currently
