= Unao, Madhya Pradesh =

Unao
- Town
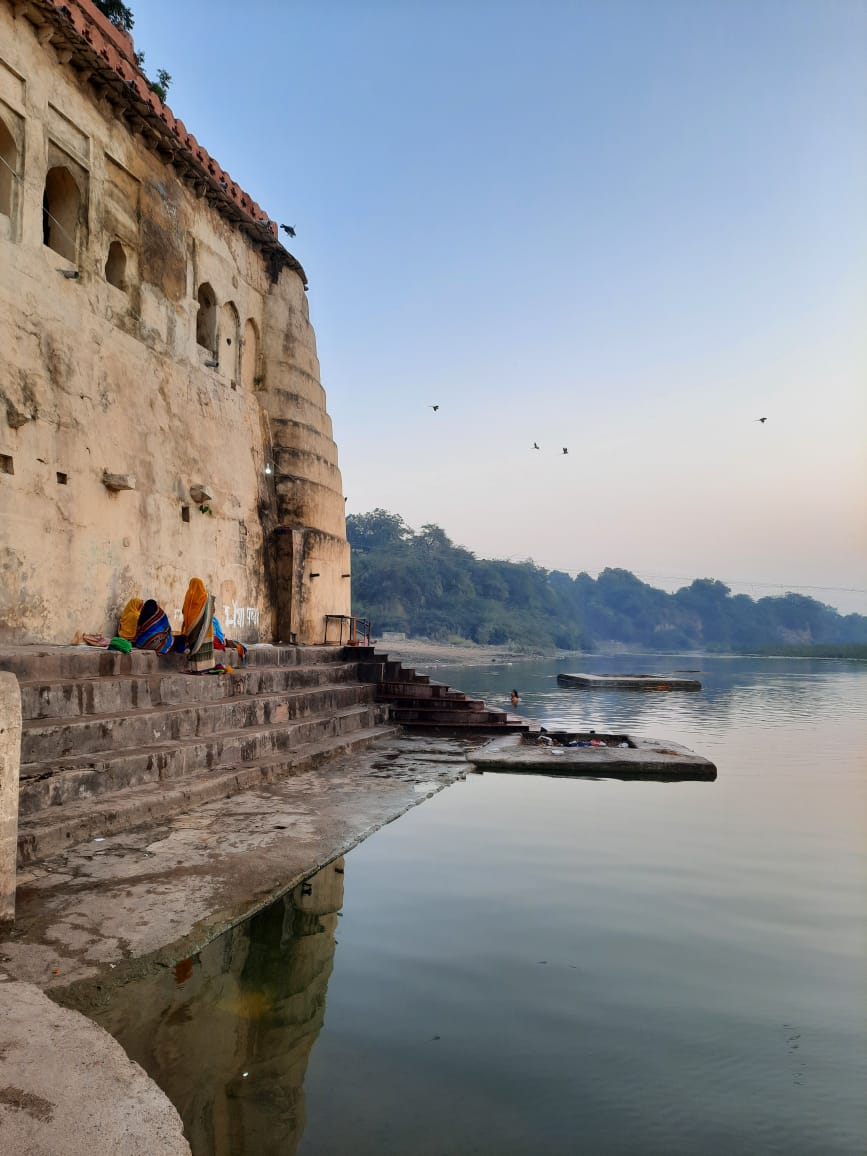
- Pahuj nadi Ghat unao balaji view

- Location in Madhya Pradesh, India
- Coordinates: 25.57°N 78.60°E
- Country: India
- State: Madhya Pradesh
- District: Datia

Government
  - Type: Gram Panchayat

Population (2011)
  - Total: 8,182

Languages
  - Official: Hindi
- Time zone: UTC+5:30 (IST)
- Pin Code: 475671
- Vehicle registration: MP-32

Uano is a major town located in Datia District of Madhya Pradesh, it's located on Bank of Pahuj River. There's a police station in the town.

== Demographics ==
As per the Census of India 2011 Unao Town has population of 8,182 of which 4,359 are males and 3,823 are females.

Literacy Rate: The village has an average literacy rate of 68.77% (Male: 77.08%, Female: 59.30%).

== Tourist attractions ==
Unao Balaji Sun Temple - The Sun Temple at Unao in Madhya Pradesh is unique in its architecture. The Sun God is the main deity of this temple. The Sun God stands on a brick platform covered with black plates. Twenty-one triangles, representing the 21 phases of the Sun are engraved in the shrine. Here, special worship is offered on Sundays. Local belief is that worshippers find relief from skin ailments at this temple.

== Transportation ==
Unao is 17 km away from Datia, 30 km away from Bhander and around 17 km from Jhansi. Public and private buses operate regularly. 475671 is Pin Code to Unao.

== See also ==
- Dinara
- Raun
