= Unao Balaji Sun Temple =

Surya temple in Madhya Pradesh, India

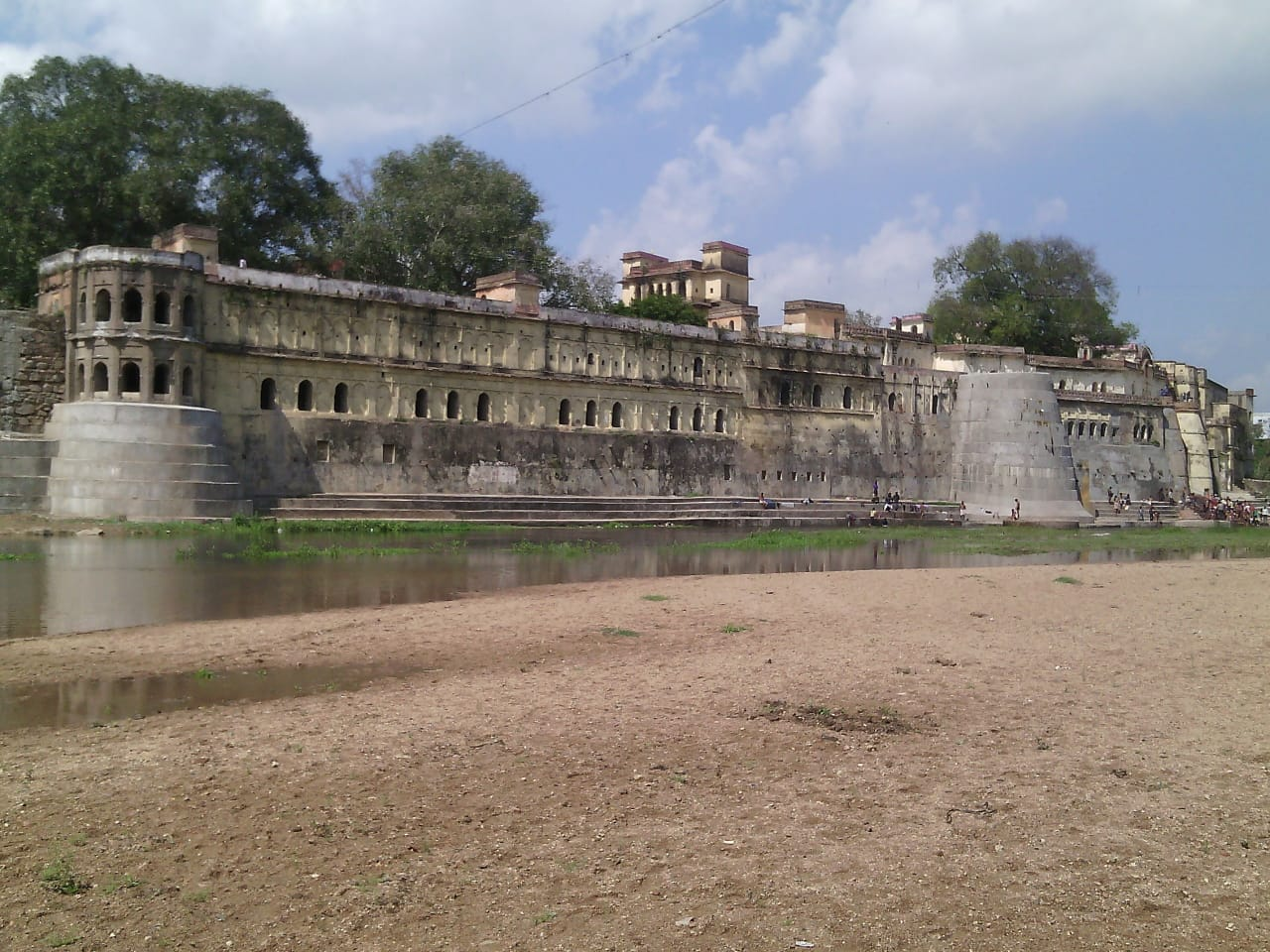
- Priest - Kachhi Kushwaha Kshatriya
- Interactive map of Unao Balaji Sun Temple
- Type: temple
- Location: Unao, Madhya Pradesh, India
- Region: Datia

History
- Built by: King of Datia

Unao Balaji Sun Temple, a famous and rare sun temple with its own unique architecture, is situated in a small town of Unao in Datia district of Madhya Pradesh. The Balaji temple was built in the pre-historic time by the king of Datia. Unnao Balaji Maharaj is worshiped by person of Kushwaha Kshatriya caste. Kachhi Kushwaha Kshatriya is the main priest of there.

== History and myth ==
It is said that a cow used to go to a particular place to graze in the outskirts of Unao. The cow every day pours her milk at that particular place. The cow belonged to a person of the "Kachhi", Kushwaha Kshatriya. The owner of cow was not aware of this incident. Once a person of Lodhi caste saw that the cow is pouring her milk on the earth. The people of this cast have the occupation of assassinating cows. He immediately grabbed the opportunity and assassinated the cow. On the following night, The sun deity came in the dreams of the king of Datia and told the king to dig him out from the location, where the cow used to pour her milk. Next morning, King called his boys and dug out the place and found a statue of the sun. He built a temple in Unao and established the statue on a brick platform, and as said by the sun, the owner of that cow has been assigned the priest. Since then only people belonging to "Kachhi" Kushwaha Kshatriya caste can only sit at the brick platform and offer garlands, prasadas to the deity. Elsewhere in India, only a person belonging to Brahmin caste can offer worship. The pilgrims and pandas(people belong to Brahmin caste)also take part in the worship of the deity but the main priest is said to be "Kachhi" Kushwaha Kshatriya caste people.

== Geography ==
The Balaji temple is situated in the vicinity of Unao. Unao is a small town which falls under Datia district in Madhya Pradesh. Unao is 17 km away from Datia and around 17 km from Jhansi (famous for Jhansi ki Raani, LakshmiBai) Jhansi. Unao, makes a segment of a circle with Datia and Jhansi being the crossing point of the chords in the segment. Unao can be reached by any of the two places. Jhansi is also a rail junction in the central railway. All the trains from Bhopal to Delhi are passed through Jhansi.

== Temple architecture ==
The Sun Temple at Unao in Madhya Pradesh is unique in its architecture. The Sun God is the main deity of this temple. The Sun God stands on a brick platform covered with black plates. Twenty-one triangles, representing the 21 phases of the Sun are engraved in the shrine. Here, special worship is offered on Sundays. Local belief is that worshippers find relief from skin ailments at this temple.

== Significance ==
The deity Balaji is very much famous for curing skin ailments. People from far distant places come and worship the deity. Below the temple, a river Pahooj is also flowing. There are some wells in the river, at the time of summer, people used to have bathe with the water in the wells. Sulphur content is found in the water of Pahooj river, which is helpful in treating skin diseases. It is said that if you have bathe in river and offer water to deity Balaji, all your incurable skin ailments will be cured within few days. Sunday is considered as the day of deity Balaji (Sun). All the inhabitants of Unao and the surrounding region has enormous faith in the deity and also have felt the power of it. Each family in Unao have at least one member in government jobs.
