= G. B. Pant National Institute of Himalayan Environment =

Indian think tank and research institute

Coordinates: 29°38′24″N 79°37′23″E

The G.B. Pant National Institute of Himalayan Environment is the focal agency of the Indian government to advance scientific knowledge about the Indian Himalayan Region, and to evolve integrated management strategies, demonstrate their efficacy for conservation of natural resources, and to ensure environmentally sound development in this region. The institute was formerly known as the G.B. Pant Institute of Himalayan Environment & Development, or GBPIHED.

== History ==
The institute was established in August 1988, during the birth centenary year of Bharat Ratna Pt. Govind Ballabh Pant, as an autonomous Institute of the Ministry of Environment, Forest & Climate Change (MoEF&CC), Govt. of India.

== Organisation and locations ==
The institute has a decentralized set-up, with its headquarters at Kosi-Katarmal, Almora. At the headquarters, the research and development activities of the institute are organised among four thematic centres located there. These are the Centre for Land & Water Resource Management; the Centre for Socio-Economic & Development; the Centre for Biodiversity Conservation & Management, and the Centre for Environmental Assessment & Climate Change.

As of August 2023, the institute also has six regional centres.The regional centres are at Srinagar (Garhwal Regional Centre), Mohal – Kullu (Himachal Regional Centre), Tadong - Gangtok (Sikkim Regional Centre), Itanagar (North East Regional Centre), Leh - Ladakh (Ladakh Regional Centre), and Mountain Division (at MoEF&CC, New Delhi).

The institute serves as the lead institution for the facilitation and coordination of ICIMOD's activities in India.

== Funding ==
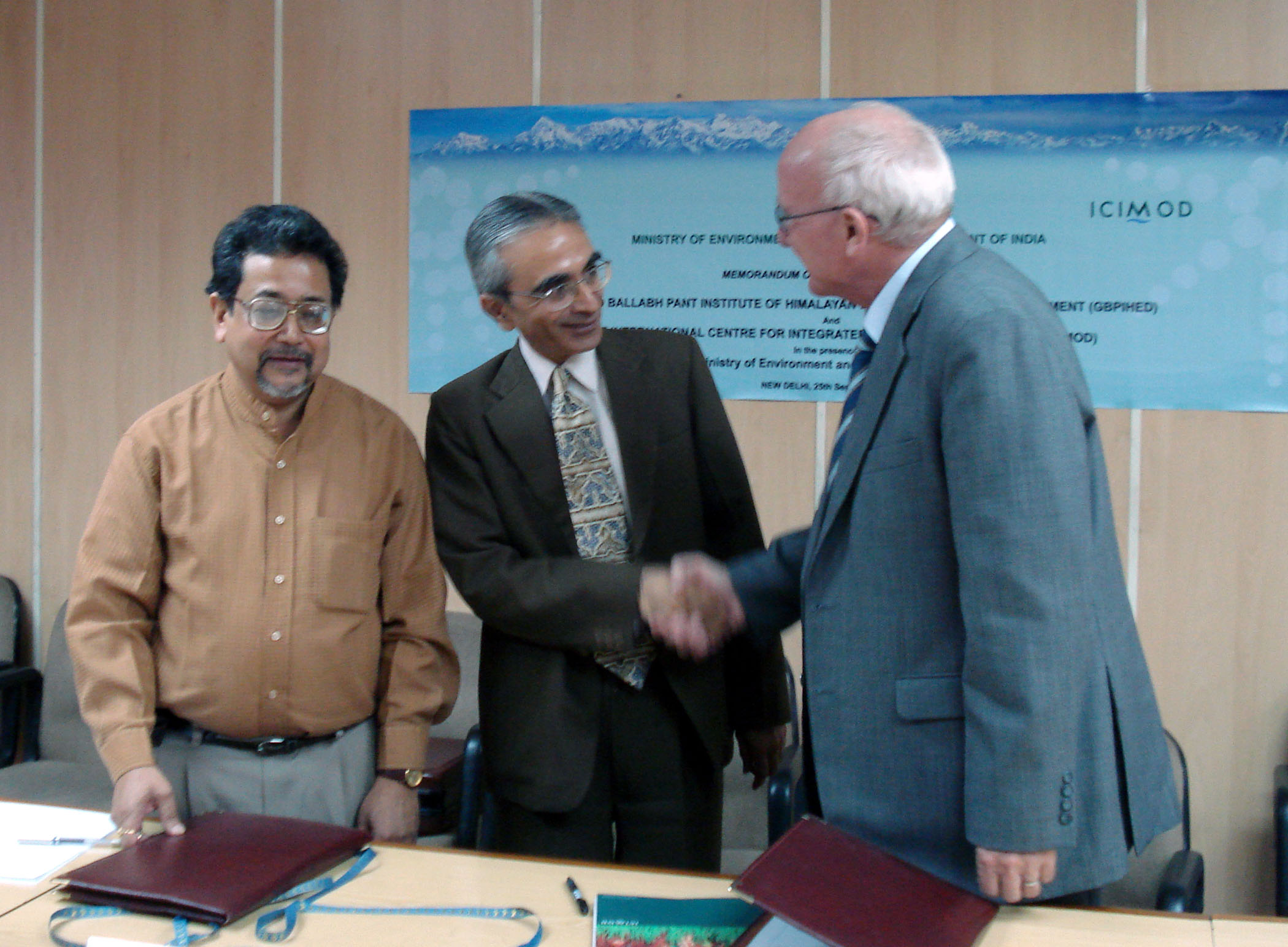
L.M.S. Palni (Director, GBPIHED), Vijai Sharma (Secretary, MoEF&CC, Govt. of India), and Andreas Schild (Director General, ICIMOD) at New Delhi in September 2008.

The institute receives its core funding from the Ministry of Environment, Forests & Climate Change, of the Government of India. The research and development activities are, however, substantially strengthened through external funding obtained from different national agencies (such as DBT, CSIR, DST, UGC, ICSSR, INSA, ICAR, UCOST, NEC, Sikkim Govt., WWF-India, etc.) and international agencies (such as ICIMOD, UNESCO, NORAD, TSBF, CIDA-SICI, McArthur Foundation, BCN, TMI, UNDP, FAO, UNIDO, UNICEF, etc.).

== See also ==
- Official website
