= Katarmal =

- Village
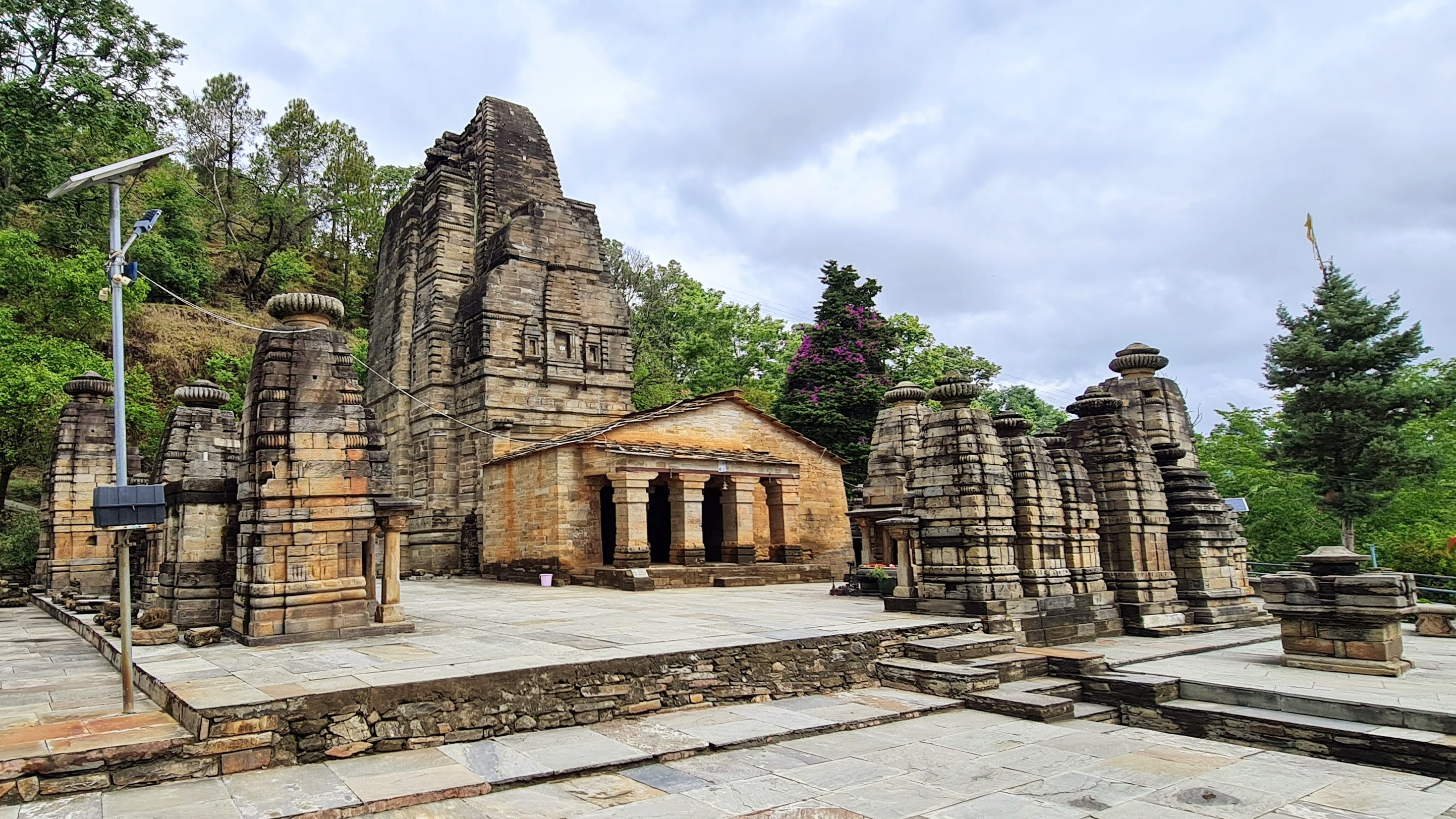
- Sun Temple, Katarmal

- Location in Uttarakhand, India Katarmal (India)
- Coordinates: 29.632473°N 79.614682°E
- Country: India
- State: Uttarakhand
- Elevation: 2,116 m (6,942 ft)

Languages
  - Official: Hindi
- Time zone: UTC+5:30 (IST)
- Vehicle registration: UK-01
- Climate: Alpine (BSh) and Humid subtropical(Bsh) (Köppen)
- Website: uk.gov.in

Katarmal is a remote village located in Kumaon Division, in Almora District, Uttarakhand, India.

== Location ==
Katarmal is 1.5 kilometres (0.93 mi) from Kosi village, 12 kilometres (7.5 mi) from the district centre, Almora and 70 kilometres (43 mi) from Nainital. Located at a height of 2,116 metres (6,942 ft) above sea level, it is well connected by road, 30 kilometres (19 mi) from Khairna, Garampani Nainital, Haldwani and 33 kilometres (21 mi)from Ranikhet and Kausani, the nearest connecting point being near Kosi village. The G.B. Pant Institute of Himalayan Environment and Development, established in 1988, serves as a nodal agency for research and development and was established here by the government of India.

== Surya temple ==
Katarmal is known for a relatively rare Surya temple, constructed by the Katyuri Kings in the 9th century CE and bears witness to the architecture of the day. Masons of the time used a mixture of lime and lentil paste to make the adhesive agent. Katarmalla, a Katyuri king, constructed the temple, which has 44 smaller temples around the main deity of Surya, called Burhadita or Vraddhaditya. Other deities like Shiva-Parvathi and Lakshmi-Narayana are also established in the temple complex. The carved wooden doors and panels were transported to the National Museum, Delhi, after a murti from the 10th century was stolen. The temple, which holds other carvings on the walls and panels, was declared a monument of national importance under the Ancient Monuments and Archaeological Sites and Remains Act of 1958.
