= Temple of the Moon =

Temple of the Moon may refer to:

- Temple of the Moon (Yemen), moon God of the pre-Islamic Yemeni kingdom of Saba, with temples near Ma'rib
- Temple of the Moon (China), a Ming dynasty altar in Beijing built in the 16th century AD
- Temple of the Moon (Peru), an Incan ruin on Huayna Picchu near Machu Picchu built in the 15th century AD
- Temple of the Moon (Utah), a summit in Capitol Reef National Park, US
- "Temple of the Moon", a song by the Austrian band Dargaard from the 1998 album Eternity Rites

== See also ==
- Moon Temple (Chía), constructed by the Muisca in Chía, Cundinamarca, Colombia
- Pyramid of the Moon, San Juan Teotihuacán, Mexico, constructed 100–450 AD
