= Temple of the Cross Complex =

Complex of Mayan temples at Palenque in Mexico

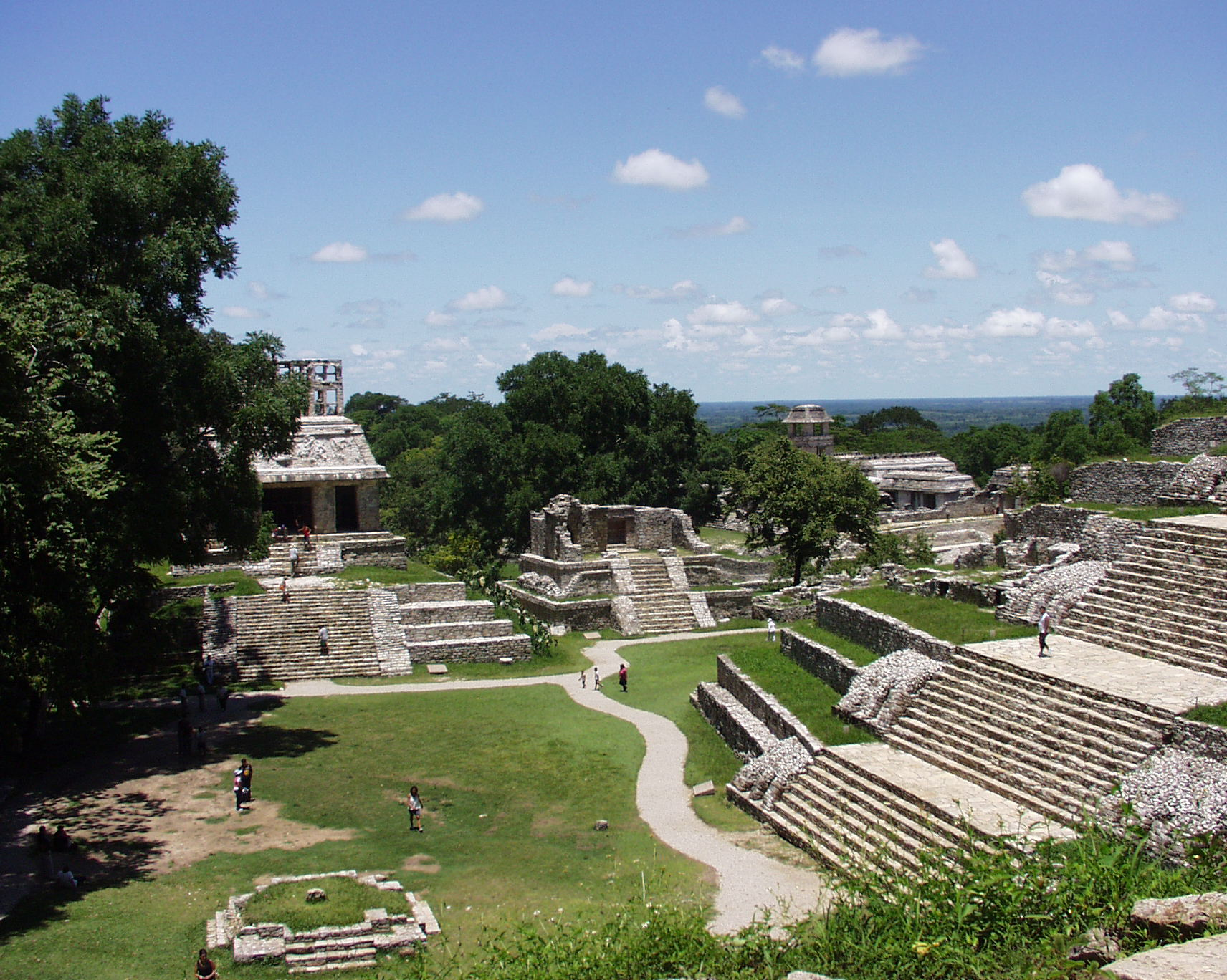
The Temple of the Cross Complex

The Temple of the Cross Complex is a complex of temples at the Maya site of Palenque in the state of Chiapas in Mexico. It is located in the south-east corner of the site and consists of three main structures: the Temple of the Cross, Temple of the Sun, and the Temple of the Foliated Cross. The Temple of the Cross is the largest and most significant. The temple is a step pyramid containing bas-relief carvings inside. The temple was constructed to commemorate the rise of Chan Bahlum II to the throne after the death of Pacal the Great. The bas-relief carvings reveal Chan Bahlum receiving the great gift from his predecessor. The cross motif found at the complex allude to the names given to the temples, but in reality the cross is a representation to the World Tree that can be found in the center of the world according to Maya mythology.

== History ==
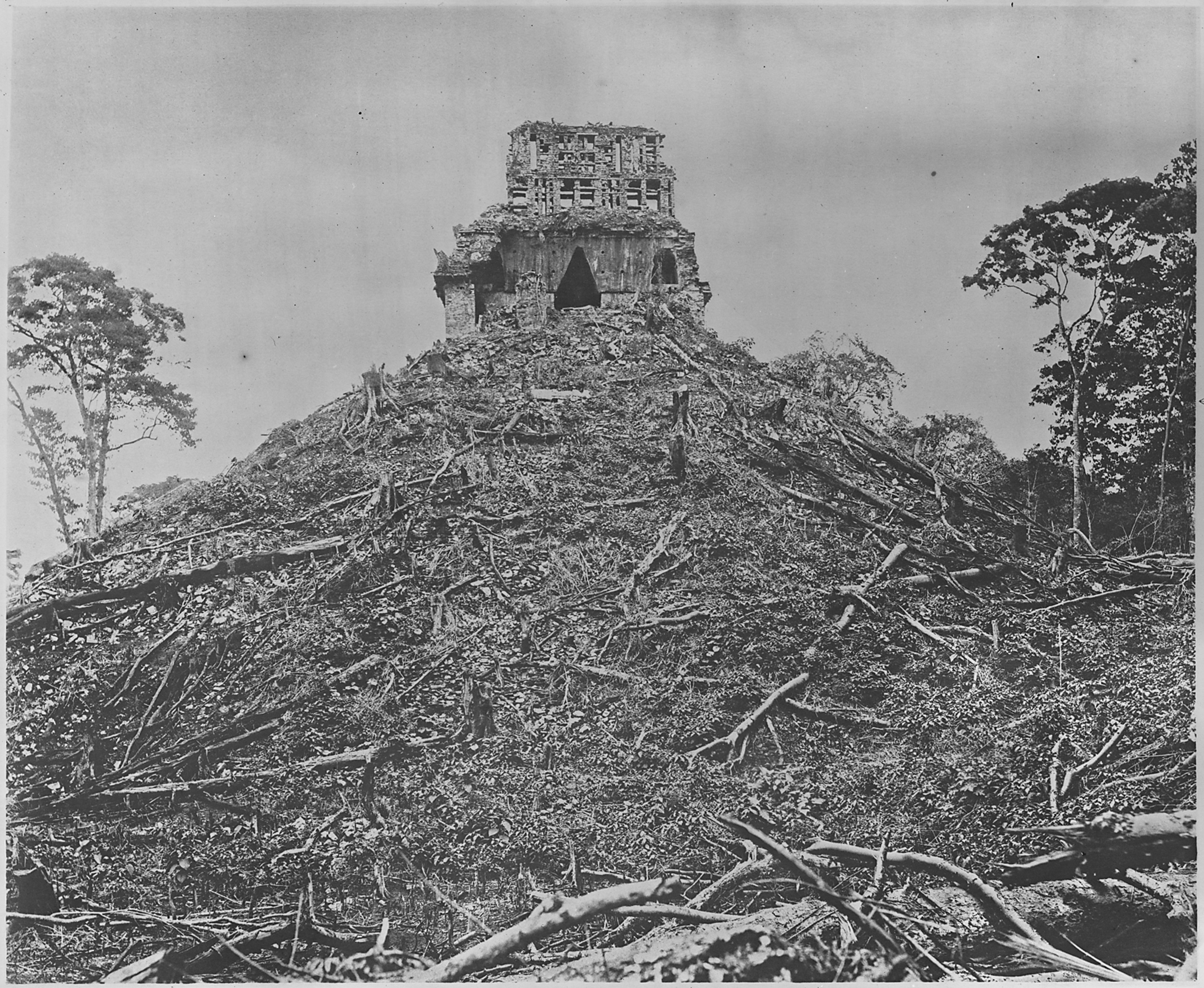
Temple of the Cross during the primary stages of excavation.

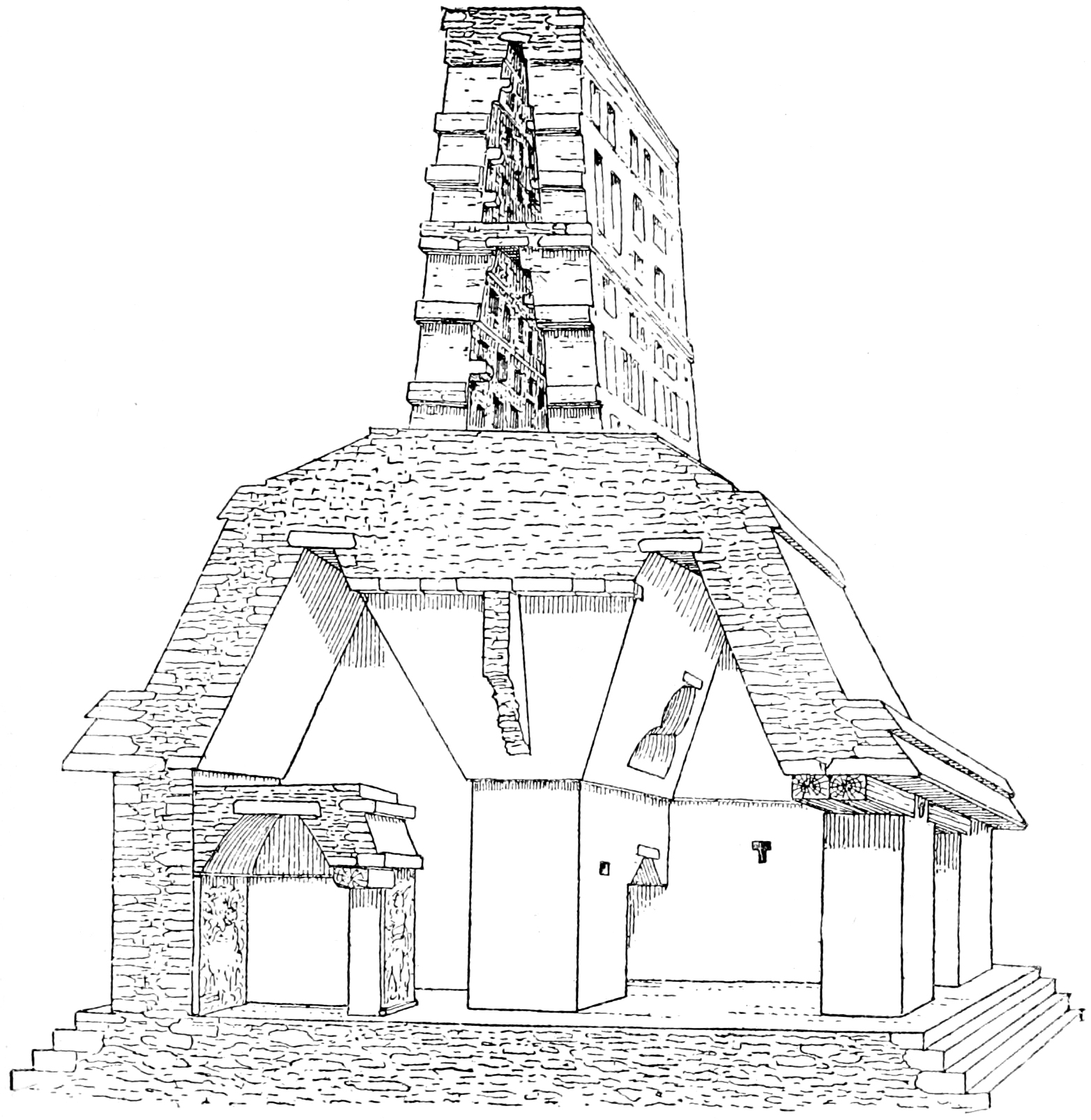
Temple of the Cross

The Temple of the Cross complex was built by Kan-Bahlum who reigned between 684 AD and 702 AD. One purpose of the temple was to house the panels that recorded Kan-Bahlum's ancestral history, his accession and the divine origin of his lineage. In the sanctuaries in the temples there are carved stone tablets to be found, one tablet for each tower containing hieroglyphic information about the purpose of each temple. They also contain information about the Palenque triad of gods (GI, GII, and GIII) and their right to leadership.

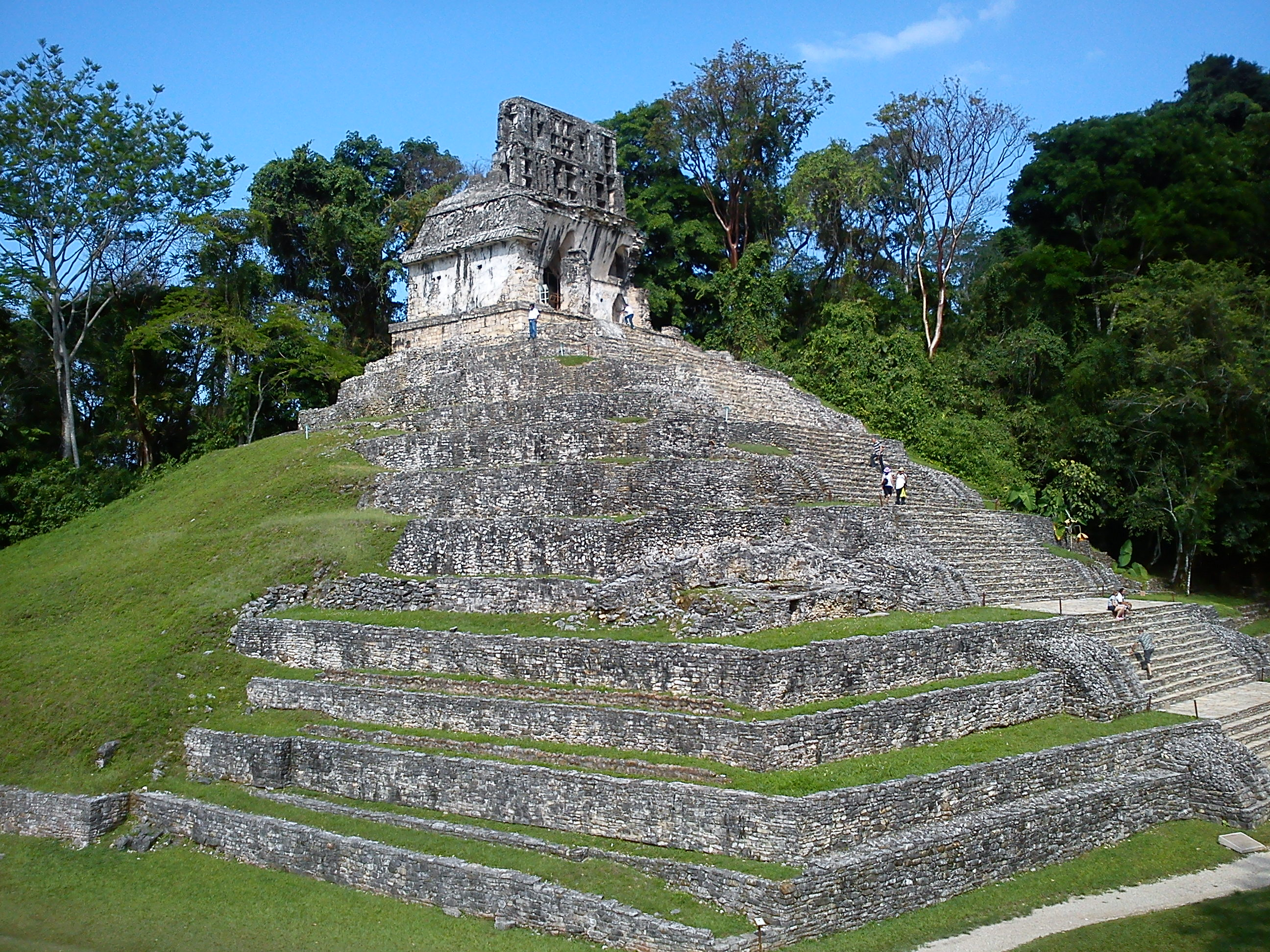
Temple of the Cross

The pyramids in the Cross Complex were built in the Late Classic period of the Mesoamerican chronology, constructed according to the general Mesoamerican architectural traditions. They relied on intricate carved stone to make the spectacular stairstep design. These three temples are the only structures in the Maya realm that play the role of a Maya codex (bark paper book) in three parts. Within the temples there is both real and mythical history recorded. The recorded history is cohesive; as you move from temple to temple, you can read the history as if it were a book.

Archaeologist have evidence that the site was attacked by Calakmul in 599 and 611. The attacks may have inspired the building tradition initiated by Pacal and continued by his son, K'inich Kan Bahlam, and grandson, Akul Mo' Naab. After the site was attacked by Toniná the construction of elaborate and complex buildings stopped around 800, and the population of the site decreased.

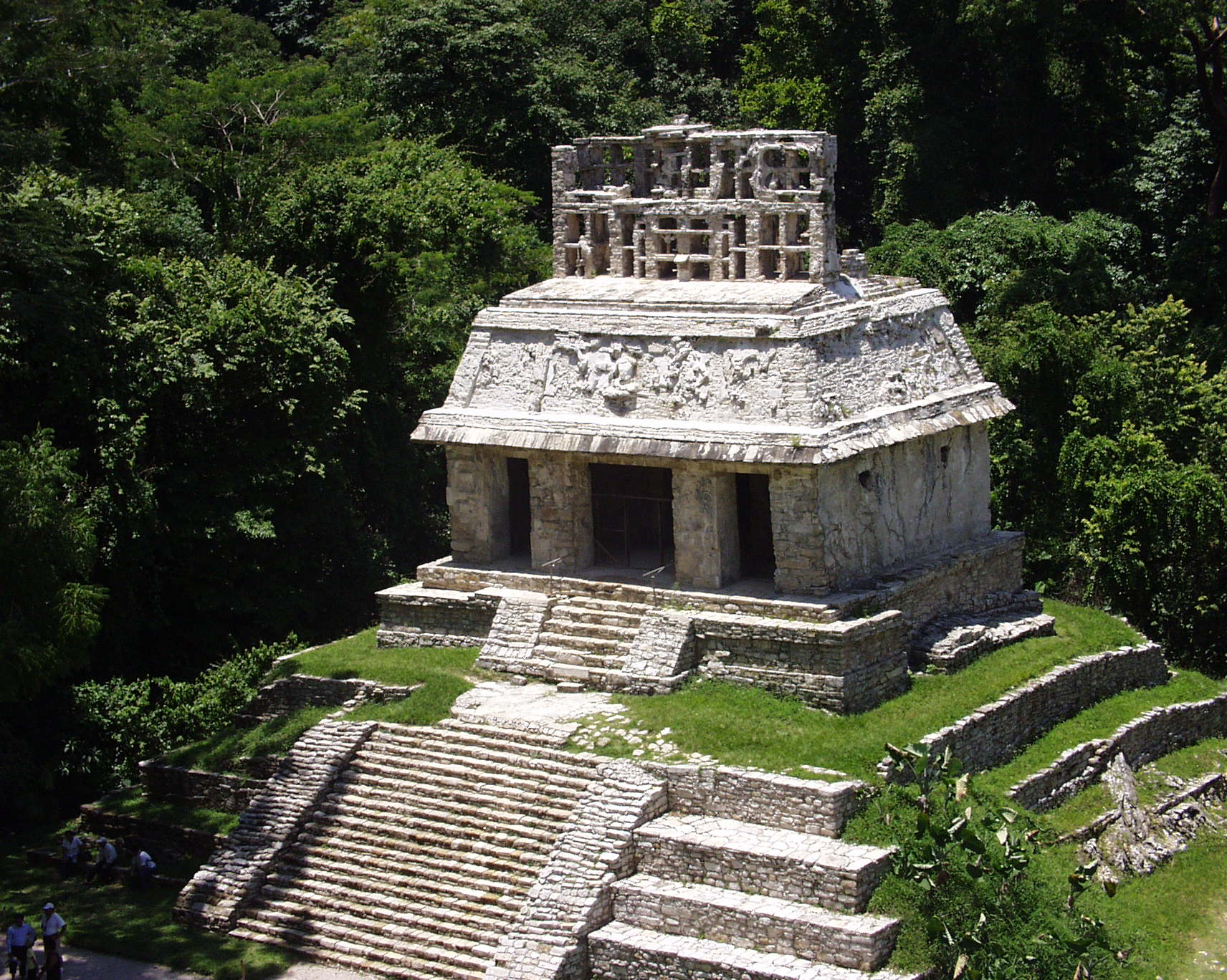
Temple of the Sun

When the Spanish arrived in the 16th century, Palenque had been abandoned and forgotten by the Maya in the region. In 1567 Father Pedro Lorenzo de la Nada was the first European to study and publish a description of the ruins which he named Palenque. Father Pedro Lorenze de la Nada was exploring near the Usumacinta River where he stumbled upon its stone temples and plazas.

Excavation, maintenance, and restoration of the Cross Complex was not initiated until 1940. More funding for maintenance came after Mexican archaeologist Alberto Ruz Lhuillier in 1952 discovered the burial tomb of Pacal the Great in the Temple of Inscriptions. Since the discovery of Pacal's tomb, the site has become one of the most extensively studied archaeological sites in the Americas. Archeologist Jorge Acosta expanded excavation and conservation of the Cross Complex from 1967 to 1974. The Palenque Project led by archeologist Arnoldo González Cruz in 1989 initiated extensive research, restoration, and conservation projects on the Cross Complex. In 1993 archaeologists found an offering containing more than 100 incense burners within the Temple of the Cross.

== Structure ==
Temple of the Cross Layout:C-Cross, F-Foliated Cross, S-Sun

The Cross Complex site is located at the bottom of the mountain Yehmal K'uk' Lakam Witz, The Great Mountain of the Descending Quetzal. Yehmal K'uk' Lakam Witz was considered a sacred mountain by the Maya because of the many natural springs that supply fresh water to Otulum River. The Otulum River was the principal water source for the city.

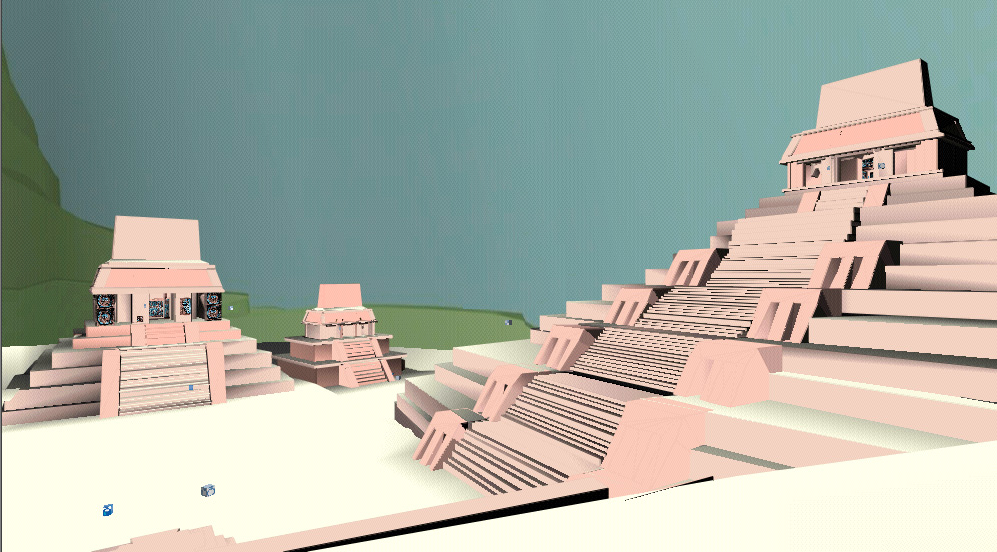
Temple of the Sun (left), Temple XIV (center), and Temple of the Cross (right)

The Cross Complex structures are built from limestone which is widely available throughout the region. According to accounts from the 16th century, the stone temples were covered in stucco and decorated with blue and red paint. The three main temples that comprise the Cross Complex are aligned to form a cross.

The Temple of the Foliated Cross is directly across the courtyard from the Temple of the Sun, and both are adjacent to the Temple of the Cross. Temple XIV and Temple XV are two smaller temples are found between the Temple of the Sun and the Temple of the Cross. The picture to the left is a reconstruction as seen from the Temple of the Foliated Cross, although Temple XV is missing from the illustration.

== Bas-reliefs ==
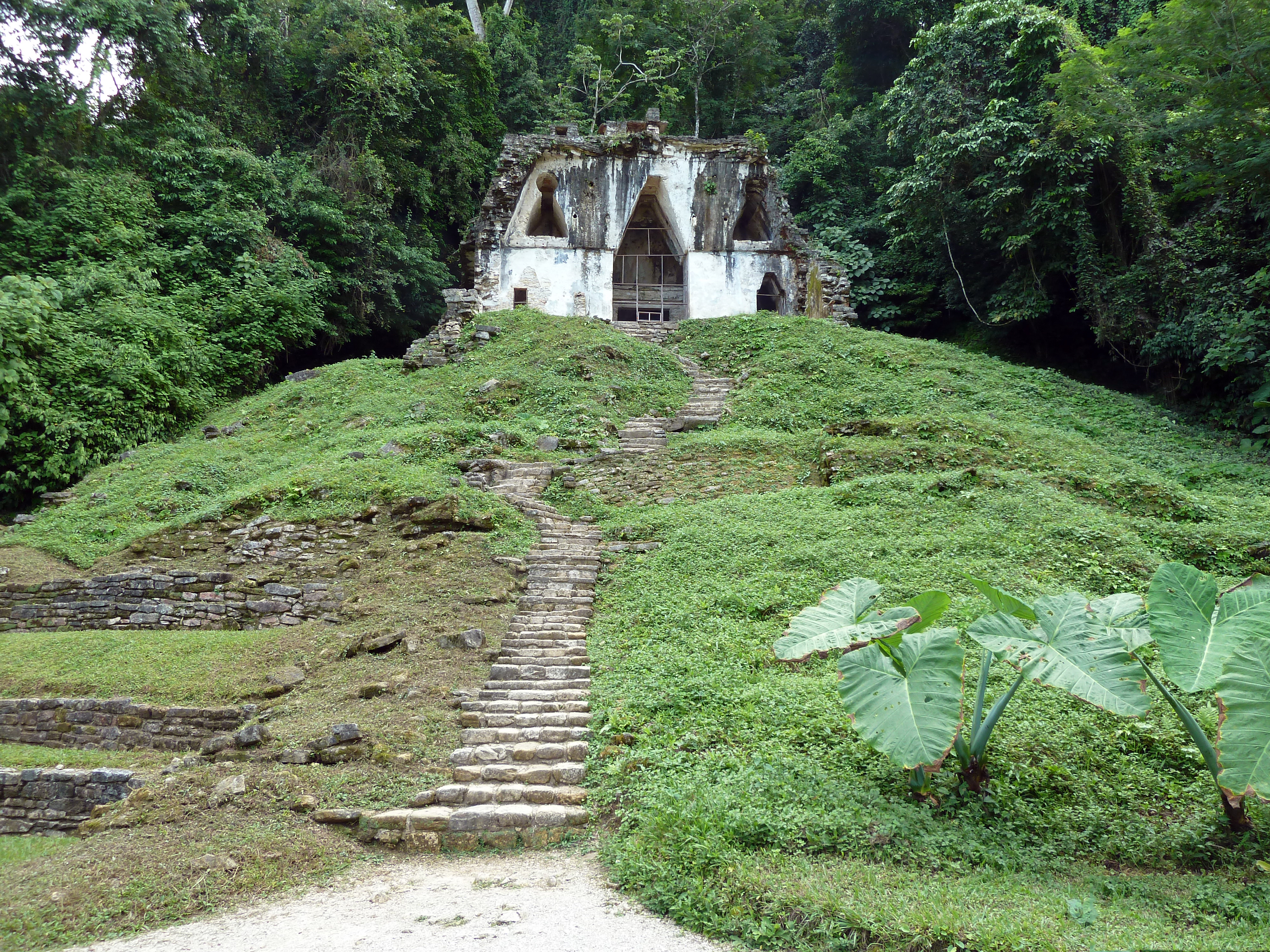
Temple of the Foliated Cross

Temple of the Cross.

Bas-relief carvings in the Temple of the Cross describe the accession of K'inich Kan Balam to the throne of Palenque. Within the inner chamber of these temples bas-relief carvings are found, depicting two figures. At first scientists thought that the smaller figure was K'inich Janaab' Pakal, Kan Bahlum's father, and that the bigger figure was K'inich Kan B'ahlam himself. Now, with a greater knowledge of iconography and epigraphy, it is believed that both figurines represent Kan Bahlum: one in his youth at the ritual of passage, and the other at adulthood representing his accession to the throne. Between these figures is the Ceiba, also known as the World Tree.

Representing paths to the Otherworld, each one of the three temples is also dedicated to a certain god in the Palenque triad. These paths to the Otherworld were crucial for the reigning king, since he must take them in order to bring back gifts of life and prosperity to his people. In this group of temples, the most significant is the Temple of the Cross which is associated with the God GI, the first born in the triad, also known as Hunahpu. Human by aspect, he is fable than his brothers because he has a shell earflare, a square-eye and a fish fin on his cheek. He is known to wear the quadripartite Monster as a headdress and he is also associated with the so-called Waterbird. What should be remembered is that Kan-bahlum lived and reigned before any of the triad Gods and that he constructed and built these temples so that the triad gods could put their mark on them.
