= Sun Temple, Madkhera =

Coordinates: 24°52′13″N 78°47′07″E

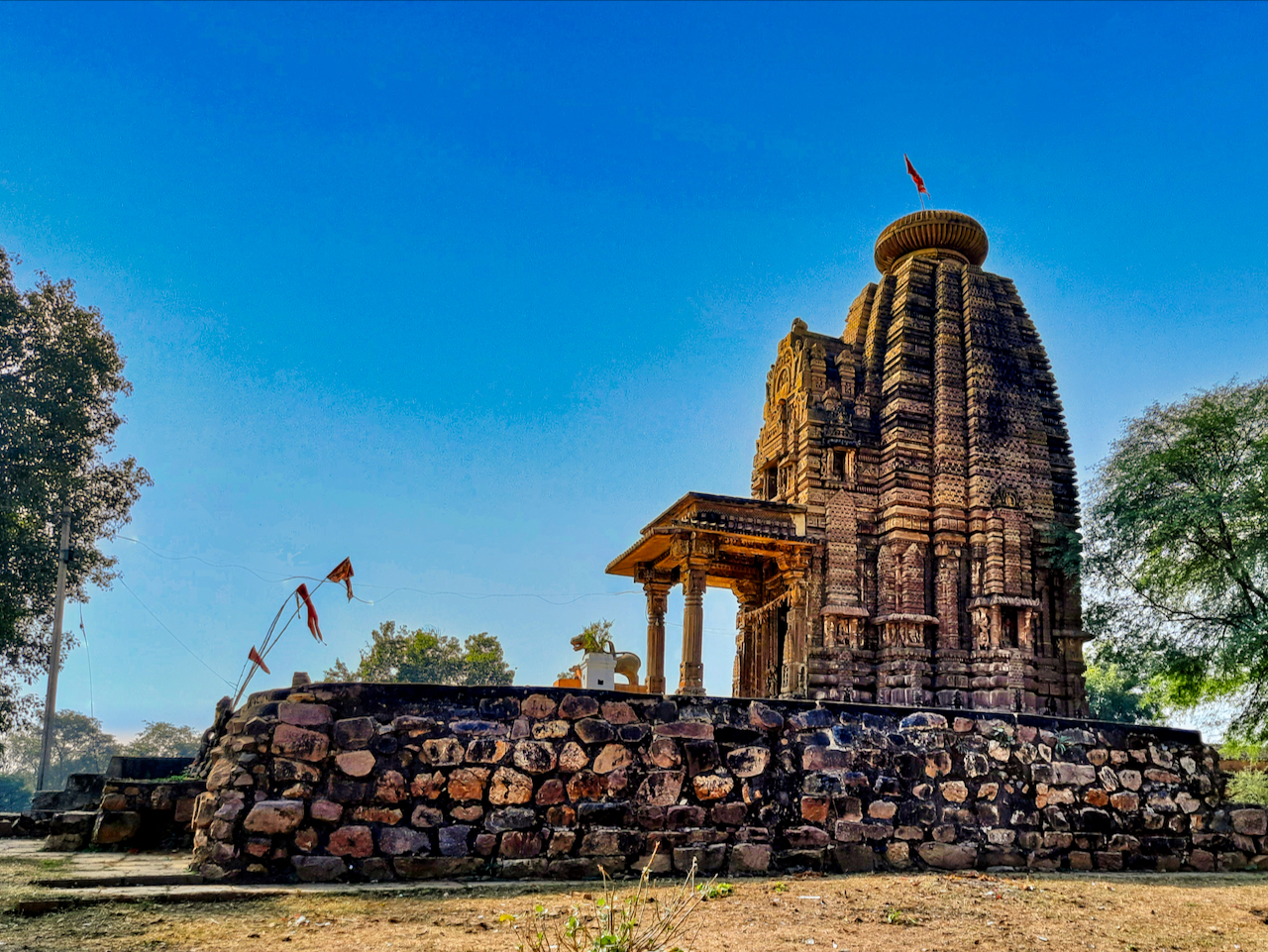

Religion
- Affiliation: Hinduism
- Deity: Surya

Location
- Location: Madkhera, Tikamgarh district, Madhya Pradesh

Sun Temple, Madkhera is a temple located in the village of Madkhera, in Tikamgarh district, in the Indian state of Madhya Pradesh. It is listed as a state protected monument.

== History ==
The temple was built during the reign of the Pratihara dynasty.

== Description ==
It is located at the village of Madkhera, also spelt Markhera. The name of the village translates to "village of the temple", which suggests that it might have been named after this temple.

The east-facing temple is built on a plinth. It consists of a porch, ante-chamber, and sanctum. Dashavatara incarnations of Vishnu are displayed on various niches. The doorjamb of the ante-chamber contains sculptures of Ganga and Yamuna. The sanctum contains the idol of Surya standing over a lotus pedestal.
