= Biranchinarayan Temple, Palia =

Surya temple in Odisha, India

Coordinates: 21°1′39″N 86°36′40″E

Sri Biranchinarayan Temple is in Palia village, which is located 15 kilometres (9.3 mi) south of Bhadrak District, Odisha, India on the way from Bhadrak to Chandabali. It occupies a significant place in the cultural map of Odisha state of India. Today, the standing Biranchi Narayan Temple stands as evidence of the heritage of Surya Upasana in Odisha. Biranchi Narayan is another name for Lord Surya, the Sun God of light and lustre. The existing temple is dedicated to Biranchi-narayan, who is enshrined as a roughly four-faced image of the Sun. A square stone slightly tapering towards the top contains four carved images of the Sun god in relief, on the four sides of a slab. The figures hold two lotuses in two hands, as usual, and are depicted standing on chariots drawn by seven horses. Architecturally, the temple can be dated to the 13th century. It was renovated and reconstructed in the beginning of the 20th century by the generosity of a local zamindar.

== Architecture ==
In general the structure exhibits the Kalingan style of temple architecture. The peculiarities of the temple include the two doorjambs of the eastern door, which probably originally belonged to a Saiva temple and were reused in the present temple during a renovation. The sculptures and carvings of the two doorjambs bear a close resemblance to the Shiva temples of Bhubaneswar and Khiching of the 10th or 11th century AD.

== Festivals ==
- Ratha Saptami or so called Maagha Saptami.
- Samba Dashami

== Transport ==
Bhadrak is the nearest railway station which is between Bhubaneswar and Howrah. Many taxis and bus facilities to Paalia are available.
