= Temple of the Sun (Palenque) =

Coordinates: 17°28′58″N 92°02′45″W

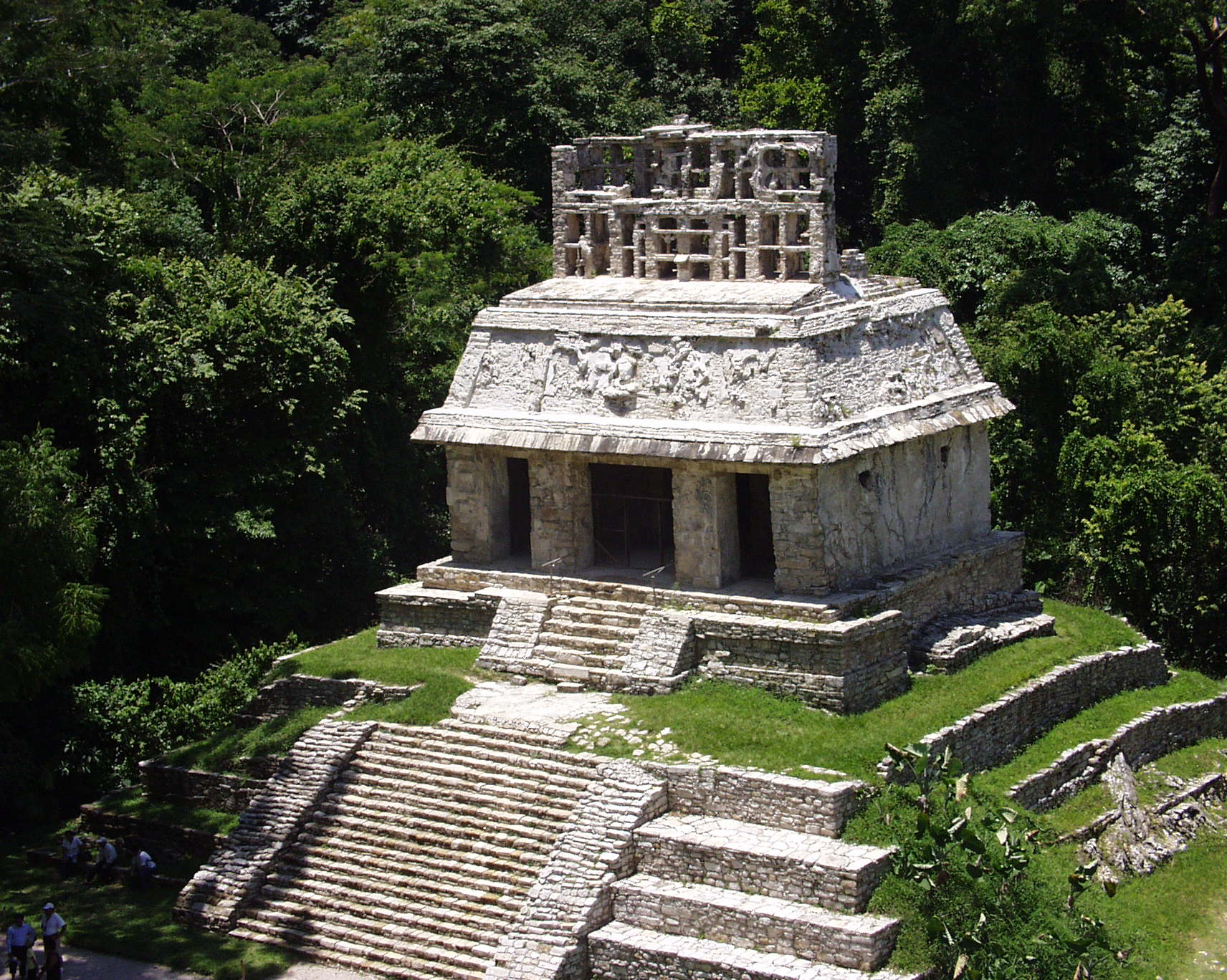
- Type: Maya temple
- Location: Palenque, Mexico
- Height: 19 metres (62 ft)
- Founder: Kʼinich Kan Bahlam II
- Built: Late 7th century
- Built for: K'inich Taj Wayib'
- Architectural style(s): Palenque

The Temple of the Sun is a ceremonial Maya temple dedicated to the Maya sun god K'inich Taj Wayib' or God GIII one of the three patron deities of the ancient city of Palenque located in Chiapas, Mexico.

The temple was built at late 7th century during the rule of K'inich Kan Bahlam II as part of the ceremonial plaza of the Temple of the Cross Complex where each of the three main temples are dedicated to one of the deities of the Palenque Triad who were considered the patron gods of the city. The Temple of the Sun was dedicated to the Maya sun god K'inich Taj Wayib' (Great Sun Torch) also identified as the god GIII incarnated as the fire jaguar that descends to the underworld.

== Architecture ==
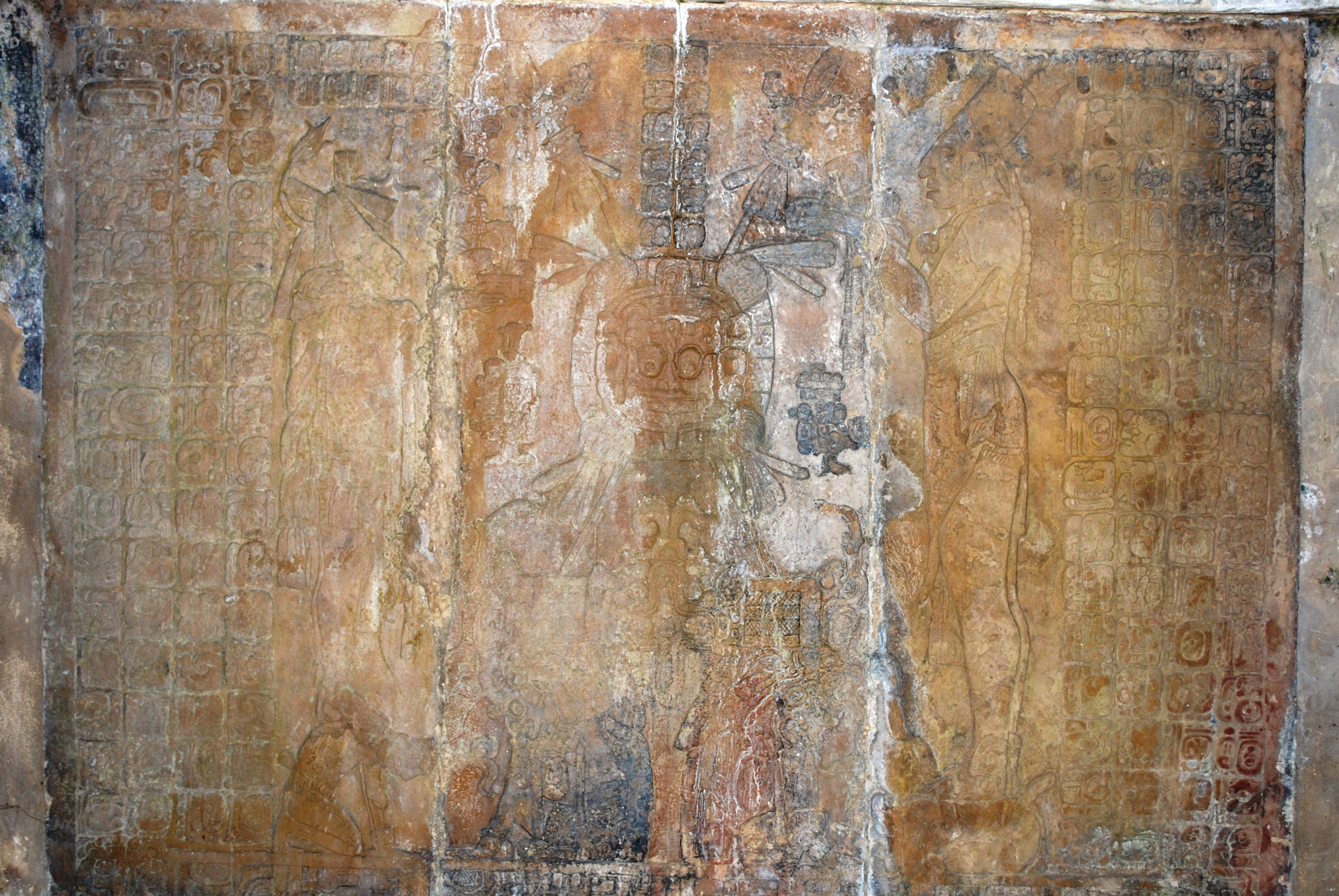
Tablet of the Sun inside the temple.

The Temple of the Sun is located in the Temple of the Cross Complex of Palenque along with the Temple of the Cross and the Temple of the Foliated Cross.It is considered the best preserved building in the complex. The Temple of the Sun is an example of the Palencan architectural style, the structure is a stepped pyramidal base with a three-entrance temple at the top. The temple's interior is made up of three rooms divided by walls with a main chamber with a large stone panel known as the Tablet of the Sun with iconography related to the sun god.

== Tablet of the Sun ==
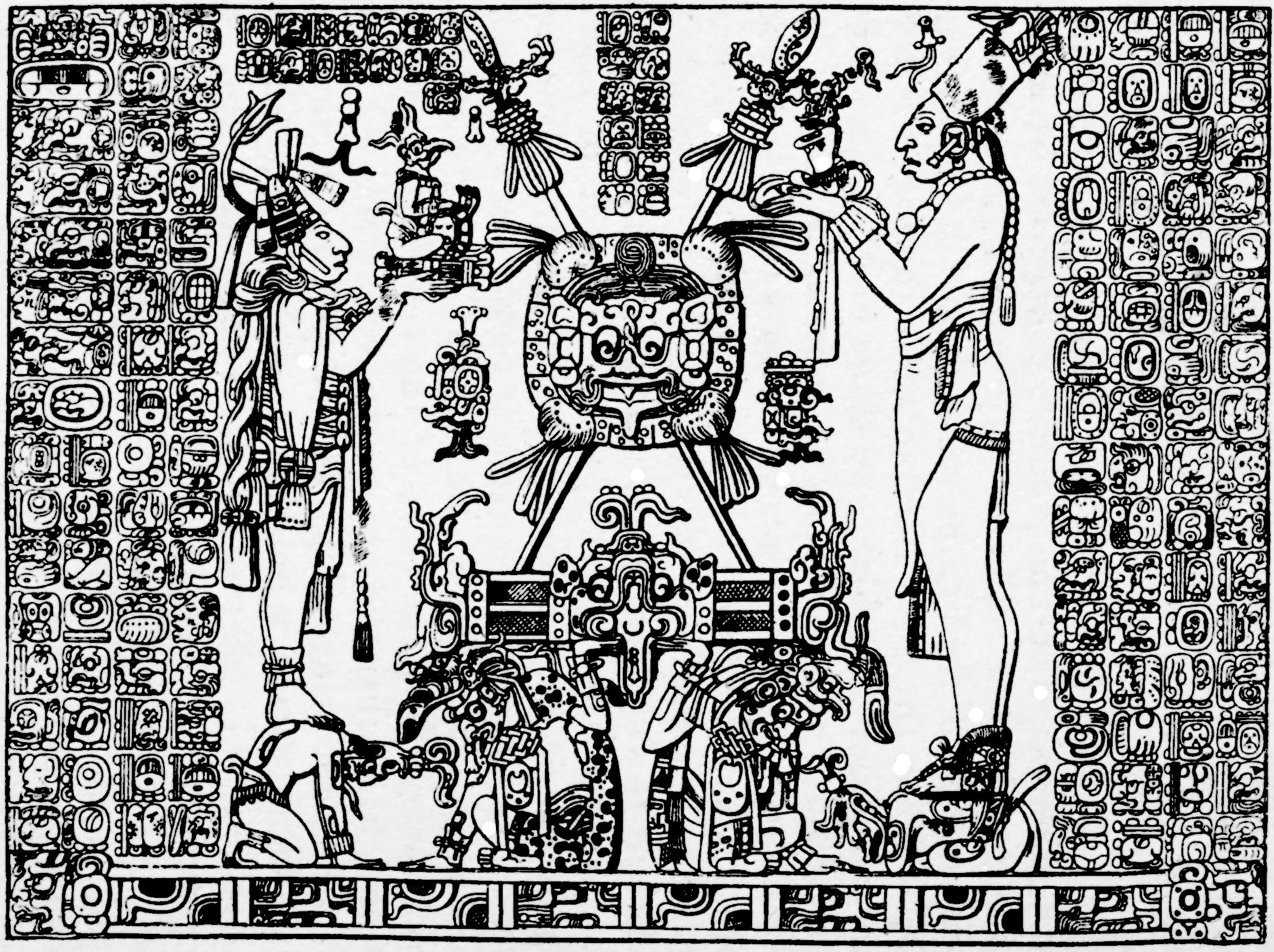
Relief of the Tablet of the Sun.

Inside the sanctuaries of the group of Crosses are found stone panels engraved with mythological scenes. The Tablet of the Sun represents the face of god GIII as a shield with two crossed lances over a jaguar throne carried by god L.
