= Navagraha Surya Mandir, Mangaldham =

Surya Mandir in Mithila

Navagraha Surya Mandir
- नवग्रह सूर्य मंदिर

Religion
- Affiliation: Hinduism
- District: Sitamarhi district
- Deity: Lord Suryanarayana
- Festival: Chhath Puja

Location
- Location: Mangaldham, Bajapatti
- State: Bihar
- Country: India

Architecture
- Designated as NHL: Surya Mandir

Navagraha Surya Mandir (Maithili: नवग्रह सूर्य मंदिर) is a Surya Mandir at the Hindu shrine Mangaldham in the Mithila region of the Indian subcontinent. It is located in the town of Bajapatti in the Sitamarhi district of the Bihar state in India. Here there is a statue of Lord Suryanarayana having the images of all the nine grahas (planets) of the Surya family, which are worshiped daily by the priests of the temple. The festival of Chhath Puja is a major festival celebrated in the campus of the temple.

== Description ==
During the festival of Chhath Puja, the temple is decorated richly. A grand Maha Arati of Lord Surya is performed here in the morning during the festival, in which a large number of devotees participate.

In the campus of the temple, apart from the statue of Navagraha Surya, there are statues of Maa Mangala Gauri, Kaal Bhairava, Sankat Mochan, Vishwakarma, Ram Janaki, Radha Krishna, Shankar-Parvati, Kartik, Ganesha, Riddhi-Siddhi, Nandi, Bharat Mata, Mahalakshmi, Mahasaraswati, Panchmukh Gayatri and Panch Shakti Peeth are also installed.
