= Beraunti =

Beraunti is a village in Bihar in Nalanda district of Bihar State, India. The village is administrated by Sarpanch an elected representative of the village.

== Demography ==
As of 2011, The village has a total number of 301 houses and the population of 1742 of which include 951 are males while 791 are females.
